= Helios =

Greek god and personification of the Sun

- God and personification of the Sun
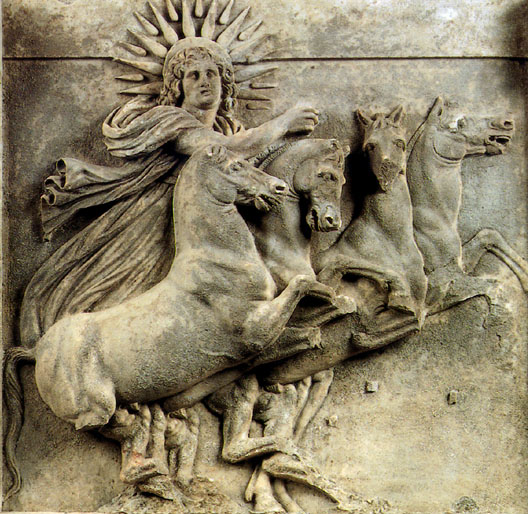
- Helios in his chariot, early 4th century BC, Athena's temple, Ilion
- Major cult center: Rhodes, Corinthia
- Planet: Sun
- Animals: Horse, rooster, wolf, cattle, serpent
- Symbol: Sun, chariot, horses, aureole, whip, heliotropium, frankincense, globe, cornucopia, ripened fruit
- Mount: A chariot driven by four white horses
- Festivals: Halia

Genealogy
- Parents: Hyperion and Theia
- Siblings: Selene and Eos

Equivalents
- Roman: Sol, Sol Invictus

In ancient Greek religion and mythology, Helios (/ˈhiːliəs, -ɒs/; Ancient Greek: Ἥλιος, pronounced [hɛ̌ːlios], lit. 'Sun'; Homeric Greek: Ἠέλιος) is the god who personifies the Sun. His name is also Latinized as Helius, and he is often given the epithets Hyperion ("the one above") and Phaethon ("the shining"). (Note: Hyperion and Phaethon are also the names of his father and son, respectively.) Helios is often depicted in art with a radiant crown and driving a horse-drawn chariot through the sky. He was a guardian of oaths and also the god of sight. Though Helios was a relatively minor deity in Classical Greece, his worship grew more prominent in late antiquity thanks to his identification with several major solar divinities of the Roman period, particularly Apollo and Sol. The Roman emperor Julian made Helios the central divinity of his short-lived revival of traditional Roman religious practices in the 4th century AD.

Helios figures prominently in several works of Greek mythology, poetry, and literature, in which he is often described as the son of the Titans Hyperion and Theia and brother of the goddesses Selene (the Moon) and Eos (the Dawn). Helios's most notable role in Greek mythology is the story of his mortal son Phaethon. In the Homeric epics, his most notable role is the one he plays in the Odyssey, where Odysseus's men despite his warnings impiously kill and eat Helios's sacred cattle that the god kept at Thrinacia, his sacred island. Once informed of their misdeed, Helios, in wrath, asks Zeus to punish those who wronged him, and Zeus, agreeing, strikes their ship with a thunderbolt, killing everyone except Odysseus himself, the only one who had not harmed the cattle and was allowed to live.

Due to his position as the Sun, he was believed to be an all-seeing witness and thus was often invoked in oaths. He also played a significant part in ancient magic and spells. In art he is usually depicted as a beardless youth in a chiton holding a whip and driving his quadriga, accompanied by various other celestial gods such as Selene, Eos, or the stars. In ancient times he was worshipped in several places of ancient Greece, though his major cult centres were the island of Rhodes, of which he was the patron god, Corinth, and the greater Corinthia region. The Colossus of Rhodes, a gigantic statue of the god, adorned the port of Rhodes until it was destroyed in an earthquake.

== Name ==
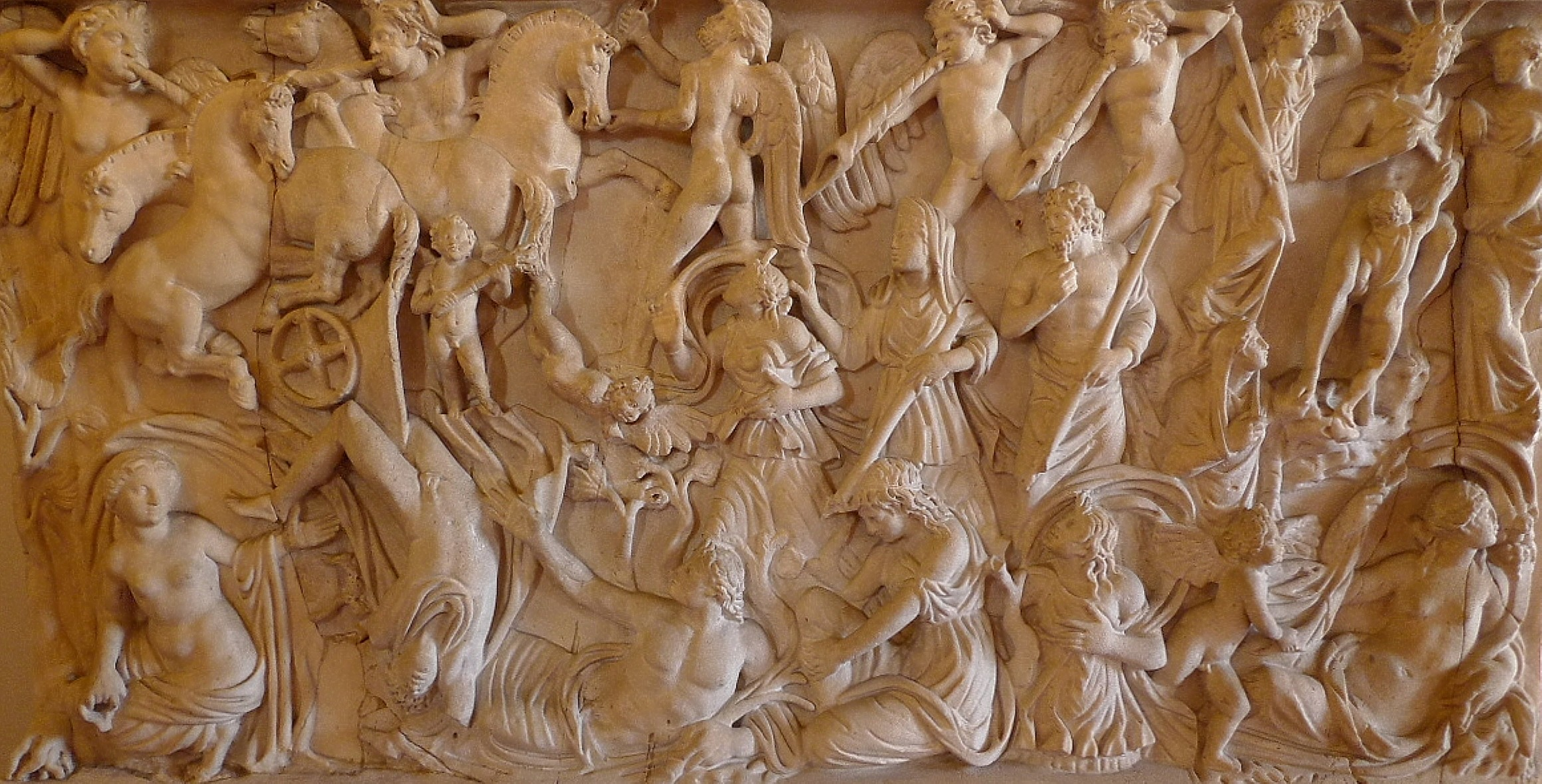
Helios (far right) in a Phaethon sarcophagus, detail, marble, third century AD, Verona, Italy.

The Greek noun ἥλιος (GEN ἡλίου, DAT ἡλίῳ, ACC ἥλιον, VOC ἥλιε) (from earlier ἁϝέλιος /hāwelios/) is the inherited word for the Sun from Proto-Indo-European *seh₂u-el which is cognate with Latin sol, Sanskrit surya, Old English swegl, Old Norse sól, Welsh haul, Avestan hvar, etc. The Doric and Aeolic form of the name is Ἅλιος, Hálios. In Homeric Greek his name is spelled Ἠέλιος, Ēélios, with the Doric spelling of that being Ἀέλιος, Aélios. In Cretan it was Ἀβέλιος (Abélios) or Ἀϝέλιος (Awélios). The Greek view of gender was also present in their language. Ancient Greek had three genders (masculine, feminine and neuter), so when an object or a concept was personified as a deity, it inherited the gender of the relevant noun; helios is a masculine noun, so the god embodying it is also by necessity male. The female offspring of Helios were called Heliades, the male Heliadae.

The author of the Suda lexicon tried to etymologically connect ἥλιος to the word ἀολλίζεσθαι, aollízesthai, "coming together" during the daytime, or perhaps from ἀλεαίνειν, aleaínein, "warming". Plato in his dialogue Cratylus suggested several etymologies for the word, proposing among others a connection, via the Doric form of the word halios, to the words ἁλίζειν, halízein, meaning collecting men when he rises, or from the phrase ἀεὶ εἱλεῖν, aeí heileín, "ever turning" because he always turns the earth in his course.

Doric Greek retained Proto-Greek long *ā as α, while Attic changed it in most cases, including in this word, to η. Cratylus and the etymologies Plato gives are contradicted by modern scholarship. From helios comes the modern prefix helio- used in many european languages, meaning "pertaining to the Sun", used in compounds word such as heliocentrism, aphelion, heliotropium, heliophobia (fear of the sun) and heliolatry ("sun-worship").

== Origins ==
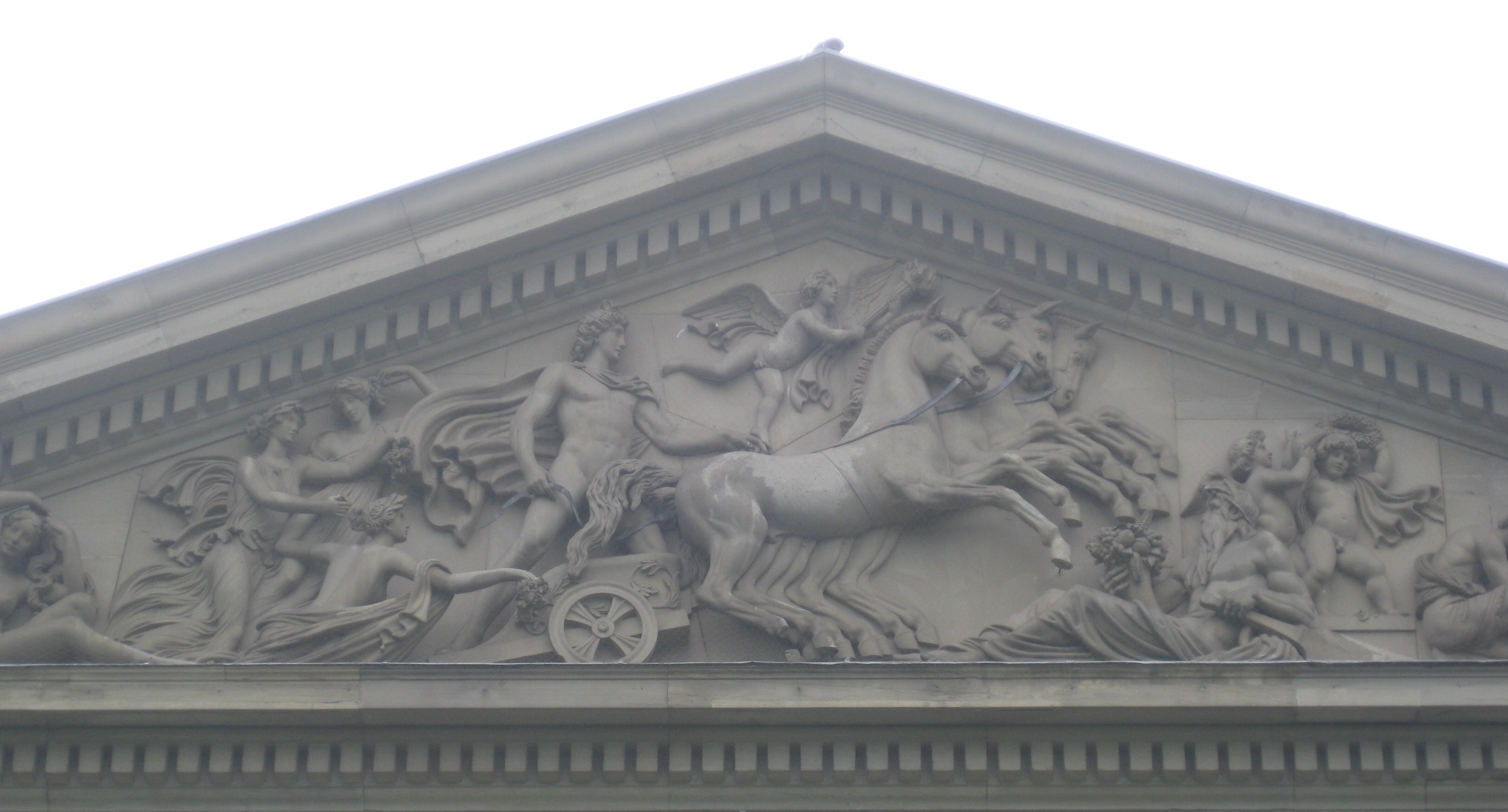
Helios relief (1830), Stuttgart, Rosenstein Castle.

Helios most likely is Proto-Indo-European in origin. Walter Burkert wrote that "... Helios, the sun god, and Eos-Aurora, the goddess of the dawn, are of impeccable Indo-European lineage both in etymology and in their status as gods" and might have played a role in Proto-Indo-European poetry. The imagery surrounding a chariot-driving solar deity is likely Indo-European in origin. Greek solar imagery begins with the gods Helios and Eos, who are brother and sister, and who become in the day-and-night-cycle the day (hemera) and the evening (hespera), as Eos accompanies Helios in his journey across the skies. At night, he pastures his steeds and travels east in a golden boat. In them evident is the Indo-European grouping of a sun god and his sister, as well as an association with horses.

Helen of Troy's name is thought to share the same etymology as Helios, and she may express an early alternate personification of the sun among Hellenic peoples. Helen might have originally been considered to be a daughter of the Sun, as she hatched from an egg and was given tree worship, features associated with the Proto-Indo-European Sun Maiden; in surviving Greek tradition however Helen is never said to be Helios's daughter, instead being the daughter of Zeus.

It has been suggested that the Phoenicians brought over the cult of their patron god Baal among others (such as Astarte) to Corinth, who was then continued to be worshipped under the native name/god Helios, similarly to how Astarte was worshipped as Aphrodite, and the Phoenician Melqart was adopted as the sea-god Melicertes/Palaemon, who also had a significant cult in the isthmus of Corinth.

Helios's journey on a chariot during the day and travel with a boat in the ocean at night possibly reflects the Egyptian sun god Ra sailing across the skies in a barque to be reborn at dawn each morning anew; additionally, both gods, being associated with the sun, were seen as the "Eye of Heaven".

== Description ==
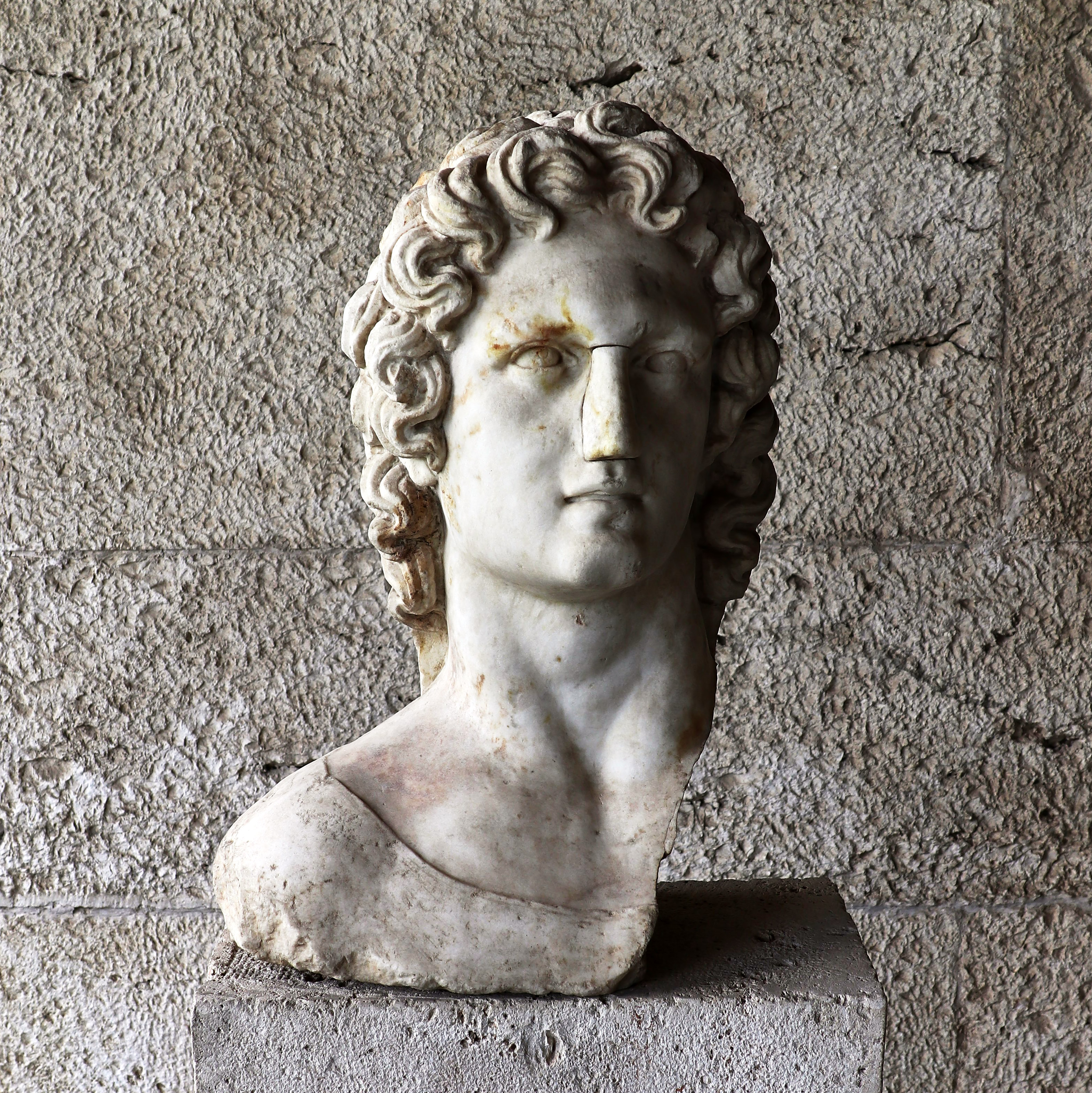
Bust of the sun-god Helios, second century AD; the holes were used for the attachment of a sun ray crown, Ancient Agora Museum, Athens, Greece.

Helios is the son of Hyperion and Theia, or Euryphaessa, or Basileia, and the only brother of the goddesses Eos and Selene. If the order of mention of the three siblings is meant to be taken as their birth order, then out of the four authors that give him and his sisters a birth order, two make him the oldest child, one the middle, and the other the youngest. (Note: Hesiod and Hyginus both give their birth order as first Helios/Sol, then Selene/Luna and lastly Eos/Aurora, pseudo-Apollodorus makes him the middle child (with Eos as the oldest) and the author of his Homeric Hymn has him as the youngest of the three (with Eos again as the oldest).) Helios was not among the regular and more prominent deities, rather he was a more shadowy member of the Olympian circle, despite the fact that he was among the most ancient. From his lineage, Helios might be described as a second generation Titan. He is associated with harmony and order, both literally in the sense of the movement of celestial bodies and metaphorically in the sense of bringing order to society.

Helios is usually depicted as a handsome young man crowned with the shining aureole of the Sun, which traditionally had twelve rays, symbolising the twelve months of the year. Beyond his Homeric Hymn, not many texts describe his physical appearance; Euripides describes him as χρυσωπός (khrysōpós) meaning "golden-eyed/faced" or "beaming like gold", Mesomedes of Crete writes that he has golden hair, and Apollonius Rhodius that he has light-emitting, golden eyes. According to Augustan poet Ovid, he dressed in tyrian purple robes and sat on a throne of bright emeralds. In ancient artefacts (such as coins, vases, or reliefs) he is presented as a beautiful, full-faced youth with wavy hair, wearing a crown adorned with the sun's rays.

Helios is said to drive a golden chariot drawn by four horses: Pyrois ("The Fiery One", not to be confused with Pyroeis, one of the five naked-eye planets known to ancient Greek and Roman astronomers), Aeos ("He of the Dawn"), Aethon ("Blazing"), and Phlegon ("Burning"). In a Mithraic invocation, Helios's appearance is given as thus:

A god is then summoned. He is described as "a youth, fair to behold, with fiery hair, clothed in a white tunic and a scarlet cloak and wearing a fiery crown." He is named as "Helios, lord of heaven and earth, god of gods."

As mentioned above, the imagery surrounding a chariot-driving solar deity is likely Indo-European in origin and is common to both early Greek and Near Eastern religions.

Helios is seen as both a personification of the Sun and the fundamental creative power behind it, and as a result is often worshiped as a god of life and creation. His literal "light" is often assorted with a metaphorical vitality, and other ancient texts give him the epithet "gracious" (ἱλαρός). The comic playwright Aristophanes describes Helios as "the horse-guider, who fills the plain of the earth with exceeding bright beams, a mighty deity among gods and mortals." One passage recorded in the Greek Magical Papyri says of Helios, "the earth flourished when you shone forth and made the plants fruitful when you laughed and brought to life the living creatures when you permitted." He is said to have helped create animals out of primeval mud.

== Mythology ==
=== God of the Sun ===
==== Rising and Setting ====
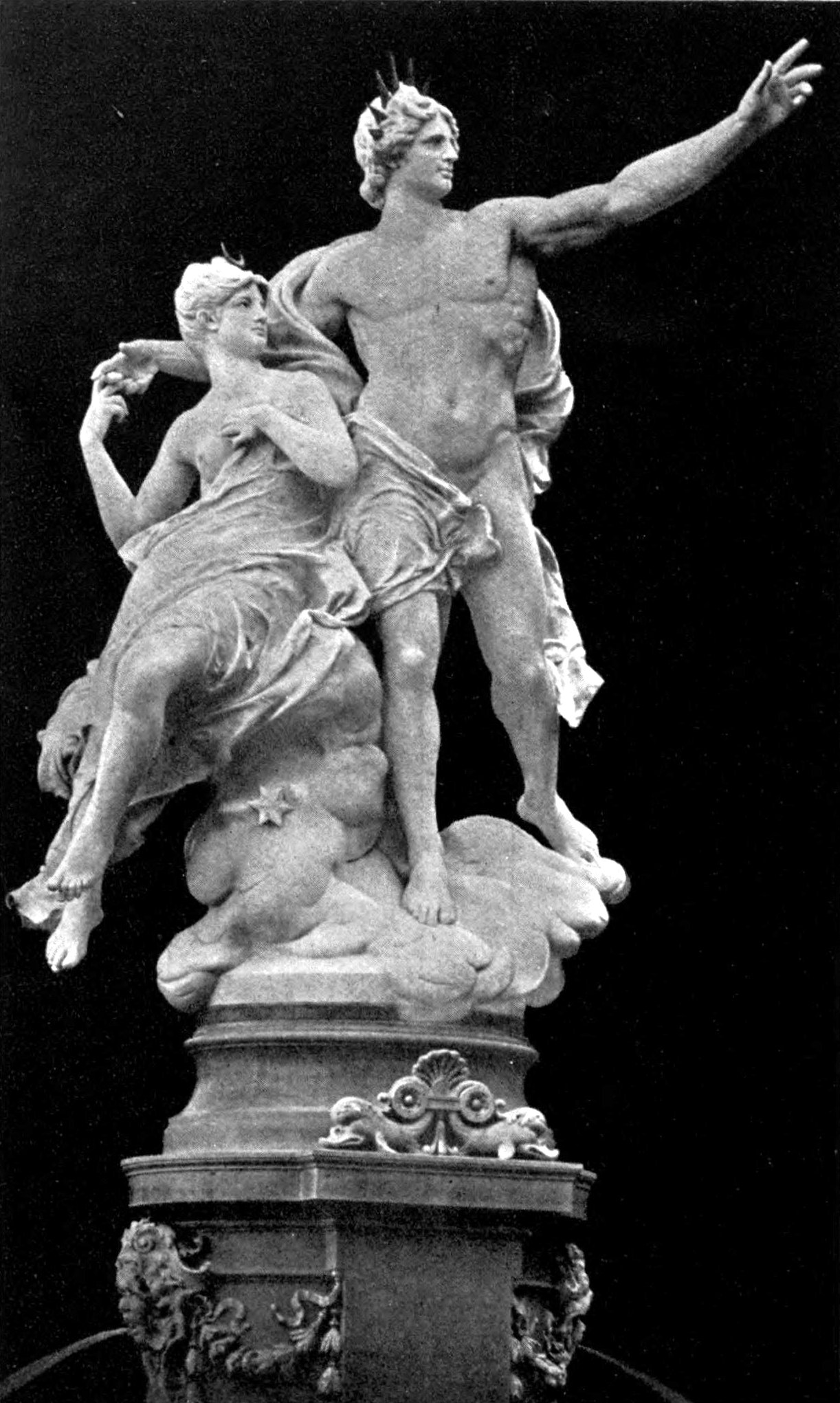
Helios and Selene, by Johann Rathausky, fountain group statue in Opatija, Croatia.

Helios was envisioned as a god driving his chariot from east to west each day, rising from the Oceanus River and setting in the west under the earth. It is unclear as to whether this journey means that he travels through Tartarus.

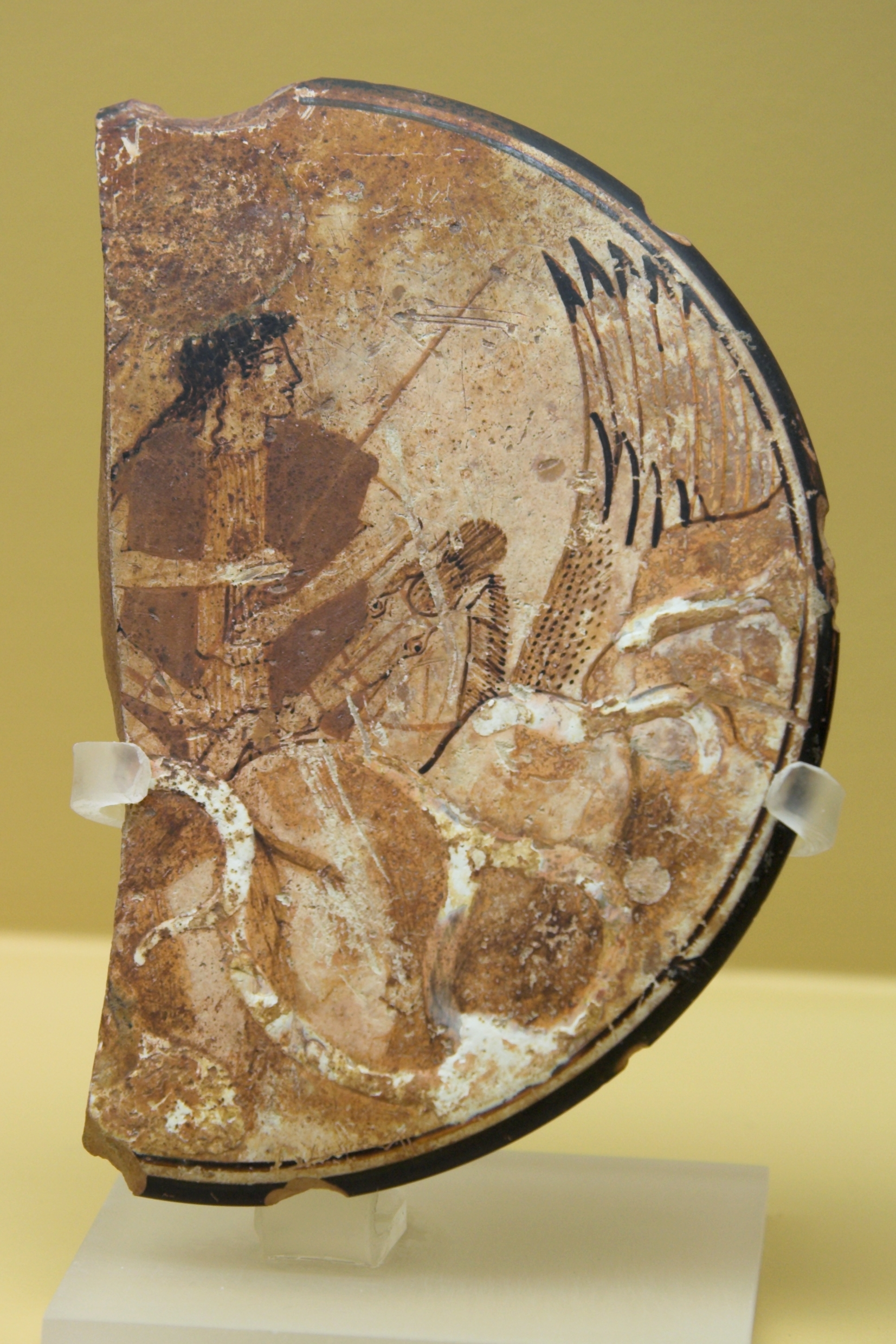
Helios the rising Sun, painting on a terracotta disk, 480 BC, Agora Museum Athens

Athenaeus in his Deipnosophistae relates that, at the hour of sunset, Helios climbs into a great cup of solid gold in which he passes from the Hesperides in the farthest west to the land of the Ethiops, with whom he passes the dark hours. According to Athenaeus, Mimnermus said that in the night Helios travels eastwards with the use of a bed (also created by Hephaestus) in which he sleeps, rather than a cup, as attested in the Titanomachy in the 8th century BCE. Aeschylus describes the sunset as such:

"There [is] the sacred wave, and the coralled bed of the Erythræan Sea, and [there] the luxuriant marsh of the Ethiopians, situated near the ocean, glitters like polished brass; where daily in the soft and tepid stream, the all-seeing Sun bathes his undying self, and refreshes his weary steeds."

— Aeschylus, Prometheus Unbound.

Athenaeus adds that "Helios gained a portion of toil for all his days", as there is no rest for either him or his horses.

Although the chariot is usually said to be the work of Hephaestus, Hyginus states that it was Helios himself who built it. His chariot is described as golden, or occasionally "rosy", and pulled by four white horses. The Horae, goddesses of the seasons, are part of his retinue and help him yoke his chariot. His sister Eos is said to have not only opened the gates for Helios, but would often accompany him as well. In the extreme east and west were said to be people who tended to his horses, for whom summer was perpetual and fruitful.

==== Disrupted schedule ====
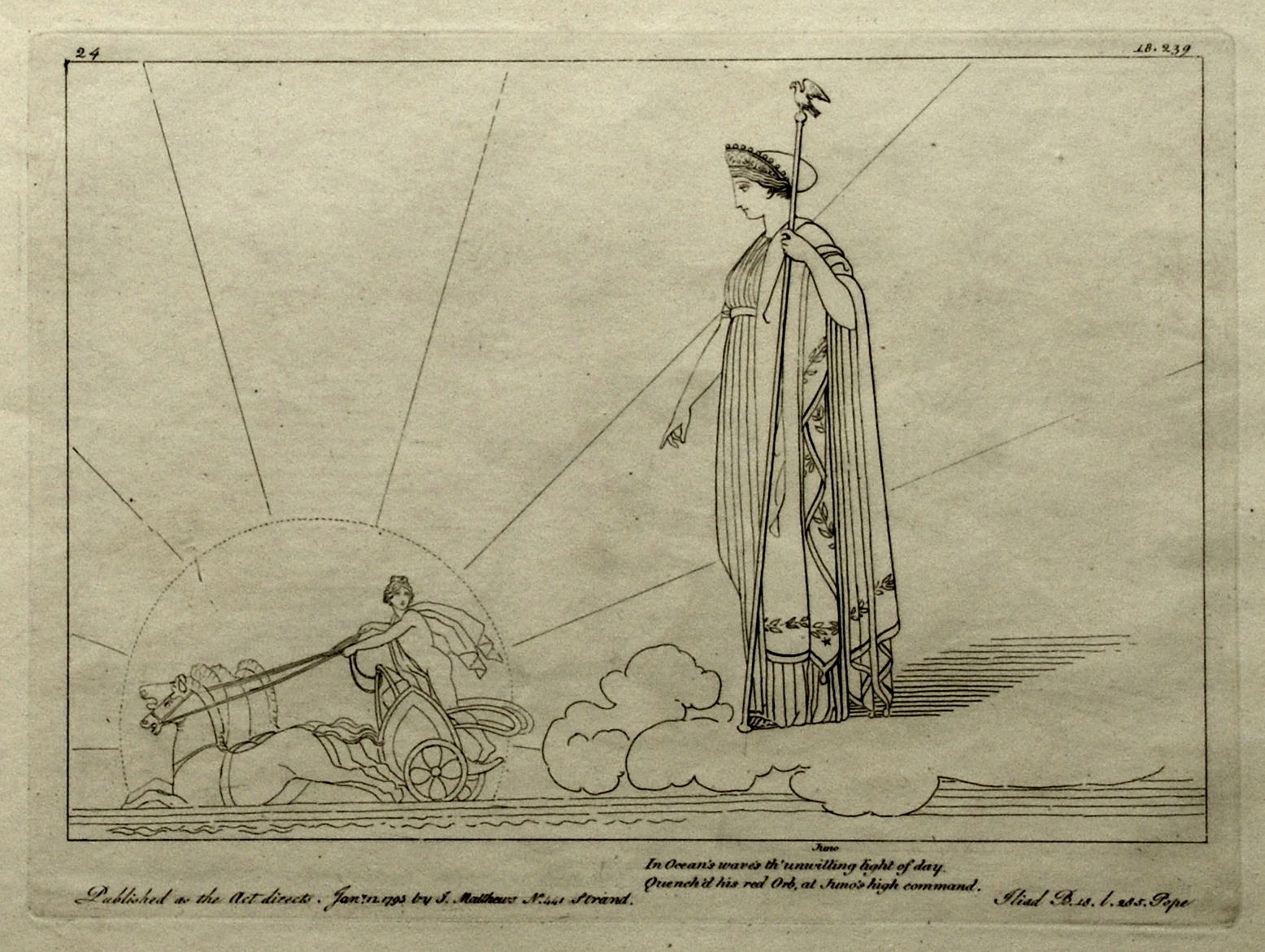
Hera makes Helios set earlier, Iliad engraving, John Flaxman.

On several instances in mythology the normal solar schedule is disrupted; he was ordered not to rise for three days during the conception of Heracles, and made the winter days longer in order to look upon Leucothoe. Athena's birth was a sight so impressive that Helios halted his steeds and stayed still in the sky for a long while, as heaven and earth both trembling at the newborn goddess' sight.

In the Iliad, Hera who supports the Greeks, makes him set earlier than usual against his will during battle, and later still during the same war, after his sister Eos's son Memnon was killed, she made him downcast, causing his light to fade, so she could be able to freely steal her son's body undetected by the armies, as he consoled his sister in her grief over Memnon's death.

It was said that summer days are longer due to Helios often stopping his chariot mid-air to watch from above nymphs dancing during the summer, and sometimes he is late to rise because he lingers with his consort. If the other gods wish so, Helios can be hastened on his daily course when they wish it to be night.

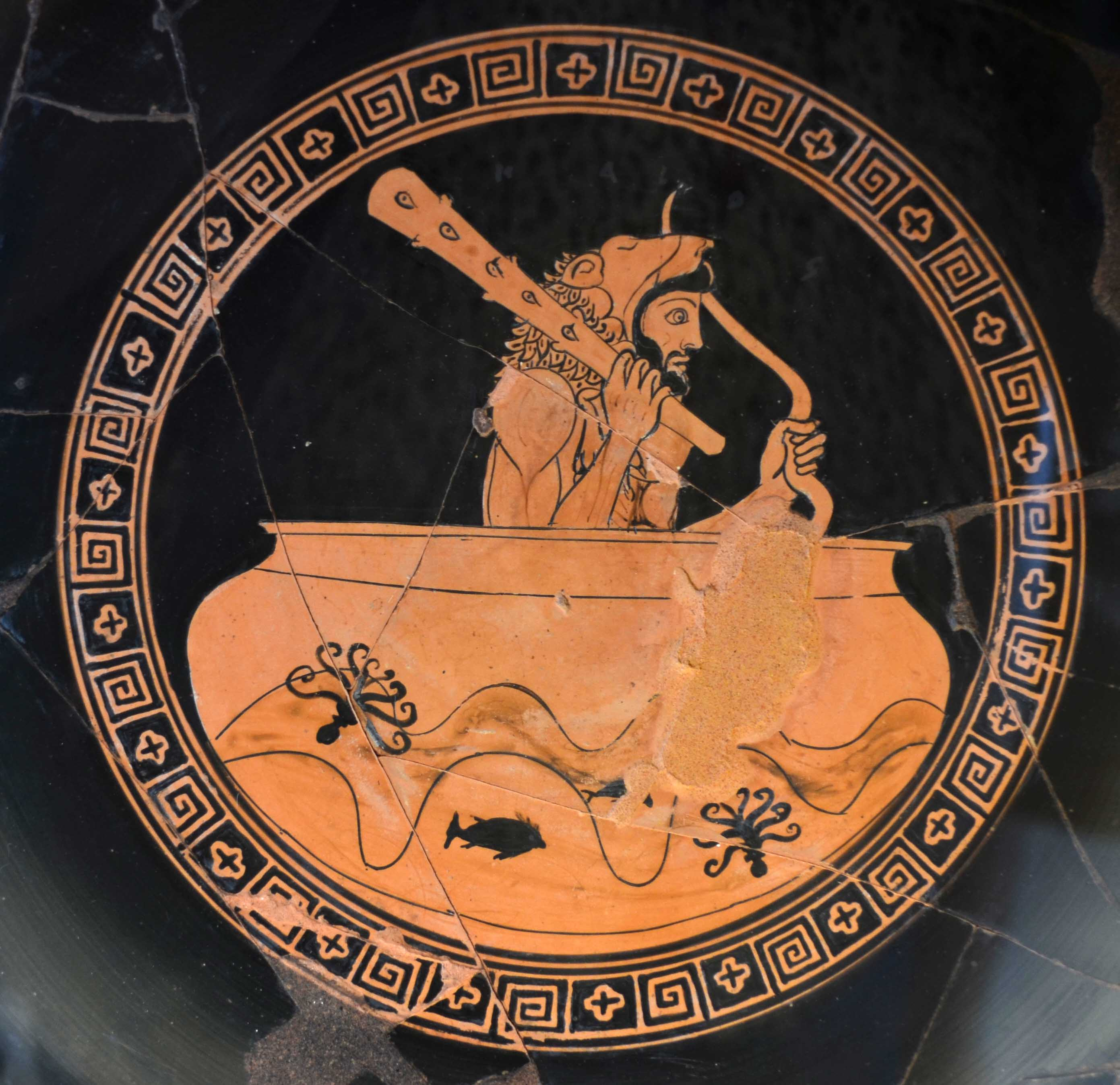
Helios's cup with Heracles in it, Rome, Museo Gregoriano Etrusco, n. 205336.

When Zeus desired to sleep with Alcmene, he made one night last threefold, hiding the light of the Sun, by ordering Helios not to rise for those three days. Satirical author Lucian of Samosata dramatized this myth in one of his Dialogues of the Gods. (Note: Helios (and Lucian) is wrong here; Cronus had Chiron by Philyra.)

While Heracles was travelling to Erytheia to retrieve the cattle of Geryon for his tenth labour, he crossed the Libyan desert and was so frustrated at the heat that he shot an arrow at Helios, the Sun. Almost immediately, Heracles realized his mistake and apologized profusely (Pherecydes wrote that Heracles stretched his arrow at him menacingly, but Helios ordered him to stop, and Heracles in fear desisted); In turn and equally courteous, Helios granted Heracles the golden cup which he used to sail across the sea every night, from the west to the east because he found Heracles's actions immensely bold. In the versions delivered by Apollodorus and Pherecydes, Heracles was only about to shoot Helios, but according to Panyassis, he did shoot and wounded the god.

==== Solar eclipses ====
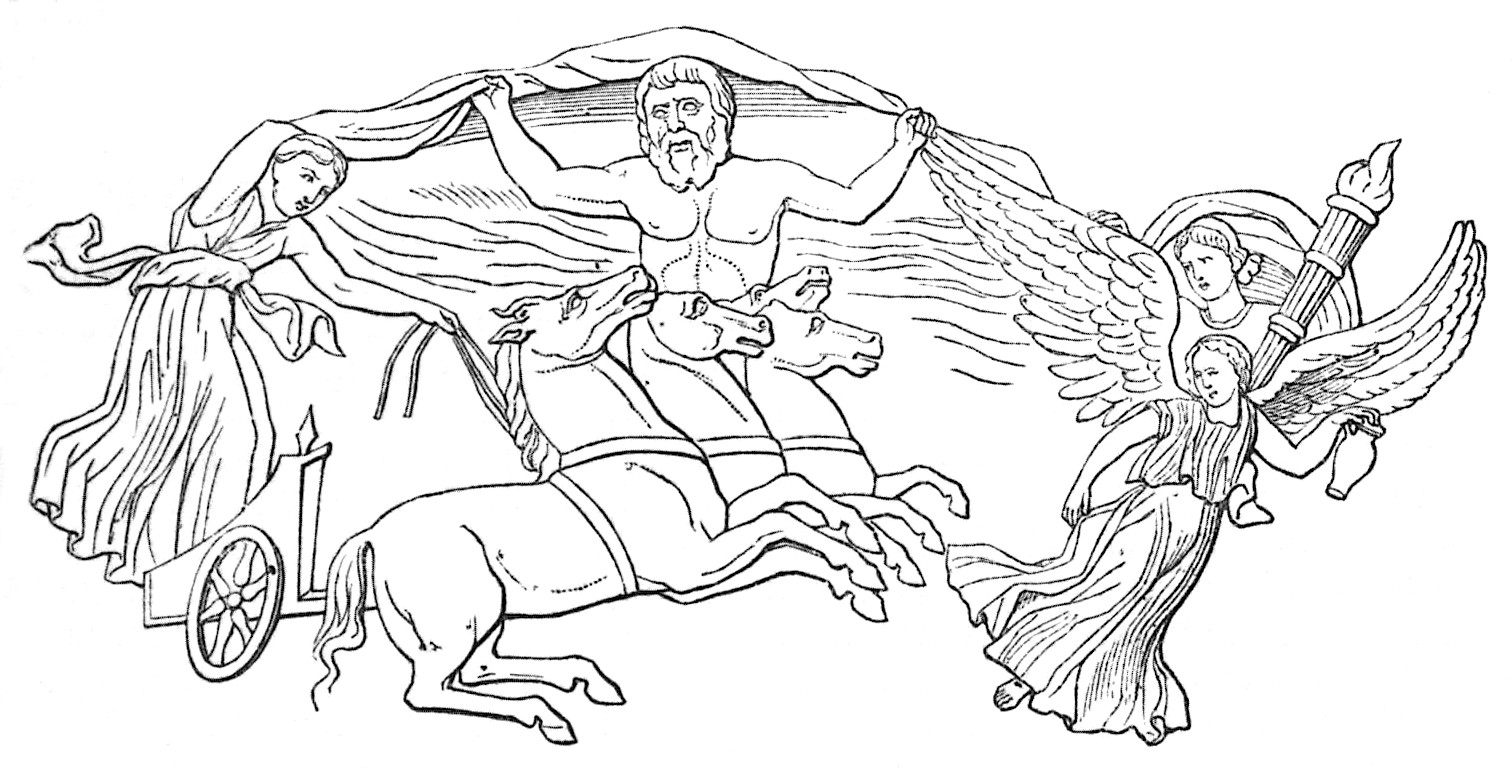
Helios and Eos, carried by the morning dew, above them the god of heaven. Relief from the armor of the statue of Augustus in the Vatican, 1890.

Solar eclipses were phaenomena of fear as well as wonder in Ancient Greece, and were seen as the Sun abandoning humanity. According to a fragment of Archilochus, it is Zeus who blocks Helios and makes him disappear from the sky. In one of his paeans, the lyric poet Pindar describes a solar eclipse as the Sun's light being hidden from the world, a bad omen of destruction and doom:

Beam of the sun! What have you contrived, observant one, mother of eyes, highest star, in concealing yourself in broad daylight? Why have you made helpless men's strength and the path of wisdom, by rushing down a dark highway? Do you drive a stranger course than before? In the name of Zeus, swift driver of horses, I beg you, turn the universal omen, lady, into some painless prosperity for Thebes ... Do you bring a sign of some war or wasting of crops or a mass of snow beyond telling or ruinous strife or emptying of the sea on land or frost on the earth or a rainy summer flowing with raging water, or will you flood the land and create a new race of men from the beginning?

— Pindar, Paean IX

==== Horses of Helios ====
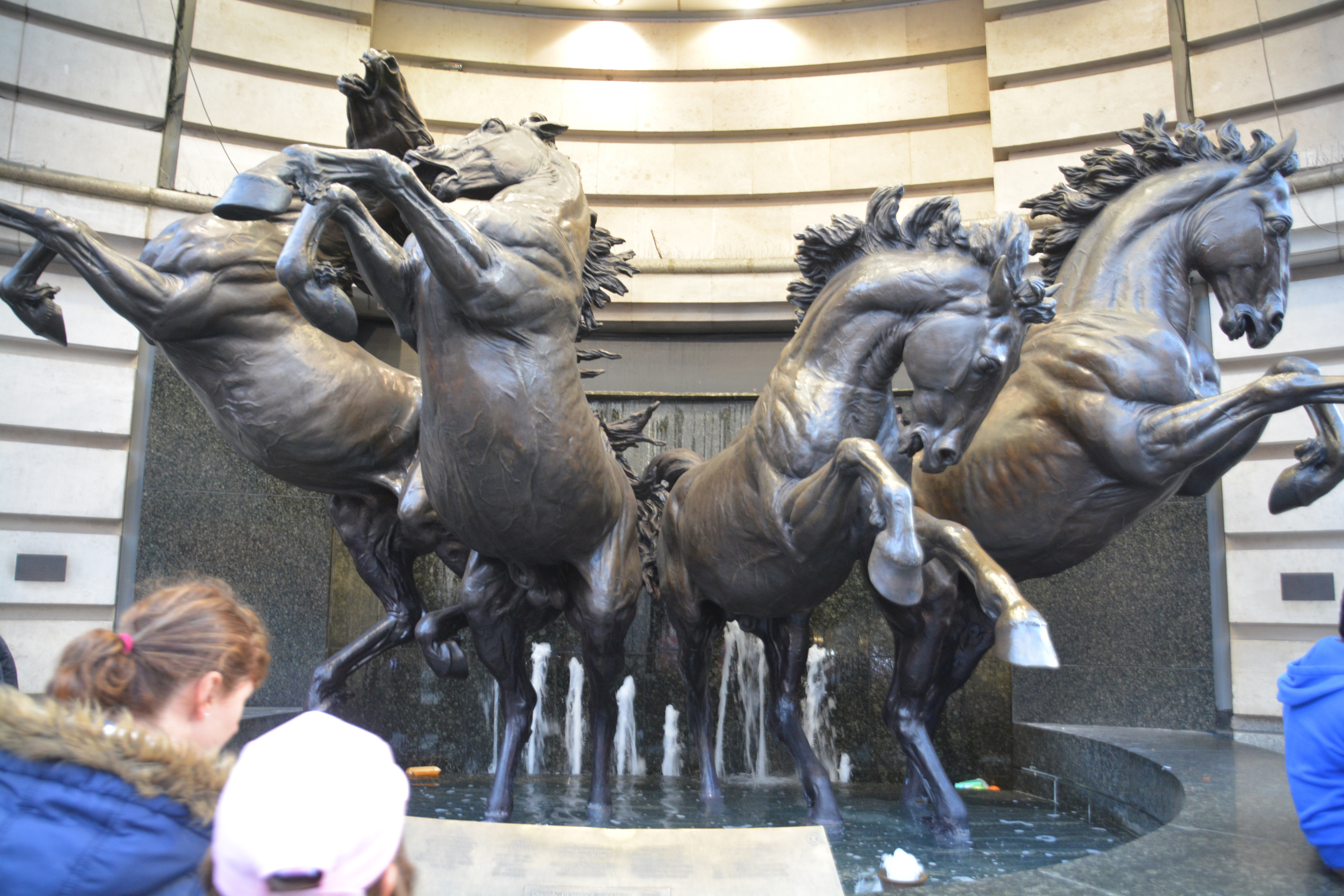
The Horses of Helios, Westminster, London.

Some lists, cited by Hyginus, of the names of horses that pulled Helios's chariot, are as follows. Scholarship acknowledges that, despite differences between the lists, the names of the horses always seem to refer to fire, flame, light and other luminous qualities.

- According to Eumelus of Corinth – late 7th/ early 6th century BC: The male trace horses are Eous (by him the sky is turned) and Aethiops (as if flaming, parches the grain) and the female yoke-bearers are Bronte ("Thunder") and Sterope ("Lightning").
- According to Ovid — Roman, 1st century BC Phaethon's ride: Pyrois ("the fiery one"), Eous ("he of the dawn"), Aethon ("blazing"), and Phlegon ("burning").

Hyginus writes that according to Homer, the horses' names are Abraxas and Therbeeo; but Homer makes no mention of horses or chariot.

Alexander of Aetolia, cited in Athenaeus, related that the magical herb grew on the island Thrinacia, which was sacred to Helios, and served as a remedy against fatigue for the sun god's horses. Aeschrion of Samos informed that it was known as the "dog's-tooth" and was believed to have been sown by Cronus.

=== Awarding of Rhodes ===
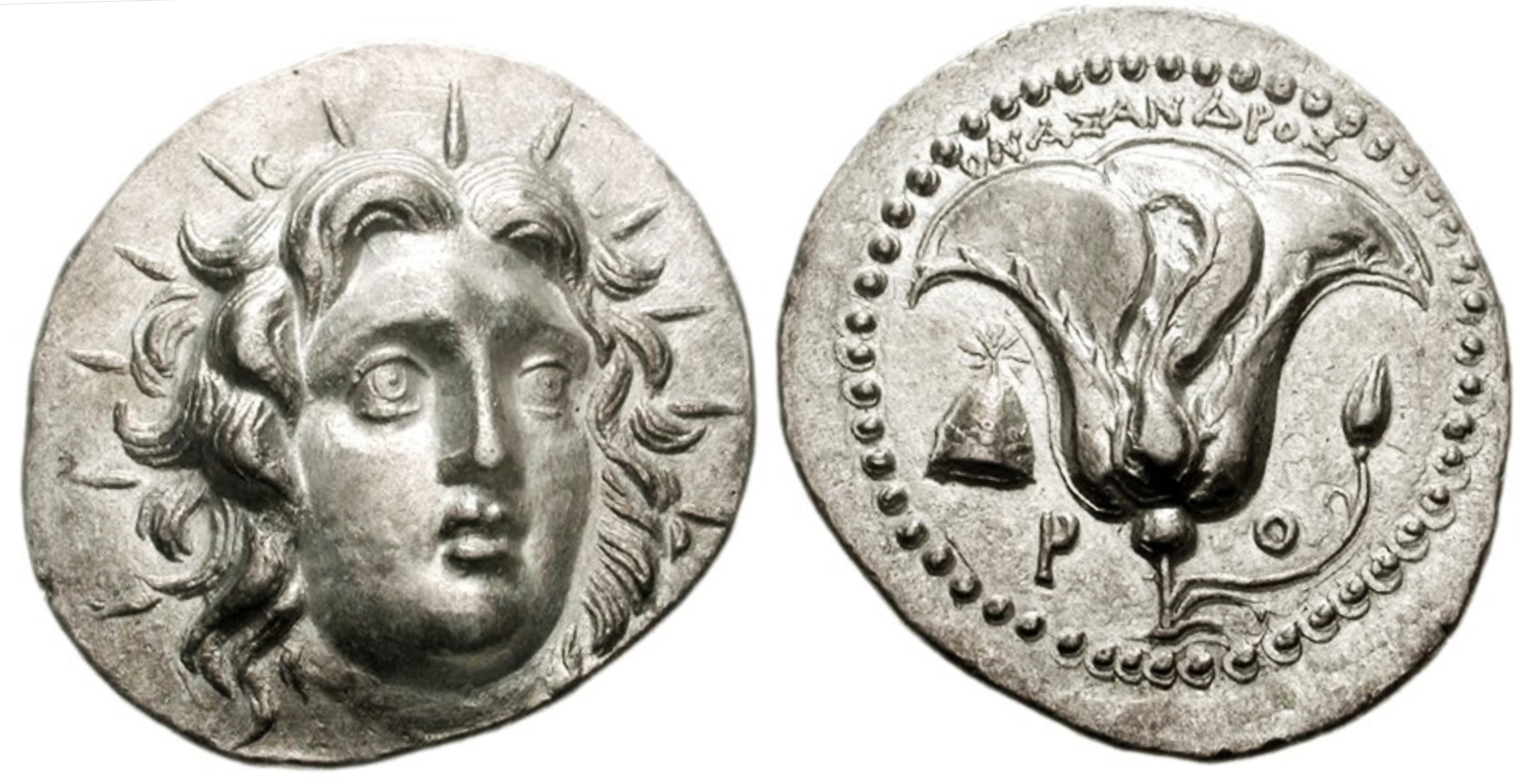
Silver tetradrachm of Rhodes showing Helios and a rose (205-190 BC, 13.48 g)

According to Pindar, when the gods divided the earth among them, Helios was absent, and thus he got no lot of land. He complained to Zeus about it, who offered to do the division of portions again, but Helios refused the offer, for he had seen a new land emerging from the deep of the sea; a rich, productive land for humans and good for cattle too. Helios asked for this island to be given to him, and Zeus agreed to it, with Lachesis (one of the three Fates) raising her hands to confirm the oath. Alternatively in another tradition, it was Helios himself who made the island rise from the sea when he caused the water which had overflowed it to disappear. He named it Rhodes, after his lover Rhode (the daughter of Poseidon and Aphrodite or Amphitrite), and it became the god's sacred island, where he was honoured above all other gods. With Rhode Helios sired seven sons, known as the Heliadae ("sons of the Sun"), who became the first rulers of the island, as well as one daughter, Electryone. Three of their grandsons founded the cities Ialysos, Camiros and Lindos on the island, named after themselves; thus Rhodes came to belong to him and his line, with the autochthonous peoples of Rhodes claiming descend from the Heliadae.

=== Phaethon ===
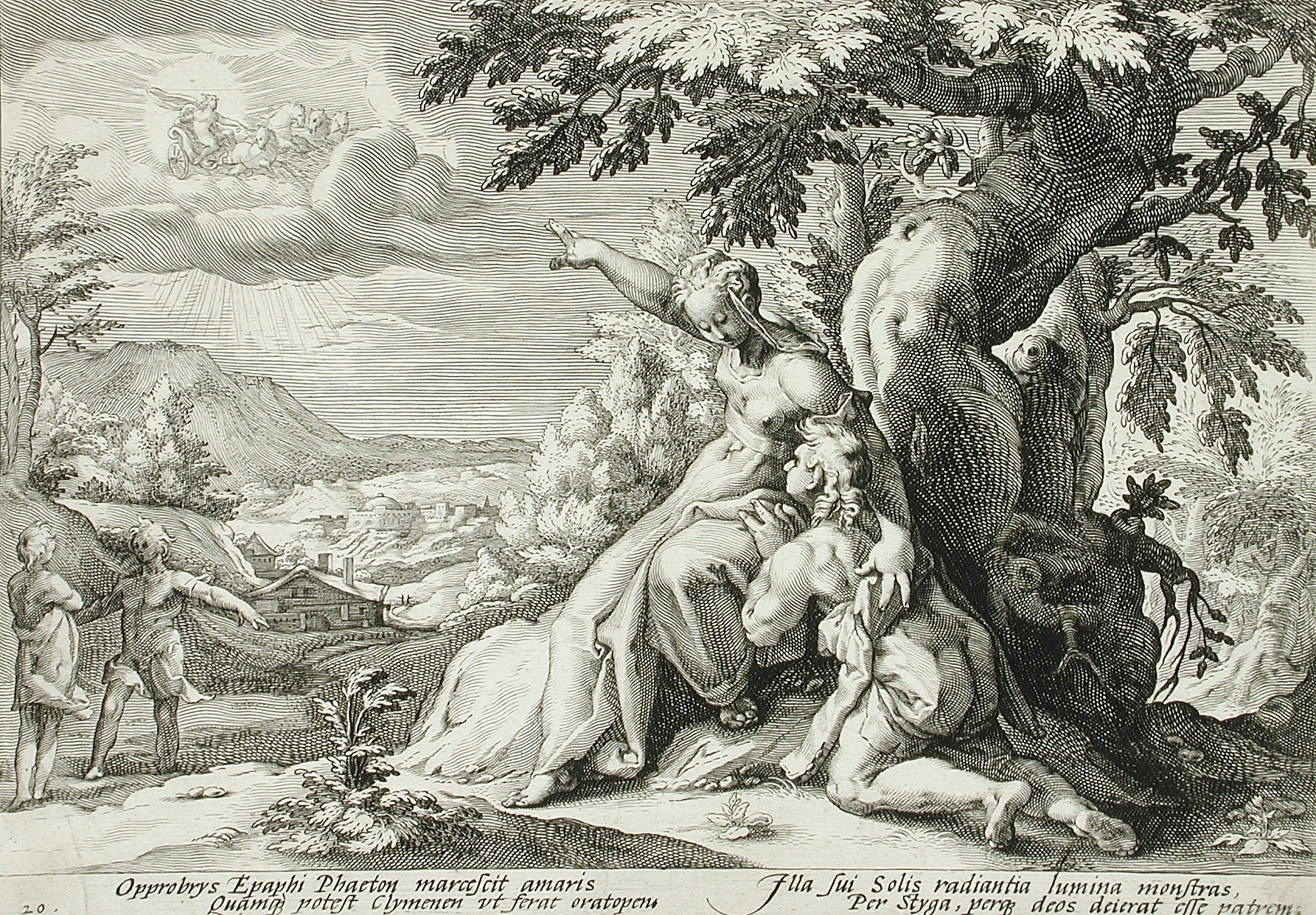
Clymene urges Phaethon to find his father, 1589 engraving by Hendrik Goltzius.

The most well known story about Helios is the one involving his son Phaethon, who asked him to drive his chariot for a single day. Although all versions agree that Phaethon eventually got to drive Helios's chariot, and that he failed in his task with disastrous results, there are a great number of details that vary by version, including the identity of Phaethon's mother, the location the story takes place, the role Phaethon's sisters the Heliades play, the motivation behind Phaethon's decision to ask his father Helios for such thing, and even the exact relation between the god and the mortals involved.

Traditionally, Phaethon was Helios's son by the Oceanid nymph Clymene, or alternatively Rhode or the otherwise unknown Prote. In one version of the story, Phaethon is Helios's grandson, rather than son, through the boy's father Clymenus. In this version, Phaethon's mother is an Oceanid nymph named Merope.

In Euripides's lost play Phaethon, surviving only in twelve fragments, Phaethon is the product of an illicit liaison between his mother Clymene (who is now married to Merops, the king of Aethiopia) and Helios, though she claimed that her lawful husband was the father of her all her children. Clymene reveals the truth to her son, and urges him to travel east to get confirmation from his father after she informs him that Helios promised to grant their child any wish when he slept with her. Although reluctant at first, Phaethon is convinced and sets on to find his birth father. In a surviving fragment from the play, Helios accompanies his son in his ill-fated journey in the skies, trying to give him instructions on how to drive the chariot while he rides on a spare horse named Sirius, as someone, perhaps a paedagogus informs Clymene of Phaethon's fate, who is probably accompanied by slave women:

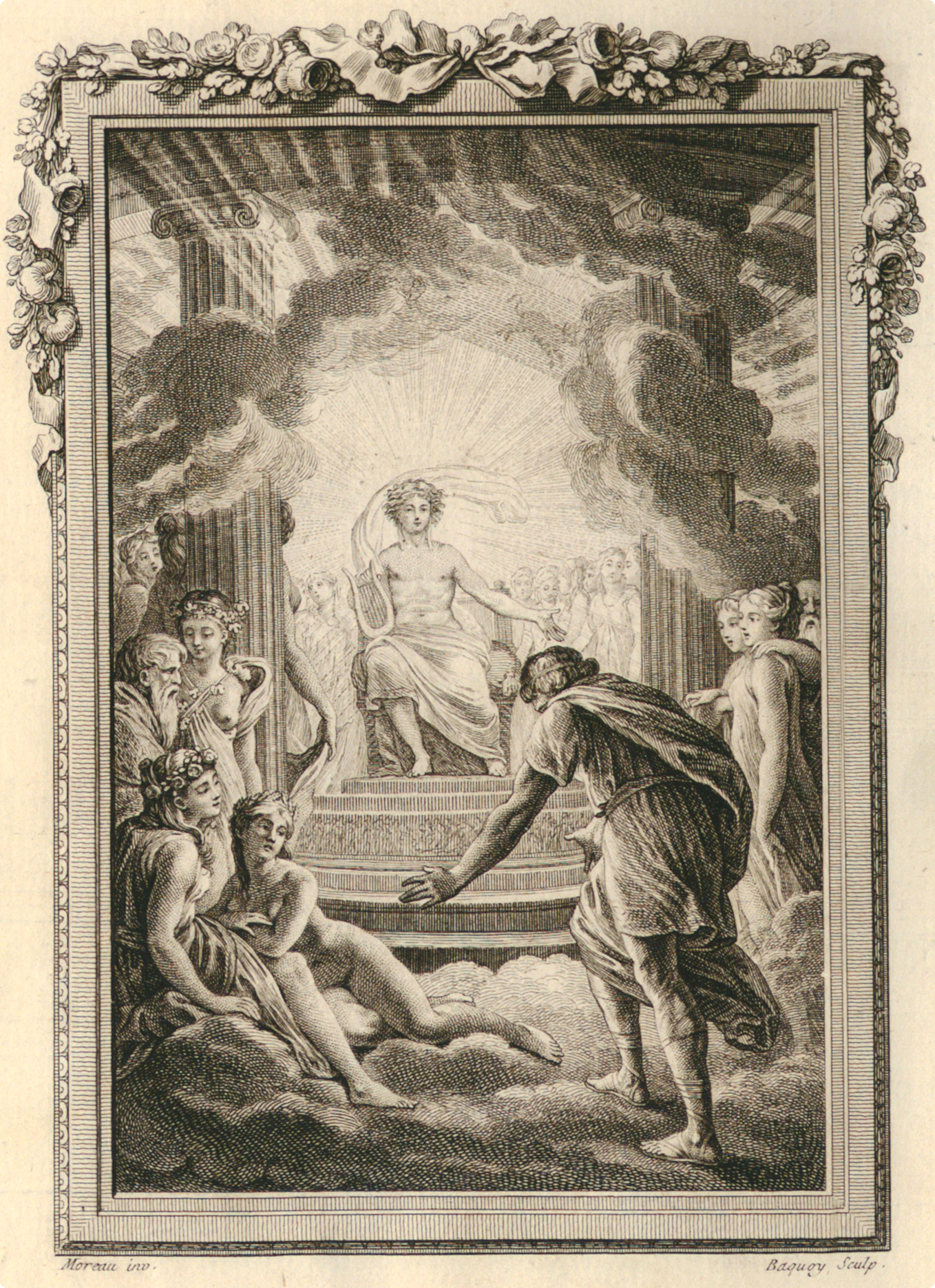
Phaethon meets the Sun, engraving for the Metamorphoses.

Take, for instance, that passage in which Helios, in handing the reins to his son, says—

"Drive on, but shun the burning Libyan tract;
The hot dry air will let thine axle down:
Toward the seven Pleiades keep thy steadfast way."

And then—

"This said, his son undaunted snatched the reins,
Then smote the winged coursers' sides: they bound
Forth on the void and cavernous vault of air.
His father mounts another steed, and rides
With warning voice guiding his son. 'Drive there!
Turn, turn thy car this way."

— Euripides, Phaethon frag 779

If this messenger did witness the flight himself, it is possible there was also a passage where he described Helios taking control over the bolting horses in the same manner as Lucretius described. Phaethon inevitably dies; a fragment near the end of the play has Clymene order the slave girls hide Phaethon's still-smouldering body from Merops, and laments Helios's role in her son's death, saying he destroyed him and her both. Near the end of the play it seems that Merops, having found out about Clymene's affair and Phaethon's true parentage, tries to kill her; her eventual fate is unclear, but it has been suggested she is saved by some deus ex machina. A number of deities have been proposed for the identity of this possible deus ex machina, with Helios among them.

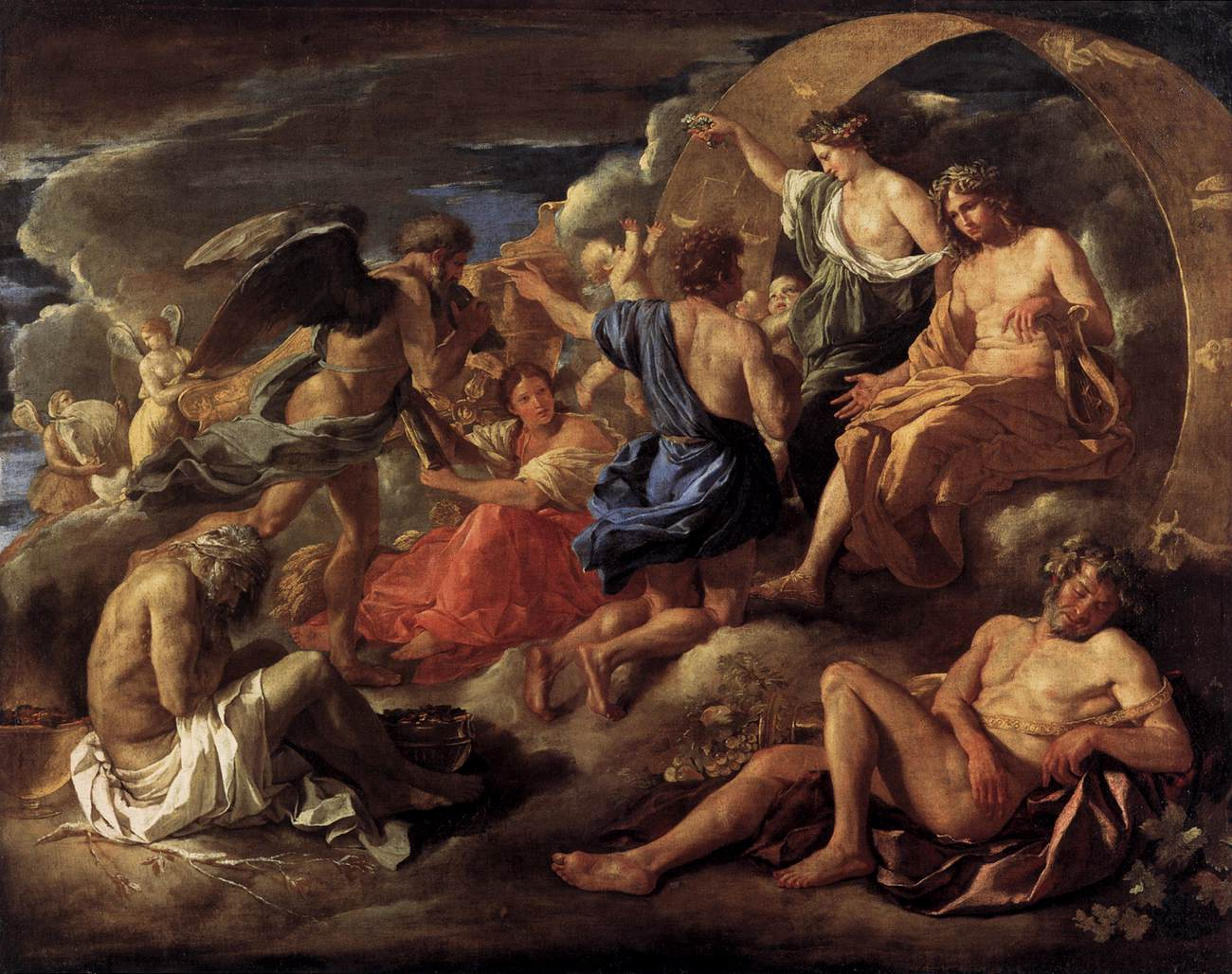
Helios and Phaethon with Saturn and the Four Seasons, by Nicolas Poussin, oil on canvas

In Ovid's account, Zeus's son Epaphus mocks Phaethon's claim that he is the son of the sun god; his mother Clymene tells Phaethon to go to Helios himself, to ask for confirmation of his paternity. Helios promises him on the river Styx any gift that he might ask as a proof of paternity; Phaethon asks for the privilege to drive Helios's chariot for a single day. Although Helios warns his son of how dangerous and disastrous this would be, he is nevertheless unable to change Phaethon's mind or revoke his promise. Phaethon takes the reins, and the earth burns when he travels too low, and freezes when he takes the chariot too high. Zeus strikes Phaethon with lightning, killing him. Helios refuses to resume his job, but he returns to his task and duty at the appeal of the other gods, as well as Zeus's threats. He then takes his anger out on his four horses, whipping them in fury for causing his son's death.

Nonnus of Panopolis presented a slightly different version of the myth, narrated by Hermes; according to him, Helios met and fell in love with Clymene, the daughter of the Ocean, and the two soon got married with her father's blessing. When he grows up, fascinated with his father's job, he asks him to drive his chariot for a single day. Helios does his best to dissuade him, arguing that sons are not necessarily fit to step into their fathers' shoes. But under pressure of Phaethon and Clymene's begging both, he eventually gives in. As per all other versions of the myth, Phaethon's ride is catastrophic and ends in his death.

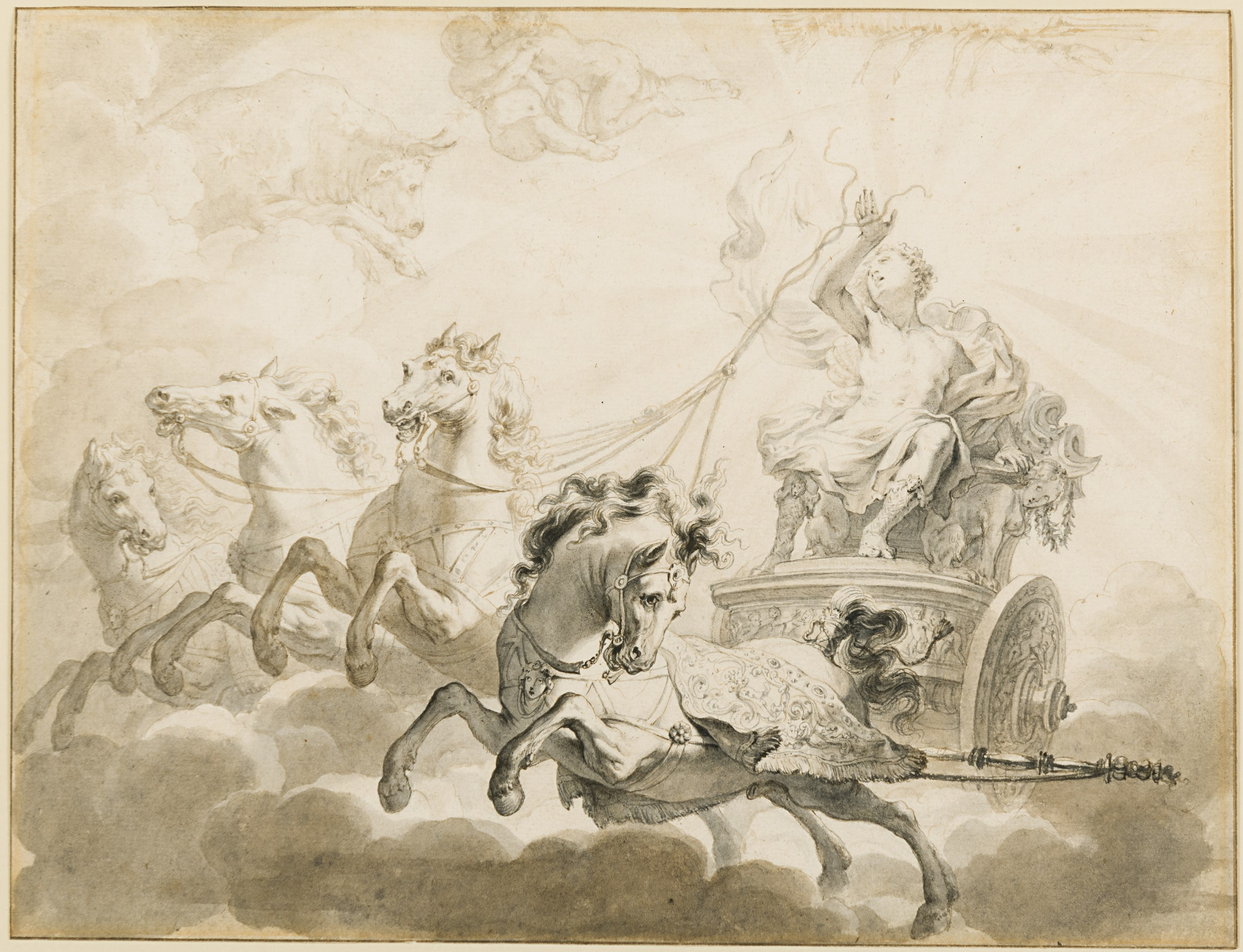
Phaethon in the Chariot of the Sun, Godfried Maes, ca 1664-1700

Hyginus wrote that Phaethon secretly mounted his father's car without said father's knowledge and leave, but with the aid of his sisters the Heliades who yoked the horses.

In all retellings, Helios recovers the reins in time, thus saving the earth. Another consistent detail across versions are that Phaethon's sisters the Heliades mourn him by the Eridanus and are turned into black poplar trees, who shed tears of amber. According to Quintus Smyrnaeus, their tears in honour of Phaethon were turned into amber by Helios. In one version of the myth, Helios conveyed his dead son to the stars, as a constellation (the Auriga).

=== The Watchman ===
==== Persephone ====
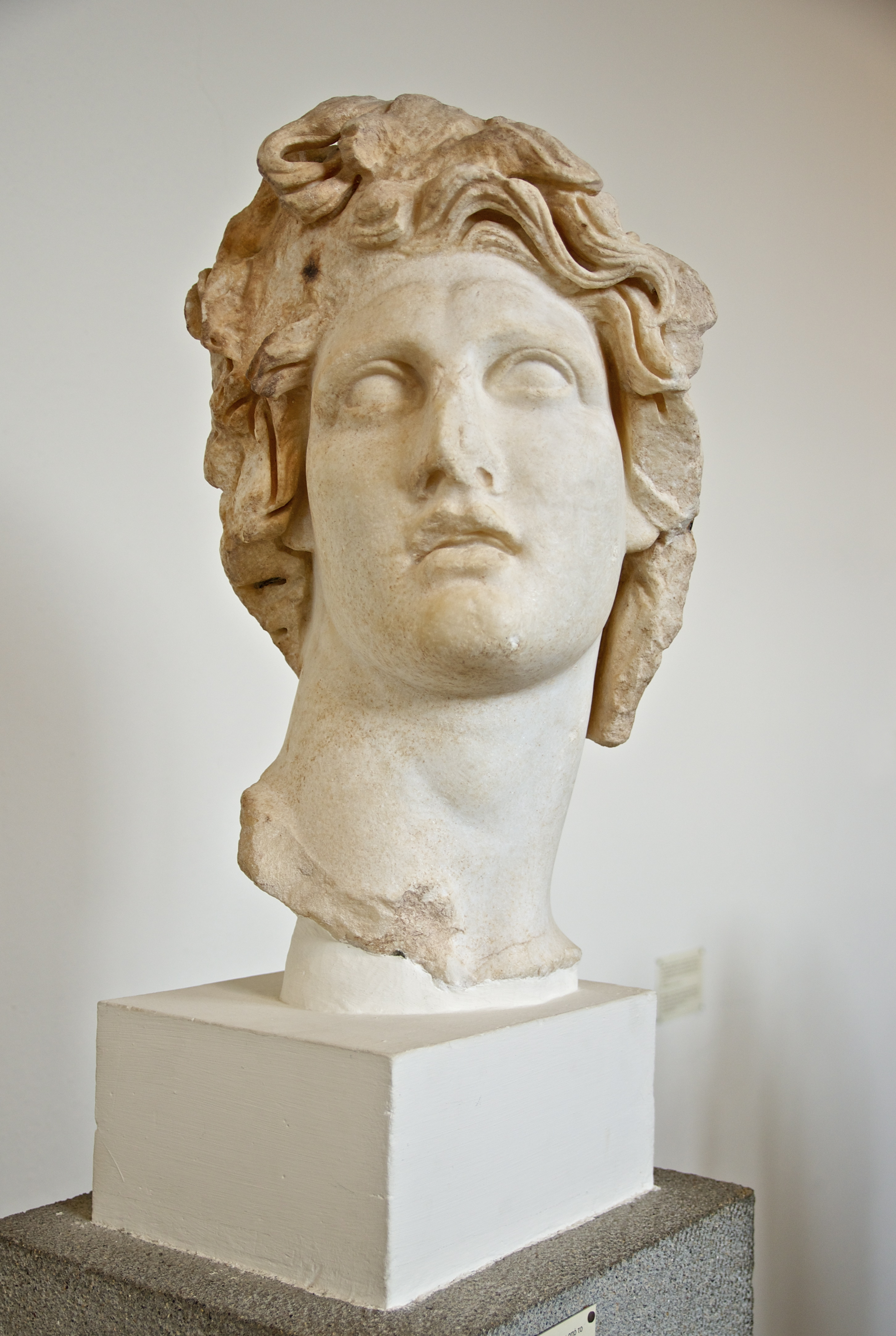
Head of Helios, middle period, Archaeological Museum of Rhodes

But, Goddess, give up for good your great lamentation.
You must not nurse in vain insatiable anger.
Among the gods Aidoneus is not an unsuitable bridegroom,
Commander-of-Many and Zeus's own brother of the same stock.
As for honor, he got his third at the world's first division
and dwells with those whose rule has fallen to his lot.

— Homeric Hymn to Demeter, lines 82–87, translated by Helene Foley

Helios is said to have seen and stood witness to everything that happened where his light shone. When Hades abducts Persephone, Helios is the only one to witness it.

In Ovid's Fasti, Demeter asks the stars first about Persephone's whereabouts, and it is Helice who advises her to go ask Helios. Demeter is not slow to approach him, and Helios then tells her not to waste time, and seek out for "the queen of the third world".

==== Ares and Aphrodite ====
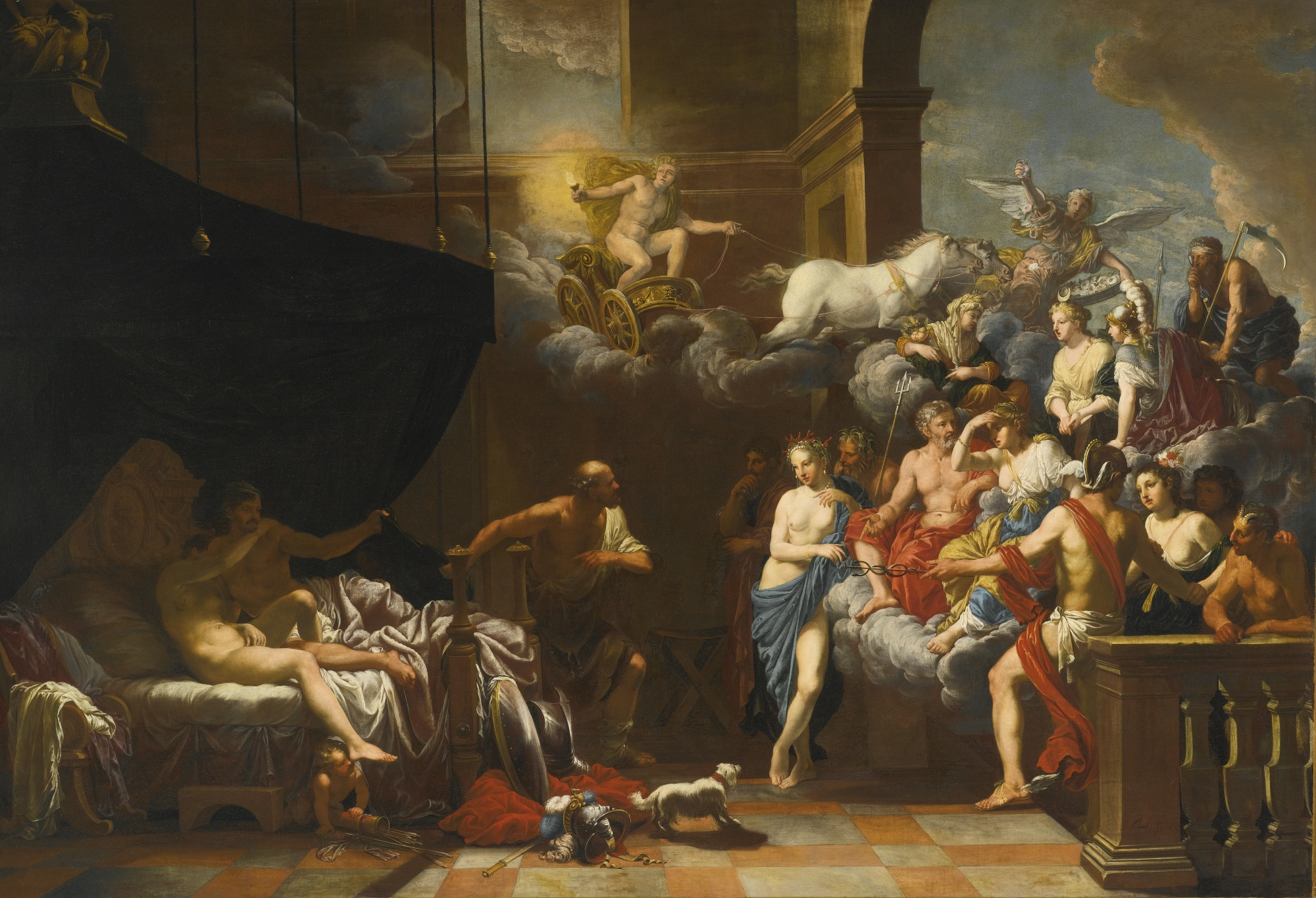
Vulcan surprises Venus and Mars, by Johann Heiss (1679)

In another myth, Aphrodite was married to Hephaestus, but she cheated on him with his brother Ares, god of war. In Book Eight of the Odyssey, the blind singer Demodocus describes how the illicit lovers committed adultery, until one day Helios caught them in the act, and immediately informed Aphrodite's husband Hephaestus. Upon learning that, Hephaestus forged a net so thin it could hardly be seen, in order to ensnare them. He then announced that he was leaving for Lemnos. Upon hearing that, Ares went to Aphrodite and the two lovers coupled. Once again Helios informed Hephaestus, who came into the room and trapped them in the net. He then called the other gods to witness the humiliating sight.

Much later versions add a young man to the story, a warrior named Alectryon, tasked by Ares to stand guard should anyone approach. But Alectryon fell asleep, allowing Helios to discover the two lovers and inform Hephaestus. For this, Aphrodite hated Helios and his race for all time. In some versions, she cursed his daughter Pasiphaë to fall in love with the Cretan Bull as revenge against him. Pasiphaë's daughter Phaedra's passion for her step-son Hippolytus was also said to have been inflicted on her by Aphrodite for this same reason.

==== Leucothoe and Clytie ====
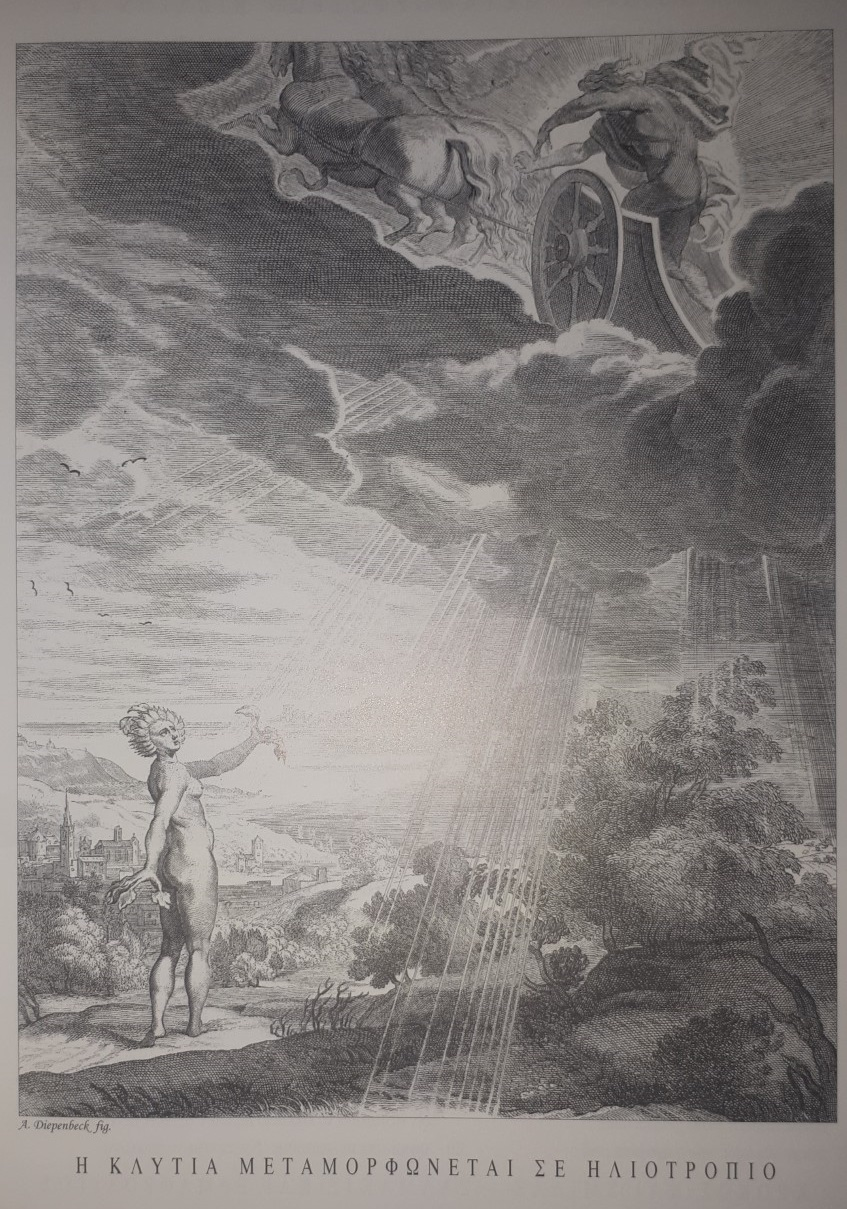
Clytie turns into a sunflower as the Sun refuses to look at her, engraving by Abraham van Diepenbeeck.

Aphrodite aims to enact her revenge by making Helios fall for a mortal princess named Leucothoe, forgetting his previous lover the Oceanid Clytie for her sake. Helios watches her from above, even making the winter days longer so he can have more time looking at her. Taking the form of her mother Eurynome, Helios enters their palace, entering the girl's room before revealing himself to her.

However, Clytie informs Leucothoe's father Orchamus of this affair, and he buries Leucothoe alive in the earth. Helios comes too late to rescue her, so instead he pours nectar into the earth, and turns the dead Leucothoe into a frankincense tree. Clytie, spurned by Helios for her role in his lover's death, strips herself naked, accepting no food or drink, and sits on a rock for nine days, pining after him, until eventually turning into a purple, sun-gazing flower, the heliotrope. This myth, it has been theorized, might have been used to explain the use of frankincense aromatic resin in Helios's worship. Leucothoe being buried alive as punishment by a male guardian, which is not too unlike Antigone's own fate, may also indicate an ancient tradition involving human sacrifice in a vegetation cult. At first the stories of Leucothoe and Clytie might have been two distinct myths concerning Helios which were later combined along with a third story, that of Helios discovering Ares and Aphrodite's affair and then informing Hephaestus, into a single tale either by Ovid himself or his source.

==== Other ====
In Sophocles's play Ajax, Ajax the Great, minutes before committing suicide, calls upon Helios to stop his golden reins when he reaches Ajax's native land of Salamis and inform his aging father Telamon and his mother of their son's fate and death, and salutes him one last time before he kills himself.

=== Involvement in wars ===
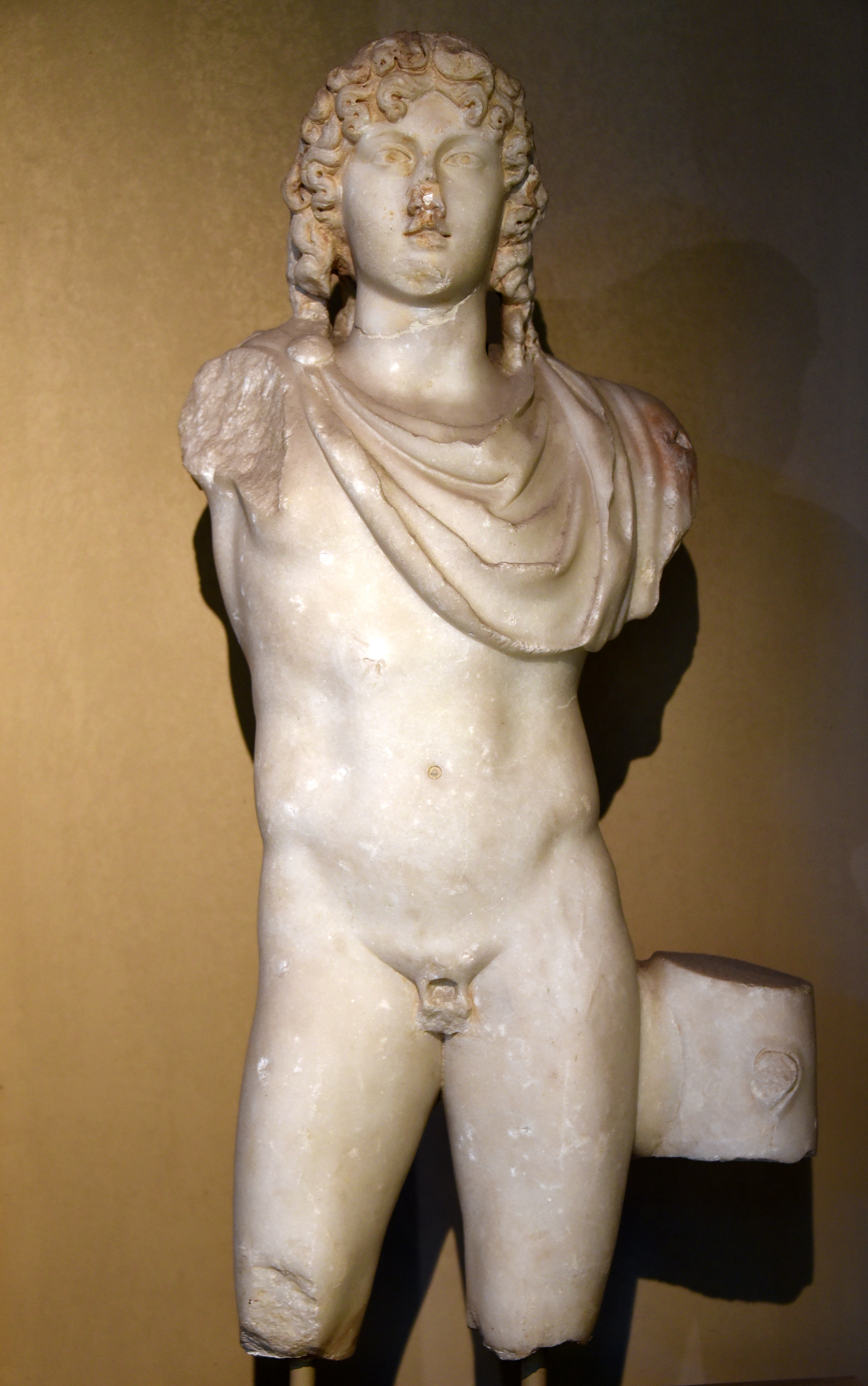
Helios from the Silahtarağa Statuary Group depicting the Gigantomachy, 2nd century AD, Archaeological Museum of Istanbul.

Helios sides with the other gods in several battles. Surviving fragments from Titanomachy imply scenes where Helios is the only one among the Titans to have abstained from attacking the Olympian gods, and they, after the war was over, gave him a place in the sky and awarded him with his chariot.

He also takes part in the Giant wars; it was said by Pseudo-Apollodorus that during the battle of the Giants against the gods, the giant Alcyoneus stole Helios's cattle from Erytheia where the god kept them, or alternatively, that it was Alcyoneus's very theft of the cattle that started the war. Because the earth goddess Gaia, mother and ally of the Giants, learned of the prophecy that the giants would perish at the hand of a mortal, she sought to find a magical herb that would protect them and render them practically indestructible; thus Zeus ordered Helios, as well as his sisters Selene (Moon) and Eos (Dawn) not to shine, and harvested all of the plant for himself, denying Gaia the opportunity to make the Giants immortal, while Athena summoned the mortal Heracles to fight by their side.

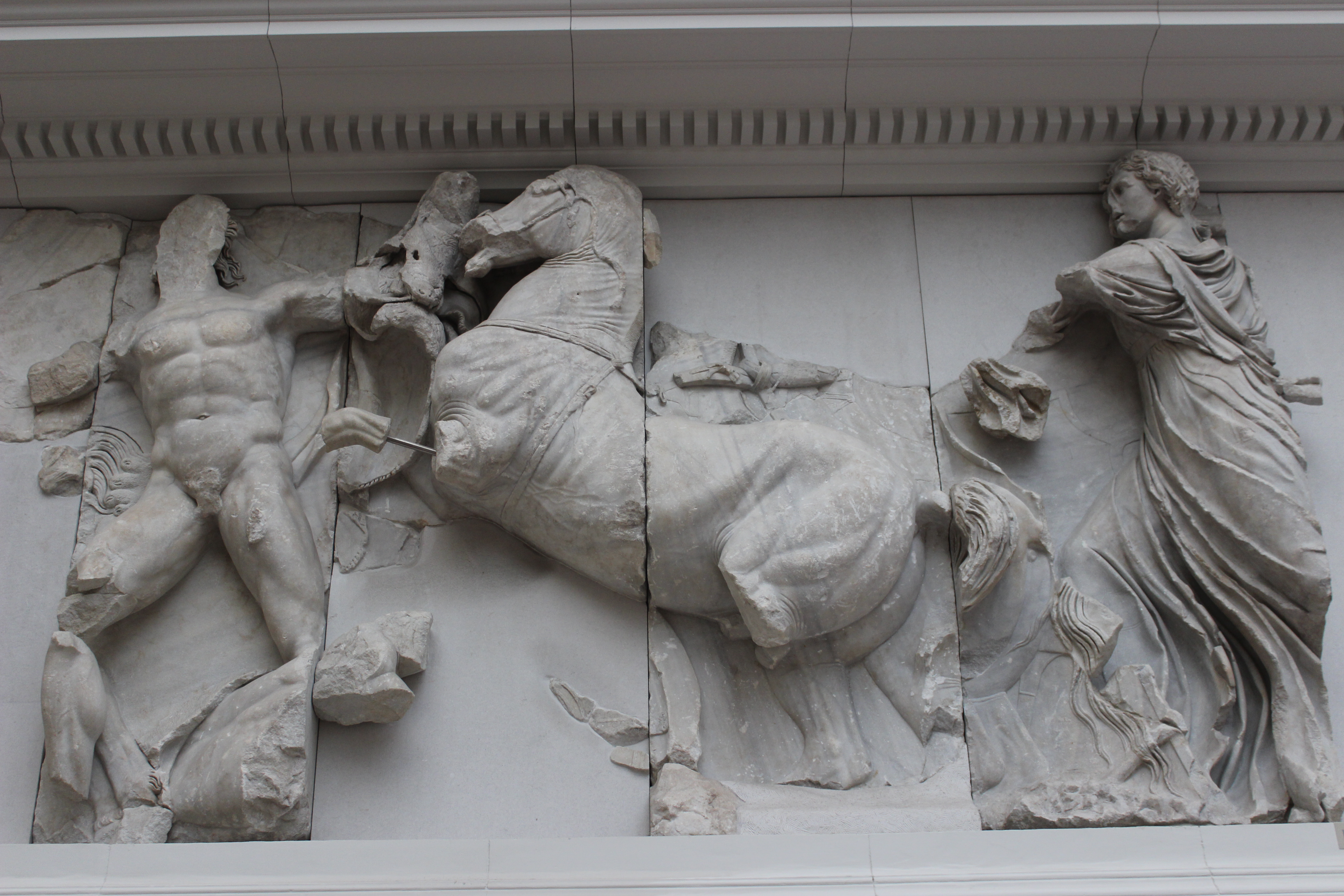
Helios on his chariot fighting a Giant, detail of the Gigantomachy frieze, Pergamon Altar, Pergamon museum, Berlin

At some point during the battle of gods and giants in Phlegra, Helios takes up an exhausted Hephaestus on his chariot. After the war ends, one of the giants, Picolous, flees to Aeaea, where Helios's daughter, Circe, lived. He attempted to chase Circe away from the island, only to be killed by Helios. From the blood of the slain giant that dripped on the earth a new plant was sprang, the herb moly, named thus from the battle ("malos" in Ancient Greek).

Helios is depicted in the Pergamon Altar, waging war against Giants next to Eos, Selene, and Theia in the southern frieze.

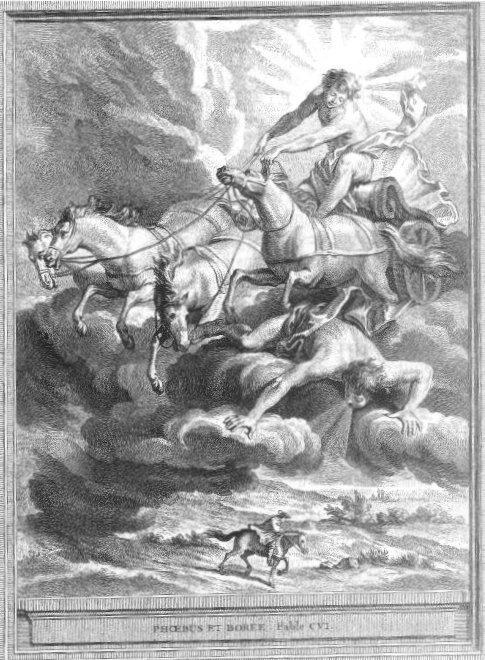
Phoebus and Boreas, Jean-Baptiste Oudry's cosmic interpretation of La Fontaine's fable, 1729/34

=== Clashes and punishments ===
==== Gods ====
A myth about the origin of Corinth goes as such: Helios and Poseidon clashed as to who would get to have the city. The Hecatoncheir Briareos was tasked to settle the dispute between the two gods; he awarded the Acrocorinth to Helios, while Poseidon was given the isthmus of Corinth.

Aelian wrote that Nerites was the son of the sea god Nereus and the Oceanid Doris. In the version where Nerites became the lover of Poseidon, it is said that Helios turned him into a shellfish, for reasons unknown. At first Aelian writes that Helios was resentful of the boy's speed, but when trying to explain why he changed his form, he suggests that perhaps Poseidon and Helios were rivals in love.

In an Aesop fable, Helios and the north wind god Boreas argued about which one between them was the strongest god. They agreed that whoever was able to make a passing traveller remove his cloak would be declared the winner. Boreas was the one to try his luck first; but no matter how hard he blew, he could not remove the man's cloak, instead making him wrap his cloak around him even tighter. Helios shone bright then, and the traveller, overcome with the heat, removed his cloak, giving him the victory. The moral is that persuasion is better than force.

==== Mortals ====
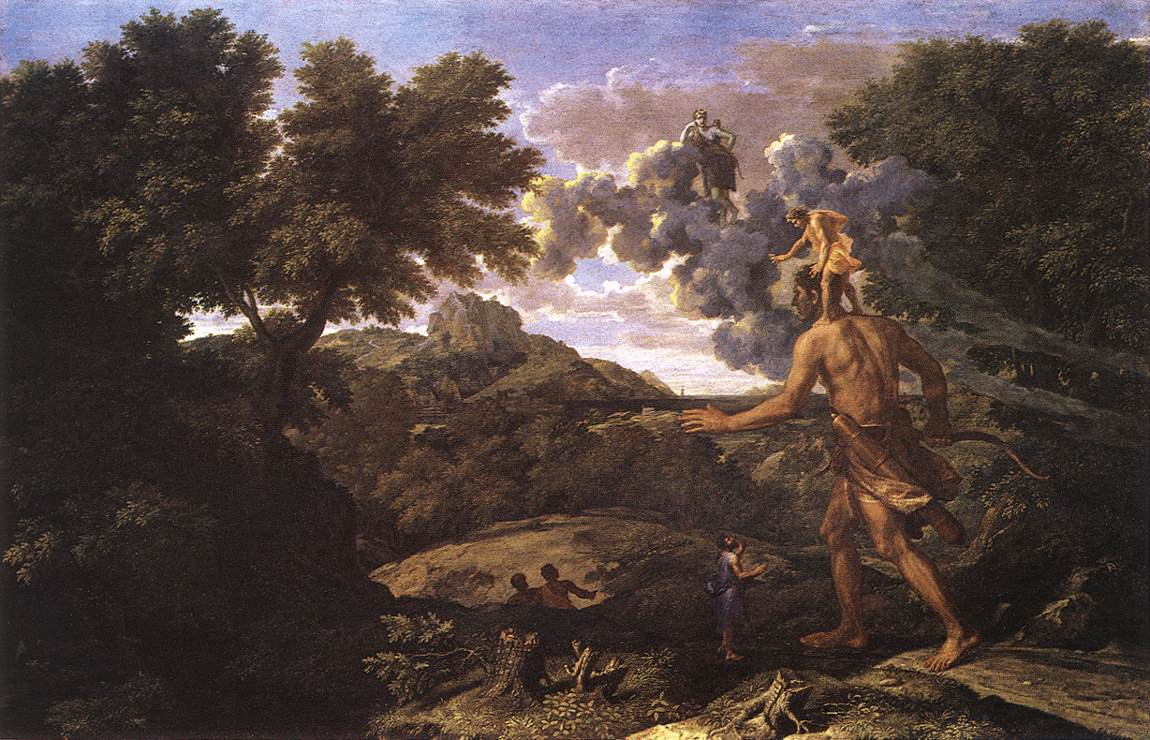
Blind Orion Searching for the Rising Sun, by Nicolas Poussin, 1658, oil on canvas

Relating to his nature as the Sun, Helios was presented as a god who could restore and deprive people of vision, as it was regarded that his light that made the faculty of sight and enabled visible things to be seen. In one myth, after Orion was blinded by King Oenopion, he traveled to the east, where he met Helios. Helios then healed Orion's eyes, restoring his eyesight. In Phineus's story, his blinding, as reported in Apollonius Rhodius's Argonautica, was Zeus's punishment for Phineus revealing the future to mankind. According, however, to one of the alternative versions, it was Helios who had deprived Phineus of his sight. Pseudo-Oppian wrote that Helios's wrath was due to some obscure victory of the prophet; after Calais and Zetes slew the Harpies tormenting Phineus, Helios then turned him into a mole, a blind creature. In yet another version, he blinded Phineus at the request of his son Aeëtes.

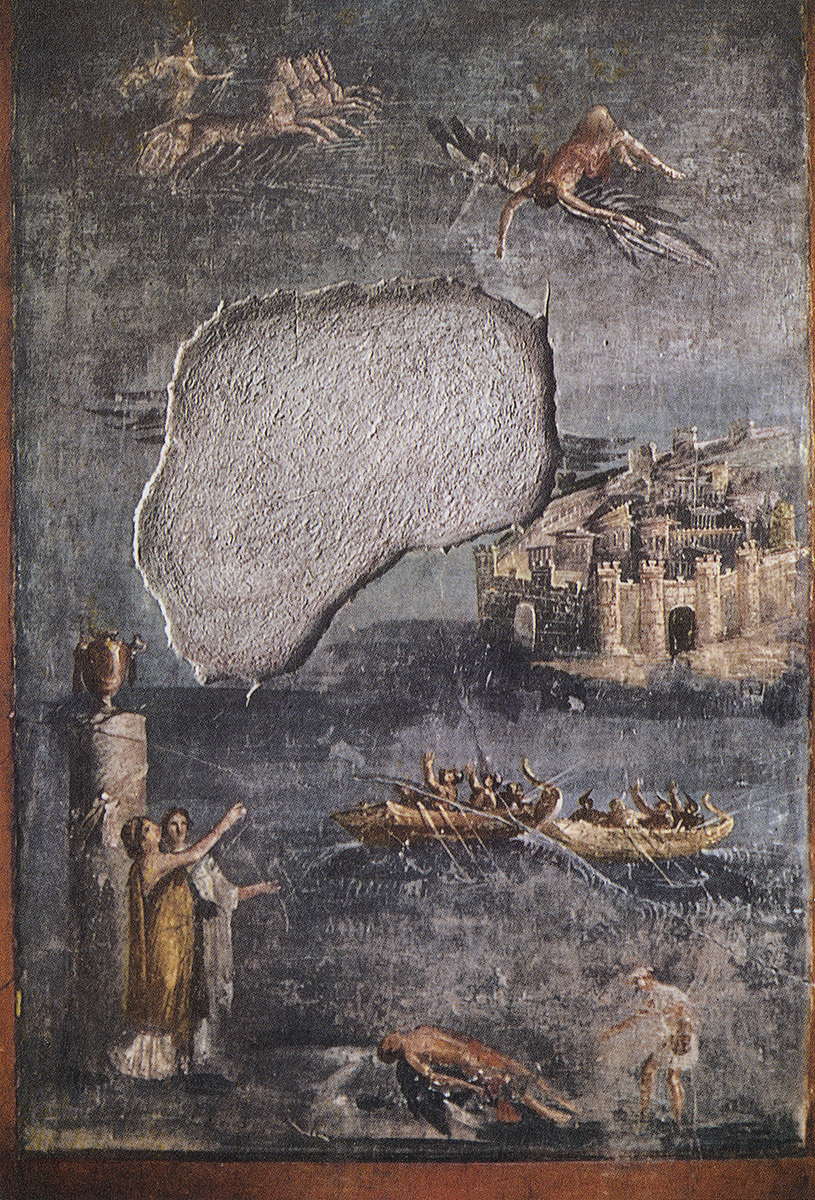
The Fall of Icarus, ancient fresco from Pompeii, ca 40-79 AD

In another tale, the Athenian inventor Daedalus and his young son Icarus fashioned themselves wings made of birds' feathers glued together with wax and flew away. According to scholia on Euripides, Icarus, being young and rashful, thought himself greater than Helios. Angered, Helios hurled his rays at him, melting the wax and plunging Icarus into the sea to drown. Later, it was Helios who decreed that said sea would be named after the unfortunate youth, the Icarian Sea.

Arge was a huntress who, while hunting down a particularly fast stag, claimed that fast as the Sun as it was, she would eventually catch up to it. Helios, offended by the girl's words, changed her shape into that of a doe.

In one rare version of Smyrna's tale, it was an angry Helios who cursed her to fall in love with her own father Cinyras because of some unspecified offence the girl committed against him; in the vast majority of other versions however, the culprit behind Smyrna's curse is the goddess of love Aphrodite.

=== Oxen of the Sun ===
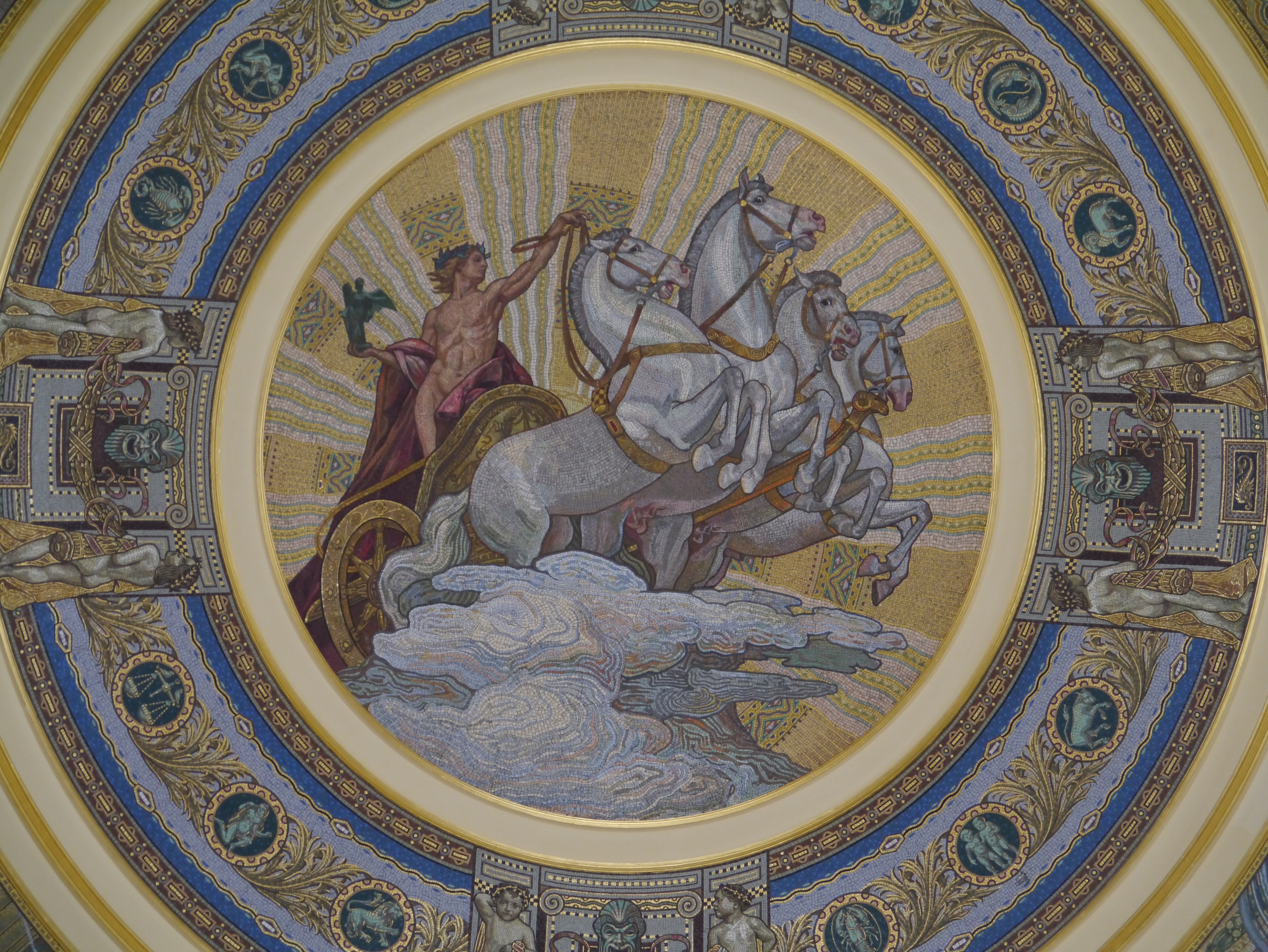
Helios and chariot depicted on the dome of the entrance hall of the Széchenyi Bath, Budapest

Helios is said to have kept his sheep and cattle on his sacred island of Thrinacia, or in some cases Erytheia. Each flock numbers fifty beasts, totaling 350 cows and 350 sheep—the number of days of the year in the early Ancient Greek calendar; the seven herds correspond to the week, containing seven days. The cows did not breed or die. In the Homeric Hymn 4 to Hermes, after Hermes has been brought before Zeus by an angry Apollo for stealing Apollo's sacred cows, the young god excuses himself for his actions and says to his father that "I reverence Helios greatly and the other gods".

Augeas, who in some versions is his son, safe-keeps a herd of twelve bulls sacred to the god. Moreover, it was said that Augeas's enormous herd of cattle was a gift to him by his father.

Apollonia in Illyria was another place where he kept a flock of his sheep; a man named Peithenius had been put in charge of them, but the sheep were devoured by wolves. The other Apolloniates, thinking he had been neglectful, gouged out Peithenius's eyes. Angered over the man's treatment, Helios made the earth grow barren and ceased to bear fruit; the earth grew fruitful again only after the Apolloniates had propitiated Peithenius by craft, and by two suburbs and a house he picked out, pleasing the god. This story is also attested by Greek historian Herodotus, who calls the man Evenius.

==== Odyssey ====
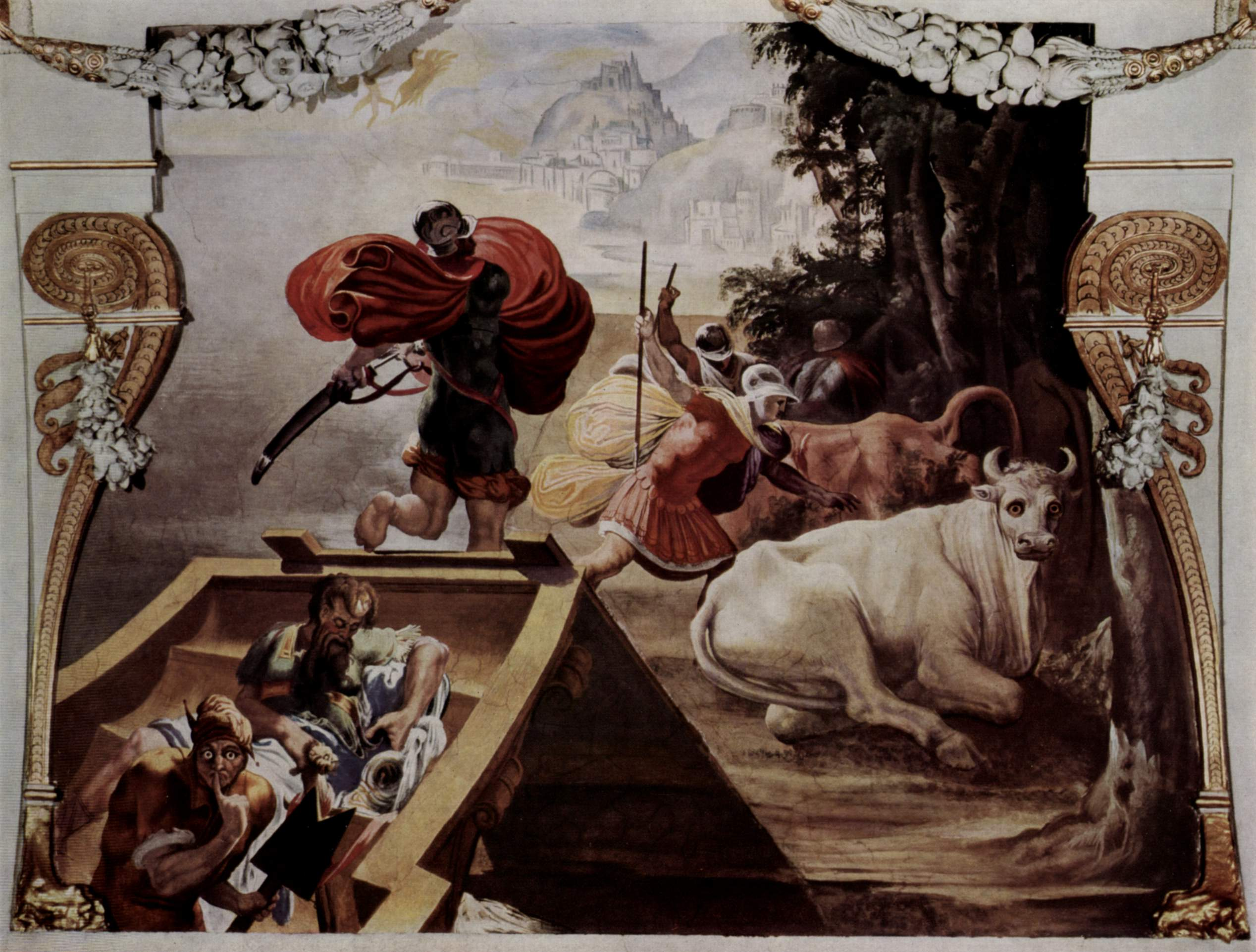
The companions of Odysseus rob the cattle of Helios, fresco by Palazzo Poggi, 1556.

During Odysseus's journey to get back home, he arrives at the island of Circe, who warns him not to touch Helios's sacred cows once he reaches Thrinacia, or the god would keep them from returning home. Though Odysseus warns his men, when supplies run short they kill and eat some of the cattle. The guardians of the island, Helios's daughters Phaethusa and Lampetia, tell their father about this. Helios then appeals to Zeus telling him to dispose of Odysseus's men, rejecting the crewmen's compensation of a new temple in Ithaca. Zeus destroys the ship with his lightning bolt, killing all the men except for Odysseus.

=== Other works ===
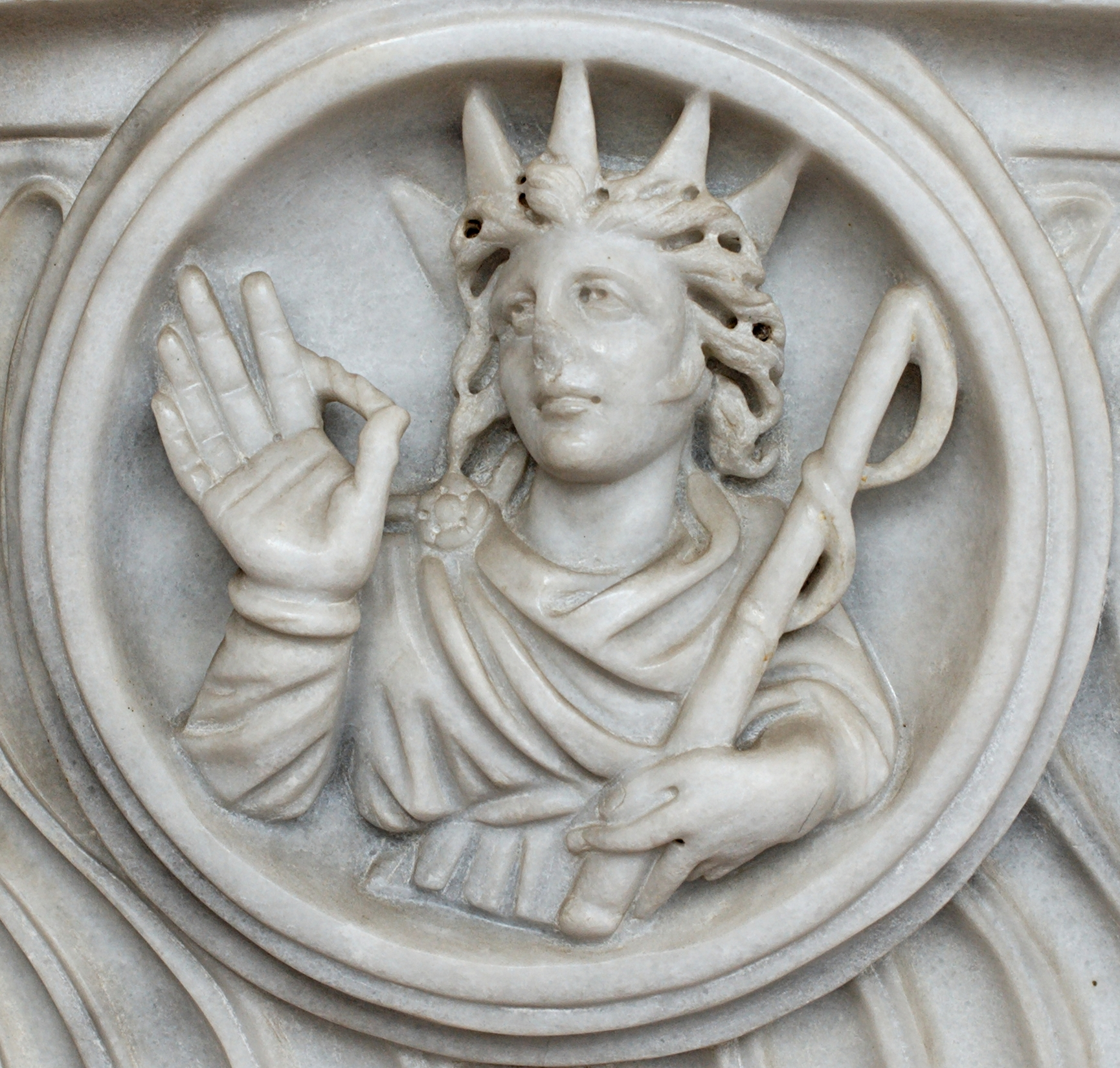
Bust of Helios in a clipeus, detail from a strigillated lenos sarcophagus, white marble, early 3rd century CE, Tomb D in Via Belluzzo, Rome.

Helios is featured in several of Lucian's works beyond his Dialogues of the Gods. In another work of Lucian's, Icaromenippus, Selene complains to the titular character about philosophers wanting to stir up strife between herself and Helios. Later he is seen feasting with the other gods on Olympus, and prompting Menippus to wonder how can night fall on the Heavens while he is there.

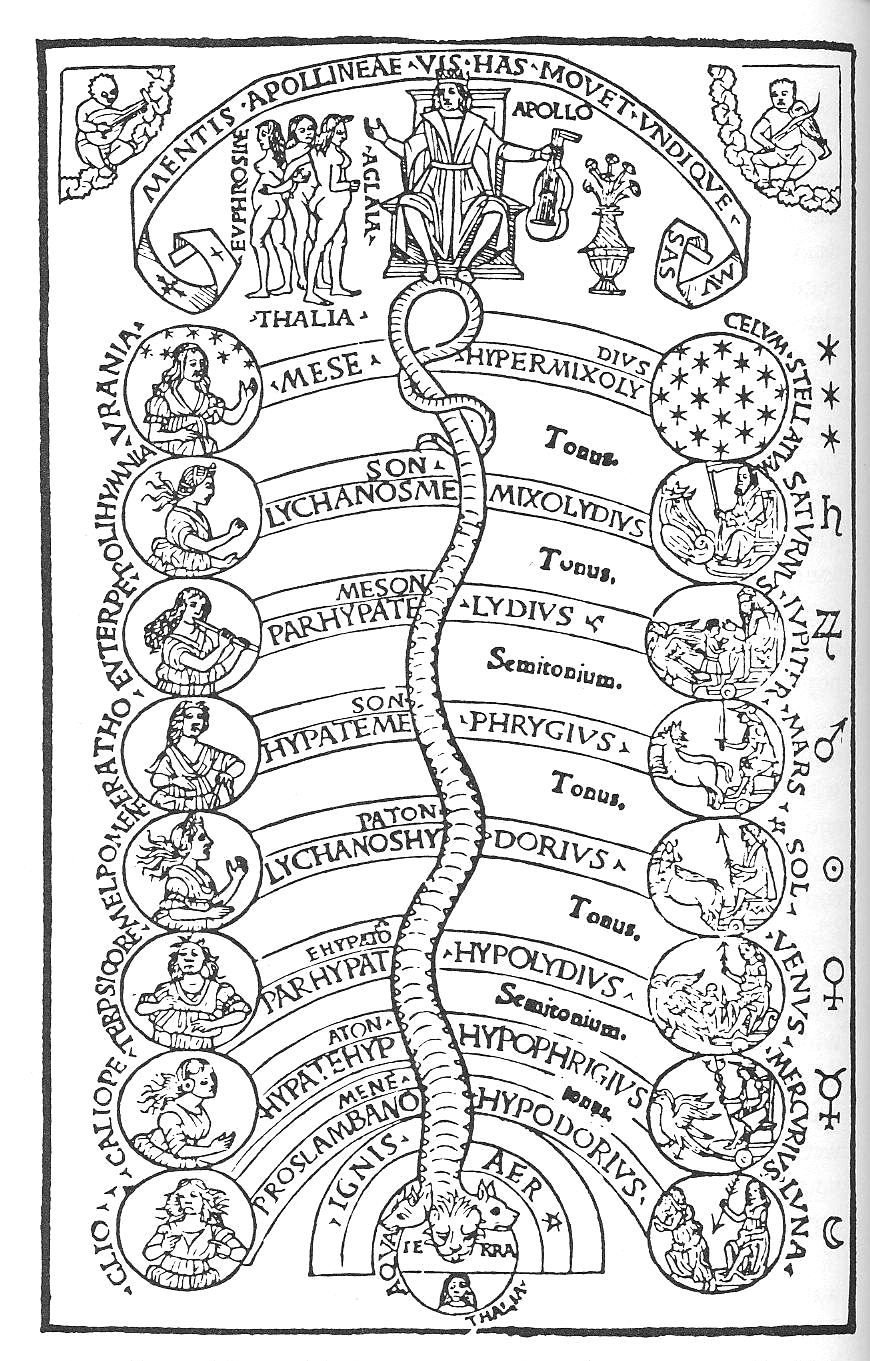
The music of the spheres: the planetary spheres, among others, on an engraving from Renaissance Italy.

Diodorus Siculus recorded an unorthodox version of the myth, in which Basileia, who had succeeded her father Uranus to his royal throne, married her brother Hyperion, and had two children, a son Helios and a daughter Selene. Because Basileia's other brothers envied these offspring, they put Hyperion to the sword and drowned Helios in the river Eridanus, while Selene took her own life. After the massacre, Helios appeared in a dream to his grieving mother and assured her and their murderers would be punished, and that he and his sister would now be transformed into immortal, divine natures; what was known as Mene would now be called Selene, and the "holy fire" in the heavens would bear his own name.

It was said that Selene, when preoccupied with her passion for the mortal Endymion, would give her moon chariot to Helios to drive it.

Claudian wrote that in his infancy, Helios was nursed by his aunt Tethys.

Pausanias writes that the people of Titane held that Titan was a brother of Helios, the first inhabitant of Titane after whom the town was named; Titan however was generally identified as Helios himself, instead of being a separate figure.

According to sixth century BC lyric poet Stesichorus, with Helios in his palace lives his mother Theia.

In the myth of the dragon Python's slaying by Apollo, the slain serpent's corpse is said to have rotten in the strength of the "shining Hyperion".

=== Consorts and children ===
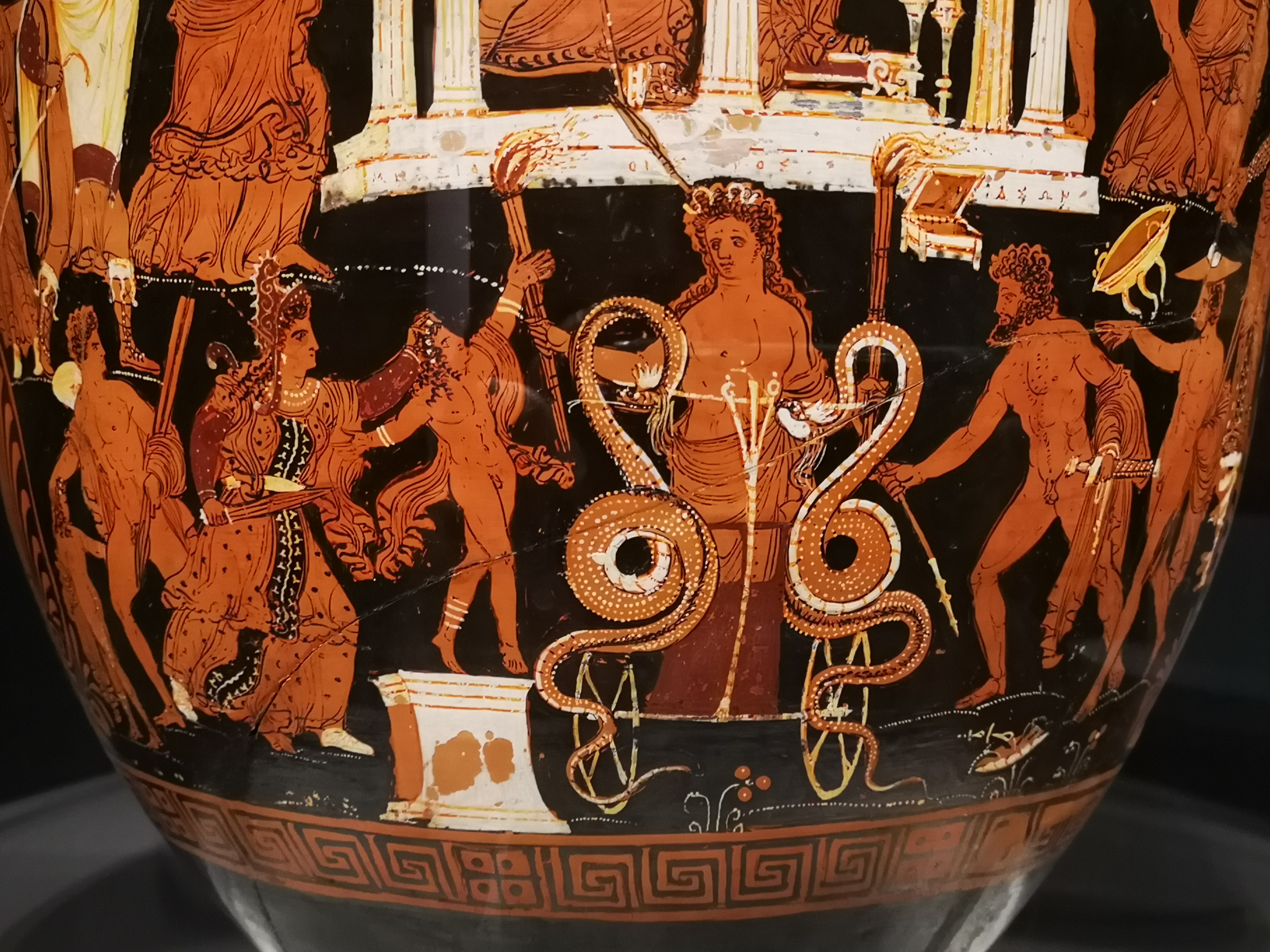
Helios, riding on a snake-drawn chariot, witnesses Medea killing her son on an altar, red-figure krater, detail, attributed to the Underworld Painter, circa 330 - 310 BC, Staatliche Antikensammlung, Munich.

The god Helios is typically depicted as the head of a large family, and the places that venerated him the most would also typically claim both mythological and genealogical descent from him; for example, the Cretans traced the ancestry of their king Idomeneus to Helios through his daughter Pasiphaë.

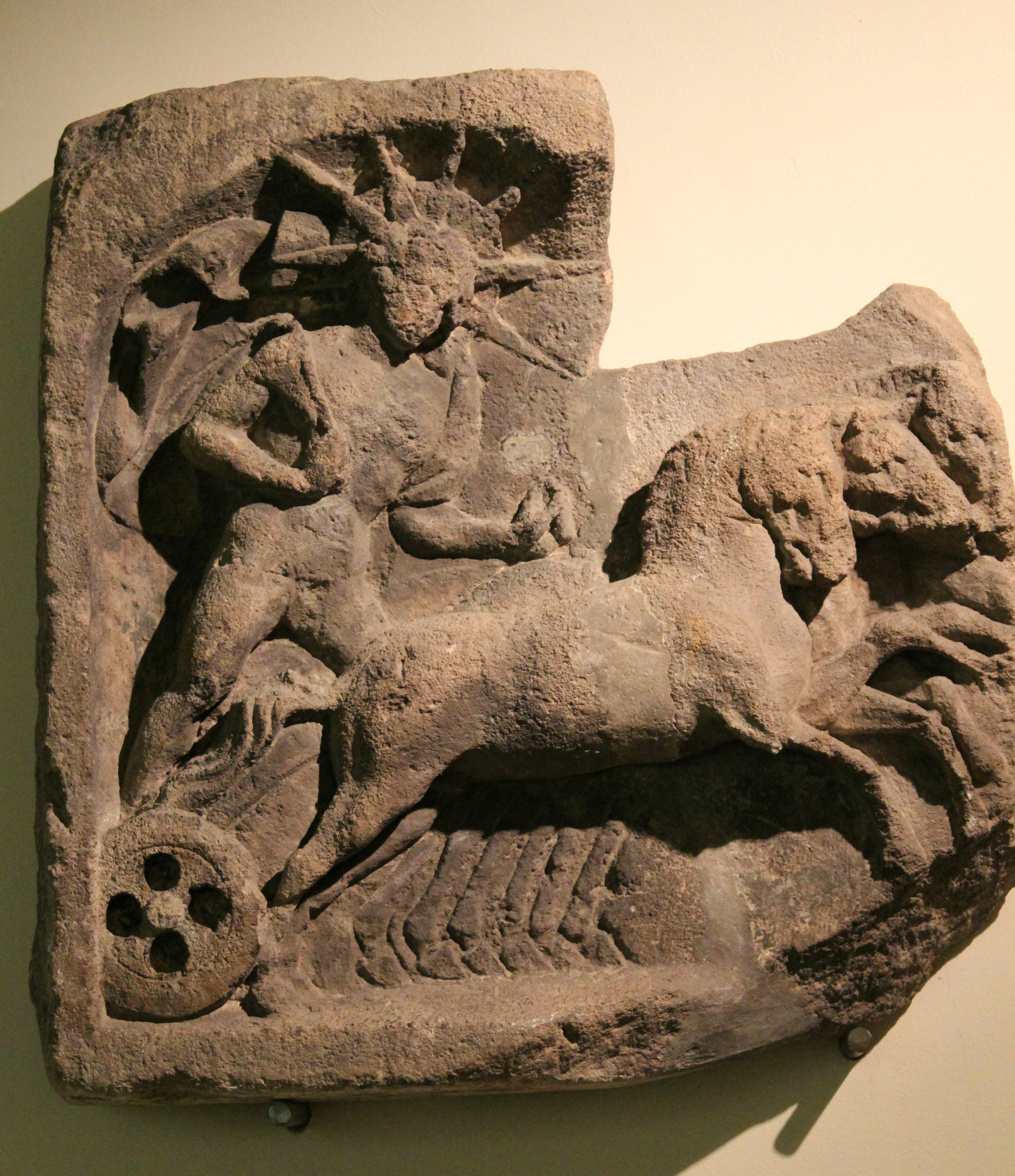
Limestone relief representing the god Helios, driving the celestial quadriga, Royal Museums of Art and History, Brussels, Belgium.

Traditionally the Oceanid nymph Perse was seen as the sun god's wife by whom he had various children, most notably Circe, Aeëtes, Minos's wife Pasiphaë, Perses, and in some versions the Corinthian king Aloeus. Ioannes Tzetzes adds Calypso, otherwise the daughter of Atlas, to the list of children Helios had by Perse, perhaps due to the similarities of the roles and personalities she and Circe display in the Odyssey as hosts of Odysseus.

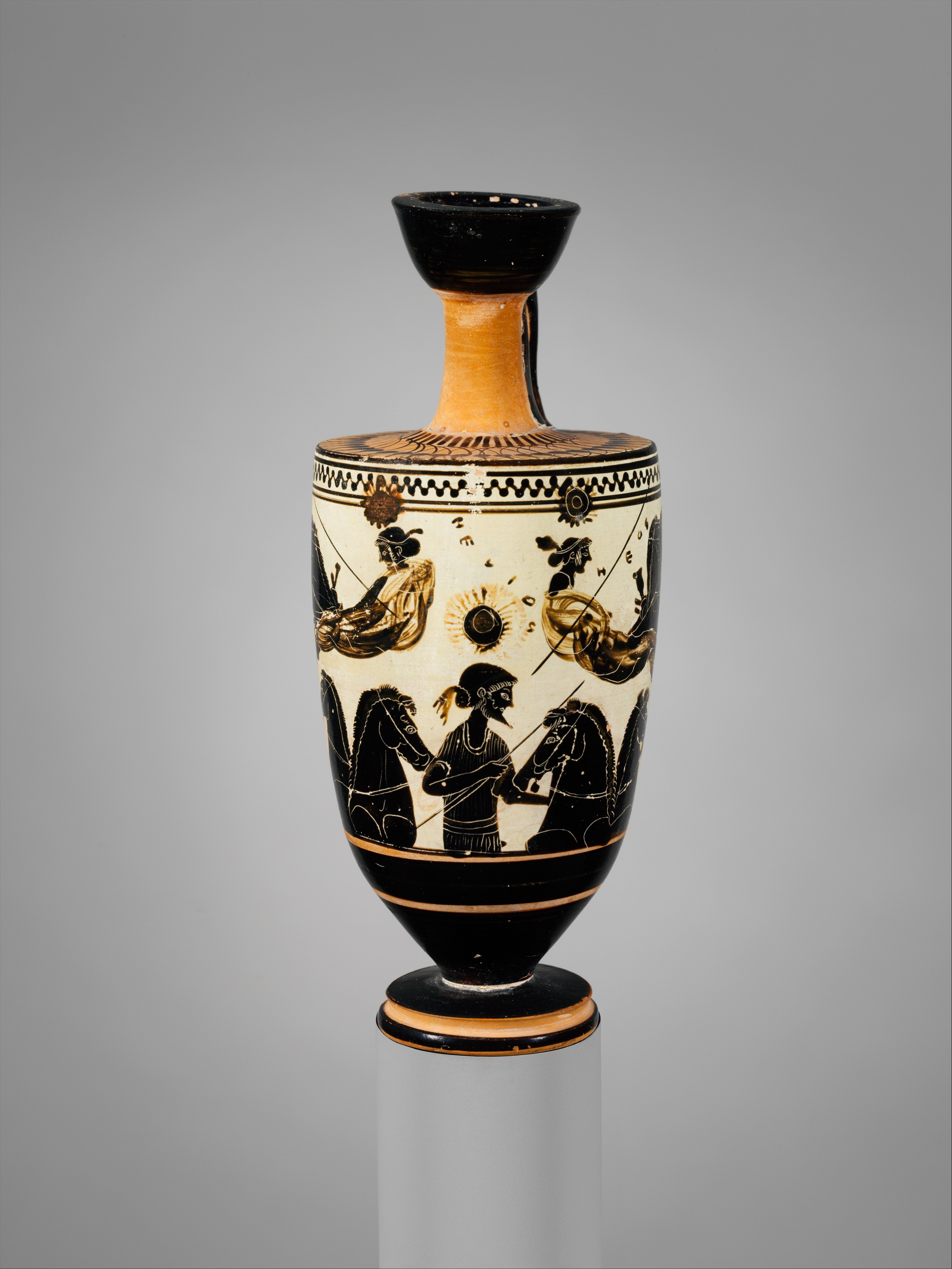
Helios rising in his quadriga; above Nyx driving away to the left and Eos to the right, and Heracles offering sacrifice at altar. Sappho painter, Greek, Attic, black-figure, ca. 500 BC

At some point Helios warned Aeëtes of a prophecy that stated he would suffer treachery from one of his own offspring (which Aeëtes took to mean his daughter Chalciope and her children by Phrixus). Helios also bestowed several gifts on his son, such as a chariot with swift steeds, a golden helmet with four plates, a giant's war armor, and robes and a necklace as a pledge of fatherhood. When his daughter Medea betrays him and flees with Jason after stealing the golden fleece, Aeëtes calls upon his father and Zeus to witness their unlawful actions against him and his people.

As father of Aeëtes, Helios was also the grandfather of Medea and would play a significant role in Euripides's rendition of her fate in Corinth. When Medea offers Princess Glauce the poisoned robes and diadem, she says they were gifts to her from Helios. Later, after Medea has caused the deaths of Glauce and King Creon, as well as her own children, Helios helps her escape Corinth and her husband. In Seneca's rendition of the story, a frustrated Medea criticizes the inaction of her grandfather, wondering why he has not darkened the sky at sight of such wickedness, and asks from him his fiery chariot so she can burn Corinth to the ground.

However, he is also stated to have married other women instead like Rhodos in the Rhodian tradition, by whom he had seven sons, the Heliadae (Ochimus, Cercaphus, Macar, Actis, Tenages, Triopas, Candalus), and the girl Electryone.

In Nonnus's account from the Dionysiaca, Helios and the nymph Clymene met and fell in love with each other in the mythical island of Kerne and got married. Soon Clymene fell pregnant with Phaetheon. Her and Helios raised their child together, until the ill-fated day the boy asked his father for his chariot. A passage from Greek anthology mentions Helios visiting Clymene in her room.

The mortal king of Elis Augeas was said to be Helios's son, but Pausanias states that his actual father was the mortal king Eleios.

In some rare versions, Helios is the father, rather than the brother, of his sisters Selene and Eos. A scholiast on Euripides explained that Selene was said to be his daughter since she partakes of the solar light, and changes her shape based on the position of the sun.

Consort	Children	Consort	Children	Consort	Children
Athena	• The Corybantes	Rhodos (a nymph)	• The Heliadae (Note: Expert seafarers and astrologers from Rhodes island.)	Ephyra (an Oceanid)	• Aeëtes
Aegle, (a Naiad)	• The Charites	Rhodos (a nymph)	1. Tenages	Antiope	• Aeëtes
Aegle, (a Naiad)	1. Aglaea; "splendor"	Rhodos (a nymph)	2. Macareus	Antiope	• Aloeus
Aegle, (a Naiad)	2. Euphrosyne; "mirth"	Rhodos (a nymph)	3. Actis	Gaia	• Tritopatores
Aegle, (a Naiad)	3. Thalia; "flourishing"	Rhodos (a nymph)	4. Triopas	Gaia	• Bisaltes
Clymene (an Oceanid)	• The Heliades	Rhodos (a nymph)	5. Candalus	Gaia	• Achelous
Clymene (an Oceanid)	1. Aetheria	Rhodos (a nymph)	6. Ochimus	Hyrmine or	• Augeas
Clymene (an Oceanid)	2. Helia	Rhodos (a nymph)	7. Cercaphus	Iphiboe or	• Augeas
Clymene (an Oceanid)	3. Merope	Rhodos (a nymph)	8. Auges	Nausidame	• Augeas
Clymene (an Oceanid)	4. Phoebe	Rhodos (a nymph)	9. Thrinax	Demeter or	• Acheron
Clymene (an Oceanid)	5. Dioxippe	Rhodos (a nymph)	• Electryone	Gaia	• Acheron
Clymene (an Oceanid)	• Phaethon	Perse (an Oceanid)	• Calypso	unknown woman	• Aethon
Clymene (an Oceanid)	• Astris	Perse (an Oceanid)	• Aeëtes	unknown woman	• Aix
Clymene (an Oceanid)	• Lampetia	Perse (an Oceanid)	• Perses	unknown woman	• Aloeus
Rhode (a Naiad)	• Phaethon	Perse (an Oceanid)	• Circe	unknown woman	• Camirus
Prote (a Nereid)	• Phaethon	Perse (an Oceanid)	• Pasiphaë	unknown woman	• Ichnaea
Prote (a Nereid)	• The Heliades	Perse (an Oceanid)	• Aloeus	unknown woman	• Mausolus
Neaera (perhaps an Oceanid)	• Phaethusa	Asterope	• Aeëtes	unknown woman	• Phorbas
Neaera (perhaps an Oceanid)	• Lampetia	Asterope	• Circe	unknown woman	• Sterope
Ocyrrhoe (an Oceanid)	• Phasis	Ceto (an Oceanid)	• Astris	unknown woman	• Eos
Leda	• Helen	Leucothoe or	• Thersanon	unknown woman	• Selene
Clytie (an Oceanid)	• No known offspring	Leucothea	• Thersanon	unknown woman	• Hemera
Selene	• The Horae (possibly)	Crete	• Pasiphaë	unknown woman	• Dirce
unknown woman	• Aeëtes	unknown woman	• Clymenus	unknown woman	• Lelex
unknown woman	• Perses	unknown woman	• Chrysus		
unknown woman	• Cos	unknown woman	• Cronus (Orphic)		

- Anaxibia, an Indian Naiad, was lusted after by Helios according to Pseudo-Plutarch.

== Worship ==
=== Cult ===
==== Archaic and Classical Athens ====
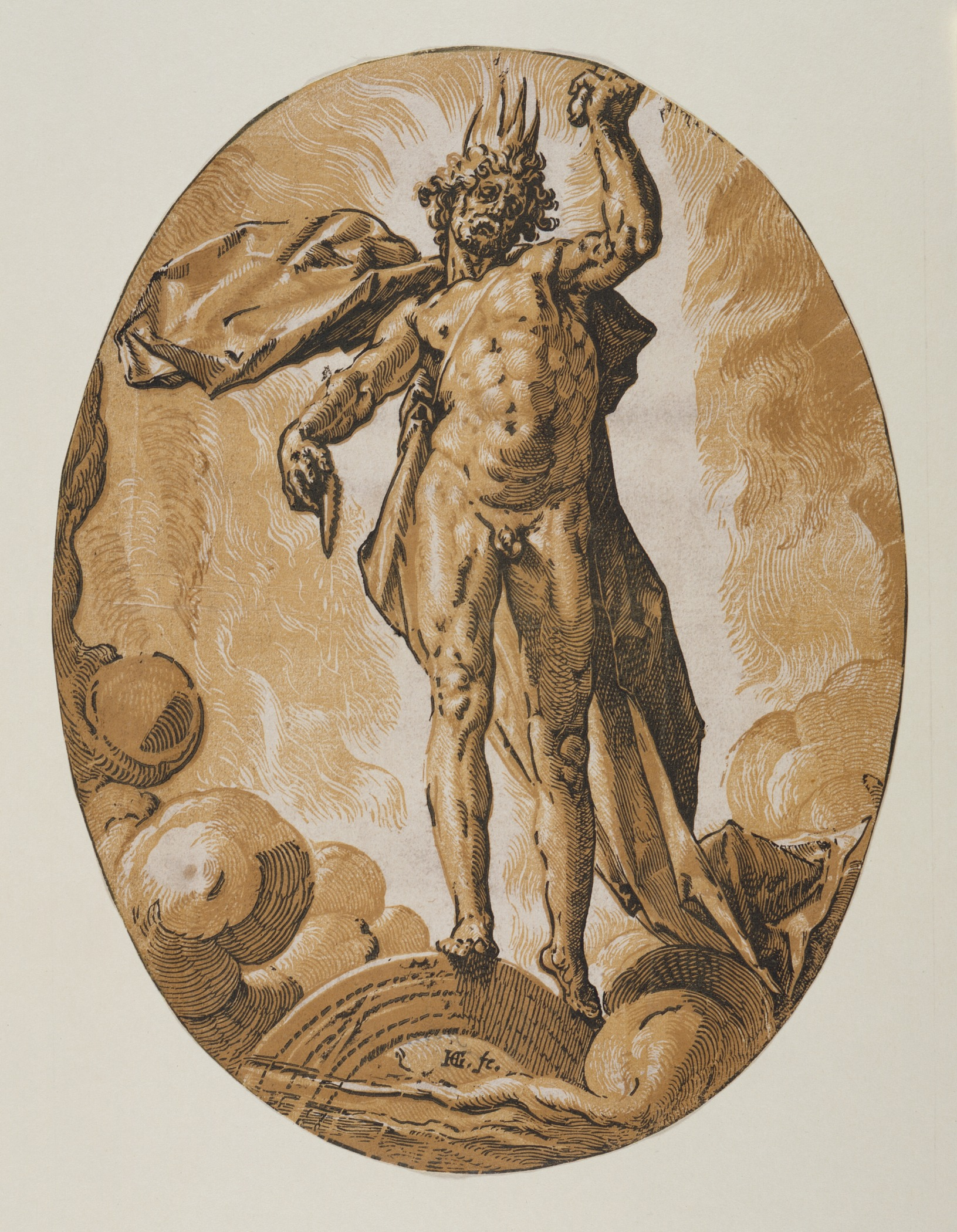
Helios the Sun, by Hendrik Goltzius (Holland, Mülbracht [now Bracht-am-Niederrhein], 1558-1617

Scholarly focus on the ancient Greek cults of Helios has generally been rather slim, partially due to how scarce both literary and archaeological sources are. L.R. Farnell assumed "that sun-worship had once been prevalent and powerful among the people of the pre-Hellenic culture, but that very few of the communities of the later historic period retained it as a potent factor of the state religion". The largely Attic literary sources used by scholars present ancient Greek religion with an Athenian bias, and, according to J. Burnet, "no Athenian could be expected to worship Helios or Selene, but he might think them to be gods, since Helios was the great god of Rhodes and Selene was worshiped at Elis and elsewhere".Aristophanes's Peace (406–413) contrasts the worship of Helios and Selene with that of the more essentially Greek Twelve Olympians.

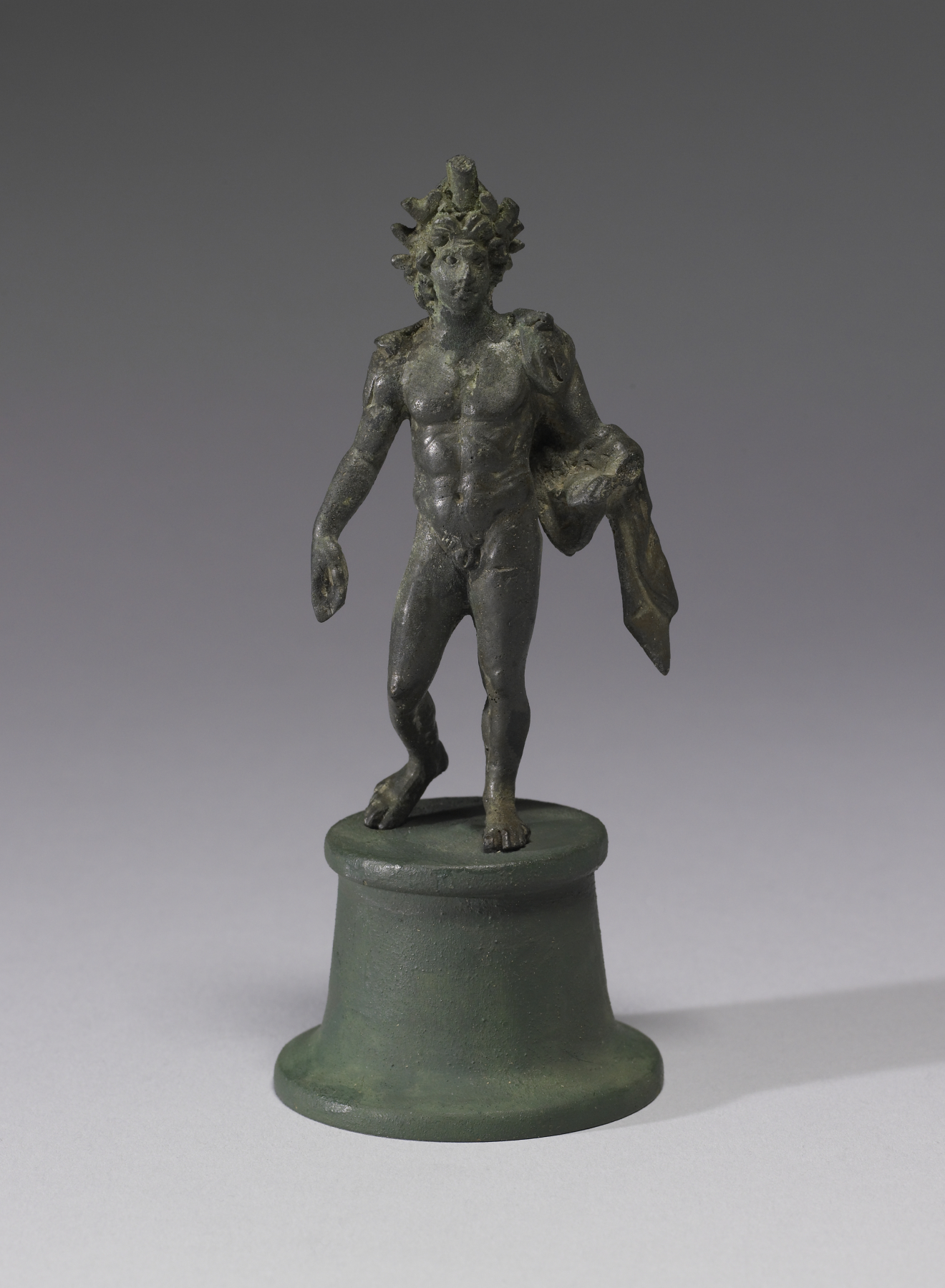
Alexander the Great as Helios, Roman, cast bronze, 1st century, Walters Art Museum.

The tension between the mainstream traditional religious veneration of Helios, which had become enriched with ethical values, poetical symbolism, and the Ionian proto-scientific examination of the Sun, clashed in the trial of Anaxagoras c. 450 BC, in which Anaxagoras asserted that the Sun was in fact a gigantic red-hot ball of metal.

==== Hellenistic period ====
Helios was not worshipped in Athens until the Hellenistic period, in post-classical times. His worship might be described as a product of the Hellenistic era, influenced perhaps by the general spread of cosmic and astral beliefs during the reign of Alexander III. A scholiast on Sophocles wrote that the Athenians did not offer wine as an offering to Helios among other gods, making instead nephalia, or wineless, sober sacrifices; Athenaeus also reported that those who sacrificed to him did not offer wine, but brought honey instead, to the altars reasoning that the god who held the cosmos in order should not succumb to drunkenness.

Lysimachides in the first century BC or first century AD reported of a festival Skira:

that the skiron is a large sunshade under which the priestess of Athena, the priest of Poseidon, and the priest of Helios walk as it is carried from the acropolis to a place called Skiron.

During the Thargelia, a festival in honour of Apollo, the Athenians had cereal offerings for Helios and the Horae. They were honoured with a procession, due to their clear connections and relevance to agriculture. Helios and the Horae were also apparently worshipped during another Athenian festival held in honor of Apollo, the Pyanopsia, with a feast; an attested procession, independent from the one recorded at the Thargelia, might have been in their honour.

Side B of LSCG 21.B19 from the Piraeus Asclepium prescribe cake offerings to several gods, among them Helios and Mnemosyne, two gods linked to incubation through dreams, who are offered a type of honey cake called arester and a honeycomb. The cake was put on fire during the offering. A type of cake called orthostates made of wheaten and barley flour was offered to him and the Hours. Phthois, another flat cake made with cheese, honey and wheat was also offered to him among many other gods.

In many places people kept herds of red and white cattle in his honour, and white animals of several kinds, but especially white horses, were considered to be sacred to him. Ovid writes that horses were sacrificed to him because no slow animal should be offered to the swift god.

In Plato's Republic Helios, the Sun, is the symbolic offspring of the idea of the Good.

The ancient Greeks called Sunday "day of the Sun" (ἡμέρα Ἡλίου) after him. According to Philochorus, Athenian historian and Atthidographer of the 3rd century BC, the first day of each month was sacred to Helios.

==== Rhodes ====
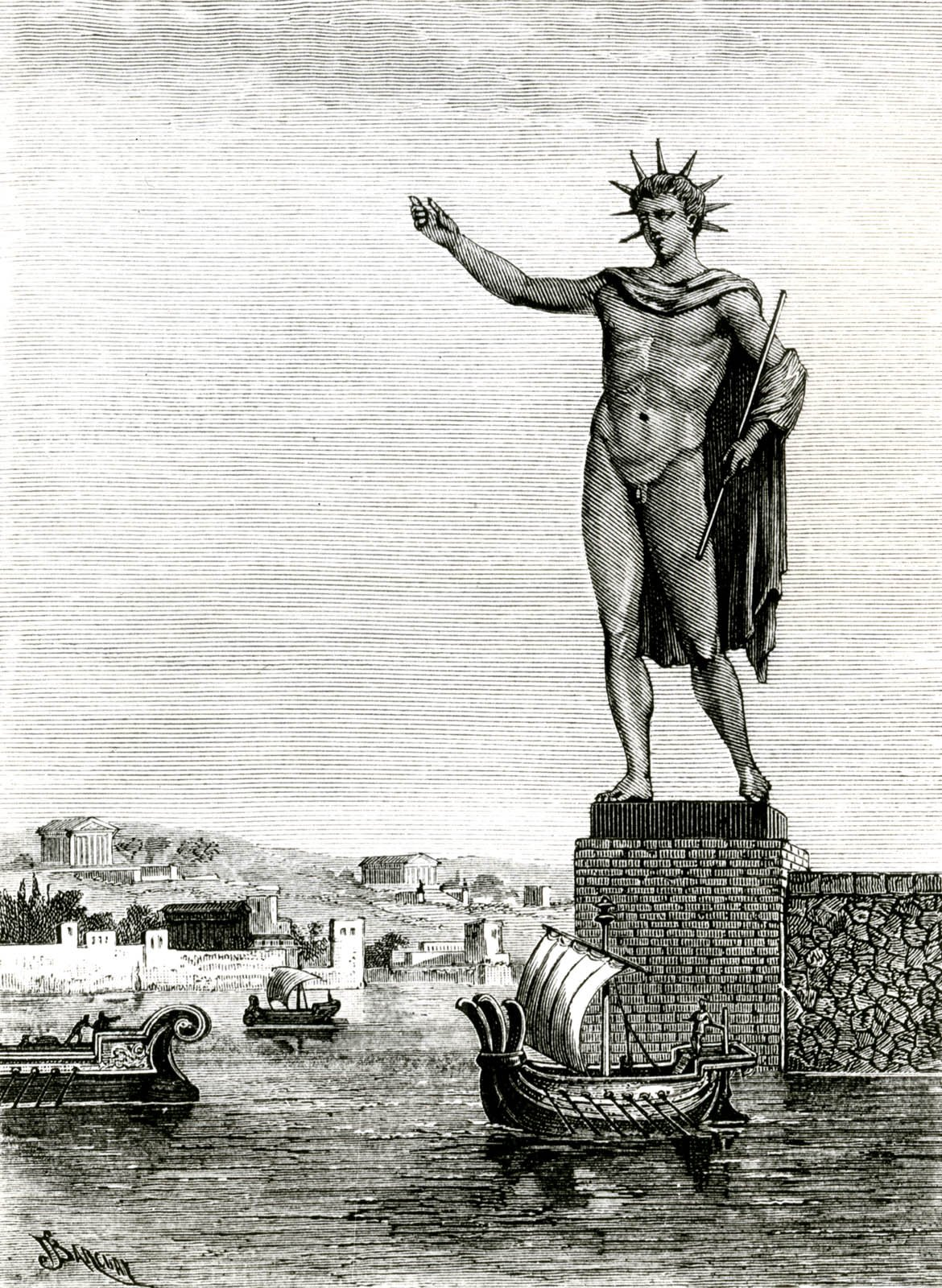
Colossus of Rhodes

The island of Rhodes was an important cult center for Helios, one of the only places where he was worshipped as a major deity in ancient Greece. One of Pindar's most notable greatest odes is an abiding memorial of the devotion of the island of Rhodes to the cult and personality of Helios, and all evidence points that he was for the Rhodians what Olympian Zeus was for Elis or Athena for the Athenians; their local myths, especially those concerning the Heliadae, suggest that Helios in Rhodes was revered as the founder of their race and their civilization.

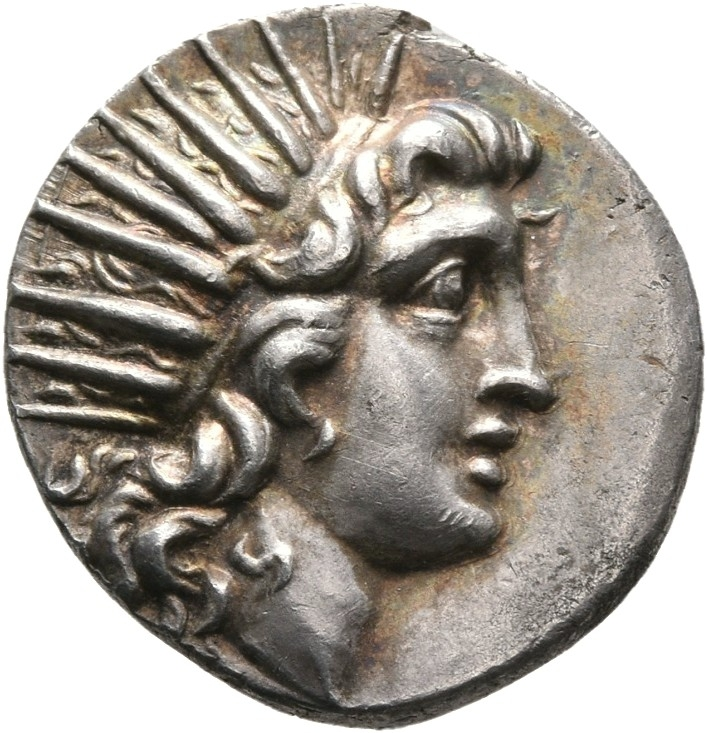
Silver drachma coin from Rhodes island with the head of Helios looking to the right and bearing a diadem of rays, ca. 170-150 BC, University of Tübingen, Berlin.

The worship of Helios at Rhodes included a ritual in which a quadriga, or chariot drawn by four horses, was driven over a precipice into the sea, in reenactment to the myth of Phaethon. Annual gymnastic tournaments were held in Helios's honor; according to Festus (s. v. October Equus) during the Halia each year the Rhodians would also throw quadrigas dedicated to him into the sea. Horse sacrifice was offered to him in many places, but only in Rhodes in teams of four; a team of four horses was also sacrificed to Poseidon in Illyricum, and the sea god was also worshipped in Lindos under the epithet Hippios, denoting perhaps a blending of the cults.

It was believed that if one sacrificed to the rising Sun with their day's work ahead of them, it would be proper to offer a fresh, bright white horse.

The Colossus of Rhodes was dedicated to him. In Xenophon of Ephesus's work of fiction, Ephesian Tale of Anthia and Habrocomes, the protagonist Anthia cuts and dedicates some of her hair to Helios during his festival at Rhodes. The Rhodians called shrine of Helios, Haleion (Ancient Greek: Ἄλειον).

A colossal statue of the god, known as the Colossus of Rhodes and named as one of the Seven Wonders of the Ancient World, was erected in his honour and adorned the port of the city of Rhodes.

The best of these are, first, the Colossus of Helius, of which the author of the iambic verse says, "seven times ten cubits in height, the work of Chares the Lindian"; but it now lies on the ground, having been thrown down by an earthquake and broken at the knees. In accordance with a certain oracle, the people did not raise it again.

According to most contemporary descriptions, the Colossus stood approximately 70 cubits, or 33 metres (108 feet) high – approximately the height of the modern Statue of Liberty from feet to crown – making it the tallest statue in the ancient world. It collapsed after an earthquake that hit Rhodes in 226 BC, and the Rhodians did not build it again, in accordance with an oracle.

In Rhodes, Helios seems to have absorbed the worship and cult of the island's local hero and mythical founder Tlepolemus. In ancient Greek city foundation, the use of the archegetes in its double sense of both founder and progenitor of a political order, or a polis, can be seen with Rhodes; real prominence was transferred from the local hero Tlepolemus, onto the god, Helios, with an appropriate myth explaining his relative insignificance; thus games originally celebrated for Tlepolemus were now given to Helios, who was seen as both ancestor and founder of the polis. A sanctuary of Helios and the nymphs stood in Loryma near Lindos.

The priesthood of Helios was, at some point, appointed by lot, though in the great city a man and his two sons held the office of priesthood for the sun god in succession.

==== Peloponnese ====
The scattering of cults in Sicyon, Argos, Hermione, Epidaurus and Laconia seem to suggest that Helios was considerably important in Dorian religion, compared to other parts of ancient Greece. It may have been the Dorians who brought his worship to Rhodes.

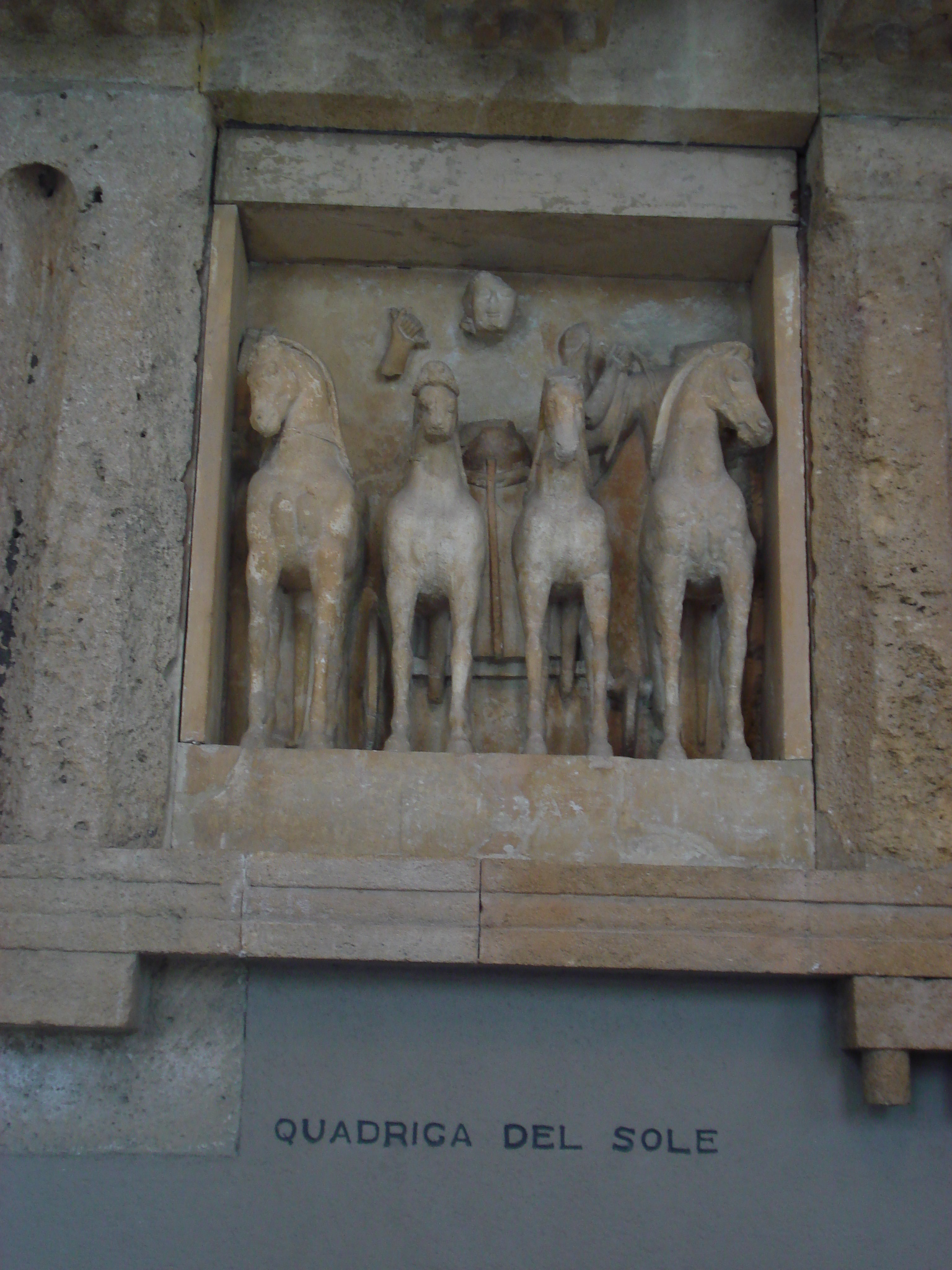
Quadriga of the Sun, sixth century BC, Temple C, Selinunte.

Helios was an important god in Corinth and the greater Corinthia region. Pausanias in his Description of Greece describes how Helios and Poseidon vied over the city, with Poseidon getting the isthmus of Corinth and Helios being awarded with the Acrocorinth. Helios's prominence in Corinth might go as back as Mycenaean times, and predate Poseidon's arrival, or it might be due to Oriental immigration. At Sicyon, Helios had an altar behind Hera's sanctuary. It would seem that for the Corinthians, Helios was notable enough to even have control over thunder, which is otherwise the domain of the sky god Zeus.

Helios had a cult in Laconia as well. Taletos, a peak of Mt. Taygetus, was sacred to Helios. At Thalamae, Helios together with his daughter Pasiphaë were revered in an oracle, where the goddess revealed to the people consulting her what they needed to know in their dreams. While the predominance of Helios in Sparta is currently unclear, it seems Helen was the local solar deity. Helios (and Selene's) worship in Gytheum, near Sparta, is attested by an inscription (C.I.G. 1392).

In Argolis, an altar was dedicated to Helios near Mycenae, and another in Troezen, where he was worshipped as the God of Freedom, seeing how the Troezenians had escaped slavery at the hands of Xerxes I. Over at Hermione stood a temple of his. He appears to have also been venerated in Epidaurus.

In Arcadia, he had a cult in Megalopolis as the Saviour, and an altar near Mantineia.

==== Elsewhere ====
Traces of Helios's worship can also be found in Crete. In the earliest period Rhodes stood in close relations with Crete, and it is relatively safe to suggest that the name "Taletos" is associated with the Eteocretan word for the Sun "Talos", surviving in Zeus's epithet Tallaios, a solar aspect of the thunder god in Crete. Helios was also invoked in an oath of alliance between Knossos and Dreros.

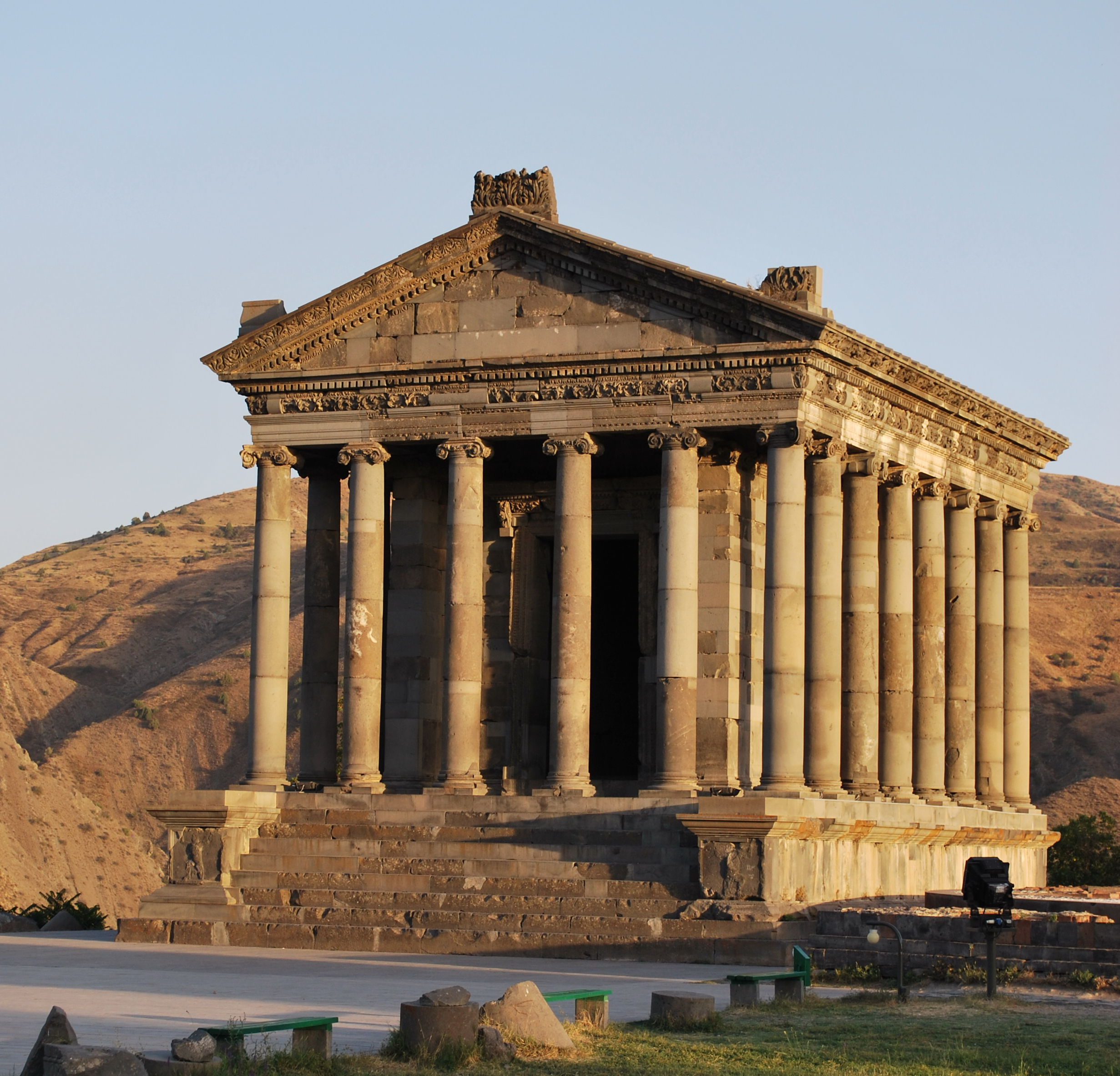
The Temple of Garni, late first century, Armenia, dedicated to the solar god Helios-Mihr, from a syncretic Helleno-Armenian cult.

In his little-attested cults in Asia Minor it seems his identification with Apollo was the strongest. It is possible that the solar elements of Apollo's Anatolian cults were influenced by Helios's cult in Rhodes, as Rhodes lies right off the southwest coast of Asia Minor.

Archaeological evidence has proven the existence of a shrine to Helios and Hemera, the goddess of the day and daylight, at the island of Kos and excavations have revealed traces of his cult at Sinope, Pozzuoli, Ostia and elsewhere. After a plague hit the city of Cleonae, in Phocis, Central Greece, the people there sacrificed a he-goat to Helios, and were reportedly then spared from the plague.

Helios also had a cult in the region of Thessaly. Plato in his Laws mentions the state of the Magnetes making a joint offering to Helios and Apollo, indicating a close relationship between the cults of those two gods, but it is clear that they were nevertheless distinct deities in Thessaly.

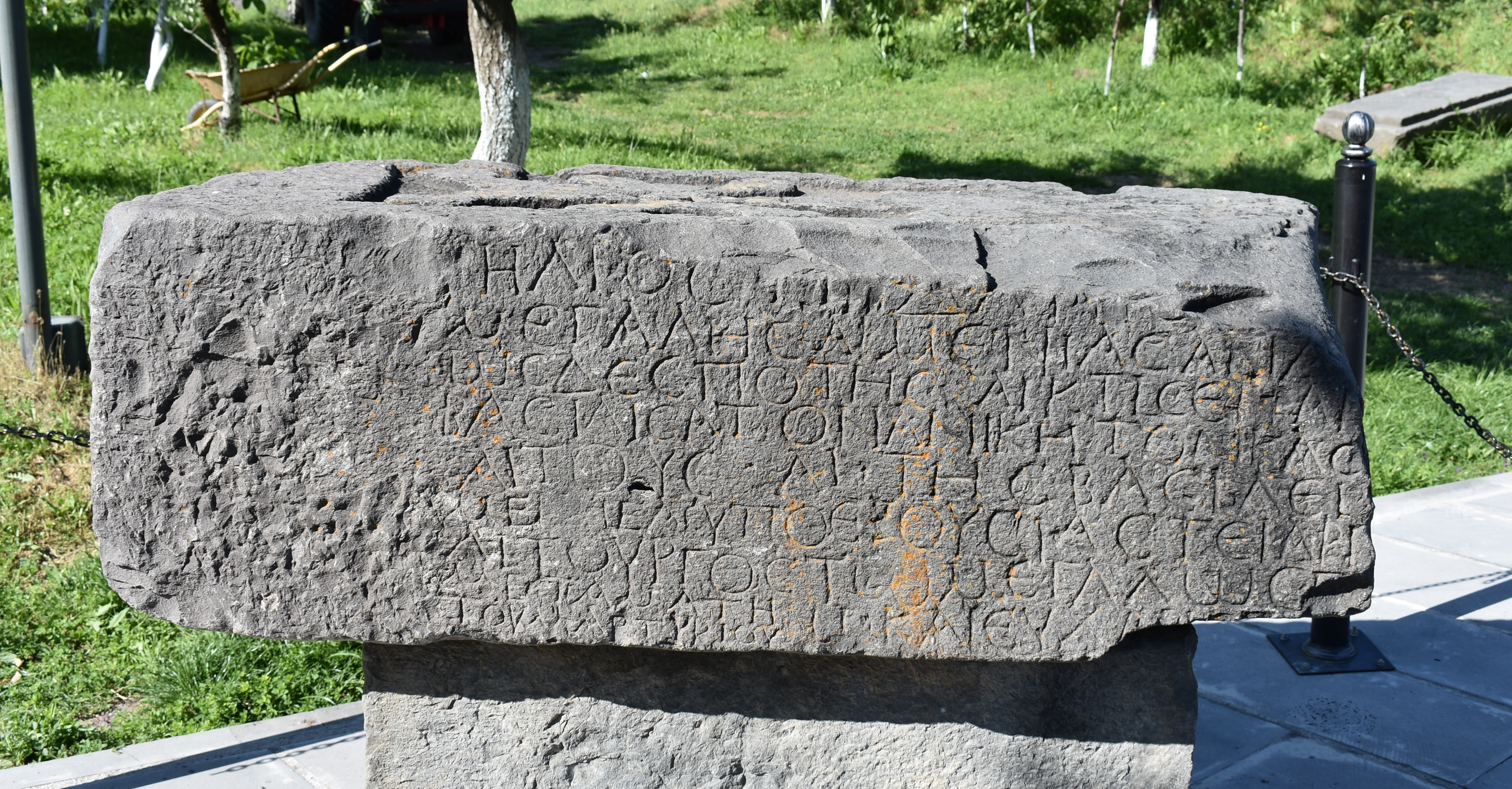
An ancient Greek inscription naming King Tiridates the Sun (Helios Tiridates) as the founder of the Garni temple.

Helios is also depicted on first century BC coins found at Halicarnassus, Syracuse in Sicily and at Zacynthus. From Pergamon originates a hymn to Helios in the style of Euripides.

In Apollonia he was also venerated, as evidenced from Herodotus's account where a man named Evenius was harshly punished by his fellow citizens for allowing wolves to devour the flock of sheep sacred to the god out of negligence.

The Alexander Romance names a temple of Helios in the city of Alexandria.

=== Other functions ===
==== In oath-keeping ====
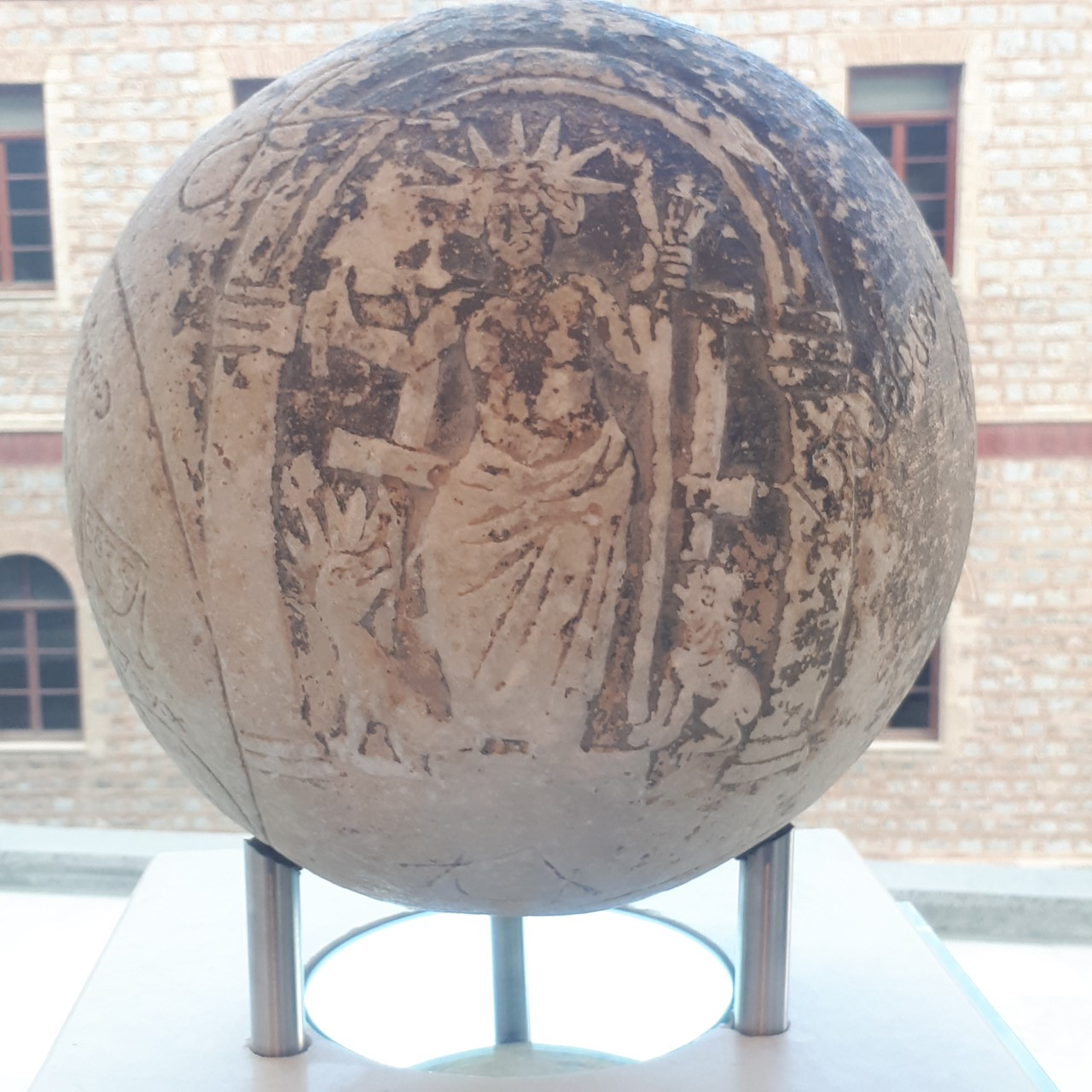
Magical sphere with Helios and magical symbols from the theatre of Dionysus, Acropolis Museum, Athens.

Gods were often called upon by the Greeks when an oath was sworn; Helios is among the three deities to be invoked in the Iliad to witness the truce between Greeks and Trojans. He is also often appealed to in ancient drama to witness the unfolding events or take action, such as in Oedipus Rex and Medea. The notion of Helios as witness to oaths and vows also led to a view of Helios as a witness of wrong-doings. He was thus seen as a guarantor of cosmic order.

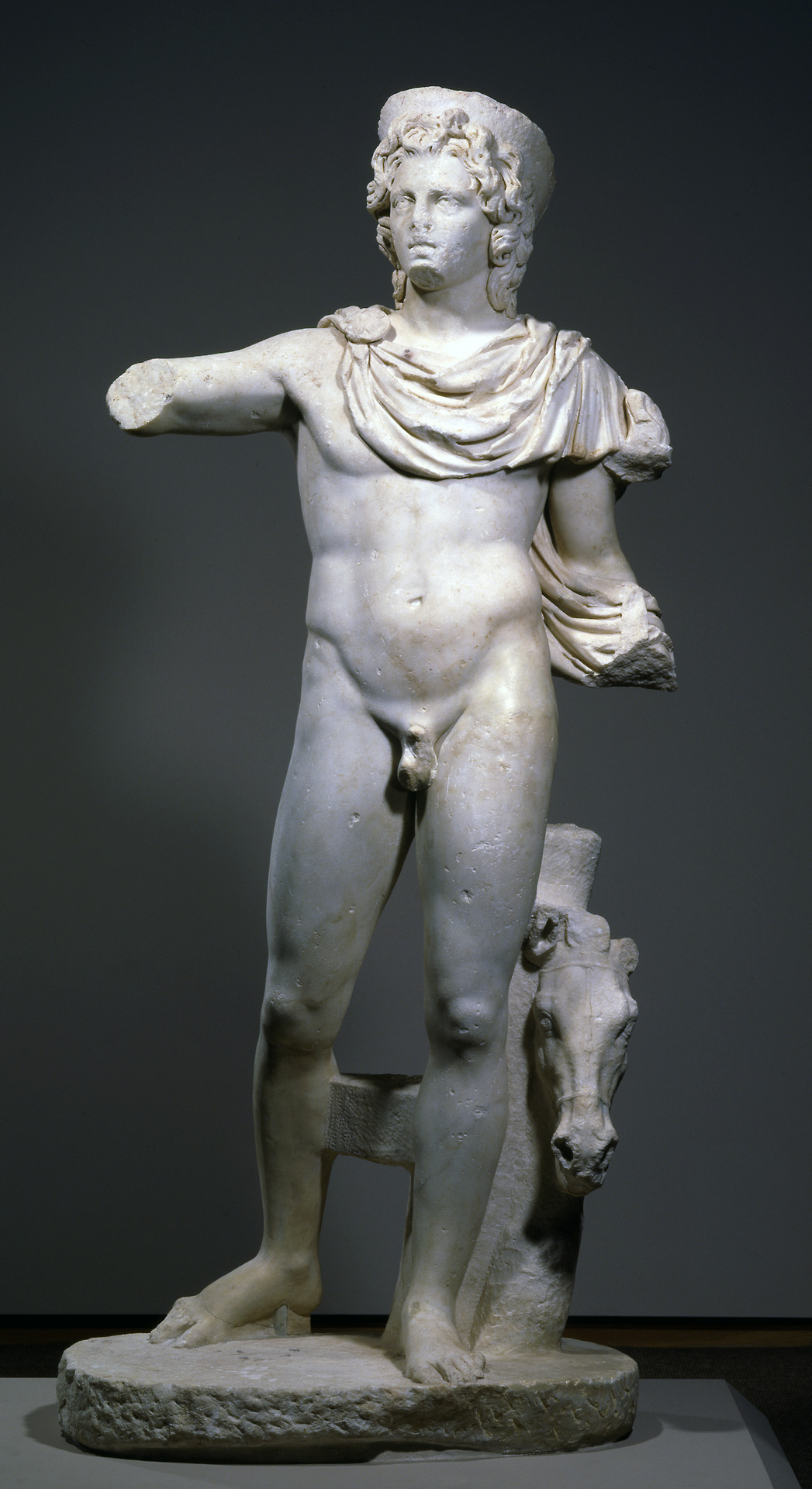
Statue of Helios with features of Caracalla and Alexander, marble, Roman, ca. 2nd-3rd century AD, North Carolina Museum of Art.

Helios was invoked as a witness to several alliances such as the one between Athens and Cetriporis, Lyppeus of Paeonia and Grabus, and the oaths of the League of Corinth. In a treaty between the cities of Smyrna and Magnesia, the Magnesians swore their oath by Helios among others. The combination of Zeus, Gaia and Helios in oath-swearing is also found among the non-Greek 'Royal Gods' in an agreement between Maussollus and Phaselis (360s BC) and in the Hellenistic period with the degree of Chremonides's announcing the alliance of Athens and Sparta.

==== In magic ====
He also had a role in necromancy magic. The Greek Magical Papyri contain several recipes for such, for example one which involves invoking the Sun over the skull-cup of a man who suffered a violent death; after the described ritual, Helios will then send the man's ghost to the practitioner to tell them everything they wish to know. Helios is also associated with Hecate in cursing magic. In some parts of Asia Minor Helios was adjured not to permit any violation of the grave in tomb inscriptions and to warn potential violators not to desecrate the tomb, like one example from Elaeussa-Sebaste in Cilicia:

We adjure you by the heavenly god [Zeus] and Helios and Selene and the gods of the underworld, who receive us, that no one [. . .] will throw another corpse upon our bones.

Helios was also often invoked in funeral imprecations. Helios might have been chosen for this sort of magic because as an all-seeing god he could see everything on earth, even hidden crimes, and thus he was a very popular god to invoke in prayers for vengeance. Additionally, in ancient magic evil-averting aid and apotropaic defense were credited to Helios. Some magic rituals were associated with the engraving of images and stones, as with one such spell which asks Helios to consecrate the stone and fill with luck, honour, success and strength, thus giving the user incredible power.

Helios was also associated with love magic, much like Aphrodite, as there seems to have been another but rather poorly documented tradition of people asking him for help in such love matters, including homosexual love and magical recipes invoking him for affection spells.

==== In dreams ====
It has been suggested that in Ancient Greece people would reveal their dreams to Helios and the sky or the air in order to avert any evil foretold or presaged in them.

According to Artemidorus's Oneirocritica, the rich dreaming of transforming into a god was an auspicious sign, as long as the transformation had no deficiencies, citing the example of a man who dreamt he was Helios but wore a sun crown of just eleven rays. He wrote that the sun god was also an auspicious sign for the poor. In dreams, Helios could either appear in 'sensible' form (the orb of the sun) or his 'intelligible' form (the humanoid god).

=== Late antiquity ===
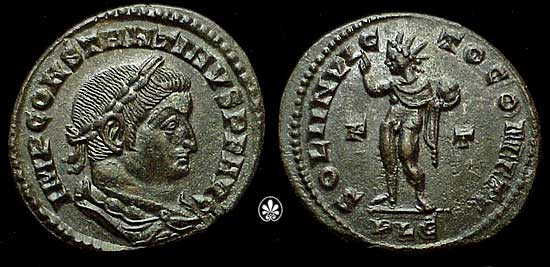
Coin of Roman Emperor Constantine I depicting Sol with the legend SOLI INVICTO COMITI, c. 315 AD.

By Late Antiquity, Helios had accumulated a number of religious, mythological, and literary elements from other deities, particularly Apollo and the Roman sun god Sol. In 274 AD, on December 25, the Roman Emperor Aurelian instituted an official state cult to Sol Invictus (or Helios Megistos, "Great Helios"). This new cult drew together imagery not only associated with Helios and Sol, but also a number of syncretic elements from other deities formerly recognized as distinct. Helios in these works is frequently equated not only with deities such as Mithras and Harpocrates, but even with the monotheistic Judaeo-Christian god.

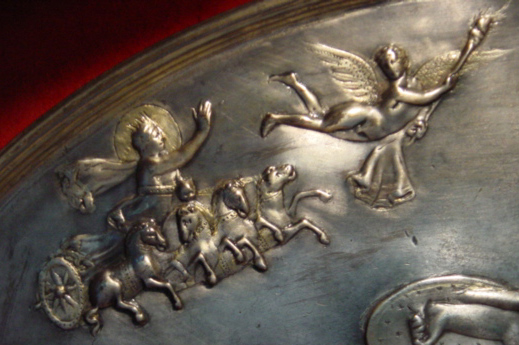
Horse-drawn quadriga of Sol on the Parabiago plate (ca. 2nd–5th centuries AD)

The last pagan emperor of Rome, Julian, made Helios the primary deity of his revived pagan religion, which combined elements of Mithraism with Neoplatonism. For Julian, Helios was a triunity: The One; Helios-Mithras; and the Sun. Because the primary location of Helios in this scheme was the "middle" realm, Julian considered him to be a mediator and unifier not just of the three realms of being, but of all things. Julian's theological conception of Helios has been described as "practically monotheistic", in contrast to earlier Neoplatonists like Iamblichus.

A mosaic found in the Vatican Necropolis (mausoleum M) depicts a figure very similar in style to Sol / Helios, crowned with solar rays and driving a solar chariot. Some scholars have interpreted this as a depiction of Christ, noting that Clement of Alexandria wrote of Christ driving his chariot across the sky. Some scholars doubt the Christian associations, or suggest that the figure is merely a non-religious representation of the Sun.

=== In the Greek Magical Papyri ===
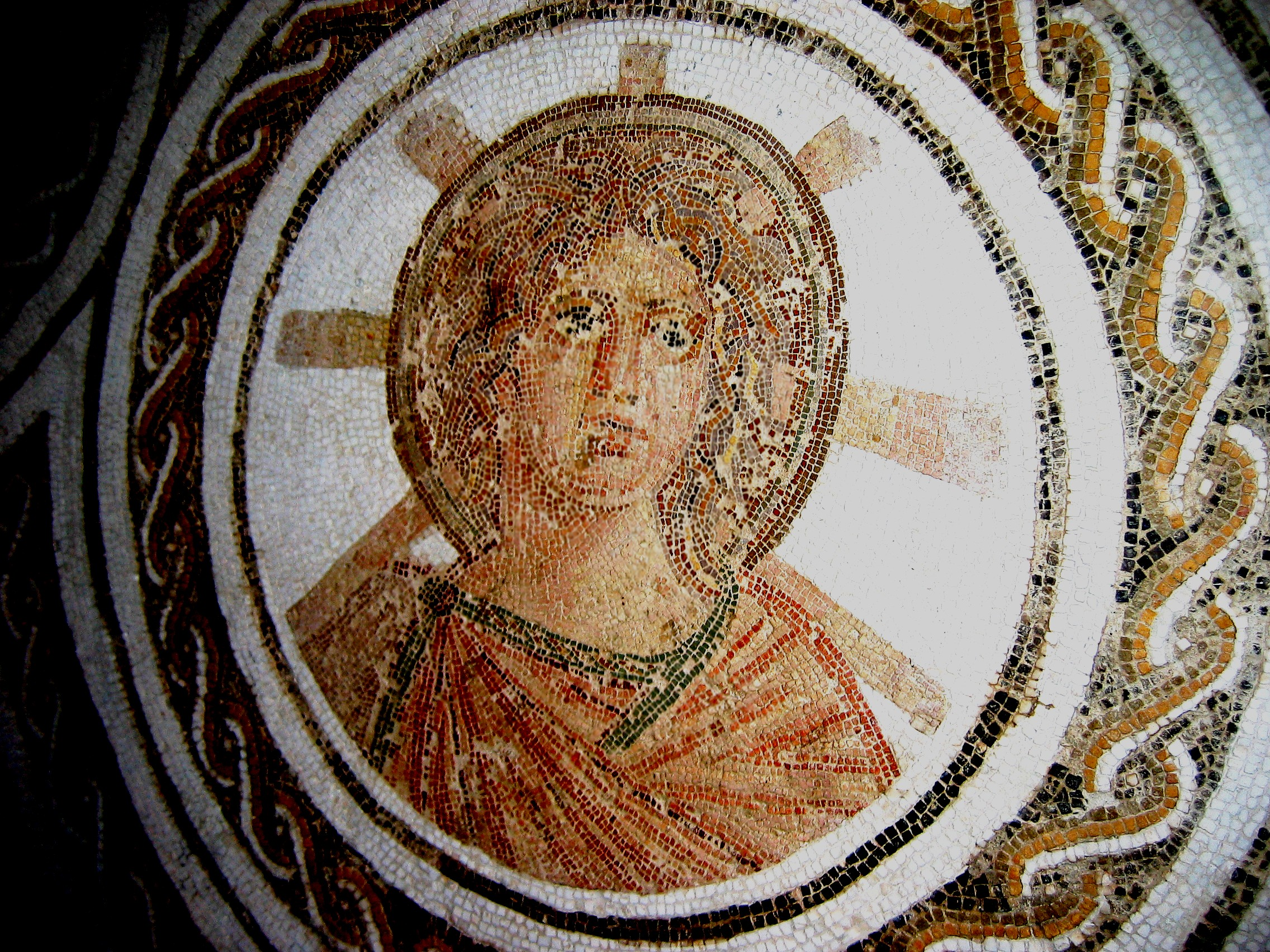
Solar Apollo with the radiant halo of Helios in a Roman floor mosaic, El Djem, Tunisia, late 2nd century

Helios figured prominently in the Greek Magical Papyri. In these mostly fragmentary texts, Helios is credited with a broad domain, being regarded as the creator of life, the lord of the heavens and the cosmos, and the god of the sea. He is said to take the form of 12 animals representing each hour of the day, a motif also connected with the 12 signs of the zodiac.

The Papyri often syncretize Helios with a variety of related deities. He is described as "seated on a lotus, decorated with rays", in the manner of Harpocrates, who was often depicted seated on a lotus flower, representing the rising sun.

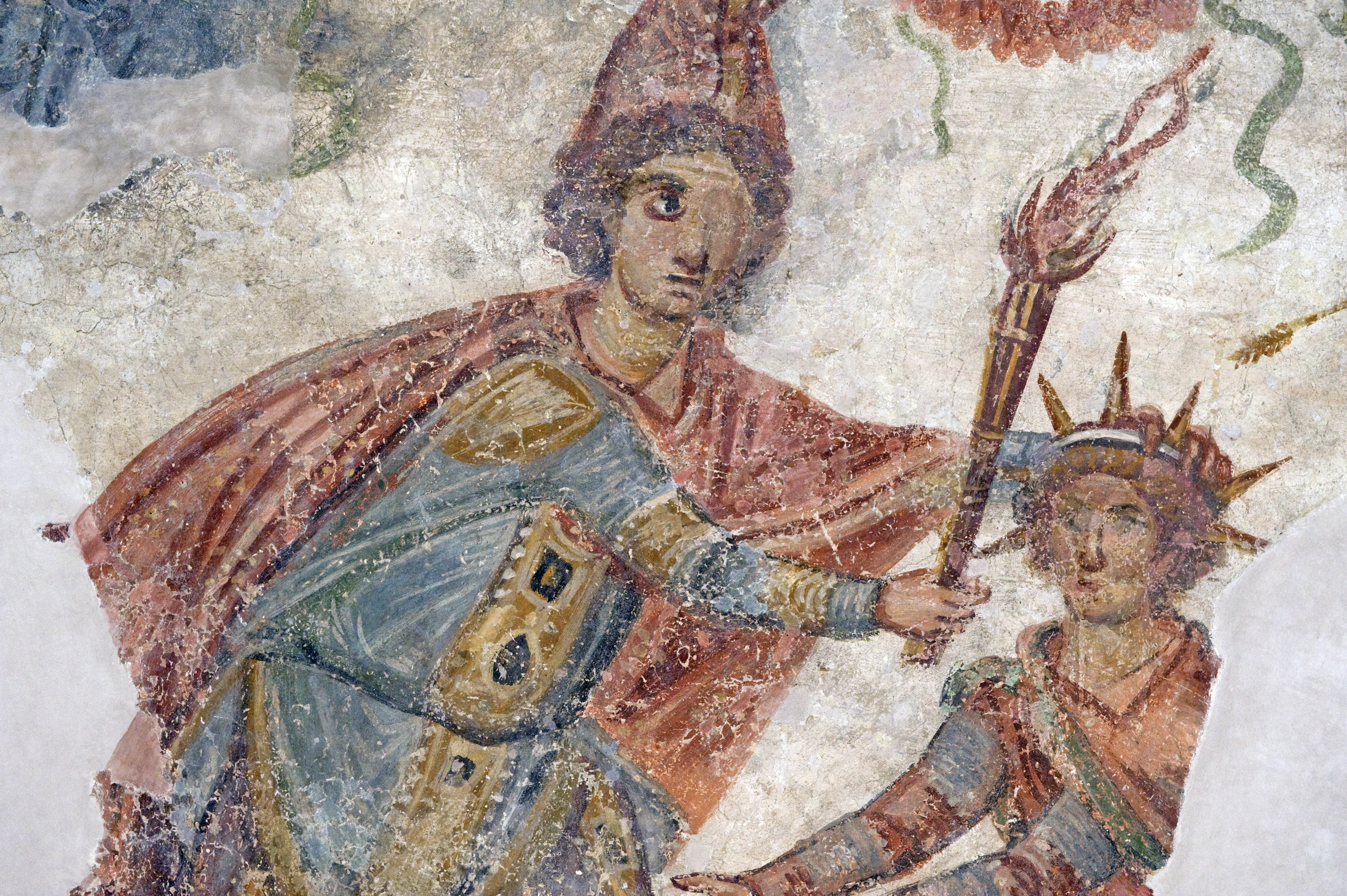
Helios in front of Mithras, fresco from a Mithraeum, Hama museum, Syria.

Helios is also assimilated with Mithras in some of the Papyri, as he was by Emperor Julian. The Mithras Liturgy combines them as Helios-Mithras, who is said to have revealed the secrets of immortality to the magician who wrote the text. Some of the texts describe Helios-Mithras navigating the Sun's path not in a chariot but in a boat, an apparent identification with the Egyptian sun god Ra. Helios is also described as "restraining the serpent", likely a reference to Apophis, the serpent god who, in Egyptian myth, is said to attack Ra's ship during his nightly journey through the underworld.

In many of the Papyri, Helios is also strongly identified with Iao, a name derived from that of the Hebrew god Yahweh, and shares several of his titles including Sabaoth and Adonai. He is also assimilated as the Agathos Daemon, who is also identified elsewhere in the texts as "the greatest god, lord Horus Harpokrates".

The Neoplatonist philosophers Proclus and Iamblichus attempted to interpret many of the syntheses found in the Greek Magical Papyri and other writings that regarded Helios as all-encompassing, with the attributes of many other divine entities. Proclus described Helios as a cosmic god consisting of many forms and traits. These are "coiled up" within his being, and are variously distributed to all that "participate in his nature", including angels, daemons, souls, animals, herbs, and stones. All of these things were important to the Neoplatonic practice of theurgy, magical rituals intended to invoke the gods in order to ultimately achieve union with them. Iamblichus noted that theurgy often involved the use of "stones, plants, animals, aromatic substances, and other such things holy and perfect and godlike." For theurgists, the elemental power of these items sacred to particular gods utilizes a kind of sympathetic magic.

=== Epithets ===
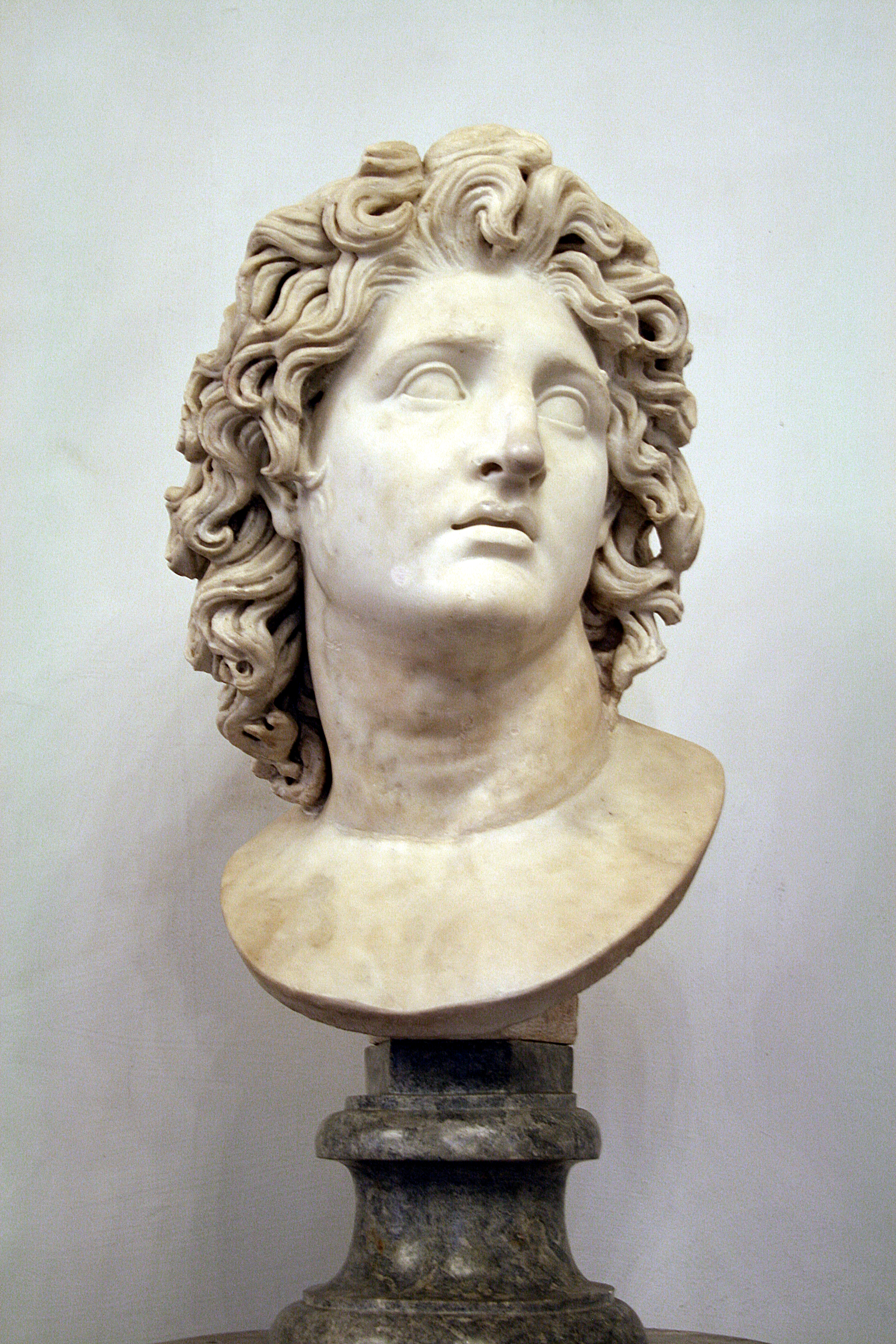
Bust of Alexander the Great as an eidolon of Helios (Musei Capitolini).

The Greek sun god had various bynames or epithets, which over time in some cases came to be considered separate deities associated with the Sun. Among these are:

Acamas (/ɑːˈkɑːmɑːs/; ah-KAH-mahss; Άκάμας, "Akàmas"), meaning "tireless, unwearying", as he repeats his never-ending routine day after day without cease.

Apollo (/əˈpɒləʊ/; ə-POL-oh; Ἀπόλλων, "Apóllōn") here understood to mean "destroyer", the sun as a more destructive force.

Callilampetes (/kəˌliːlæmˈpɛtiːz/; kə-LEE-lam-PET-eez; Καλλιλαμπέτης, "Kallilampétēs"), "he who glows lovely".

Elasippus (/ɛlˈæsɪpəs/; el-AH-sip-əss; Ἐλάσιππος, "Elásippos"), meaning "horse-driving".

Elector (/əˈlɛktər/; ə-LEK-tər; Ἠλέκτωρ, "Ēléktōr") of uncertain derivation (compare Electra), often translated as "beaming" or "radiant", especially in the combination Ēlektōr Hyperiōn.

Eleutherius (/iːˈljuːθəriəs/; ee-LOO-thər-ee-əs; Ἐλευθέριος, "Eleuthérios) "the liberator", epithet under which he was worshipped in Troezen in Argolis, also shared with Dionysus and Eros.

Hagnus (/ˈhæɡnəs/; HAG-nəs; Ἁγνός, Hagnós), meaning "pure", "sacred" or "purifying."

Hecatus (/ˈhɛkətəs/; HEK-ə-təs; Ἕκατος, "Hékatos"), "from afar," also Hecatebolus (/hɛkəˈtɛbəʊləs/; hek-ə-TEB-əʊ-ləs; Ἑκατήβολος, "Hekatḗbolos") "the far-shooter", i.e. the sun's rays considered as arrows.

Horotrophus (/hɔːrˈɔːtrɔːfəs/; hor-OT-roff-əss; Ὡροτρόφος, "Hōrotróphos"), "nurturer of the Seasons/Hours", in combination with kouros, "youth".

Hyperion (/haɪˈpɪəriən/; hy-PEER-ree-ən; Ὑπερίων, "Hyperíōn") and Hyperionides (/haɪˌpɪəriəˈnaɪdiːz/; hy-PEER-ee-ə-NY-deez; Ὑπεριονίδης, "Hyperionídēs"), "superus, high up" and "son of Hyperion" respectively, the sun as the one who is above, and also the name of his father.

Isodaetes (/ˌaɪsəˈdeɪtiːz/; EYE-sə-DAY-teez; Ἰσοδαίτης, "Isodaítēs"), literally "he that distributes equal portions", cult epithet also shared with Dionysus.

Paean (/ˈpiːən/ PEE-ən; Παιάν, Paiān), physician, healer, a healing god and an epithet of Apollo and Asclepius.

Panoptes (/pæˈnɒptiːs/; pan-OP-tees; Πανόπτης, "Panóptēs") "all-seeing" and Pantepoptes (/pæntɛˈpɒptiːs/; pan-tep-OP-tees; Παντεπόπτης, "Pantepóptēs") "all-supervising", as the one who witnessed everything that happened on earth.

Pasiphaes (/pəˈsɪfiiːs/; pah-SIF-ee-eess; Πασιφαής, "Pasiphaḗs"), "all-shining", also the name of one of his daughters.

Patrius (/ˈpætriəs/; PAT-ree-əs; Πάτριος, "Pátrios") "of the fathers, ancestral", related to his role as primogenitor of royal lines in several places.

Phaethon (/ˈfeɪθən/; FAY-thən; Φαέθων, "Phaéthōn") "the radiant", "the shining", also the name of his son and daughter.

Phasimbrotus (/ˌfæsɪmˈbrɒtəs/; FASS-im-BROT-əs; Φασίμβροτος, "Phasímbrotos") "he who sheds light to the mortals", the sun.

Philonamatus (/ˌfɪloʊˈnæmətəs/; FIL-oh-NAM-ə-təs; Φιλονάματος, "Philonámatos") "water-loving", a reference to him rising from and setting in the ocean.

Phoebus (/ˈfiːbəs/ FEE-bəs; Φοῖβος, Phoîbos), literally "bright", several Roman authors applied Apollo's byname to their sun god Sol.

Sirius (/ˈsɪrɪəs/; SEE-ree-əss; Σείριος, "Seírios") literally meaning "scorching", and also the name of the Dog Star.

Soter (/ˈsoʊtər/; SOH-tər; Σωτὴρ, "Sōtḗr") "the saviour", epithet under which he was worshipped in Megalopolis, Arcadia.

Terpsimbrotus (/ˌtɜːrpsɪmˈbrɒtəs/; TURP-sim-BROT-əs; Τερψίμβροτος, "Terpsímbrotos") "he who gladdens mortals", with his warm, life-giving beams.

Titan (/ˈtaɪtən/; TY-tən; Τιτάν, "Titán"), possibly connected to τιτώ meaning "day" and thus "god of the day".

Whether Apollo's epithets Aegletes and Asgelatas in the island of Anaphe, both connected to light, were borrowed from epithets of Helios either directly or indirectly is hard to say.

== Identification with other gods ==
=== Apollo ===
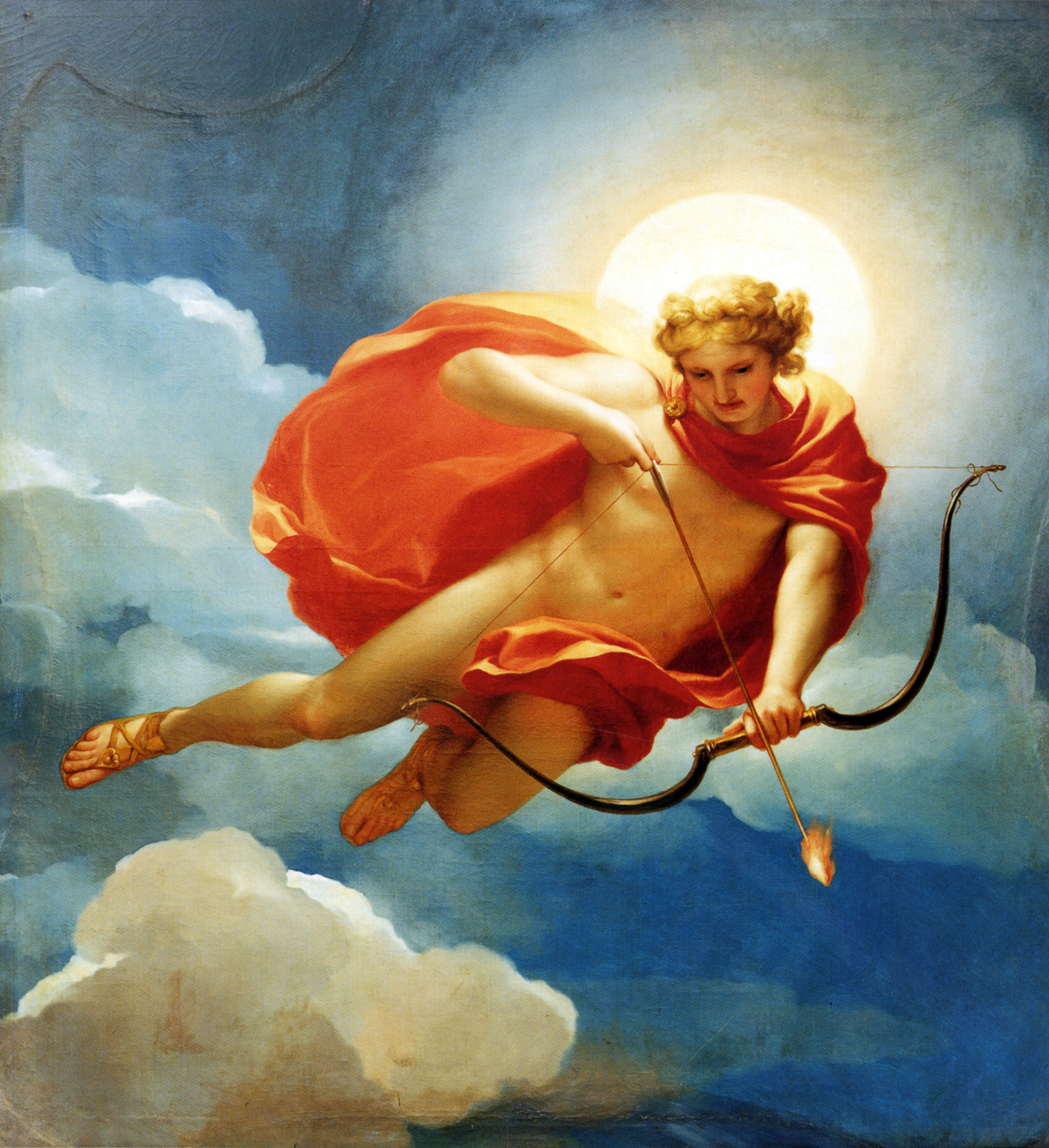
Helios as the personification of midday, rococo painting by Anton Raphael Mengs (c. 1765) showing apollonian traits, such as the lack of a chariot, that were absent in mythology and Hellenic art.

Helios is sometimes identified with Apollo: "Different names may refer to the same being," Walter Burkert argues, "or else they may be consciously equated, as in the case of Apollo and Helios." Apollo was associated with the Sun as early as the fifth century BC, though widespread conflation between him and the Sun god was a later and not fully consistent phenomenon. The earliest certain reference to Apollo being identified with Helios appears in the surviving fragments of Euripides's play Phaethon in a speech near the end.

CLYMENE:

O Helios with your beautiful light, you have destroyed me and Phaethon here! You are rightly called Apollo among men, where any knows the unspoken meaning of gods' names!

James Diggle interprets this fragment as connecting the etymology of the name Apollo with the identification of the mythological figures "It is not surprising that Helios, having destroyed my son and myself, is called Apollo by people who know that the name Apollo means Destroyer"

By Hellenistic times Apollo had become closely connected with the Sun in cult and Phoebus (Greek Φοῖβος, "bright"), the epithet most commonly given to Apollo, was also applied by Latin poets to the Sun-god Sol.

The identification became a commonplace in philosophic and some Orphic texts. Pseudo-Eratosthenes writes about Orpheus in Placings Among the Stars, section 24:

But having gone down into Hades because of his wife and seeing what sort of things were there, he did not continue to worship Dionysus, because of whom he was famous, but he thought Helios to be the greatest of the gods, Helios whom he also addressed as Apollo. Rousing himself each night toward dawn and climbing the mountain called Pangaion, he would await the Sun's rising, so that he might see it first. Therefore, Dionysus, being angry with him, sent the Bassarides, as Aeschylus the tragedian says; they tore him apart and scattered the limbs.

Dionysus and Asclepius are sometimes also identified with this Apollo Helios.

Strabo wrote that Artemis and Apollo were associated with Selene and Helios respectively due to the changes those two celestial bodies caused in the temperature of the air, as the twins were gods of pestilential diseases and sudden deaths. Pausanias also linked Apollo's association with Helios as a result of his profession as a healing god. In the Orphic Hymns, Helios is addressed as Paean ("healer") and holding a golden lyre, both common descriptions for Apollo; similarly Apollo in his own hymn is described as Titan and shedding light to the mortals, both common epithets of Helios.

According to Athenaeus, Telesilla wrote that the song sung in honour of Apollo is called the "Sun-loving song" (φιληλιάς, philhēliás), that is, a song meant to make the Sun come forth from the clouds, sung by children in bad weather; but Julius Pollux describing a philhelias in greater detail makes no mention of Apollo, only Helios. Scythinus of Teos wrote that Apollo uses the bright light of the Sun (λαμπρὸν πλῆκτρον ἡλίου φάος) as his harp-quill and in a fragment of Timotheus's lyric, Helios is invoked as an archer with the invocation Ἰὲ Παιάν (a common way of addressing the two medicine gods), though it most likely was part of esoteric doctrine, rather than a popular and widespread belief.

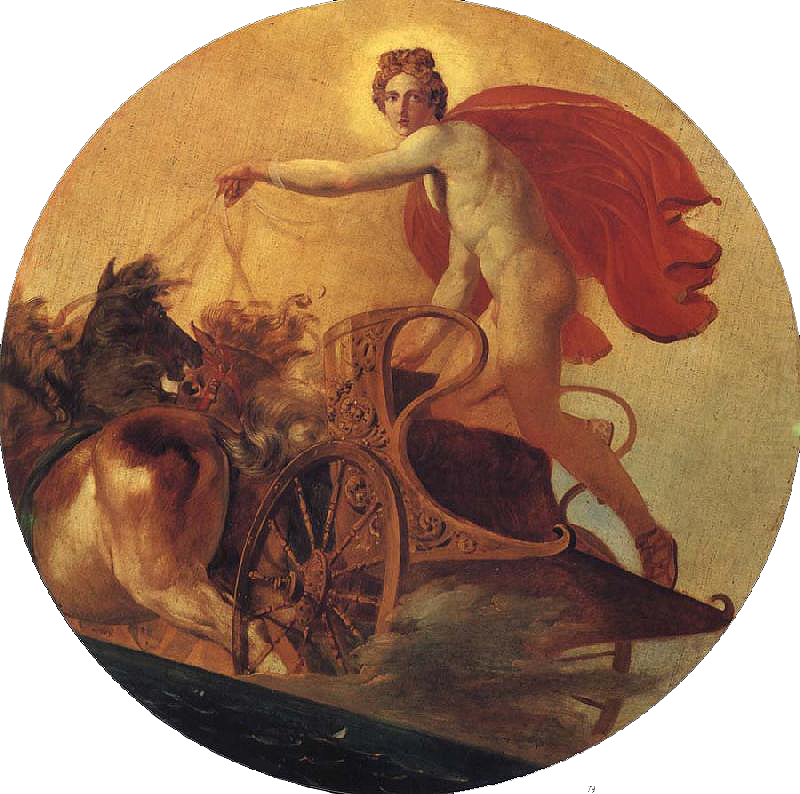
Phoebus Driving his Chariot by Karl Bryullov, oil on canvas, 19th century.

Classical Latin poets also used Phoebus as a byname for the Sun-god, whence come common references in later European poetry to Phoebus and his chariot as a metaphor for the Sun. Ancient Roman authors who used "Phoebus" for Sol as well as Apollo include Ovid, Virgil, Statius, and Seneca. Representations of Apollo with solar rays around his head in art also belong to the time of the Roman Empire, particularly under Emperor Elagabalus in 218-222 AD.

=== Usil ===
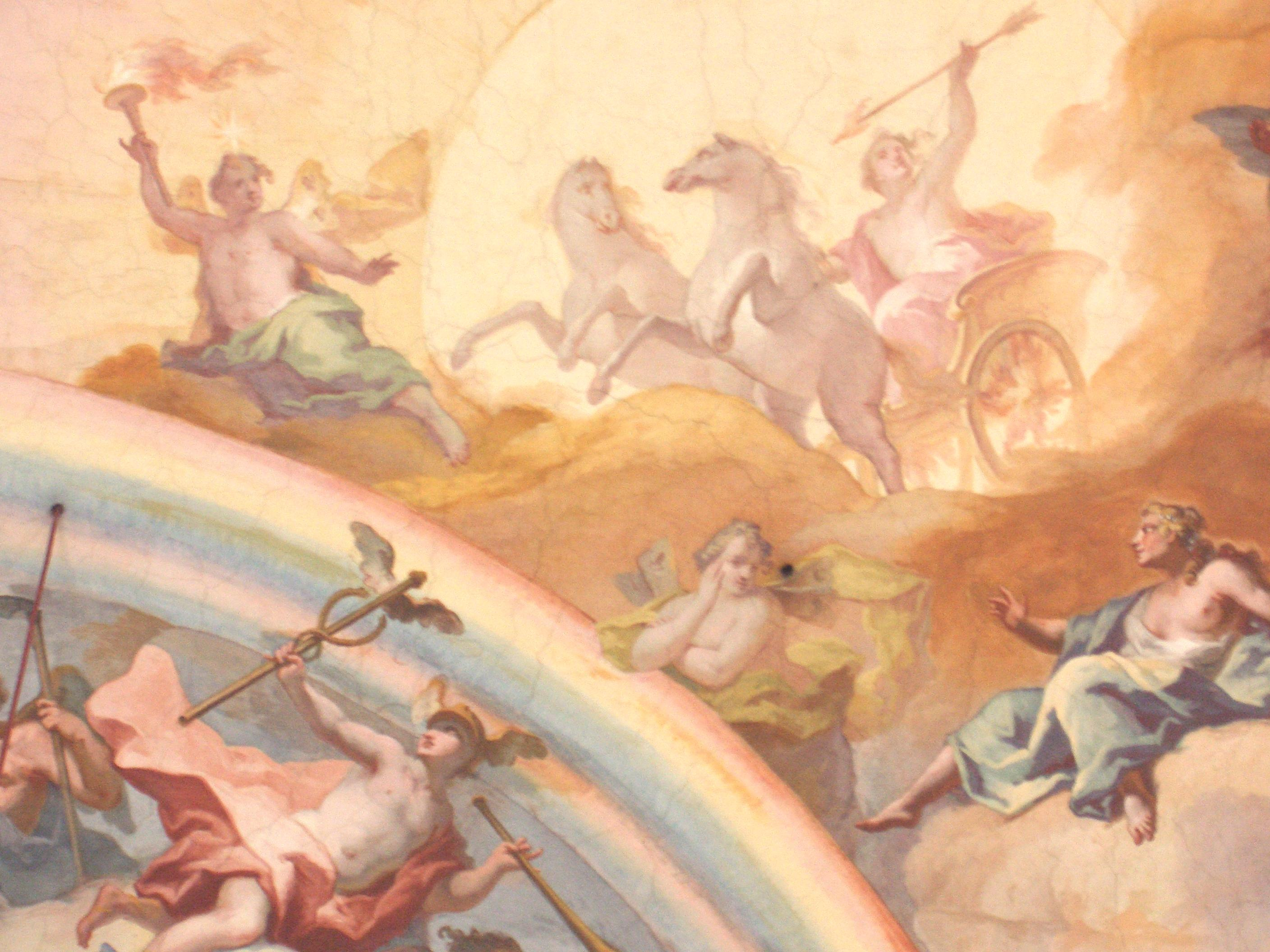
Helios in the Sun chariot accompanied by Phosphorus and Hermes, fresco at Nymphenburg Palace, Munich.

The Etruscan god of the Sun was Usil. His name appears on the bronze liver of Piacenza, next to Tiur, the Moon. He appears, rising out of the sea, with a fireball in either outstretched hand, on an engraved Etruscan bronze mirror in late Archaic style. On Etruscan mirrors in Classical style, he appears with a halo. In ancient artwork, Usil is shown in close association with Thesan, the goddess of the dawn, something almost never seen with Helios and Eos, however in the area between Cetona and Chiusi a stone obelisk is found, whose relief decorations seem to have been interpreted as referring to a solar sanctuary: what appears to be a Sun boat, the heads of Helios and Thesan, and a cock, likewise referring to the Sunrise.

=== Zeus ===
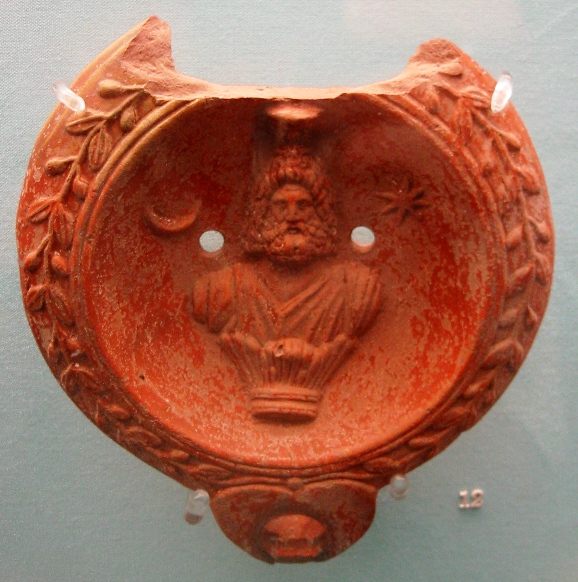
Serapis with Moon and Sun, oil lamp, Roman terracotta, British Museum.

Helios is also sometimes conflated in classical literature with the highest Olympian god, Zeus. An attested cult epithet of Zeus is Aleios Zeus, or "Zeus the Sun," from the Doric form of Helios's name. The inscribed base of Mammia's dedication to Helios and Zeus Meilichios, dating from the fourth or third century BC, is a fairly and unusually early evidence of the conjoint worship of Helios and Zeus. According to Plutarch, Helios is Zeus in his material form that one can interact with, and that's why Zeus owns the year, while the chorus in Euripides's Medea also link him to Zeus when they refer to Helios as "light born from Zeus". In his Orphic Hymn, Helios is addressed as "immortal Zeus". In Crete, the cult of Zeus Tallaios had incorporated several solar elements into his worship; "Talos" was the local equivalent of Helios. Helios is referred either directly as Zeus's eye, or clearly implied to be. For instance, Hesiod effectively describes Zeus's eye as the Sun. This perception is possibly derived from earlier Proto-Indo-European religion, in which the Sun is believed to have been envisioned as the eye of *Dyḗus Pḥ_{a}tḗr (see Hvare-khshaeta). An Orphic saying, supposedly given by an oracle of Apollo, goes:

"Zeus, Hades, Helios-Dionysus, three gods in one godhead!"

The Hellenistic period gave birth to Serapis, a Greco-Egyptian deity conceived by the Greeks as a chthonic aspect of Zeus, whose solar nature is indicated by the Sun crown and rays the Greeks depicted him with. Frequent joint dedications to "Zeus-Serapis-Helios" have been found all over the Mediterranean. There is evidence of Zeus being worshipped as a solar god in the Aegean island of Amorgos which, if correct, could mean that Sun elements in Zeus's worship could be as early as the fifth century BC.

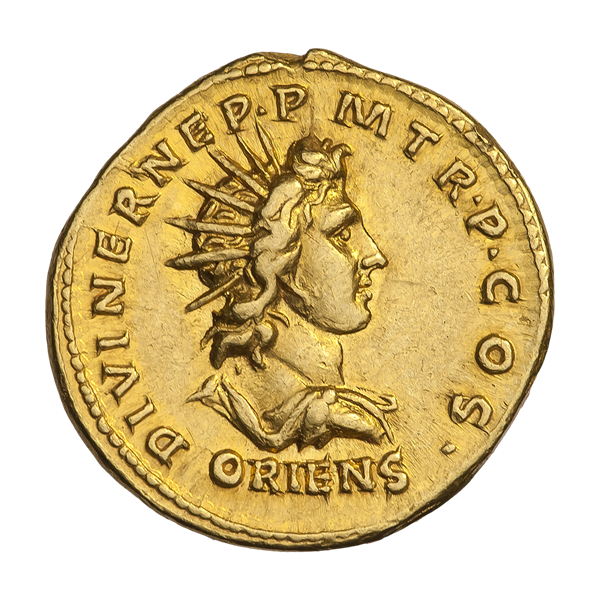
Helios on a golden coin from 117 AD.

=== Hades and Pluto ===
Helios seems to have been connected to some degree with Hades, the god of the underworld, particularly as Hades himself grew identified with Pluto and with Serapis.

A dedicatory inscription from Smyrna describes a 1st–2nd century sanctuary to "God Himself" as the most exalted of a group of six deities, including clothed statues of Plouton Helios and Koure Selene, or in other words "Pluto the Sun" and "Kore the Moon". Roman poet Apuleius describes a rite in which the Sun appears at midnight to the initiate at the gates of Proserpina; the suggestion here is that this midnight Sun could be Plouton Helios. Pluto-Helios seems to reflect the Egyptian idea of the nocturnal Sun that penetrated the realm of the dead.

An old oracle from Claros said that the names of Zeus, Hades, Helios, Dionysus and Jao all represented the Sun at different seasons. Macrobius wrote that Iao/Jao is "Hades in winter, Zeus in spring, Helios in summer, and Iao in autumn."

=== Cronus ===
Diodorus Siculus reported that the Chaldeans called Cronus (Saturnus) by the name Helios, or the Sun, and he explained that this was because Saturn was the "most conspicuous" of the planets.

Hyginus similarly connects Helios to Cronus through the planet Saturn, associating its name to the son of Helios, Phaethon. The name "Phaethon" was more commonly associated with the planet Jupiter instead.

=== Uranus ===
The Derveni Papyrus identifies Helios with Uranus by naming Cronus as child of Uranus and Gaia in one section yet naming Cronus elsewhere as child of Helios and Gaia. This Uranus also has clear solar attributes, which are later acquired by Zeus.

=== Mithras ===
Helios is frequently conflated with Mithras in iconography, as well as being worshipped alongside him as Helios-Mithras. The earliest artistic representations of the "chariot god" come from the Parthian period (3rd century) in Persia where there is evidence of rituals being performed for the sun god by Magi, indicating an assimilation of the worship of Helios and Mithras.

== Iconography ==
=== Depiction and symbols ===
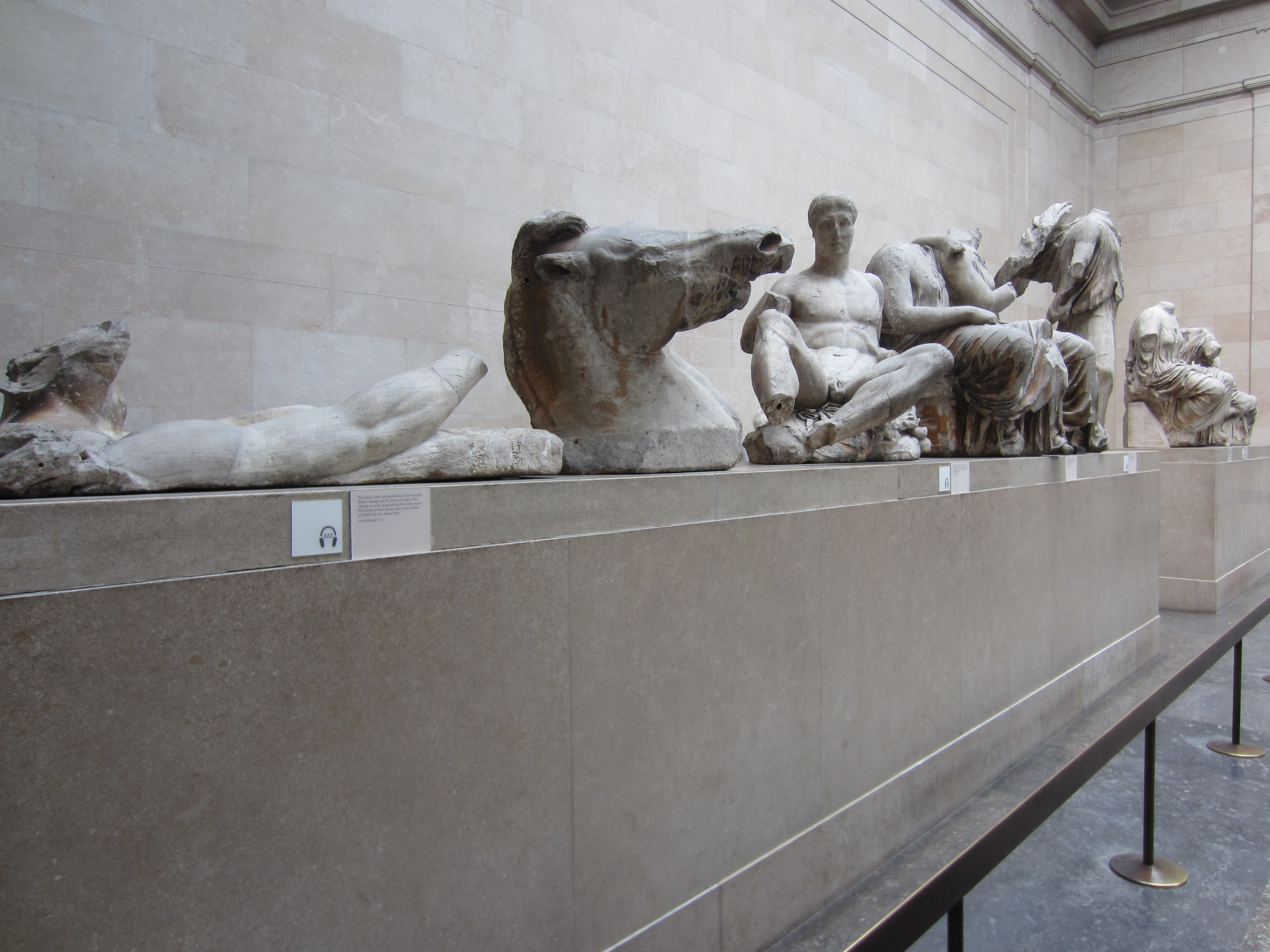
Helios (far left, head missing) marble from the east pediment of the Parthenon, British Museum

The earliest depictions of Helios in a humanoid form date from the late sixth and early fifth centuries BC in Attic black-figure vases, and typically show him frontally as a bearded man on his chariot with a sun disk. A red-figure on a polychrome bobbin by a follower of the Brygos painter already signifies a shift in the god's depiction, painting him as a youthful, beardless figure. In later art, he is consistently drawn as beardless and young. In it, he is typically depicted with a radiant crown, with the right hand often raised, a gesture of power (which came to be a definitional feature of solar iconography), the left hand usually holding a whip or a globe.

In Rhodian coins, he was shown as a beardless god, with thick and flowing hair, surrounded by beams. He was also presented as a young man clad in tunic, with curling hair and wearing buskins. Just like Selene, who is sometimes depicted with a lunar disk rather than a crescent, Helios too has his own solar one instead of a sun crown in some depictions. It is likely that Helios's later image as a warrior-charioteer might be traced back to the Mycenaean period; the symbol of the disc of the sun is displayed in scenes of rituals from both Mycenae and Tiryns, and large amounts of chariots used by the Mycenaeans are recorded in Linear B tablets.

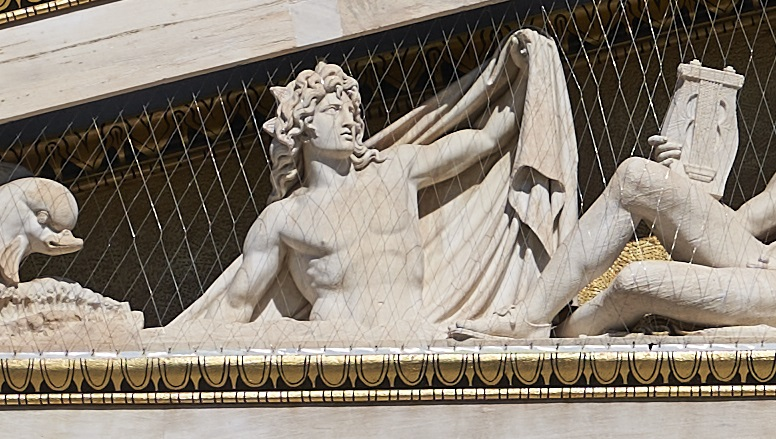
Helios witnessing the birth of Athena, detail from the pediment (far-left) of the Academy of Athens, by Leonidas Drosis, Greece

In archaic art, Helios rising in his chariot was a type of motive. Helios in ancient pottery is usually depicted rising from the sea in his four-horse chariot, either as a single figure or connecting to some myth, indicating that it takes place at dawn. An Attic black-figure vase shows Heracles sitting on the shores of the Ocean river, while next to him a pair of arrows protrude from Helios, crowned with a solar disk and driving his chariot.

Helios adorned the east pediment of the Parthenon, along with Selene. Helios (again with Selene) also framed the birth of Aphrodite on the base of the Statue of Zeus at Olympia, the Judgement of Paris, and possibly the birth of Pandora on the base of the Athena Parthenos statue. They were also featured in the pedimental group of the temple at Delphi. In dynamic Hellenistic art, Helios along with other luminary deities and Rhea-Cybele, representing reason, battle the Giants (who represent irrationality).

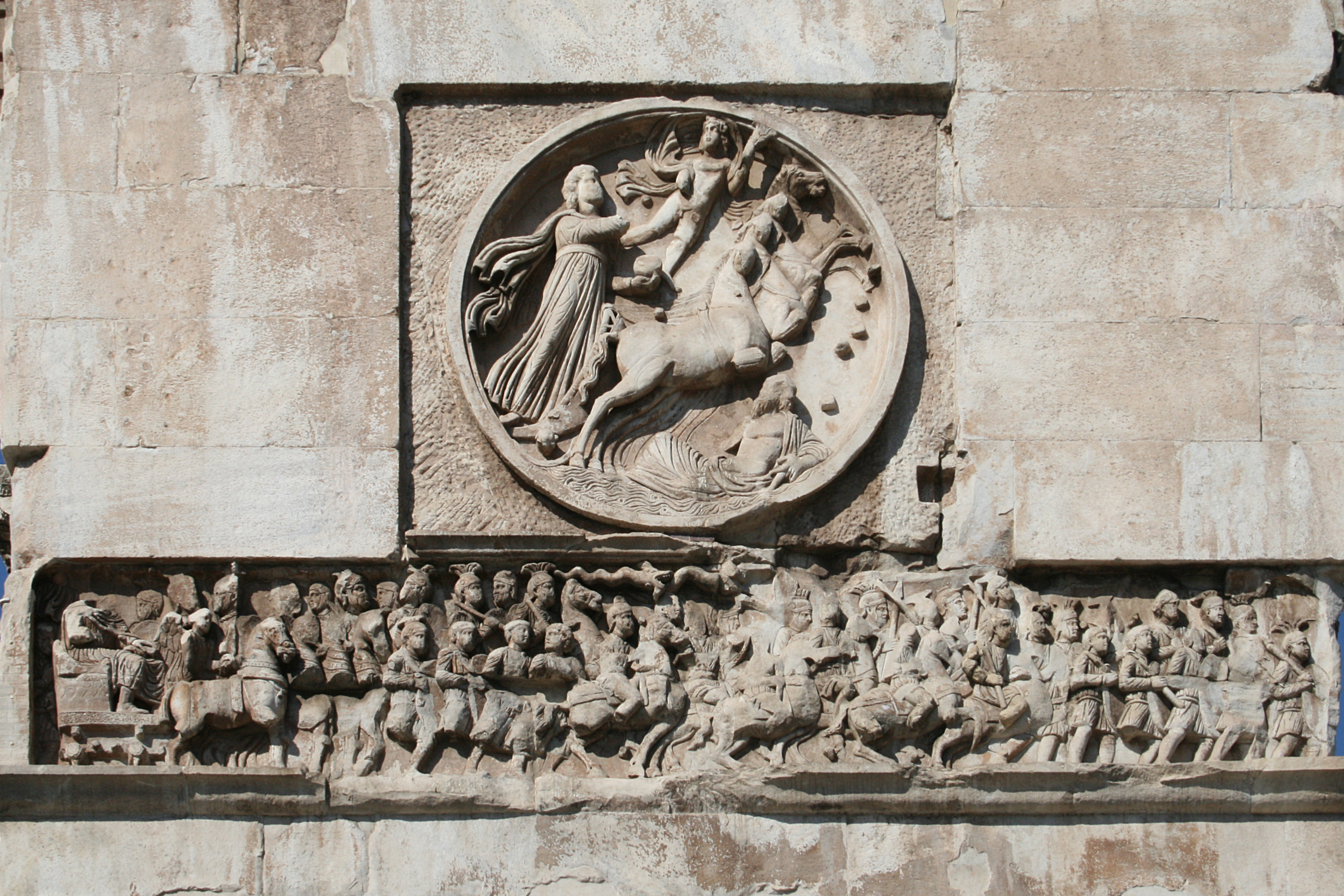
Sol in the east side of the Arch of Constantine, Rome.

In Elis, he was depicted with rays coming out of his head in an image made of wood with gilded clothing and marble head, hands and feet. Outside the market of the city of Corinth stood a gateway on which stood two gilded chariots; one carrying Helios's son Phaethon, the other Helios himself.

Helios appears infrequently in gold jewelry before Roman times; extant examples include a gold medallion with its bust from the Gulf of Elaia in Anatolia, where he's depicted frontally with a head of unruly hair, and a golden medallion of the Pelinna necklace.

His iconography, used by the Ptolemies after representations of Alexander the Great as Alexander-Helios, came to symbolize power and epiphany, and was borrowed by several Egyptian deities in the Roman period. Other rulers who had their portraits done with solar features include Ptolemy III Euergetes, one of the Ptolemaic kings of Egypt, of whom a bust with holes in the fillet for the sunrays and gold coins depicting him with a radiant halo on his head like Helios and holding the aegis exist.

=== Late Roman era ===
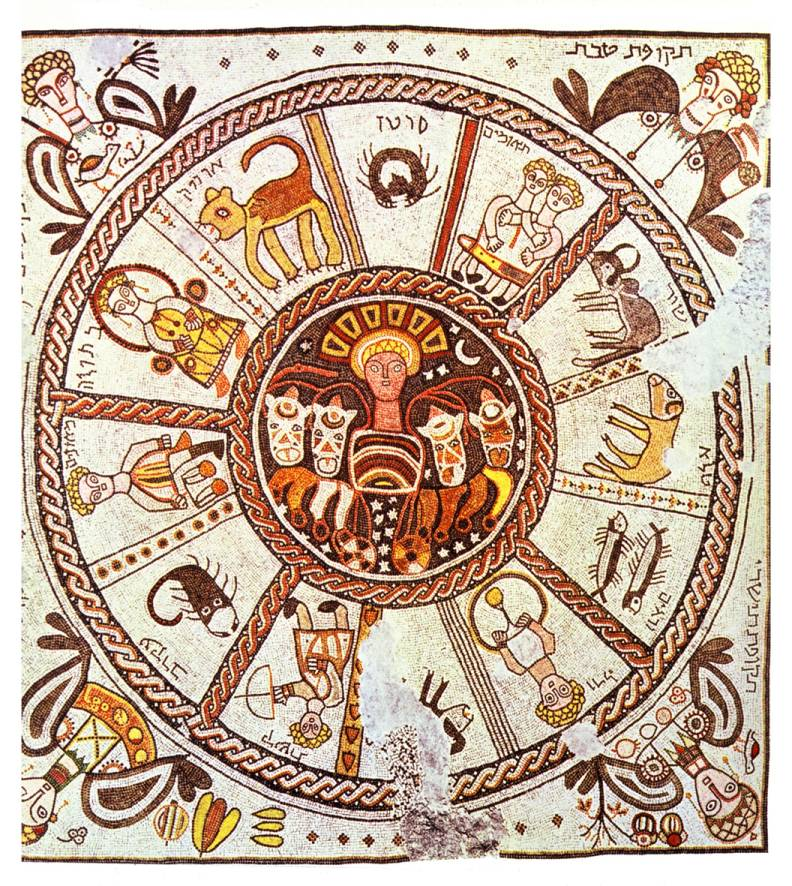
Helios surrounded by the zodiac in a mosaic pavement of a 6th-century synagogue at Beth Alpha, Israel.

Helios was also frequently depicted in mosaics, usually surrounded by the twelve zodiac signs and accompanied by Selene. From the third and fourth centuries CE onwards, the sun god was seen as an official imperial Roman god and thus appeared in various forms in monumental artworks. The cult of Helios/Sol had a notable function in Eretz Israel; Helios was Constantine the Great's patron, and so that ruler came to be identified with Helios. In his new capital city, Constantinople, Constantine recycled a statue of Helios to represent himself in his portrait, as Nero had done with Sol, which was not an uncommon practice among pagans. A considerable portion if not the majority of Jewish Helios material dates from the 3rd through the 6th centuries CE, including numerous mosaics of the god in Jewish synagogues and invocation in papyri.

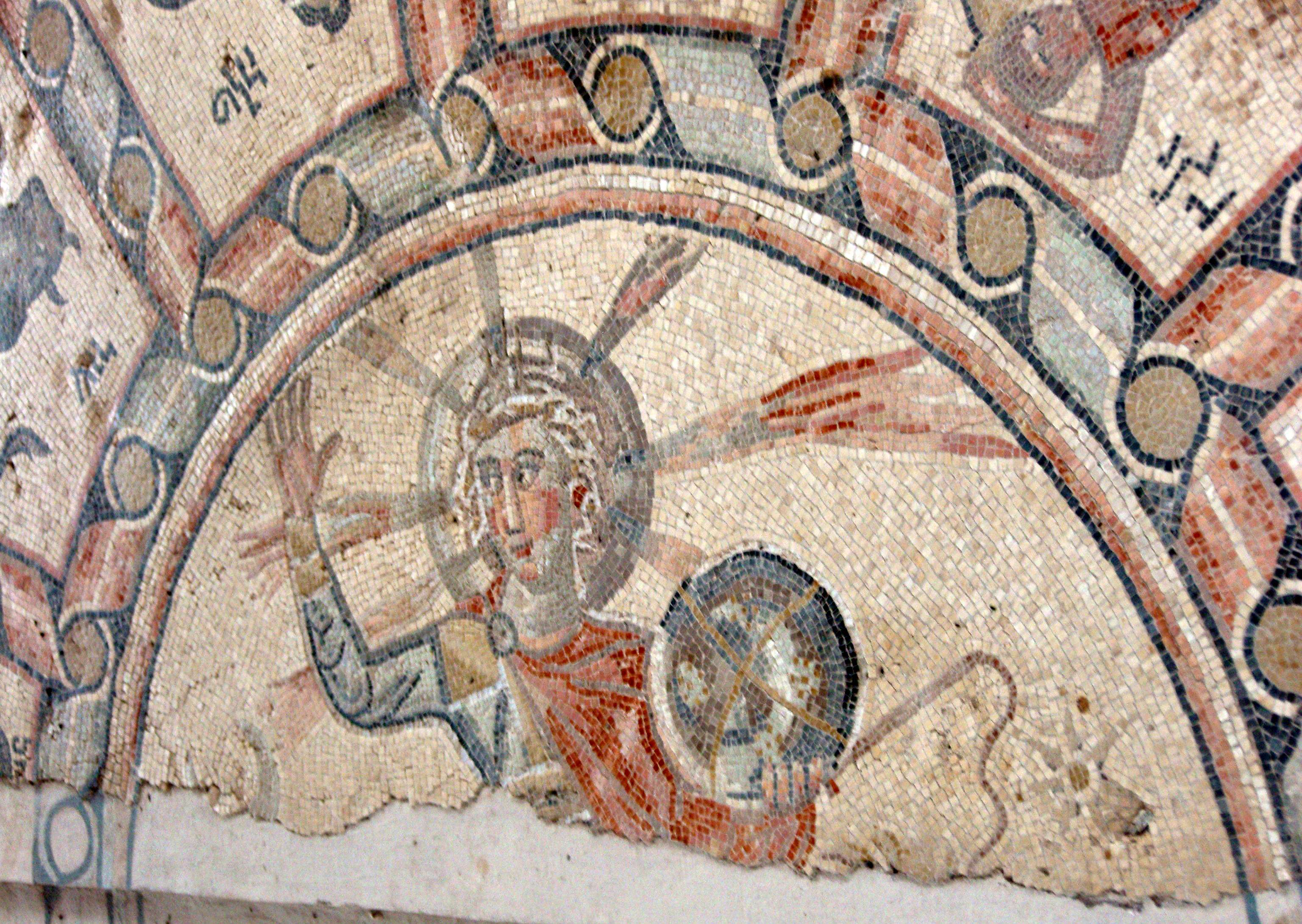
Helios in the Hammat Tiberias mosaic, Israel.

The sun god was depicted in mosaics in three places of the Land of Israel; at the synagogues of Hammat Tiberias, Beth Alpha and Naaran. In the mosaic of the Hammat Tiberias, Helios is wrapped in a partially gilded tunic fastened with a fibula and sporting a seven-rayed halo with his right hand uplifted, while his left holds a globe and a whip; his chariot is drawn as a frontal box with two large wheels pulled by four horses. At the Beth Alpha synagogue, Helios is at the centre of the circle of the zodiac mosaic, together with the Torah shrine between menorahs, other ritual objects, and a pair of lions, while the Seasons are in spandrels. The frontal head of Helios emerges from the chariot box, with two wheels in side view beneath, and the four heads of the horses, likewise frontal, surmounting an array of legs. In the synagogue of Naaran, the god is dressed in a white tunic embellished with gemstones on the upper body; over the tunic is a paludamentum pinned with a fibula or bulla and decorated with a star motif, as he holds in his hand a scarf, the distinctive symbol of a ruler from the fourth century onward, and much like all other mosaics he's seated in his four-horse chariot. Temporary writings record "the sun has three letters of [God's] name written at its heart and the angels lead it" and "[t]he sun is riding on a chariot and rises decorated like a bridegroom". Both at Naaran and Beth Alpha the image of the sun is presented in a bust in frontal position, and a crown with nimbus and rays on his head. Helios at both Hammath Tiberias and Beth Alpha is depicted with seven rays emanating from his head, it has been argued that those two are significantly different; the Helios of Hammath Tiberias possesses all the attributes of Sol Invictus and thus the Roman emperors, those being the rayed crown, the raised right hand and the globe, all common Helios-Sol iconography of the late third and early fourth centuries AD.

Helios and Selene were also personified in the mosaic of the Monastery of Lady Mary at Beit She'an. Here he is not shown as Sol Invictus, the Unconquered Sun, but rather as a celestial body, his red hair symbolizing the sun.

The poplar tree was considered sacred to Helios, due to the sun-like brilliance its shining leaves have. A sacred poplar in an epigram written by Antipater of Thessalonica warns the reader not to harm her because Helios cares for her.

Aelian wrote that the wolf is a beloved animal to Helios; the wolf is also Apollo's sacred animal, and the god was often known as Apollo Lyceus, "wolf Apollo".

== In post-classical art ==
=== In painting ===
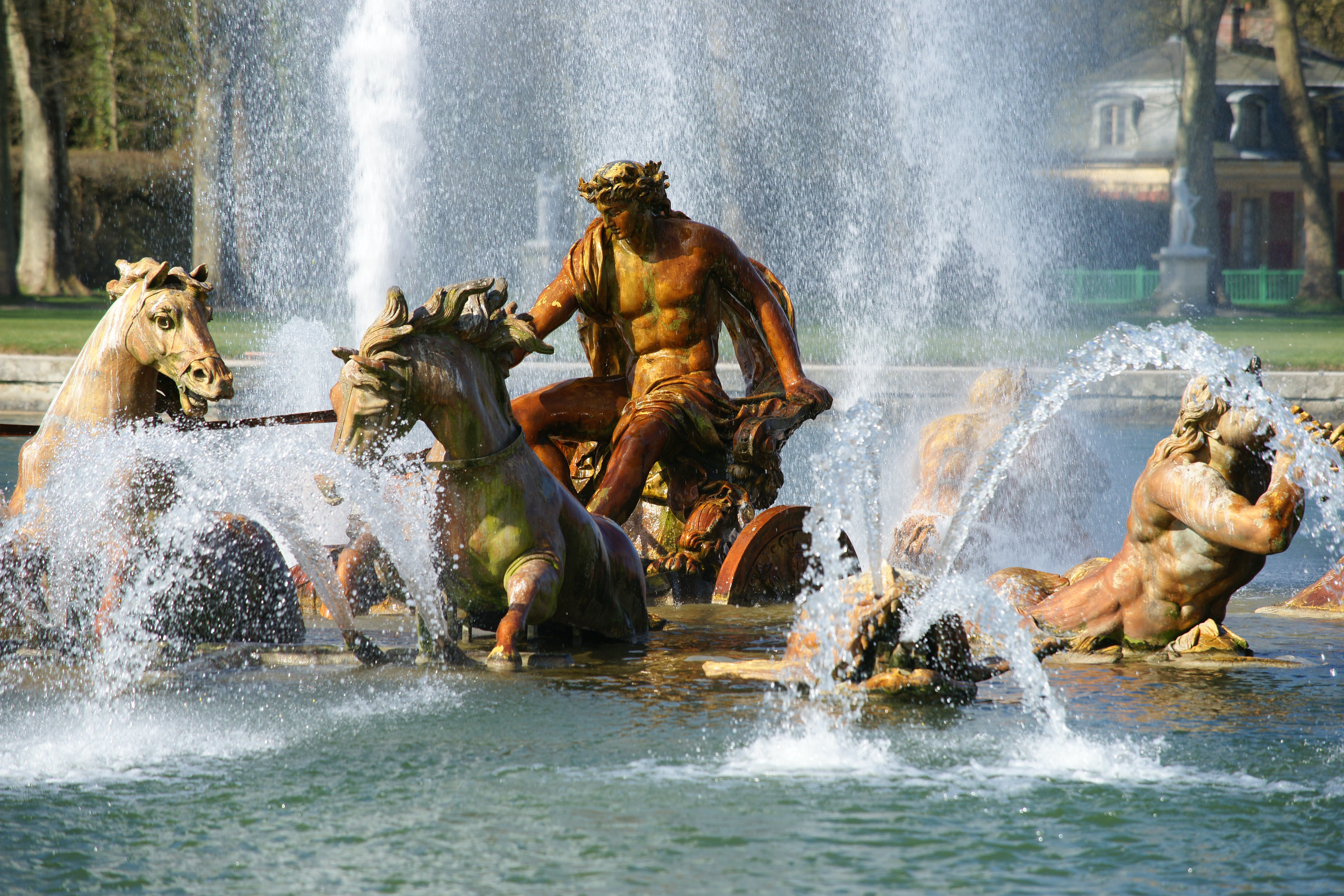
Apollo fountain in the Palace of Versailles, France.

Helios/Sol had little independent identity and presence during the Renaissance, where the main solar gods were Apollo, Bacchus and Hercules. In post-antiquity art, Apollo assimilates features and attributes of both classical Apollo and Helios, so that Apollo, along with his own iconography, is many times depicted as driving the four-horse chariot, representing both of them. In medieval tradition, each of the four horses had its own distinctive colour; in the Renaissance, however, all four are shown as white. In Versailles, a gilded statue depicts Apollo as the god of the sun, driving his quadriga as he sinks in the ocean; Apollo in this regard represents the king of France, le roi-soleil, "the Sun King".

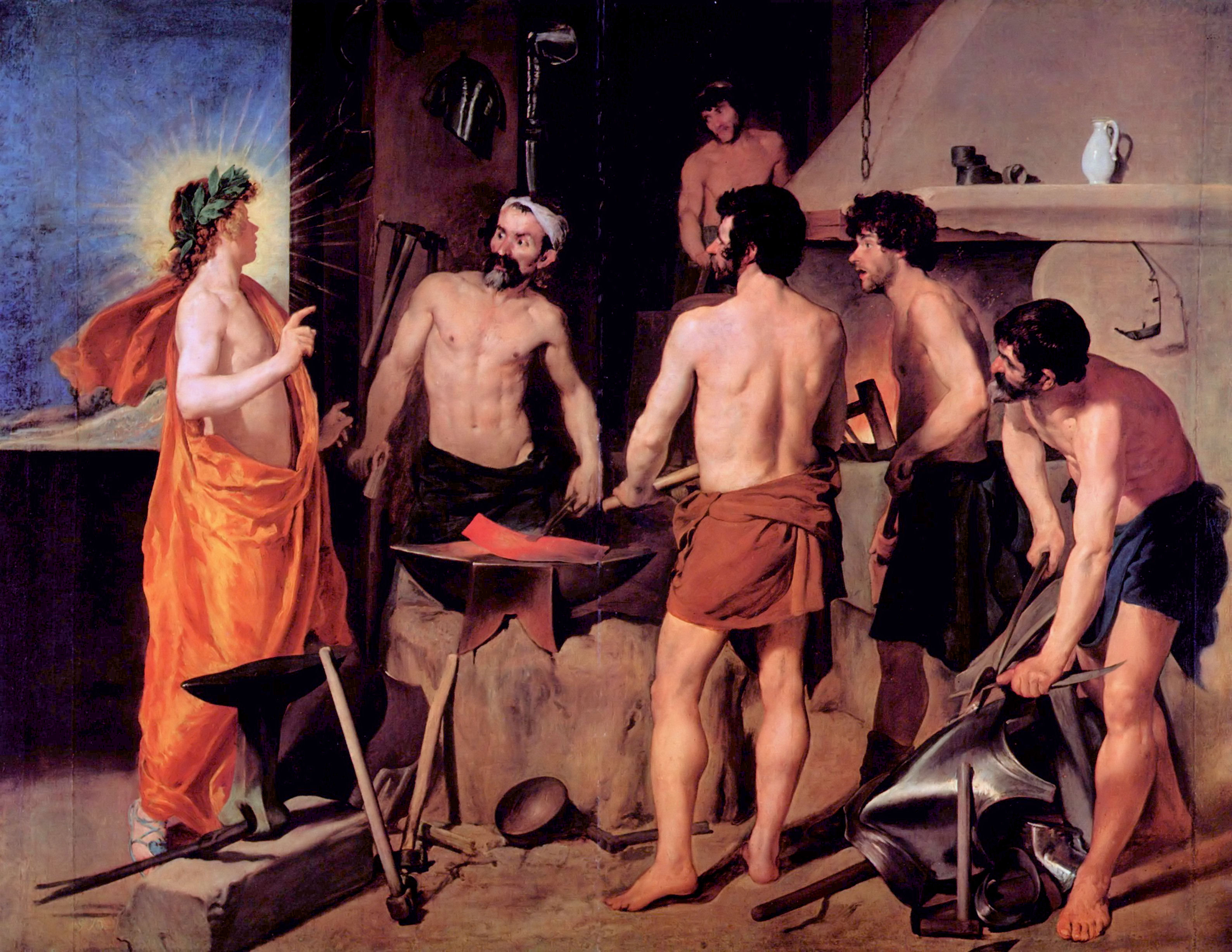
Apollo in the Forge of Vulcan, by Diego de Velázquez, 1630, oil on canvas.

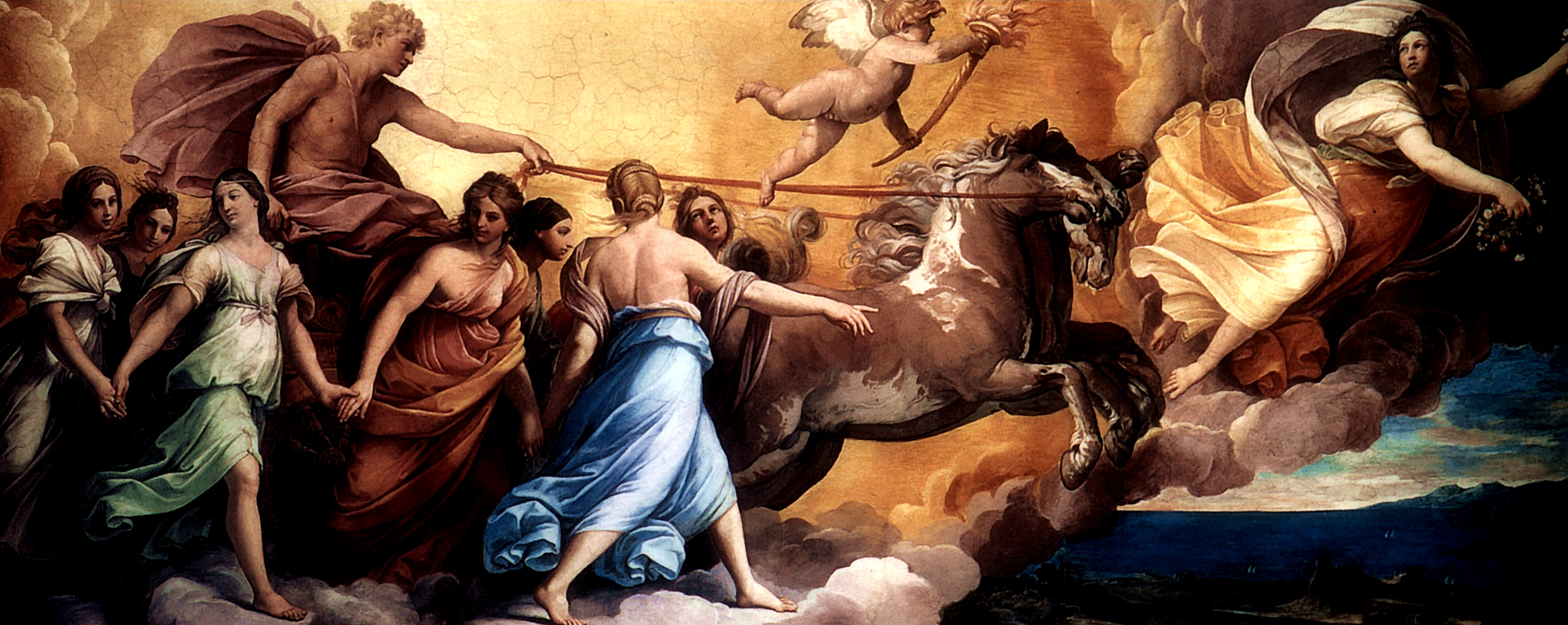
Aurora, by Guido Reni, 1613–14, ceiling fresco (Casino dell'Aurora, Rome).

Additionally to the chariot, Apollo is often drawn with a solar halo around his head and depicted in scenes of Helios's mythology. Accordingly, in depictions of Phaethon meeting his father and asking him the privilege of driving the sun chariot, artists gave to Phaethon's father the appearance and attributes of Apollo.

=== In literature ===
A love affair between the Sun god and the Nereid Amphitrite is introduced by French playwright Monléon's L'Amphytrite (1630); in the denouement, the Sun, scorned by the nymph, sets the land and sea ablaze, before the king of gods Jupiter intervenes and restores peace.

In Jean-Gilbert Durval's Le Travaux d'Ulysse (1631), after his men dine on the sacred sheep, the Sun appears in 'a chariot of light', accompanied by Jupiter; like in the myth, Jupiter kills Odysseus's crewmen with his lightning bolts when they put to sea again.

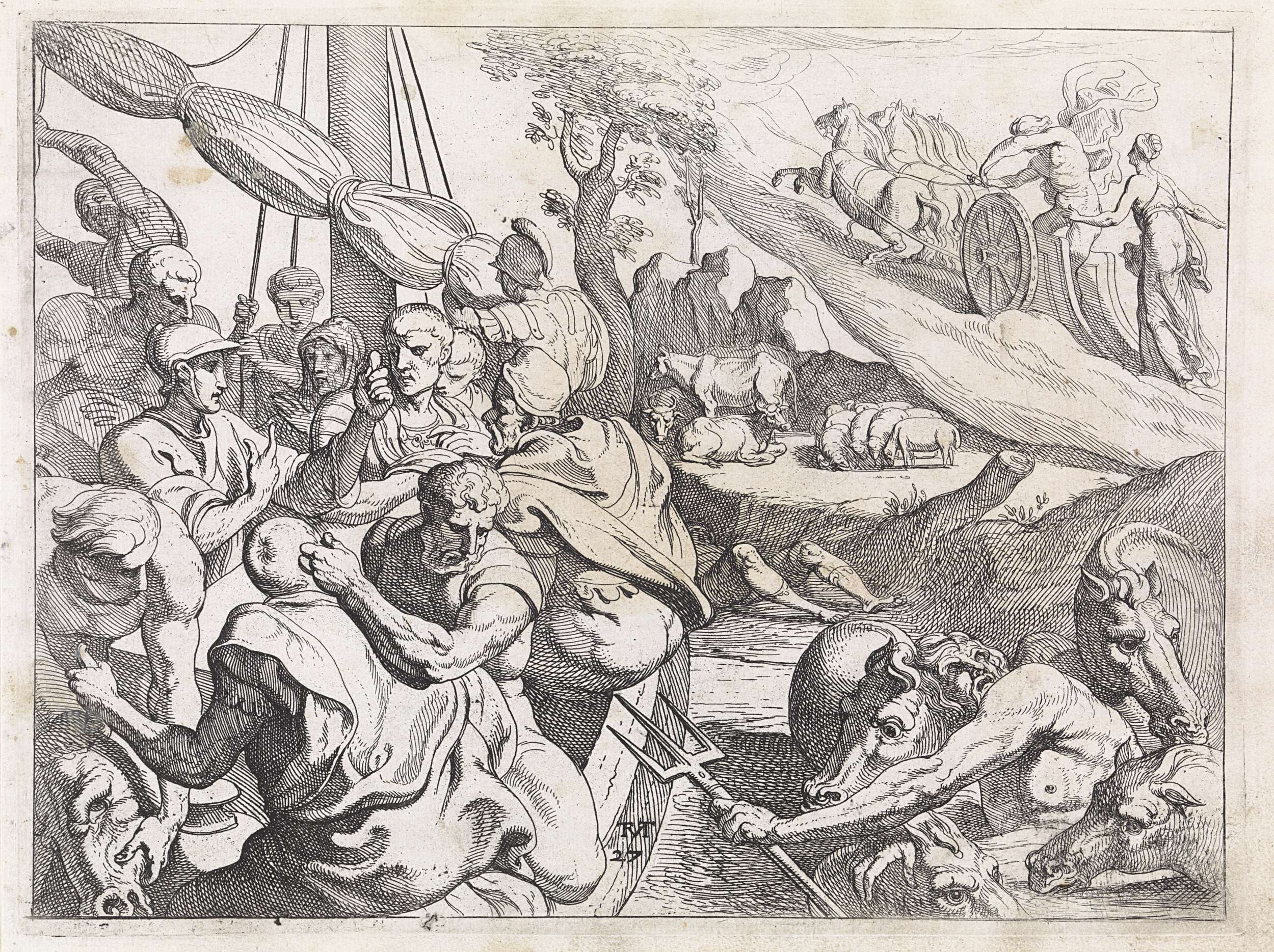
Odysseus's men eat the oxen, as a woman informs Helios, mounted on his chariot, engraving by Theodoor van Thulden, 1632–1633, Rijksmuseum, Netherlands.

French composer Jean-Baptiste Lully wrote in 1683 a tragédie en musique inspired by Ovid's handling of the tale of Helios's son, Phaëton, in which Phaëton obtains from his father the sun chariot in order to prove his divine origins to his rival Epaphus, but loses control and is instead struck and killed by Jupiter. The luxury of the Sun and his palace was no doubt meant to connect to the Sun King, Louis XIV, who used the sun for his emblem. This Apollo-Sun was frequently used to represent Louis XIV's reign, such as in Pierre Corneille's Andromède (1650).

Gerhart Hauptmann's Helios und Phaethon omits entirely the cosmic disaster Phaethon caused in order to focus on the relationship between the divine father and his mortal son, as Phaethon tries to convince his father he is well-suited for his five steeds, while Helios tries to dissuade his ambitious child, but eventually consents and gives him his reins and steeds to drive for a single day.

In James Joyce's book Ulysses, episode 14 is titled Oxen of the Sun, after the story of Odysseus's men and the cattle of Helios in book twelve of the Odyssey.

In A True Story, the Sun is an inhabited place, ruled by a king named Phaethon, referencing Helios's mythological son. The inhabitants of the Sun are at war with those of the Moon, ruled by King Endymion (Selene's lover), over colonization of the Morning Star (Aphrodite's planet).

== Namesakes ==
Helios is the Greek proper name for the Sun for both Ancient and Modern Greek, and additionally Helios, one of the craters of Hyperion, a moon of Saturn which bears Helios's father's name, is named after this Greek god. Several words relating to the Sun derive from "helios", including the rare adjective heliac (meaning "solar"), heliosphere, perihelion and aphelion among others.

The chemical element helium, a colorless, odorless, tasteless, non-toxic, inert, monatomic gas, first in the noble gas group in the periodic table, was named after Helios by Norman Lockyer and Edward Frankland, as it was first observed in the spectrum of the chromosphere of the Sun.

Helius is a genus of crane fly in the family Limoniidae that shares its name with the god.

A pair of probes that were launched into heliocentric orbit by NASA to study solar processes were called Helios A and Helios B.

== Modern reception ==
Helios often appears in modern and popular culture. Helios has been portrayed in many video games, such as in Sony Computer Entertainment's God of War: Chains of Olympus, God of War II and God of War III where the character is a boss and plays an antagonist role against Kratos. He also appears in the Wii game Metroid Prime 3: Corruption, where the second Seed guardian is named after Helios, and as an AI in the Deus Ex series.

== Gallery ==
Helios in art

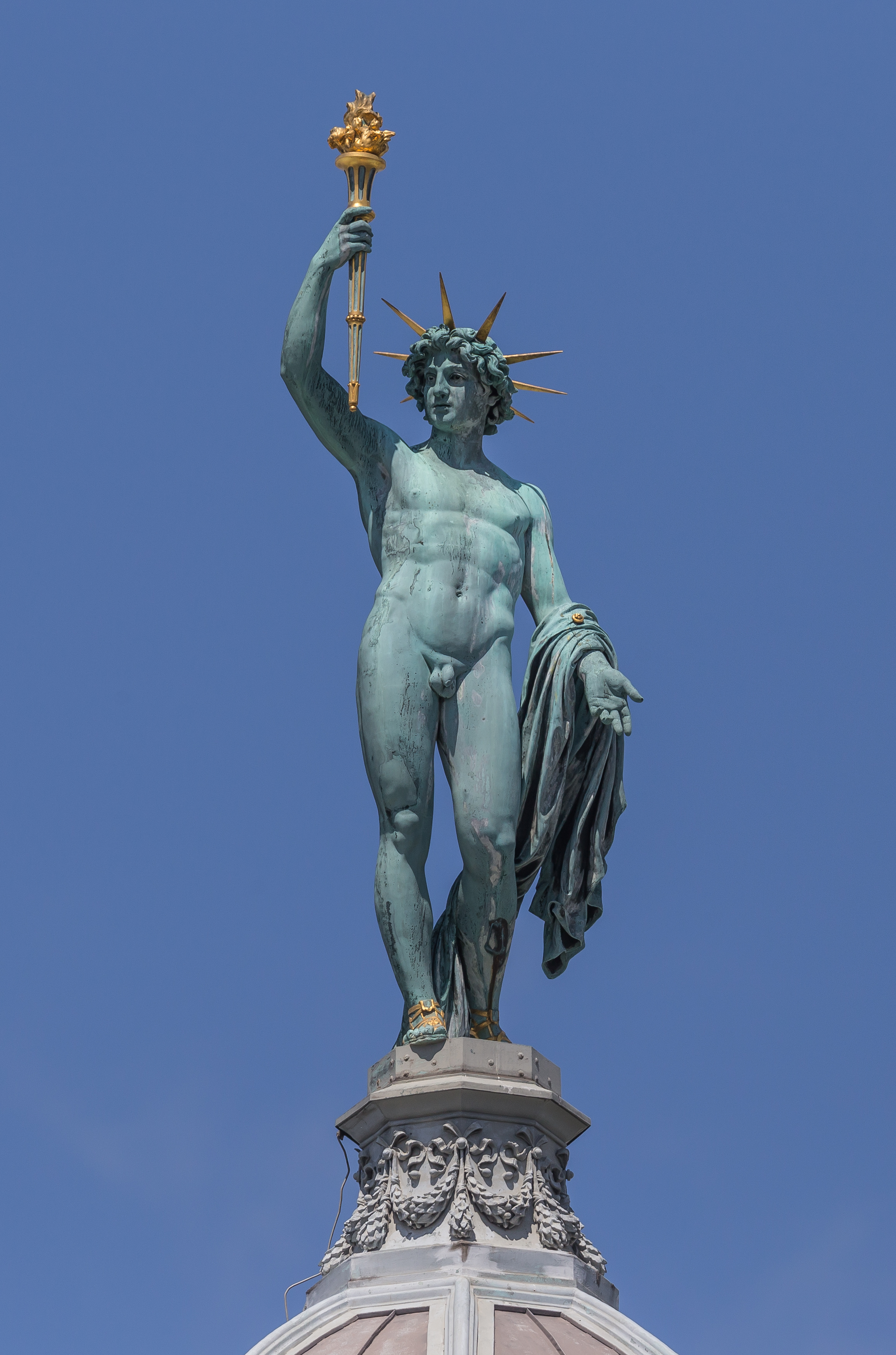
Helios statue by Johannes Benk (1873) at the Naturhistorisches Museum, Vienna.

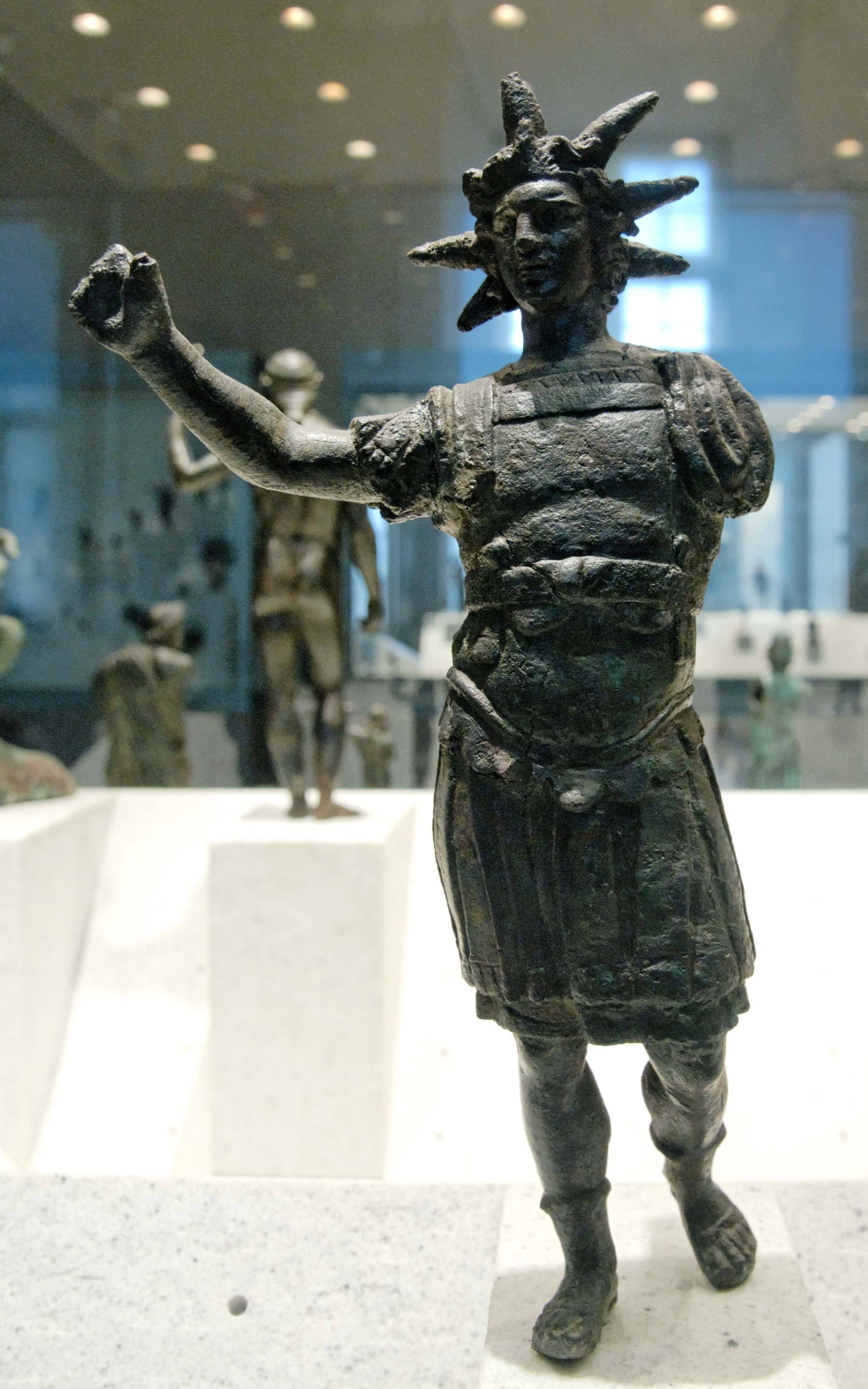
Bronze statuette of Helios with a seven-pointed gloriole and breastplate.

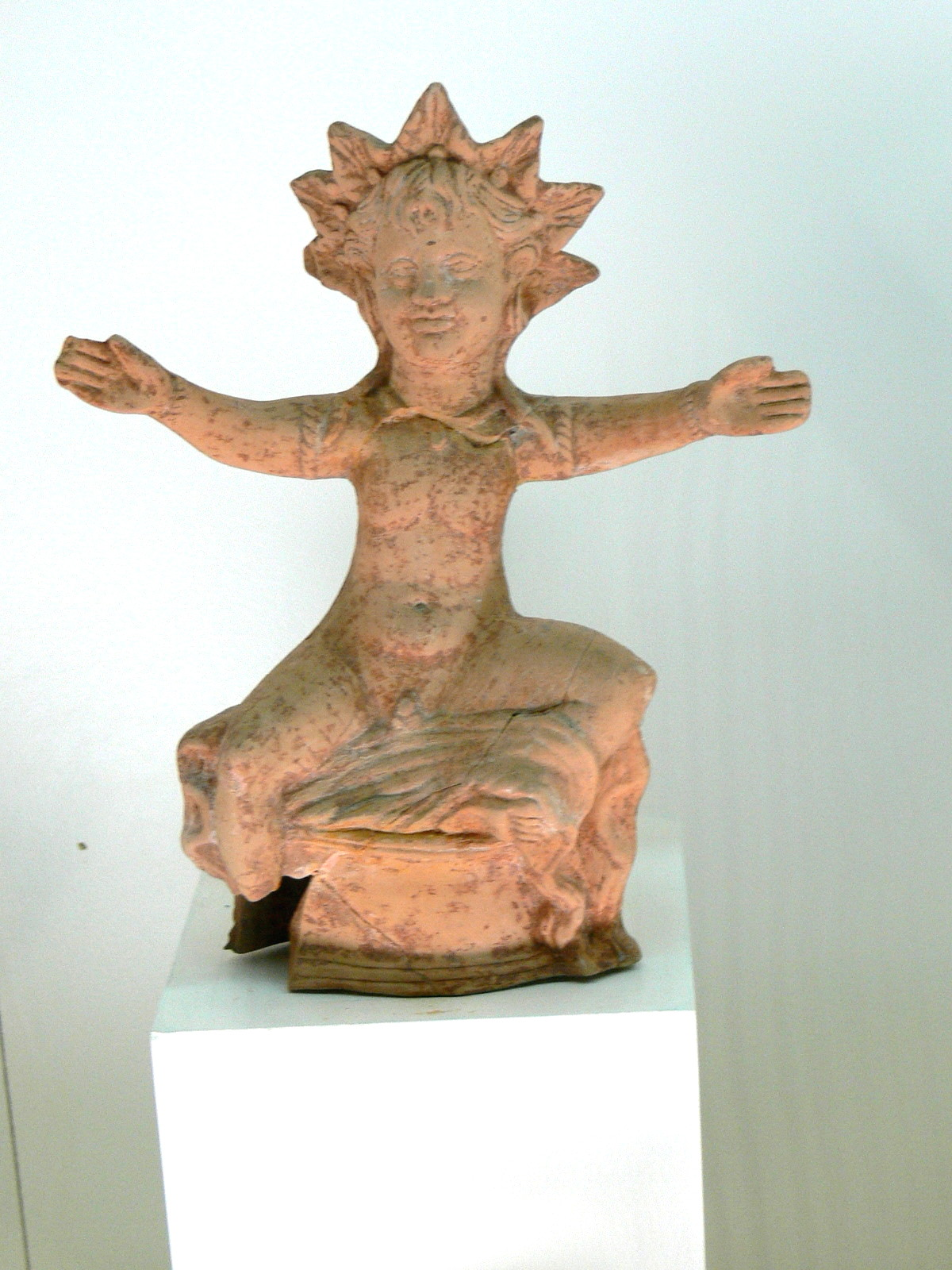
Helios statuette, Antalya Museum.

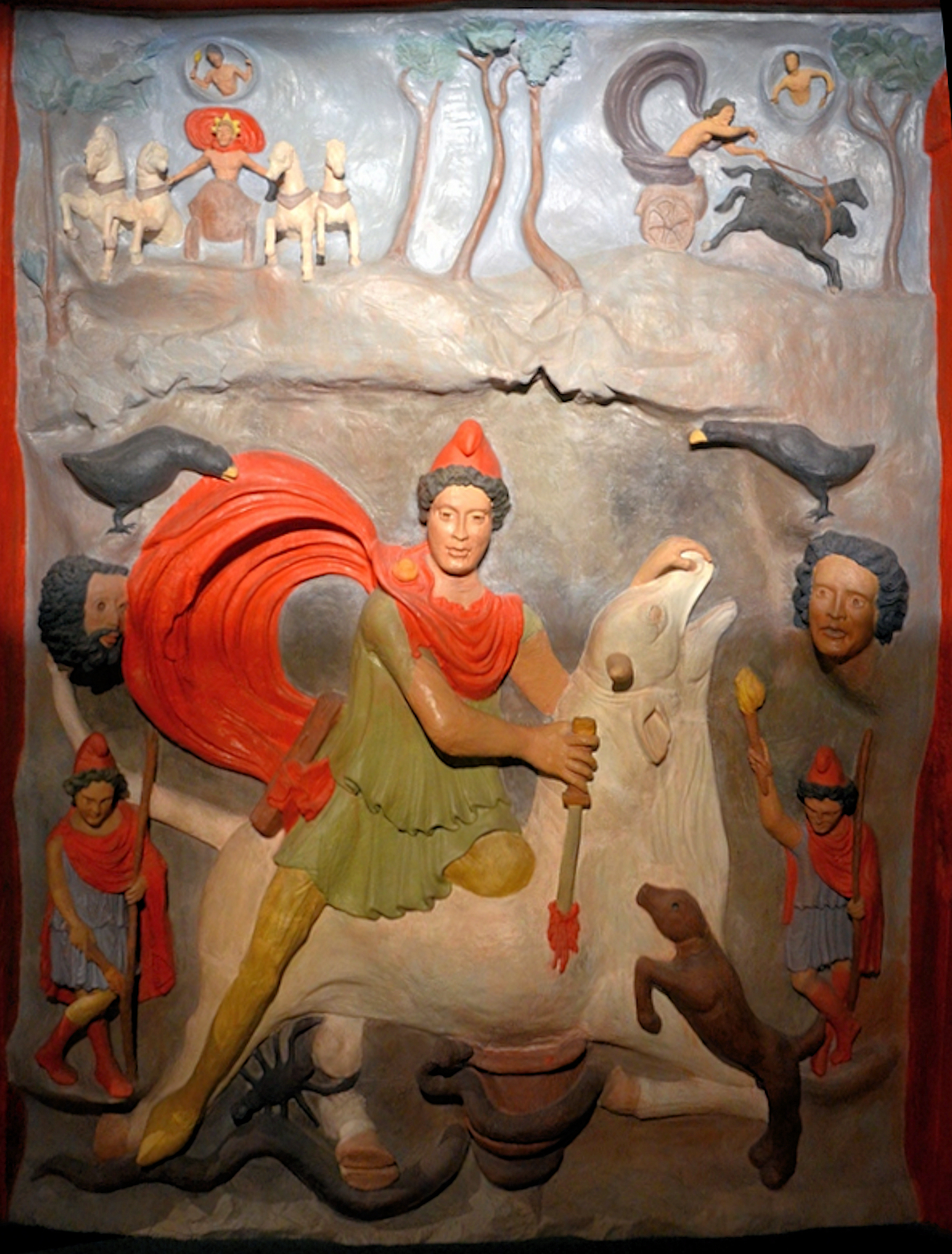
Mithraic relief with original colors (reconstitution).

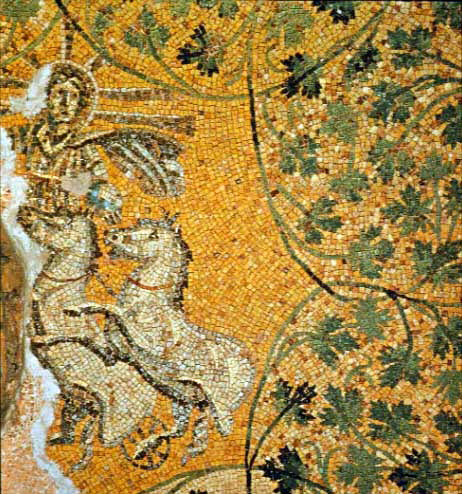
Jesus Christ-Helios mosaic.

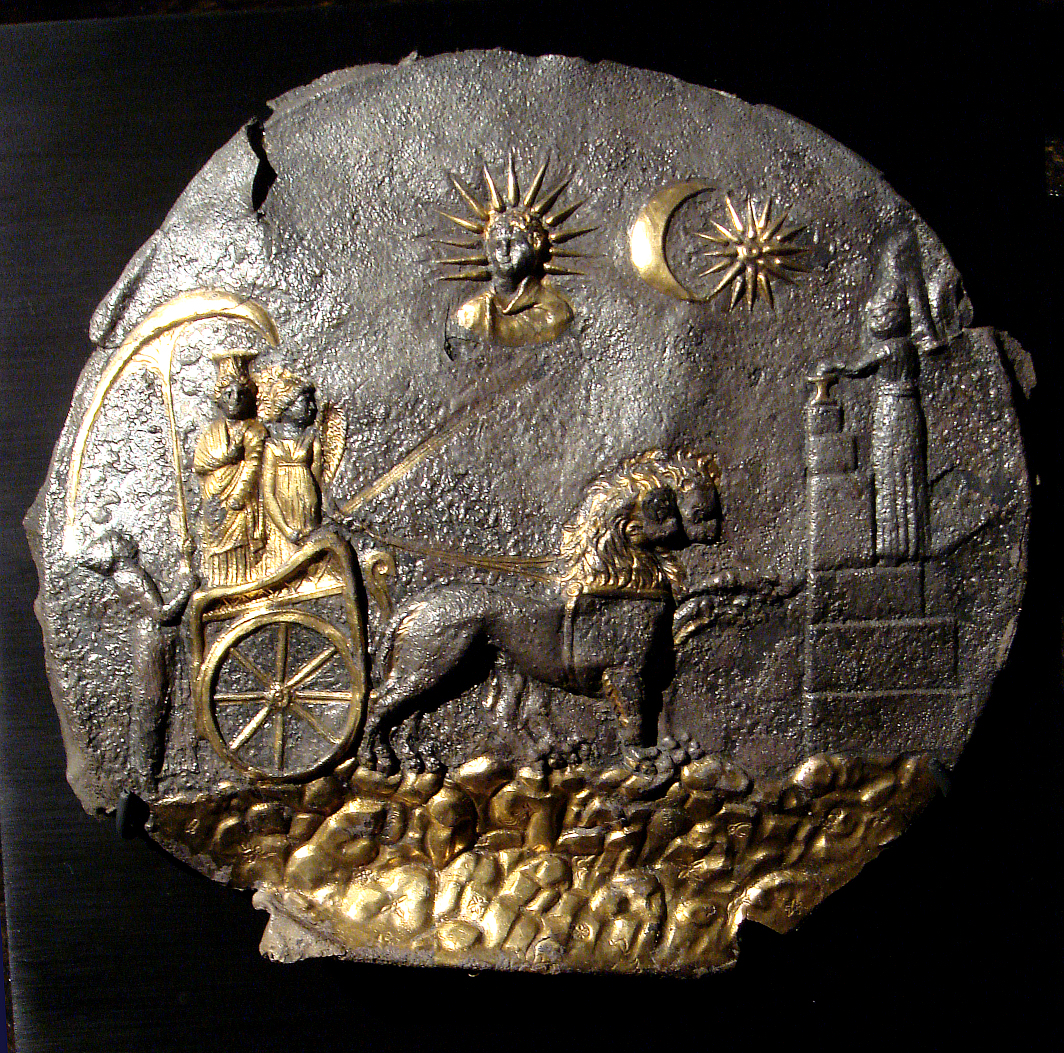
Helios on a plate with Cybele.

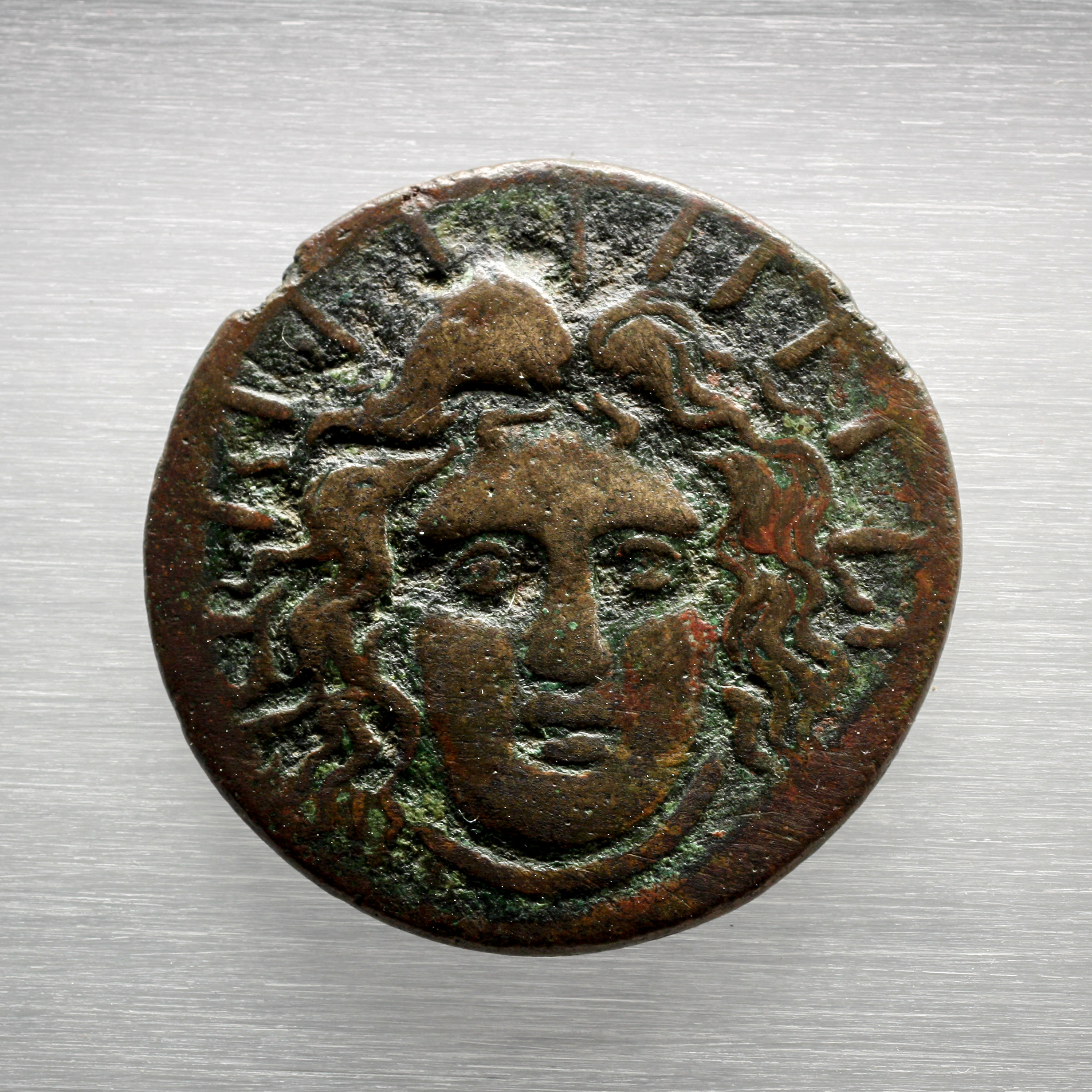
Helios on a Rhodian coin, München, Staatliche Münzsammlung.

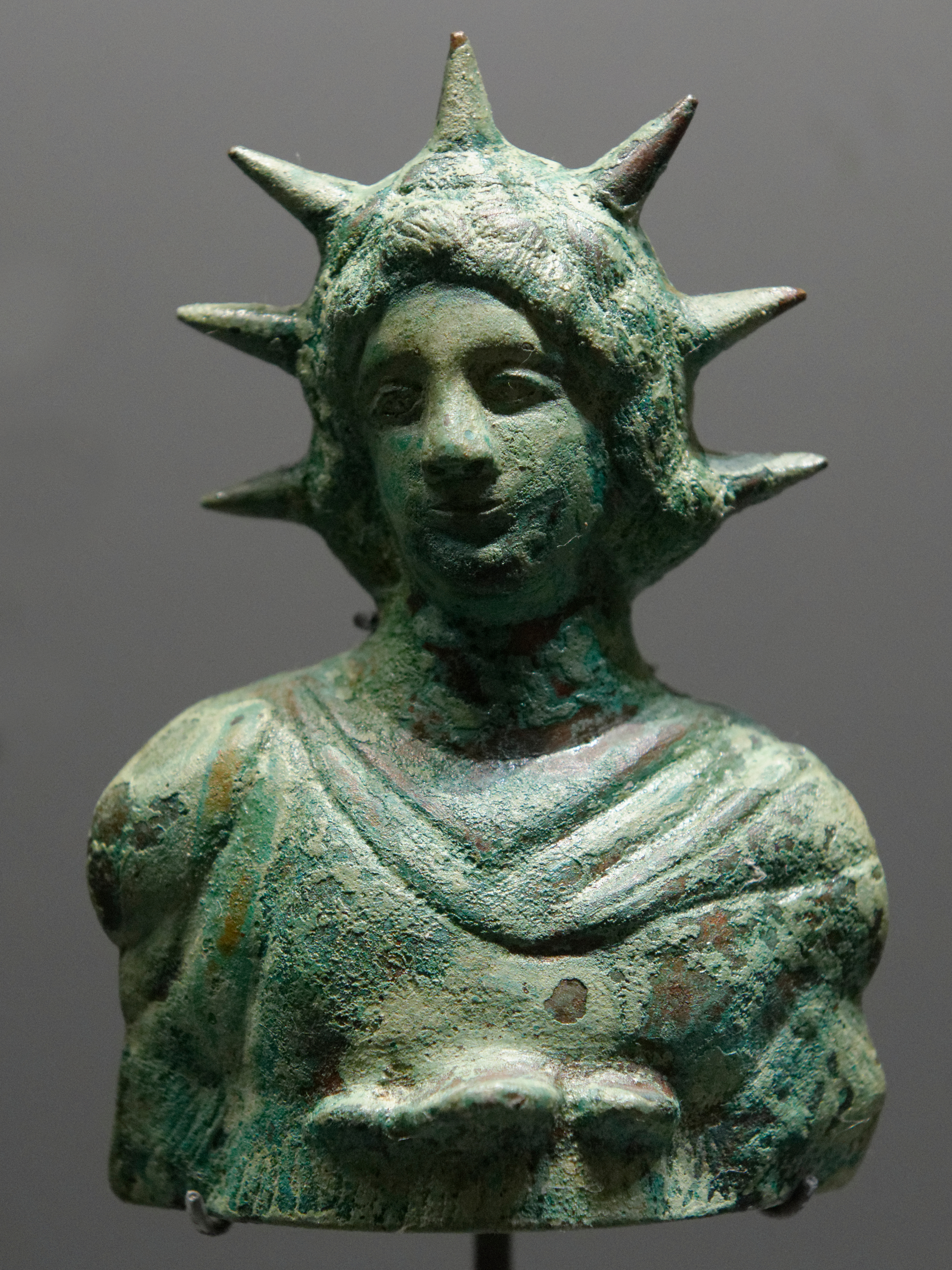
Helios with a chlamys.

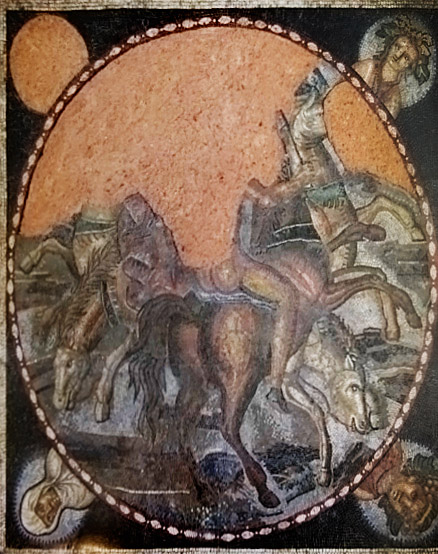
Horses of the Sun, Musée de Sens.

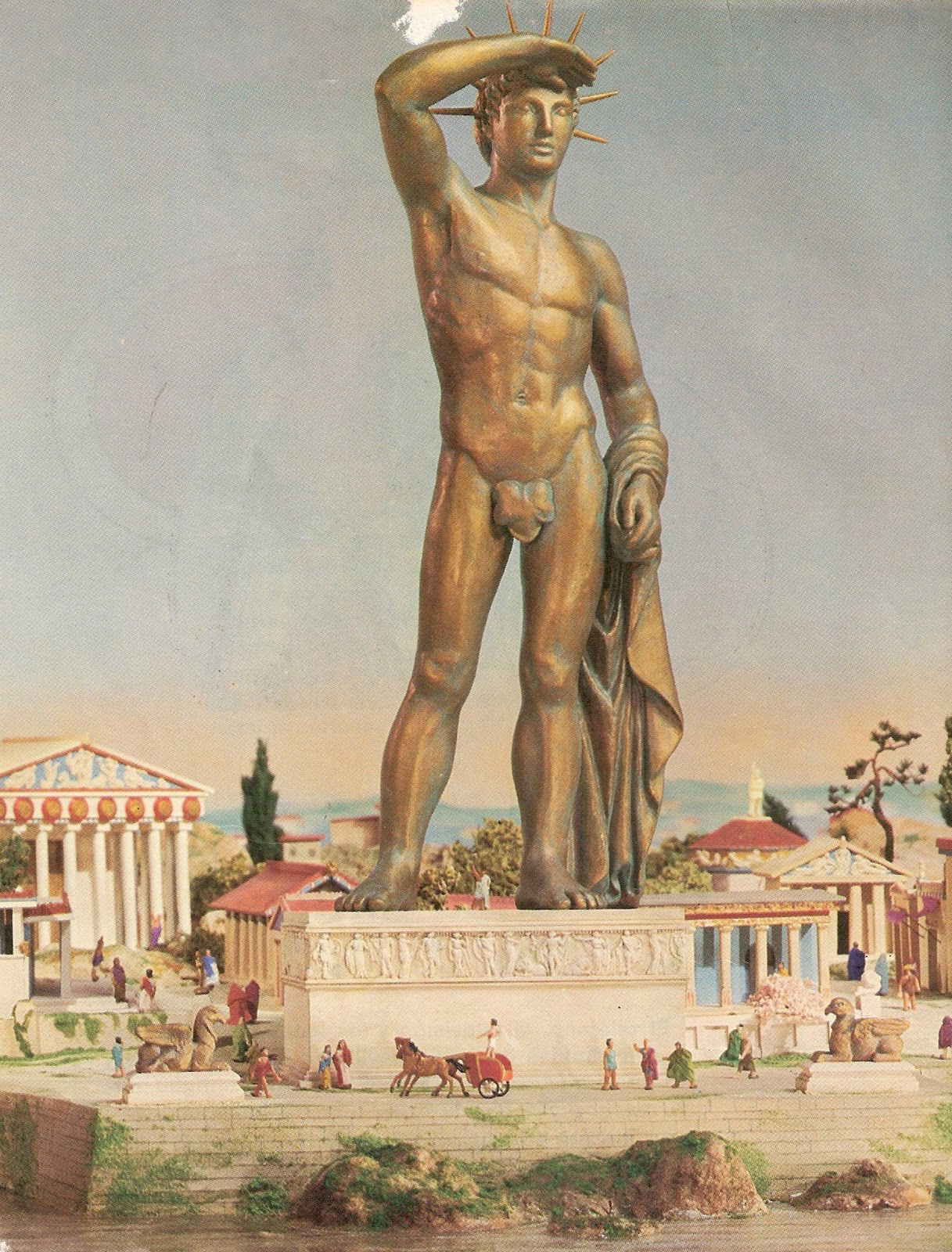
The Colossus of Rhodes.

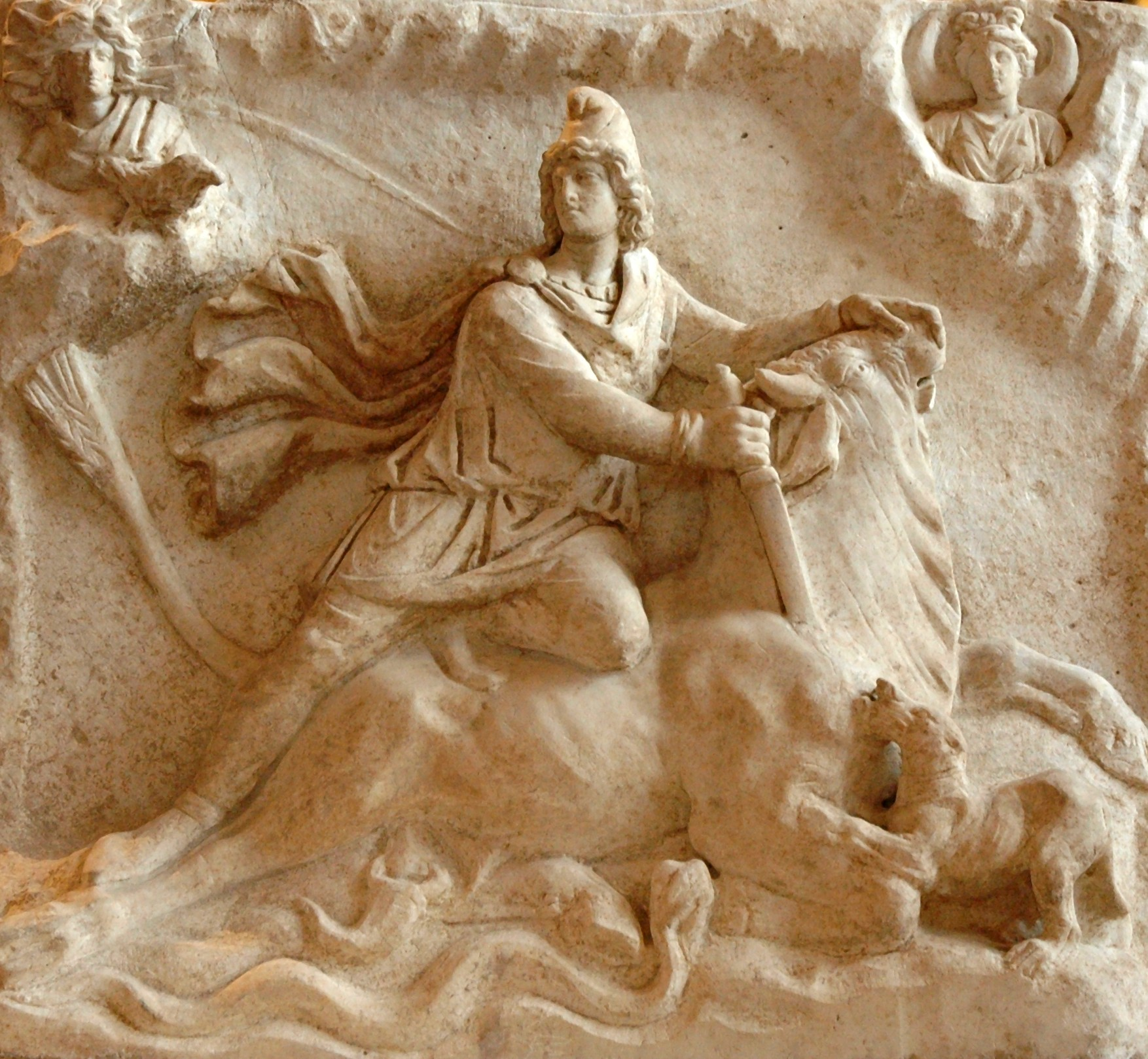
Helios with Selene and Mithras.

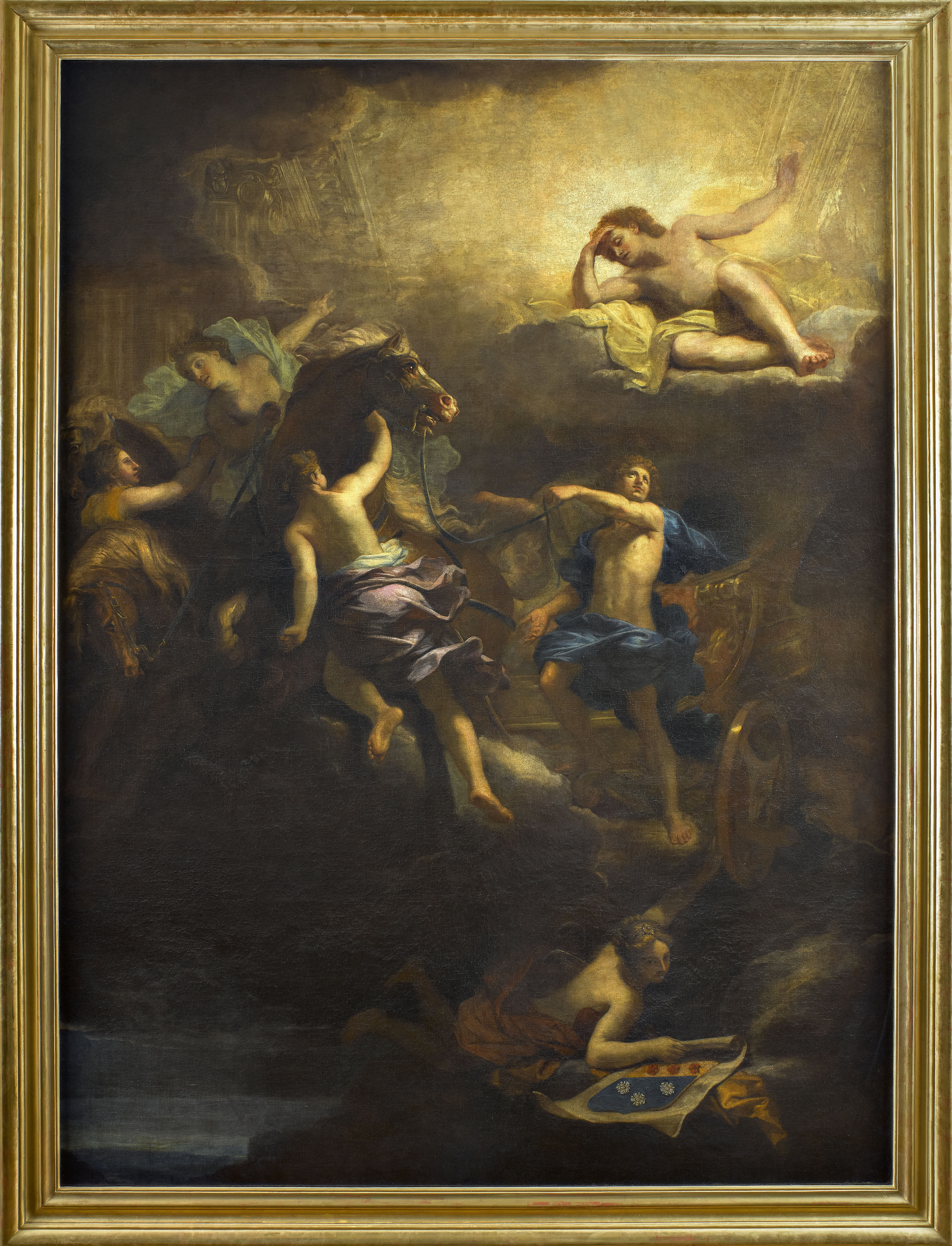
The Departure of Phaethon, Jean Jouvenet, oil on canvas, 1680s.

== Genealogy ==
Helios's family tree, according to Hesiod's Theogony

Uranus	Gaia	Pontus
Oceanus	Tethys	Hyperion	Theia	Crius	Eurybia
The Rivers	Perse	HELIOS	Selene	Eos	Astraeus	Pallas	Perses
The Oceanids	Circe	Aeëtes
Cronus	Rhea	Coeus	Phoebe
Hestia	Hera	Hades	Zeus	Leto	Asteria
Demeter	Poseidon
Iapetus	Clymene (or Asia)	Mnemosyne	(Zeus)	Themis
Atlas	Menoetius	Prometheus	Epimetheus	The Muses	The Horae

== See also ==
- Ah! Sun-flower
- Amaterasu
- Amshuman
- Five Suns (mythology)
- Guaraci
- Heliopolis, particularly
  - Heliopolis in Egypt
  - Heliopolis in Lebanon
- Korouhanba
- Piltzintecuhtli (mythology)
- List of solar deities
- Solar Myths

== Bibliography ==
=== Primary sources ===
- Aelian, On Animals, Volume II: Books 6-11, translated by A. F. Scholfield, Loeb Classical Library No. 450, Cambridge, Massachusetts, Harvard University Press, 1959. Online version at Harvard University Press.
- Aelian, On Animals, Volume III: Books 12-17, translated by A. F. Scholfield, Loeb Classical Library No. 449, Cambridge, Massachusetts, Harvard University Press, 1959. Online version at Harvard University Press. ISBN 978-0-674-99494-2.
- Aeschylus, Fragments. Edited and translated by Alan H. Sommerstein. Loeb Classical Library 505. Cambridge, MA: Harvard University Press, 2009. ISBN 978-0674996298.
- Aeschylus, Persians. Seven Against Thebes. Suppliants. Prometheus Bound. Edited and translated by Alan H. Sommerstein. Loeb Classical Library No. 145. Cambridge, MA: Harvard University Press, 2009. ISBN 978-0-674-99627-4. Online version at Harvard University Press.
- Aesop, Aesop's Fables. A new translation by Laura Gibbs. Oxford University Press (World's Classics): Oxford, 2002. Full text and index available at mythfolklore.net.
- Apollodorus, Apollodorus, The Library, with an English Translation by Sir James George Frazer, F.B.A., F.R.S. in 2 Volumes. Cambridge, MA, Harvard University Press; London, William Heinemann Ltd. 1921. Online version at the Perseus Digital Library.
- Apollonius of Rhodes, Argonautica; with an English translation by R. C. Seaton. William Heinemann, 1912.
- Apollonius Rhodius, The Argonautica of Apollonius Rhodius: Book III, edited with introduction and commentary by Marshall M. Gillies, Cambridge University Press, 1928.
- Archilochus in Elegy and Iambus. with an English Translation by. J. M. Edmonds. Cambridge, MA. Harvard University Press. London. William Heinemann Ltd. 1931. 2. Online text available at Perseus Online Library.
- Aristophanes, Clouds. The Comedies of Aristophanes. William James Hickie. London. Bohn. 1853?.
- Athenaeus, The Learned Banqueters, Volume V: Books 10.420e-11. Edited and translated by S. Douglas Olson. Loeb Classical Library 274. Cambridge, MA: Harvard University Press, 2009.
- Callimachus. Hymns, translated by Alexander William Mair (1875–1928). London: William Heinemann; New York: G.P. Putnam's Sons. 1921. Online version at the Topos Text Project.
- Claudian, Rape of Persephone in Claudian: Volume II. Translated by Platnauer, Maurice. Loeb Classical Library Volume 136. Cambridge, MA. Harvard University Press. 1922.
- Diodorus Siculus, Bibliotheca Historica. Vol 1-2. Immanel Bekker. Ludwig Dindorf. Friedrich Vogel. in aedibus B. G. Teubneri. Leipzig. 1888–1890. Greek text available at the Perseus Digital Library.
- Emperor Julian the Apostate, Against the Galileans: remains of the 3 books, excerpted from Cyril of Alexandria, Contra Julianum, (1923) pp. 319–433, translated by Wilmer Cave Wright, Ph.D.
- Euripides, Fragments: Oedipus-Chrysippus. Other Fragments. Edited and translated by Christopher Collard, Martin Cropp. Loeb Classical Library 506. Cambridge, MA: Harvard University Press, 2009.
- Euripides, Medea translated by Michael Collier and Georgia Machemer, Oxford University Press, 2006, ISBN 978-0-19-514566-3. Google books.
- Euripides, The Complete Greek Drama', edited by Whitney J. Oates and Eugene O'Neill, Jr. in two volumes. .1. Iphigenia in Tauris, translated by Robert Potter. New York. Random House. 1938.
- Euripides, The Complete Greek Drama', edited by Whitney J. Oates and Eugene O'Neill, Jr. in two volumes. 2. The Phoenissae, translated by E. P. Coleridge. New York. Random House. 1938.
- Herodotus, Herodotus, with an English translation by A. D. Godley. Cambridge. Harvard University Press. 1920. Online version available at The Perseus Digital Library.
- Hesiod, Theogony, in The Homeric Hymns and Homerica with an English Translation by Hugh G. Evelyn-White, Cambridge, MA., Harvard University Press; London, William Heinemann Ltd. 1914. Online version at the Perseus Digital Library.
- Hesychius of Alexandria, Alphabetical Collection of All Words: Vol. III (pi through sigma), Vol. IV (tau through omega)
- Homeric Hymn 2 to Demeter in The Homeric Hymns and Homerica with an English Translation by Hugh G. Evelyn-White. Homeric Hymns. Cambridge, Massachusetts, Harvard University Press; London, William Heinemann Ltd. 1914. Online version at the Perseus Digital Library.
- Homeric Hymn 3 to Apollo in The Homeric Hymns and Homerica with an English Translation by Hugh G. Evelyn-White. Homeric Hymns. Cambridge, Massachusetts, Harvard University Press; London, William Heinemann Ltd. 1914. Online version at the Perseus Digital Library.
- Homeric Hymn 4 to Hermes in The Homeric Hymns and Homerica with an English Translation by Hugh G. Evelyn-White. Homeric Hymns. Cambridge, Massachusetts, Harvard University Press; London, William Heinemann Ltd. 1914. Online version at the Perseus Digital Library.
- Homeric Hymn 28 to Athena in The Homeric Hymns and Homerica with an English Translation by Hugh G. Evelyn-White. Homeric Hymns. Cambridge, Massachusetts, Harvard University Press; London, William Heinemann Ltd. 1914. Online version at the Perseus Digital Library.
- Homeric Hymn 31 to Helios in The Homeric Hymns and Homerica with an English Translation by Hugh G. Evelyn-White. Homeric Hymns. Cambridge, Massachusetts, Harvard University Press; London, William Heinemann Ltd. 1914. Online version at the Perseus Digital Library.
- Homer, The Iliad with an English Translation by A.T. Murray, PhD in two volumes. Cambridge, MA., Harvard University Press; London, William Heinemann, Ltd. 1924. Online version at the Perseus Digital Library.
- Homer; The Odyssey with an English Translation by A.T. Murray, PH.D. in two volumes. Cambridge, MA., Harvard University Press; London, William Heinemann, Ltd. 1919. Online version at the Perseus Digital Library.
- Hyginus, Gaius Julius, Astronomica from The Myths of Hyginus translated and edited by Mary Grant. University of Kansas Publications in Humanistic Studies. Online version at the Topos Text Project.
- Hyginus, Gaius Julius, The Myths of Hyginus. Edited and translated by Mary A. Grant, Lawrence: University of Kansas Press, 1960.
- Greek Anthology, with an English Translation by. W. R. Paton. London. William Heinemann Ltd. 1916. 1. Full text available at topostext.org.
- Isthmian odes of Pindar, edited with introduction and commentary by J. B. Bury, M.A., London, Macmillan and Co., 1892.
- Lactantius Placidus, Argumenta in Lateinische Mythographen: Lactantius Placidus, Argumente der Metamorphosen Ovids, erstes heft, Dr. B. Bunte, Bremen, 1852, J. Kühtmann & Comp.
- Libanius, Libanius's Progymnasmata: Model Exercises in Greek Prose Composition and Rhetoric. With a translation and notes by Craig A. Gibson. Society of Biblical Literature, Atalanta. 2008. ISBN 978-1-58983-360-9
- Longinus, On the Sublime, translated into English by H. L. Havell, with an introduction by Andrew Lang, Macmillan Publishers, London, 1890. Online text available here.
- Lucian, Dialogues of the Gods; translated by Fowler, H W and F G. Oxford: The Clarendon Press. 1905.
- Lucian, Dialogues of the Dead. Dialogues of the Sea-Gods. Dialogues of the Gods. Dialogues of the Courtesans, translated by M. D. MacLeod, Loeb Classical Library No. 431, Cambridge, Massachusetts, Harvard University Press, 1961. ISBN 978-0-674-99475-1. Online version at Harvard University Press. Internet Archive.
- Lucian, Icaromenippus in The Downward Journey or The Tyrant. Zeus Catechized. Zeus Rants. The Dream or The Cock. Prometheus. Icaromenippus or The Sky-man. Timon or The Misanthrope. Charon or The Inspectors. Philosophies for Sale. Translated by A. M. Harmon. Loeb Classical Library 54. Cambridge, MA: Harvard University Press, 1915.
- Lucian, Lucian's A True Story: an Intermediate Greek reader, Greek text with running vocabulary and commentary, Evan Hayes, Stephen A. Nimis, 2011. ISBN 0983222800
- Lucian, The Dream or the Cock in The Downward Journey or The Tyrant. Zeus Catechized. Zeus Rants. The Dream or The Cock. Prometheus. Icaromenippus or The Sky-man. Timon or The Misanthrope. Charon or The Inspectors. Philosophies for Sale. Translated by A. M. Harmon. Loeb Classical Library 54. Cambridge, MA: Harvard University Press, 1915.
- Lycophron, Alexandra (or Cassandra) in Callimachus and Lycophron with an English translation by A. W. Mair; Aratus, with an English translation by G. R. Mair, London: W. Heinemann, New York: G. P. Putnam 1921 . Internet Archive
- Maurus Servius Honoratus, In Vergilii carmina comentarii. Servii Grammatici qui feruntur in Vergilii carmina commentarii; recensuerunt Georgius Thilo et Hermannus Hagen. Georgius Thilo. Leipzig. B. G. Teubner. 1881. Online version at the Perseus Digital Library.
- Mesomedes in Lyra Græca: Specimens of the Greek Lyric Poets, from Callinus to Soutsos. Edited, with critical Notes, and a biographical Introduction, by James Donaldson (Edinburgh & London, 1854) p. 96f.
- Nonnus, Dionysiaca; translated by Rouse, W H D, I Books I-XV. Loeb Classical Library No. 344, Cambridge, Massachusetts, Harvard University Press; London, William Heinemann Ltd. 1940. Internet Archive
- Nonnus, Dionysiaca; translated by Rouse, W H D, II Books XVI-XXXV. Loeb Classical Library No. 345, Cambridge, Massachusetts, Harvard University Press; London, William Heinemann Ltd. 1940. Internet Archive
- Nonnus, Dionysiaca; translated by Rouse, W H D, III Books XXXVI–XLVIII. Loeb Classical Library No. 346, Cambridge, Massachusetts, Harvard University Press; London, William Heinemann Ltd. 1940. Internet Archive.
- Orphic Argonautica with a translation by Jason Calavito. Published by Jason Calavito, Albany, New York, 2011. Full text available online at argonauts-book.com.
- Ovid, Fasti: With an English translation by Sir James George Frazer, London: W. Heinemann LTD; Cambridge, Massachusetts, Harvard University Press, 1959. Internet Archive.
- Ovid. Metamorphoses, Volume I: Books 1-8. Translated by Frank Justus Miller. Revised by G. P. Goold. Loeb Classical Library No. 42. Cambridge, Massachusetts: Harvard University Press, 1977, first published 1916. ISBN 978-0-674-99046-3. Online version at Harvard University Press.
- Palaephatus in Early Greek Philosophy, Volume I: Introductory and Reference Materials. Edited and translated by André Laks, Glenn W. Most. Loeb Classical Library 524. Cambridge, MA: Harvard University Press, 2016.
- Palladas, in The Greek Anthology, Volume IV: Book 10: The Hortatory and Admonitory Epigrams. Book 11: The Convivial and Satirical Epigrams. Book 12: Strato's Musa Puerilis. Translated by W. R. Paton. Loeb Classical Library 85. Cambridge, MA: Harvard University Press, 1918.
- Paradoxographoe, by Anton Westermann, Harvard College Library, 1839, London.
- Pausanias, Pausanias Description of Greece with an English Translation by W.H.S. Jones, Litt.D., and H.A. Ormerod, M.A., in 4 Volumes. Cambridge, MA, Harvard University Press; London, William Heinemann Ltd. 1918. Online version at the Perseus Digital Library.
- Philostratus, Imagines, translated by A. Fairbanks, Loeb Classical Library No, 256. Harvard University Press, Cambridge, Massachusetts. 1931. ISBN 978-0674992825. Internet Archive
- Pindar, Odes, Diane Arnson Svarlien. 1990. Online version at the Perseus Digital Library.
- Pindar, The Odes of Pindar including the Principal Fragments with an Introduction and an English Translation by Sir John Sandys, Litt.D., FBA. Cambridge, MA., Harvard University Press; London, William Heinemann Ltd. 1937. Greek text available at the Perseus Digital Library.
- Plato, Laws in Plato in Twelve Volumes, Vols. 10 & 11 translated by R.G. Bury. Cambridge, MA, Harvard University Press; London, William Heinemann Ltd. 1967 & 1968. Online text available at Perseus Digital Library.
- Plato, Plato's statesman: A translation of The Politicus of Plato, with introductory essays and footnotes., & Skemp, J. B. (1952) New Haven: Yale University Press.
- Pliny the Elder, Pliny – Natural History, 10 volumes. Translated by Rackham, H.; Jones, W. H. S.; Eichholz, D. E. Loeb Classical Library. 1938–1962.
- Plutarch, Moralia. 16 vols. (vol. 13: 13.1 & 13.2, vol. 16: index), transl. by Frank Cole Babbitt (vol. 1–5) et al., series: "Loeb Classical Library" (LCL, vols. 197–499). Cambridge, Massachusetts: Harvard University Press et al., 1927–2004.
- Porphyry, On Abstinence From Animal Food in Select works of Porphyry: Containing his four books On abstinence from animal food; his treatise On the Homeric cave of the nymphs; and his Auxiliaries to the perception of intelligible natures. Translated by Thomas Taylor (1823). Several reprints; Prometheus Trust (1994).
- Quintus Smyrnaeus, Quintus Smyrnaeus: The Fall of Troy, translated by A.S. Way, Cambridge, Massachusetts, Harvard University Press, 1913. Internet Archive.
- Scholia Aristophanica; being such comments adscript to the text of Aristophanes as have been preserved in the Codex Ravennas, arr., emended, and translated by Rutherford, William Gunion, 1853–1907, ed. and tr; Biblioteca comunale classense (Ravenna, Italy).
- Seneca, Tragedies, translated by Miller, Frank Justus. Loeb Classical Library Volumes. Cambridge, Massachusetts, Harvard University Press; London, William Heinemann Ltd. 1917.
- Sophocles. Fragments. Edited and translated by Hugh Lloyd-Jones. Loeb Classical Library 483. Cambridge, MA: Harvard University Press, 1996.
- Sophocles, The Ajax of Sophocles. Edited with introduction and notes by Sir Richard Jebb. Sir Richard Jebb. Cambridge. Cambridge University Press, 1893.
- Sophocles, The Oedipus Plays of Sophocles: Oedipus the King, Oedipus at Colonos, Antigone, with a translation by Paul Roche. New York: Plume, 2004.
- Statius, Thebaid. Translated by Mozley, J H. Loeb Classical Library Volumes. Cambridge, Massachusetts, Harvard University Press; London, William Heinemann Ltd. 1928.
- Strabo, The Geography of Strabo. Edition by H.L. Jones. Cambridge, Mass.: Harvard University Press; London: William Heinemann, Ltd. 1924. Online version at the Perseus Digital Library.
- Theocritus in Greek Bucolic Poets. Edited and translated by Neil Hopkinson. Loeb Classical Library 28. Cambridge, MA: Harvard University Press, 1912. Online text available at theoi.com.
- Tzetzes, John, Book of Histories, Book II-IV translated by Gary Berkowitz from the original Greek of T. Kiessling's edition of 1826. Online version available at Theoi.com.
- Tzetzes, John, Chiliades, editor Gottlieb Kiessling, F.C.G. Vogel, 1826. Google Books. (English translation: Book I by Ana Untila; Books II–IV, by Gary Berkowitz; Books V–VI by Konstantino Ramiotis; Books VII–VIII by Vasiliki Dogani; Books IX–X by Jonathan Alexander; Books XII–XIII by Nikolaos Giallousis. Internet Archive).
- Valerius Flaccus, Argonautica translated by Mozley, J H. Loeb Classical Library Volume 286. Cambridge, MA, Harvard University Press; London, William Heinemann Ltd. 1928. Online version at Theoi.com.
- Vergil, Aeneid. Theodore C. Williams. trans. Boston. Houghton Mifflin Co. 1910. Online version at the Perseus Digital Library.
- Xenophon's Ephesian History: or the Love-Adventures of Abrocomas and Anthia, in Five Books''. Translated from the Greek by Mr. Rooke [the Second Edition], London: Printed for J. Millan at Locke's Head in Shug-Lane; 1727, pp. 87–112.

=== Secondary sources ===
- 1742 libretto: Phaeton, Tragedie représentée pour la première fois à Versailles devant le Roi, le mercredi 6 janvier 1683 et à Paris (...) Remise au théâtre le mardi 13 novembre 1742. Paris: Ballard.
- Athanassakis, Apostolos N., and Benjamin M. Wolkow, The Orphic Hymns, Johns Hopkins University Press, 2013) ISBN 978-1-4214-0882-8. Google Books.
- Barnhart, Robert K., The Barnhart Concise Dictionary of Etymology, 1995, HarperCollins, ISBN 978-0062700841.
- Beaulieu, Marie-Claire, The Sea in the Greek Imagination, University of California Press, 2016, ISBN 978-0-8122-4765-7. Google books.
- Beck, Hans, Localism and the Ancient Greek City-State, University of Chicago Press, 2020, ISBN 978-0-226-71134-8. Google books.
- Beekes, Robert S. P. (2009). Etymological Dictionary of Greek. Brill. ISBN 978-90-04-32186-1.
- Bell, Robert E., Women of Classical Mythology: A Biographical Dictionary, ABC-CLIO 1991, ISBN 0-87436-581-3. Internet Archive.
- Berens, E. M., The Myths and Legends of Ancient Greece and Rome, Blackie & Son, Old Bailey, E.C., Glasgow, Endinburgh and Dublin. 1880.
- Bonfant, Larissa, Swaddling, Judith, Etruscan myths. The legendary past. London and Austin, TX: University of Texas Press, 2006. 80 pages : illustrations, map; 25 cm. ISBN 0292706065
- Bortolani, Ljuba Merlina, Magical Hymns from Roman Egypt: A Study of Greek and Egyptian Traditions of Divinity, Cambridge University Press, 2016, ISBN 978-1107108387.
- Boyle, A. J., Seneca: Medea: Edited with Introduction, Translation, and Commentary, Oxford University Press, Oxford, 2014, ISBN 978-0-19-960208-7
- Bull, Malcolm, The Mirror of the Gods, How Renaissance Artists Rediscovered the Pagan Gods, Oxford University Press, 2005, ISBN 978-0195219234.
- Burkert, Walter (1982). Greek Religion.
- Caldwell, Richard, Hesiod's Theogony, Focus Publishing/R. Pullins Company (June 1, 1987). ISBN 978-0-941051-00-2.
- Casson, Lionel, ed. (1962), Selected Satires of Lucian, New York: W.W. Norton & Co, doi:10.4324/9781315129105-4, ISBN 0-393-00443-0
- Chrystal, Paul, War in Greek Mythology, 2020, Pen & Sword Military, ISBN 978-1-52676-616-8.
- Classical Manual: Or a Mythological, Historical and Geographical Commentary on Pope's Homer and Dryden's Aeneid of Virgil, with a Copious Index, London, printed by A. J. Valpy, M. A. For Longman, Rees, Orme, Brown, and Green. 1827.
- Cohen, Beth, White Ground, in The Colors of Clay: Special Techniques in Athenian Vases, Getty Publications, 2006, ISBN 978-0-89236-942-3.
- Collard Christopher, Cropp Martin, Lee Kevin H.; Euripides: Selected Fragmentary Plays: Volume I, Oxbow Books, United Kingdom, 1995, ISBN 978-0-85668-619-1.
- Collignon, Maxime, Manual of Mythology, in Relation to Greek Art, University of Michigan, 1890.
- Collins, Derek, Magic in the Ancient Greek World, Blackwell Publishing, 2008, ISBN 978-1-4051-3238-1.
- Cook, Arthur Bernard, Zeus: A Study in Ancient Religion, Volume I: Zeus God of the Bright Sky, Cambridge University Press 1914. Internet Archive.
- Cosgrove, Denis E. and Cosgrove, Carmen P., Apollo's Eye: A Cartographic Genealogy of the Earth in the Western Imagination, the Johns Hopkins University Press, 2001, ISBN 0-8018-7444-0.
- Davidson, James, "Time and Greek Religion", in A Companion to Greek Religion, edited by Daniel Ogden, John Wiley & Sons, 2010, ISBN 9781444334173.
- Decharme, Paul, Mythologie de la Grèce antique, Garnier Frères, 1884. Google books (in French).
- Detienne, Marcel; Vernant, Jean-Pierre (1989). The Cuisine of Sacrifice Among the Greeks. University of Chicago Press. ISBN 0-226-14351-1.
- Diggle, James, Euripides: Phaethon, Cambridge University Press, Cambridge Classical Texts and Commentaries, Series Number 12, 1970, ISBN 978-0521604246.
- Dillon, Matthew, Girls and Women in Classical Greek Religion, Routledge, 2002, ISBN 0-415-20272-8.
- Dillon, Matthew, Omens and Oracles: Divination in Ancient Greece, Routledge, 2017, ISBN 978-1-4724-2408-2.
- Dunbabin, Katherine M. D., Mosaics of the Greek and Roman World, Cambridge University Press, Edinburgh, 1999, ISBN 978-0-521-00230-1.
- Ekroth, Gunnel, The Sacrificial Rituals of Greek Hero-Cults in the Archaic to the Early Hellenistic Period, Presses universitaires de Liège, 2013, ISBN 9782821829008.
- Fairbanks, Arthur, The Mythology of Greece and Rome. D. Appleton–Century Company, New York, 1907.
- Faita, Antonia-Stella, The Great Altar of Pergamon: The Monument in its Historical and Cultural Context, 2000, University of Bristol. Internet Archive.
- Faraone, Christopher A., Ancient Greek Love Magic, Harvard University Press, 1999, ISBN 0-674-03320-5.
- Faraone, Christopher A. and Obbink, Dirk, Magika Hiera: Ancient Greek Magic and Religion, Oxford University Press, 1991, ISBN 0-19-504450-9.
- Farnell, Lewis Richard, The Cults of the Greek States vol. ΙV, Cambridge University Press, 2010, ISBN 978-1-108-01546-2.
- Farnell, Lewis Richard, The Cults of the Greek States: Volume 5, January 1977, ThriftBooks-Baltimore, ISBN 978-1402192388
- Fear, Andrew T. (June 24, 2022). Mithras. New York City, New York: Routledge publications. pp. 172–173. ISBN 9781138499799.
- Fletcher, Judith, Performing Oaths in Classical Greek Drama, Cambridge University Press 2012, New York, ISBN 978-0-521-76273-1.
- Foley, Helene, The Homeric Hymn to Demeter: Translation, Commentary, and Interpretive Essays, Princeton University Press, Princeton, 1993, ISBN 978-0-691-01479-1.
- Fontenrose, Joseph Eddy (1988). Didyma: Apollo's Oracle, Cult, and Companions. Los Angeles, California: University of California Press. ISBN 0-520-05845-3.
- Fowler, R. L. (2000), Early Greek Mythography: Volume 1: Text and Introduction, Oxford University Press, Oxford, 2000. ISBN 978-0198147404.
- Fowler, R. L. (2013), Early Greek Mythography: Volume 2: Commentary, Oxford University Press, 2013. ISBN 978-0198147411.
- Gantz, Timothy, Early Greek myth: A Guide to Literary and Artistic Sources, 1993, The Johns Hopkins University Press, Baltimore, ISBN 0-8018-4410-X.
- Gantz, Timothy, Early Greek Myth: A Guide to Literary and Artistic Sources, Johns Hopkins University Press, 1996, Two volumes: ISBN 978-0-8018-5360-9 (Vol. 1), ISBN 978-0-8018-5362-3 (Vol. 2).
- Gardner, Percy; Jevons, Frank Byron, A Manual of Greek Antiquities, University of Wisconsin, 1895, Charles Scribner's Sons.
- Gelling, Peter; Davidson Hilda Ellis, Chariot of the Sun and Other Rites and Symbols of the Northern Bronze Age, Aldine Paperbacks, 1972, ISBN 978-0460021081.
- Georgiadou, Aristoula; Larmour, David H. J. (1998), Lucian's Science Fiction Novel True Histories: Interpretation and Commentary, Supplements to Mnemosyne, Leiden, The Netherlands: Brill, doi:10.1163/9789004351509, ISBN 90-04-10667-7
- Grimal, Pierre, The Dictionary of Classical Mythology, Wiley-Blackwell, 1996. ISBN 978-0-631-20102-1.
- de Grummond, Nancy T., From Pergamon to Sperlonga: Sculpture and Context. University of California Press, Los Angeles, United States, 2000. ISBN 0-520-22327-6
- Guillermier Pierre; Koutchmy Serge, Total Eclipses: Science, Observations, Myths and Legends, Praxis Publishing, 1999, ISBN 1-85233-160-7.
- Guthrie, W. K. C., Orpheus and Greek Religion: A Study of the Orphic Movement, Princeton University Press, 1935. ISBN 978-0-691-02499-8. Google books.
- Hamilton, Edith, Mythology. Grand Central Publishing. Chicago. Hamilton, Edith. 2011. Mythology. London, England: Grand Central Publishing.
- Hansen, William F., Handbook of Classical Mythology, ABC-CLIO, Inc. 2004. ISBN 9781576072264.
- Ḥaḵlîlî, Rāḥēl, Ancient Mosaic Pavements: Themes, Issues, and Trends: Selected Studies, Brill Publications, 2009, Boston, ISBN 978-90-04-16754-4.
- Hall, James, Dictionary of Subjects and Symbols in Art, second edition, 2018, Routledge publications, ISBN 978-0-8133-4393-8.
- Hard, Robin, The Routledge Handbook of Greek Mythology: Based on H.J. Rose's "Handbook of Greek Mythology", Psychology Press, 2004, ISBN 9780415186360. Google Books.
- Harrison, Jane Ellen (March 9, 1991). Prolegomena to the Study of Greek Religion. Princeton University Press. ISBN 978-0-691-01514-9.
- Harrison, Juliette, Dreams and Dreaming in the Roman Empire: Cultural Memory and Imagination, 2013, Bloomsbury, ISBN 978-1441176332.
- Harris-Warrick Rebecca, Dance and Drama in French Baroque Opera, Cambridge University Press, 2016, ISBN 978-1-107-13789-9.
- Hart, George (2005). The Routledge Dictionary of Egyptian Gods and Goddesses. Routledge. ISBN 0-415-34495-6.
- Hauptmann, Gerhart, Ährenlese, SAGA Egmont, 1939, ISBN 9788726956436.
- Hemingway, Seán, How to Read Greek Sculpture, published by the Metropolitan Museum of Art, New York City, 2021, ISBN 978-1-58839-723-2.
- Hijmans, Steven E. (2009). Sol: The Sun on the Art and Religions of Rome (PhD). University of Groningen.
- Hunt, Ailsa (September 12, 2016). Reviving Roman Religion: Sacred Trees in the Roman World. Cambridge, UK: Cambridge University Press. ISBN 978-1-107-15354-7.
- Impelluso, Lucia, Gods and Heroes in Art, translated by Thomas Michael Hartmann, 2002 (English translation), Getty Publications for the United States.
- Inman, Thomas, Ancient faiths embodied in ancient names: or, An attempt to trace the religious belief, sacred rites, and holy emblems of certain nations, volume 1, second edition, 1872, Trübner and Co.
- Konaris, Michael D. (2016). The Greek Gods in Modern Scholarship: Interpretation and Belief in Nineteenth and Early Twentieth Century Germany and Britain. Oxford University Press. ISBN 978-0-19-873789-6.
- Keightley, Thomas, The Mythology of Ancient Greece and Italy, second edition considerably enlarged and improved, London, Whittaker and Co., 1838.
- Kerenyi, Karl (1951). "Apollo: The Wind, the Spirit, and the God: Four Studies". The Gods of the Greeks.
- Kerenyi, Karl (1951). "The Sun, the Moon and their Family". The Gods of the Greeks. pp. 190–194. et passim.
- Kilinski, Karl, Greek Myth and Western Art: The Presence of the Past, Cambridge University Press, New York City, 2013, ISBN 978-1-107-01332-2.
- Kirk, Geoffrey S.; Raven, John E.; Schofield, Malcolm (1983). The Presocratic Philosophers: A Critical History with a Selection of Texts (2 ed.). Cambridge: Cambridge University Press. ISBN 0-521-09169-1.
- Knight, Virginia, The Renewal of Epic: Responses to Homer in the Argonautica of Apollonius, Brill Publishers, 1995, ISBN 90-04-10386-4.
- Kraemer, Ross Shepard, When Aseneth Met Joseph: A Late Antique Tale of the Biblical Patriarch and His Egyptian Wife, Reconsidered, Oxford University Press, New York City, 1998, ISBN 0-19-511475-2.
- Kristiansen, Kristian; Larsson, Thomas B. (2005). The Rise of Bronze Age Society: Travels, Transmissions and Transformations. Cambridge University Press. ISBN 0-521-84363-4
- Lalonde, Gerald V., Horos Dios: An Athenian Shrine and Cult of Zeus, Brill Publishers, Boston, 2006, ISBN 90-04-14741-1.
- Larson, Jennifer, A Land Full of Gods: Nature Deities in Greek Religion, In A Companion to Greek Religion, D. Ogden (Ed.), 2007.
- Larson, Jennifer, Ancient Greek Cults: A Guide, Routledge, 2007, ISBN 978-0-415-32448-9.
- Larson, Jennifer Lynn, Greek Heroine Cults, the University of Wisconsin Press, 1995, ISBN 0-299-14370-8.
- Larson, Jennifer, Greek Nymphs: Myth, Cult, Lore, Oxford University Press, 2001, ISBN 0-19-512294-1.
- Lecerf, Adrien, Iamblichus and Julian's "Third Demiurge": A Proposition in Afonasin, Eugene; Dillon, John M. Dillon; Finamore, John, Iamblichus and the Foundations of Late Platonism, Brill Publications, 2012, ISBN 978-90-04-18327-8.
- Le Comte, Edward, Poets' Riddles: Essays in Seventeenth-century Explication, Port Washington, N.Y. : Kennikat Press, 1975.
- Loney, Alexander C., The Ethics of Revenge and the Meanings of the Odyssey, Oxford University Press, 2018, ISBN 978-0-19-090967-3.
- Long, Charlotte R., The Twelve Gods of Greece and Rome with a frontispiece, 101 plates and two maps, Brill Publishers, 1987, ISBN 90-04-07716-2. Google books.
- Lupu, Eran, Greek Sacred Law: A Collection of New Documents (NGSL), Leiden, Brill Publications, Netherlands, 2005, ISBN 90-04-13959-1.
- MacDonald Kirkwood, Gordon, A Short Guide to Classical Mythology. Cornell University. 2000. Bolchazy-Carducci Publishers, Inc.
- Madigan, Brian Christopher, Monumenta Graeca et Romana: Corinthian and Attic vases in the Detroit Institute of Arts, Boston, Brill Publications, 2008. ISBN 978-90-04-16408-6.
- Mallory, J. P.; Adams, D. Q., Encyclopedia of Indo-European Culture, Fitzroy Dearborn Publishers, 1997, ISBN 1-884964-98-2.
- Malkin, Irad, Religion and Colonization in Ancient Greece, 1987, ISBN 978-90-04-29670-1.
- March, Jennifer R., Dictionary of Classical Mythology. Illustrations by Neil Barrett, Cassel & Co., 1998. ISBN 978-1-78297-635-6.
- Mastronarde, Donald J. (2017). Preliminary Studies On the Scholia to Euripides (PDF). Berkeley, California: California Classical Studies. ISBN 9781939926104.
- Matthews, Victor J., Panyassis of Halikarnassos: Text and Commentary, Brill Publications, Leiden, 1974, ISBN 90-04-04001-3.
- Mayerson, Philip, Classical Mythology in Literature, Art, and Music, Focus publishing, R. Pullins Company, 2001. ISBN 9781585100361.
- Meagher, Robert E., The Meaning of Helen: In Search of an Ancient Icon, Bolchazy-Carducci Publishers, 2002. ISBN 9780865165106.
- Meisner, Dwayne A., Orphic Tradition and the Birth of the Gods, Oxford University Press, 2018, ISBN 978-0-19-066352-0.
- Mikalson, Jon D., Honor Thy Gods: Popular Religion in Greek Tragedy, The University of North Carolina Press, 1991, ISBN 978-0-8078-2005-6.
- Miles, Margaret L., Autopsy in Athens: Recent Archaeological Research on Athens and Attica, Oxbow Books, London, 2015, ISBN 978-1-78297-856-5.
- Miller, John F. and Newlands, Carole E., A Handbook to the Reception of Ovid, Wiley Blackwell, 2014, ISBN 978-1-4443-3967-3.
- Miller, Stella G., Two Groups of Thessalian Gold, Volume 18, University of California Press, 1979, ISBN 0-520-09580-4.
- Mitchell, Lucy M., "Sculptures of the Great Pergamon Altar" in The Century Magazine, 1883.
- Morris, Ian, Classical Greece: Ancient Histories and Modern Archaeologies, Cambridge University Press, 1994. ISBN 9780521456784.
- Müller, Karl Wilhelm Ludwig, Fragmenta Historicorum Graecorum, Volume I, 1841. Internet Archive.* Müller, Karl Wilhelm Ludwig, Fragmenta Historicorum Graecorum, Volume I, 1841. Internet Archive.
- Murray, Alexander Stuart; Klapp William H., Handbook of World Mythology, Dover Publications, Inc. Mineola, New York. 2005. ISBN 0-486-44374-4
- Nagy, Gregory, Greek Mythology and Poetics, Cornell University Press, 1990, ISBN 0-8014-8048-5.
- Nawotka, Krzysztof, The Alexander Romance by Ps.-Callisthenes: A Historical Commentary, Brill Publishers, 2017, ISBN 978-90-04-33521-9. Google books.
- Neils, The Parthenon: From Antiquity to the Present, Cambridge University Press, 2005. ISBN 9780521820936.
- Nilsson, Martin, Griechische Feste von religiöser Bedeutung, mit Ausschluss der attischen, 1906. Internet Archive.
- Nilsson, Martin Persson (1950), The Minoan-Mycenaean Religion and Its Survival in Greek Religion (PDF) (second ed.), New York: Biblo & Tannen, ISBN 978-0-8196-0273-2
- Notopoulos, James A., Socrates and the Sun, The Classical Association of the Middle West and South, Inc., 1942.
- Numen: International Review for the History of Religions, vol. 51, no. 4, Brill, 2004, E. Thomassen, M. Despland and G. Benavides. Boston.
- Ogden, Daniel, Greek and Roman Necromancy, 2001, Princeton University Press, ISBN 0-691-00904-X.
- Olderr, Steven, Symbolism: A Comprehensive Dictionary, second edition, McFarland & Company, Inc 2012; United States ISBN 978-0-7864-6955-0.
- Oxford Classical Dictionary, fourth edition, Simon Hornblower and Anthony Spawforth (editors), Oxford University Press, 2012. ISBN 978-0-19-954556-8. Google books.
- Paipetis S. A., Science and Technology in Homeric Epics, University of Patras, 2008, Patras, Greece. ISBN 978-1-4020-8784-4.
- Palagia, Olga, The Pediments of the Parthenon, BRILL, 1998. ISBN 9789004111981.
- Parker, Robert, Polytheism and Society at Athens, Oxford University Press, 2005. ISBN 978-0-19-927483-3.
- Parvopassu, Clelia, Phaéton, in Gelli, Piero & Poletti, Filippo (ed), Dizionario dell'opera 2008, Milan, Baldini Castoldi Dalai, 2007, ISBN 978-88-6073-184-5.
- Patton, Kimberley Christine, Religion of the Gods: Ritual, Paradox, and Reflexivity, Oxford University Press, USA, 2009.
- Penglase, Charles (1994). Greek Myths and Mesopotamia: Parallels and Influence in the Homeric Hymns and Hesiod. New York City, New York: Routledge. ISBN 978-0-415-15706-3.
- Picón, Carlos A.; Hemingway, Seán, Pergamon and the Hellenistic Kingdoms of the Ancient World, Yale University Press, 2016, ISBN 978-1-58839-587-0.
- Platt, Verity; Squire, Michael, The Frame in Classical Art: A Cultural History, Cambridge University Press, 2017, ISBN 978-1-107-16236-5.
- Powell, Barry B., Greek Poems to the Gods: Hymns from Homer to Proclus, University of California Press, 2021, ISBN 978-0520302877.
- Powell, John Scott, Music and Theatre in France, 1600-1680, Oxford University Press, 2000.
- Rahner, Hugo, Greek Myths and Christian Mystery, Biblo-Moser, June 1, 1963, ISBN 978-0819602701.
- Ridgeway, Brunilde Sismondo, Hellenistic Sculpture II: The Styles of ca. 200–100 B.C., The University of Wisconsin Press, 2000.
- Riggs, Christina, The Oxford Handbook of Roman Egypt, Oxford University Press, 2012, ISBN 978-0-19-957145-1.
- Roberts, Helene E., Encyclopedia of Comparative Iconography: Themes Depicted in Works of Art. Volume I and II, Fitzroy Dearborn Publishers, London, Chicago, 1998. ISBN 1-57958-009-2.
- Robertson, Martin (1981), A Shorter History of Greek Art, Cambridge University Press. ISBN 9780521280846.
- Robertson, Martin (1992), The Art of Vase-Painting in Classical Athens, Cambridge University Press. ISBN 9780521338813.
- Roisman, Joseph; Worthington, Ian, A Companion to Ancient Macedonia, Blackwell Companions to the Ancient World, Wiley-Blackwell, 2010, ISBN 978-1405179362. Google books.
- Rose, H. J., A Handbook of Greek Mythology, Methuen and Co. Ltd. London and New York, 1928. ISBN 0-203-42176-0
- Roscher, Wilhelm Heinrich, Ausführliches Lexikon der griechischen und römischen Mythologie (Leipzig: Teubner, 1890–94), Volume II, part 1.
- Rutherford, Ian, Pindar's Paeans: A Reading of the Fragments with a Survey of the Genre, Oxford University Press, New York, 2001. ISBN 0-19-814381-8.
- Salatino, Kevin; Folds, Suzanne, Gray Collection: Pure Drawing, 2020, the Art Institute of Chicago, ISBN 978-0-300-25080-0.
- Sanders, Ed; Thumiger, Chiara; Carey, Christopher; Lowe, Nick J. (2013). Erôs in Ancient Greece. Oxford University Press. ISBN 978-0-19-960550-7.
- Savignoni, L. 1899. "On Representations of Helios and of Selene." The Journal of Hellenic Studies 19: pp. 265–272
- Schauenburg, Konrad (1955). Helios: Archäologisch-mythologische Studien über den antiken. Mann.
- Seaton, Beverly, The Language of Flowers: A History, University Press of Virginia, 1995, ISBN 0-8139-1556-2.Google books.
- Seydle, Jon L., Giambattista Tiepolo: Fifteen Oil Sketches, 2005, Getty Publications, ISBN 978-0-89236-812-9.
- Seyffert, Oskar, A Dictionary of Classical Antiquities, Mythology, Religion, Literature and Art, from the German of Dr. Oskar Seyffert, S. Sonnenschein, 1901. Internet Archive.
- Smith, Helaine L., Masterpieces of Classic Greek Drama, Greenwood Press, 2006, ISBN 0-313-33268-1.
- Smith, William; Dictionary of Greek and Roman Biography and Mythology, London (1873)."Helios".
- Sommerstein, Alan H.; Bayliss, Andrew James, Oath and State in Ancient Greece, Walter de Gruyter publications, Berlin, 2013, ISBN 978-3-11-028438-6.
- Steinberg, Aliza, Weaving in Stones: Garments and Their Accessories in the Mosaic Art of Eretz Israel in Late Antiquity, Archaeopress Publishing, 2020, ISBN 978-1-78969-321-8.
- Stoneman, Richard; Erickson, Kyle; Netton, Ian Richard, The Alexander Romance in Persia and the East, 2012, ISBN 9789491431043.
- Stoneman, Richard, Greek Mythology: An Encyclopedia of Myth and Legend, Diamond Books, 1995.
- Stoll, Heinrich Wilhelm, Handbook of the religion and mythology of the Greeks, With a Short Account of The Religious System of the Romans, tr. by R.B. Paul, and ed. by T.K. Arnold, London, Francis & John Rivington, 1852.
- Stuttard, David (2016). Greek Mythology: A Traveler's Guide. London and New York: Thames and Hudson. ISBN 978-0500518328.
- The Classical Review, volume VII, University of Illinois Library, 1893.
- The Nineteenth Century, Volume 17, edited by James Knowles, January–June 1885, London, Harvard College Library.
- Thonemann, Peter, An Ancient Dream Manual: Artemidorus' The Interpretation of Dreams, Oxford University Press, 2020, ISBN 978-0-19-884382-5.
- Toorn, Karel van der; Becking, Bob; Horst, Pieter Willem van der, eds. (1999), Dictionary of Deities and Demons in the Bible, 2nd ed., Grand Rapids: Wm. B. Eerdmans Publishing, pp. 394–401.
- Torr, Cecil, Rhodes in Ancient Times, Cambridge University Press, 1885.
- Tsagalis, Christos, Early Greek Epic Fragments I: Antiquarian and Genealogical Epic De Gruyter, 2017, ISBN 978-3-11-053153-4.
- Usener, Herman, Göttliche Synonyme in Kleine Schriften, Cambridge University Press, 2010, ISBN 978-1-108-01726-8. Google books.
- Ustinova, Yulia (2009). Caves and the Ancient Greek Mind: Descending Underground in the Search for Ultimate Truth. New York City, New York: Oxford University Press. ISBN 978-0-19-954856-9.
- van den Berg, Robbert Maarten, Proclus' Hymns: Essays, Translations, Commentary, 2001, ISBN 90-04-12236-2.
- Vergados, Athanassios, The "Homeric Hymn to Hermes": Introduction, Text and Commentary, Walter de Gruyter, 2012. ISBN 9783110259704.
- Vermaseren, M. J, Graecia atque Insulae, Brill Publications, Leiden, 1982, ISBN 90-04-05399-9.
- Versnel, H. S., Inconsistencies in Greek and Roman Religion: Transition and Reversal in Myth and Ritual: Volume 1: Ter Unus. Isis, Dionysos, Hermes. Three Studies in Henotheism, Brill Publications, 2015, ISBN 90-04-09266-8.
- Walters, Henry Beauchamp, History of ancient pottery, Greek, Etruscan, and Roman volume II, based on the work of Samuel Birch, 1905, London, J. Murray, New York.
- Walton, Alice, The Cult of Asclepius, Ginn and Company, 1894.
- Warrior, Valerie M., Greek Religion: A Sourcebook, 2009, ISBN 978-1-58510-031-6.
- Waterfield, Robin, The Greek Myths: Stories of the Greek Gods and Heroes Vividly Retold, 2011, Quercus, ISBN 9780857382887. Online text available at Internet Archive.
- West, M. L., Indo-European Poetry and Myth, Oxford University Press, 2007. ISBN 978-0-19-928075-9. Google Books.
- Xenis, Georgios A., Scholia vetera in Sophoclis "Oedipum Coloneum", De Gruyter, 2018. ISBN 978-3-11-044733-0.
- Zucker, Arnaud; Le Feuvre, Claire, Ancient and Medieval Greek Etymology: Theory and Practice I, De Gruyter, ISBN 978-3-11-071487-6.
- Κακριδής, Ιωάννης Θ.; Ρούσσος, Ε. Ν.; Παπαχατζής, Νικόλαος; Καμαρέττα, Αικατερίνη; Σκιαδάς, Αριστόξενος Δ. (1986). Ελληνική Μυθολογία: Οι Θεοί, τόμος 1, μέρος Β΄. Athens: Εκδοτική Αθηνών. p. 228. ISBN 978-618-5129-48-4.
