= Cercaphus (Heliadae) =

Greek mythological figure

In Greek mythology, King Cercaphus (Ancient Greek: Κέρκαφος, romanized: Kérkaphos) of Rhodes was one of the Heliadae, sons of Helios and Rhodos, personification of the island.

== Mythology ==
Cercaphus and his brothers Ochimus, Tenages, Macareus, Actis, Triopas, Candalus (Nonnus adds Auges and Thrinax) surpassed all other men as astrologers and seafarers. The most highly endowed of them, Tenages was killed by Macareus, Actis, Triopas and Candalus who were envious of him. When their treacherous act became known, these four murderers took flight to other lands and established themselves as kings and founders there.

The remaining two who had no hand in the murder, Cercaphus and Ochimus, stayed at the island of Rhodes and made their homes in the territory of Ialysus, where they founded the city of Achaea. There Ochimus being the eldest of the seven became the king. Cercaphus married his niece Cydippe (also known as Cyrbia or Lysippe), daughter of Ochimus and Hegetoria, and subsequently inherited the island. According to an alternate version, because of his love for the maiden who was already engaged by Ochimus to Ocridion, Cercaphus persuaded the herald (for it used to be the custom to use heralds to fetch the brides) to bring Cydippê to him when he received her. When this had been accomplished, Cercaphus kidnapped the girl and did not return her until Ochimus had grown old.

After the death of Cercaphus, his three sons by Cydippe: Lindus, Ialysus and Camirus succeeded to the supreme power. During their lifetime there came a great devastating deluge, in which their mother Cydippe was buried beneath the flood and laid waste. Later on, they divided the island among themselves, and each founded a city they named after themselves (modern Lindus, Ialysos and Kameiros).
