= Rhodos =

Oceanid of Greek mythology

- Goddess of Rhodes
- Abode: Rhodes
- Symbol: rose

Genealogy
- Parents: Poseidon (father); Aphrodite, Amphitrite or Halia (mother)
- Consort: Helios
- Children: Actis, Candalus, Cercaphus, Electryone, Macareus, Ochimus, Tenages and Triopas

In Greek mythology, Rhodos or Rhodus (Ancient Greek: Ῥόδος, romanized: Rhódos) or Rhode (Ancient Greek: Ῥόδη, romanized: Rhódē or Rhodē, lit. 'rose' or 'where roses grow'), was the goddess and personification of the island of Rhodes and a wife of the sun god Helios.

== Family ==
Various parents were given for Rhodos. Pindar makes her a daughter of Aphrodite with no father mentioned, although scholia on Pindar add Poseidon as the father; for Herodorus of Heraclea she was the daughter of Aphrodite and Poseidon, while according to Diodorus Siculus she was the daughter of Poseidon and Halia, one of the Telchines, the original rulers of Rhodes. According to Apollodorus (referring to her as "Rhode") she was a daughter of Poseidon and Amphitrite, and full sister to Triton. However, for Epimenides, her father was Oceanus, while according to a scholion on Odyssey 17.208 (calling her "Rhode"), her father was the river-god Asopus. Perhaps misreading Pindar, Asclepiades ("presumably the mythographer" Asclepiades of Tragilus) gives her father as Helios.

Rhode together with Helios or Poseidon were the ancestors of Ialysus, Cameirus and Lindus, eponyms of the cities of Rhodes.

== Mythology ==
The poet Pindar tells the story, that when the gods drew lots for the places of the earth, Helios being absent received nothing. He complained to Zeus about it, who offered to make the division again. Helios refused, for he had seen a new island about to rise from the sea. So Helios, with Zeus' consent, claimed a new island (Rhodes), which had not yet risen from the sea. And after it rose from the sea he lay with her and produced seven sons. According to another source, it was Helios himself who caused the water overflowing the island to disappear, and after that he named this island "Rhodes" after Rhodos.

By Helios, Rhodos was the mother of the Heliadae, who succeeded the Telchines as rulers of Rhodes. According to Pindar, Rhodos had, by Helios, seven sons. Pindar does not name the sons, but according to Diodorus Siculus, the Heliadae were Ochimus, Cercaphus, Actis, Macar (i.e. Macareus), Candalus, Triopas, and Tenages. Diodorus Siculus also says that Helios and Rhodos had one daughter, Electryone. A scholion to Pindar gives the same list of sons, with Macareus (for Macar) and naming the last Heliadae as Phaethon, "the younger, whom the Rhodians call Tenages". The older Phaethon referred to here probably being the famous Phaethon (whose story is told by Ovid) who drove Helios' chariot. The scholion on Odyssey 17.208 (perhaps drawing on either of the lost tragedies Heliades (Daughters of Helios) by Aeschylus, and Phaethon, by Euripides), also makes Rhodos the mother, by Helios, of this famous Phaethon, as well as three daughters: Lampetie, Aigle, and Phaethousa. (In the Odyssey, Lampetie and Phaethousa, the shepherds of Helios' cattle and sheep on Thrinacia, are instead the daughters of Helios by Neaera.)

When Aphrodite cursed Helios and made him fall in love with a mortal princess named Leucothoe, he is said to have forgotten about Rhodos, among other lovers.

== Culture ==
While Rhodian coins were known for displaying the magnificent head of Helios, some of them showed the head of Rhodos; additionally, the rose (Greek rhodon) became the island's symbol. During the Hellenistic period, she was worshipped in Rhodes as the island's tutelary goddess.
