= De Saint-Gelais =

De Saint-Gelais can refer to:

- Anne-Armande de Crequy
- Mellin de Saint-Gelais
- Octavien de Saint-Gelais

== See also ==
- Saint-Gelais
