= Cydippe =

The name Cydippe (Ancient Greek: Κυδίππη, romanized: Kudíppē, lit. 'having divine glory' or 'famed for glory') is attributed to four individuals in Greek mythology.

- Cydippe, one of the 50 Nereids, sea-nymph daughters of the 'Old Man of the Sea' Nereus and the Oceanid Doris. She was in the train of Cyrene along with her sisters.
- Cydippe, also called Cyrbia or Lysippe, the daughter of the nymph Hegetoria and Ochimus, king of Rhodes. She married her paternal uncle, Cercaphus, who inherited the island.
- Cydippe, mother of Cleobis and Biton.
- Cydippe, an Athenian or Naxian maiden. During a festival of Apollo or Artemis in Delos, the enamoured Acontius threw an apple at her feet. Cydippe picked the apple and read out loud the words he had inscribed on it, 'By Artemis I will marry Acontius'. She ignored the event, but afterward when she was about to get married she would fall gravely ill every time she entered the bridechamber, causing the wedding to be postponed several times. Eventually her father consulted the oracle of Delphi, which revealed that Artemis was punishing Cydippe for breaking her vow to Acontius. Thus Cydippe married Acontius and became the ancestor of the legendary Acontiadae tribe.
