= Lindus (mythology) =

Mythological Rhodian man

In Greek mythology, Lindus (Ancient Greek: Λίνδος, romanized: Líndos) was the eponymous founder of Lindus in Rhodes. He was the son of the Rhodian king, Cercaphus, one of the Heliades, and his niece Cydippe, daughter of Ochimus, also a former king. He had two brothers, Camirus and Ialysos who was the eldest.

== Mythology ==
Lindos and his brothers succeeded to the throne after their father's death. During their time, the great deluge came in which their mother Cydippe, who was now named as Cyrbê (or Cyrbia), was buried beneath the flood and laid waste. Later on, they parted the land among themselves, and each of them founded a city which bore his name.

== See also ==
- Telchines
