= Ctesylla =

Daughter of Alcidamas in Greek mythology

In Greek mythology, Ctesylla (Ancient Greek: Κτήσυλλα, romanized: Ktḗsulla) was a maiden of Ioulis in Ceos, daughter of Alcidamas.

== Mythology ==
During the Pythian festival, an Athenian named Hermochares saw Ctesylla dancing in front of the altar of Apollo and fell in love with her. He threw an apple at her feet on which the text of an oath by Artemis' name was carved; Ctesylla picked it up and read the text aloud, which automatically obliged her to marry Hermochares. She became upset about that, but when Hermochares came to her father and wooed her, Alcidamas consented and swore by the name of Apollo that he would marry Ctesylla to Hermochares.

As soon as the festival was over, Alcidamas forgot his oath and was planning to give Ctesylla in marriage to another man. Hermochares rushed to the temple of Artemis where Ctesylla was performing the customary sacrifices. In accord with the goddess' will, Ctesylla fell in love with Hermochares at the first sight and ran off with him to Athens, where they got married.

However, in retribution for Alcidamas having broken his oath, Ctesylla died in labour. During the funeral ceremony, a dove flew up from her death-bed, and the body of Ctesylla disappeared. Hermochares consulted an oracle about that and was advised to found a sanctuary dedicated to Ctesylla. He reported this to the people of Ceos; since then at Ioulis, sacrifices were offered to Aphrodite Ctesylla, whereas in the other parts of Ceos, Ctesylla was a surname of Artemis.

The story of Ctesylla and Hermochares parallels that of Cydippe and Acontius.

== See also ==
- List of Greek deities
- Rachel
