= Electryone (disambiguation) =

Electryone may refer to:

- Electryone, a daughter of Helios
- Electryone, a patronymic for Alcmene a daughter of Electryon and the mother of Heracles
