= Oeae =

Ancient town in Rhodes, Greece

Oeae or Oiai (Ancient Greek: Οἶαι) was an ancient town on the island of Rhodes. It was a member of the Delian League since it is mentioned in the records of tributes to ancient Athens for 454/3 BCE, when it paid a phoros of 3,300 drachmae. It is also mentioned in an inscription dated to the first century BCE.

Its site is unlocated, but it has been suggested to be in the territory of Lindus.
