= Cydippe (Rhodes) =

Rhodian princess in Greek mythology

In Greek mythology, Cydippe (Ancient Greek: Κυδίππη, romanized: Kudíppē) also called Cyrbia (Ancient Greek: Κυρβία, romanized: Kurbía) is a Rhodian princess, daughter of king Ochimus and the nymph Hegetoria. Cydippe eventually married her uncle Cercaphus and became queen of Rhodes, an island in the southeast Aegean Sea. She and Cercaphus had three sons together, Cameirus, Ialysus, and Lindus, founders of ancient Rhodian cities.

== Family ==
Cydippe was the daughter the nymph Hegetoria and Ochimus, king of Rhodes and one of the legendary Heliadae (the seven sons of the sun-god Helios by the sea nymph Rhodos). In some authors she was also called Lysippe.

== Mythology ==
The princess Cydippe was engaged by her father to a man named Ocridion and was about to marry him. But secretly from the rest of the Rhodians, her paternal uncle Cercaphus had fallen in love with her and deviced a plan to be with her. When time arrived for the wedding, the herald came to fetch Cydippe, but instead of delivering her to her rightful husband-to-be Ocridion, he took her to Cercaphus as agreed; this was the reason why heralds where not allowed into the shrine of Ocridion afterwards. Cercaphus then fled with his new bride Cydippe, and only returned home when Ochimus had grown old. When he eventually died, Cercaphus inherited his brother's throne, and Cydippe became queen.

Cydippe, who later changed her name to Cyrbia, bore her uncle three sons; Cameirus, Ialysus, and Lindus, each of which founded a Rhodian city they named after themselves (Camirus, Ialysus and Lindos respectively).

== Background ==
In antiquity Achaia, the primeval Rhodian city that was founded by Cercaphus and Ochimus, was also called Kyrba or Kyrbe. The Kyrb- root also appears in placenames and people in Crete. According to Diodorus Siculus, a great deluge struck Rhodes, and thus Cyrbe was buried beneath the flood and laid waste.

It is known that Cydippe was the subject of one of the paintings of renowned ancient Carian-born Rhodian artist Protogenes.

== See also ==
Other kidnapped people in Greek mythology:

- Persephone
- Helen of Troy
- Chrysippus of Elis
- Cleothera
- Odatis

== Bibliography ==
- Avery, Catherine B., ed. (1962). New Century Classical Handbook. New York, US: Appleton-Century-Crofts.
- Bell, Robert E. (1991). Women of Classical Mythology: A Biographical Dictionary. ABC-Clio. ISBN 9780874365818.
- Diodorus Siculus, Library of History, Volume III: Books 4.59-8, translated by C. H. Oldfather, Loeb Classical Library No. 340. Cambridge, Massachusetts, Harvard University Press, 1939. ISBN 978-0-674-99375-4. Online version at Harvard University Press. Online version by Bill Thayer.
- Fowler, Robert L. (2000). Early Greek Mythography. Vol. 2: Commentary. Oxford, UK: Oxford University Press. ISBN 978-0-19-814741-1.
- Grimal, Pierre (1987). The Dictionary of Classical Mythology. Wiley-Blackwell. ISBN 0-631-13209-0.
- Heinze, Theodor (October 1, 2006). "Cydippe". In Cancik, Hubert; Schneider, Helmuth (eds.). Brill's New Pauly. Translated by Christine F. Salazar. Geneva: Brill Reference Online. doi:10.1163/1574-9347_bnp_e625650. ISSN 1574-9347.
- Pliny the Elder, The Natural History. John Bostock, M.D., F.R.S. H.T. Riley, Esq., B.A. London. Taylor and Francis, Red Lion Court, Fleet Street. 1855. Online version at the Perseus Digital Library.
- Plutarch, Moralia with an English translation by Frank Cole Babbitt. Cambridge, MA. Harvard University Press. London. William Heinemann Ltd. 1936. Online version at the Perseus Digital Library. Greek text available from the same website.
- Strabo, The Geography of Strabo, literally translated, with notes by H.C. Hamilton, Esq., W. Falconer, M.A., Ed., in three volumes. London. George Bell & Sons. 1903. Online text available at Perseus Digital Library.
- Torr, Cecil (1885). Rhodes in Ancient Times. UK: Cambridge University Press.
