= Halasarna =

Coordinates: 36°46′40″N 27°08′17″E

Halasarna (Ancient Greek: Ἁλασάρνα) or Halisarna (Ἁλισάρνα) or Halisarne (Ἁλασάρνη), was a town of ancient Greece on the south coast of the island of Cos.

Its site is located near modern Kardamaina. Excavations have been ongoing since 1985. When settlement began in the area is unknown, although some remains of the Neolithic and the Bronze Age have been found. Ceramic fragments have also been found from the geometric and orientalizing periods, but during those centuries and also during the classical period the size of the Halasarna as well as whether it was an independent polis (city-state) or a small village is open to interpretation. It could have been an independent polis before the refoundation by synoecism of the city of Cos, because of a revolt in the year 366 BCE. Afterwards it was probably a deme of Cos. The remains of a sanctuary of Apollo Halasarna believed to belong to the 4th century BCE, have been excavated. That sanctuary should have been the second most important on the island after that of Asclepius. The settlement continued to be inhabited during the Hellenistic and Roman periods. From these periods fragments of pottery, statues of marble and terracotta, and inscriptions have been found, as well as remains of an ancient theatre and early Christian basilicas, among other artefacts. It is believed that the place was abandoned around the seventh century due to an earthquake and fear of Arab invasions.
