= Doric Hexapolis =

Federation of six cities of Dorian foundation

Coordinates: 37°N 28°E

Doric Hexapolis Δωρικὴ Ἑξάπολις
- c. 1100 BC–c. 560 BC
- Greek settlements in western Asia Minor, Doric area in blue

- Location of the Doric Hexapolis in Anatolia
- Capital: Halicarnassus (largest city) (modern-day Bodrum, Muğla, Turkey)
- Government: Independent city-states
- Historical era: Ancient Greece
  - Established: c. 1100 BC
  - Disestablished: c. 560 BC

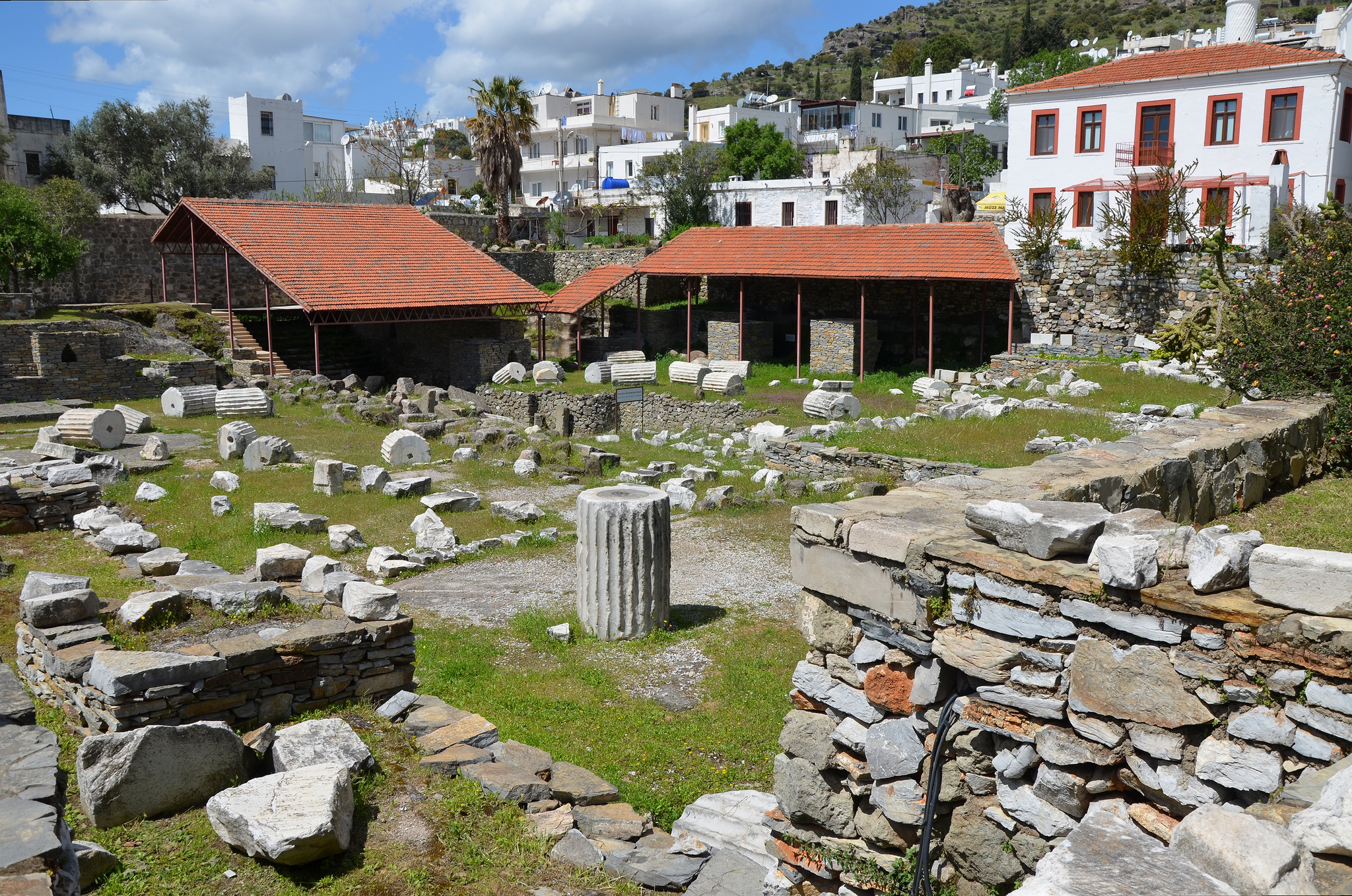
The ruins of the Mausoleum at Halicarnassus, one of the Seven Wonders of the Ancient World

The Doric or Dorian Hexapolis (Ancient Greek: Δωρικὴ Ἑξάπολις or Δωριέων Ἑξάπολις) was a federation of six cities of Dorian foundation in southwest Asia Minor and adjacent islands, largely coextensive with the region known as Doris or Doris in Asia (Δωρίς ἡ ἐν Ἀσίᾳ), and included:

- Cos, on the island of Cos;
- Cnidus in Caria;
- Halicarnassus in Caria;
- Lindus, on the island of Rhodes;
- Ialysus on Rhodes; and
- Camirus on Rhodes.

The members of this hexapolis celebrated a festival, with games, on the Triopian promontory near Cnidus, in honour of the Triopian Apollo; the prizes in those games were brazen tripods, which the victors had to dedicate in the temple of Apollo; and Halicarnassus was struck out of the league, because one of her citizens carried the tripod to his own house before dedicating it in the temple of Apollo. The hexapolis thus became the Doric Pentapolis. (Herod. i. 144.)

Pliny (v. 28) says, Caria mediae Doridi circumfunditur ad mare utroque latere ambiens, by which he means that Doris is surrounded by Caria on all sides, except where it is bordered by the sea. He makes Doris begin at Cnidus. In the bay of Doris he places Leucopolis, Hamaxitus, etc. An attempt has been made among scholars to ascertain which of two bays Pliny calls Doridis Sinus, the more probable being the Ceramic Gulf. This Doris of Pliny is the country occupied by the Dorians, which Thucydides (ii. 9) indicates, not by the name of the country, but of the people: Dorians, neighbours of the Carians. Ptolemy (v. 2) makes Doris a division of his Asia, and places in it Halicarnassus, Ceramus, and Cnidus. The term Doris, applied to a part of Asia, does not appear to occur in other writers.

In the Digesta seu Pandectae (533), the second volume of the codification of laws ordered by Justinian I (527–565) of the Eastern Roman Empire, a legal opinion written by the Roman jurist Paulus at the beginning of the Crisis of the Third Century in 235 AD was included about the Lex Rhodia ("Rhodian law") that articulates the general average principle of marine insurance established on the island of Rhodes in approximately 1000 to 800 BC as a member of the Doric Hexapolis, plausibly by the Phoenicians during the proposed Dorian invasion and emergence of the purported Sea Peoples during the Greek Dark Ages (c. 1100 – c. 750) that led to the proliferation of the Doric Greek dialect. The law of general average constitutes the fundamental principle that underlies all insurance.
