= Double Heroides =

Set of 6 epistolary poems

The Double Heroides are a set of six epistolary poems allegedly composed by Ovid in Latin elegiac couplets, following the fifteen poems of his Heroides, and numbered 16 to 21 in modern scholarly editions. These six poems present three separate exchanges of paired epistles: one each from a heroic lover from Greek or Roman mythology to his absent beloved, and one from the heroine in return. Ovid's authorship is uncertain.

Front matter of Boswell's copy of the 1732 edition of the Heroides, edited by Peter Burmann. Note the title Heroides sive Epistolae, "The Heroides or the Letters".

== The collection ==
The single Heroides (1–15) are not listed here: see the relevant section of that article for the single epistles. The paired epistles are written as exchanges between the following heroes and heroines:

- XVI. Paris to Helen, trying to persuade her to leave her husband, Menelaus, and go with him to Troy
- XVII. Helen's reply to Paris, revealing her readiness to leave Menelaus for him
- XVIII. Leander to Hero, on his love for her
- XIX. Hero's reply to Leander, on her love for him
- XX. Acontius to Cydippe, on his love for her, reminding her of her commitment to marry him
- XXI. Cydippe's reply to Acontius, agreeing to marry him

== Selected bibliography ==
For further references specifically relating to that subject, please see the single Heroides bibliography.

- Anderson, W. S. (1973) "The Heroides", in J. W. Binns (ed.) Ovid (London and Boston): 49-83.
- Barchiesi, A. (1995) Review of Hintermeier (1993), Journal of Roman Studies (JRS) 85: 325-7.
- ___. (1999) "Vers une histoire à rebours de l'élégie latine: Les Héroides 'Doubles' (16–21)", in A. Deremetz and J. Fabre-Serris, eds., Élégie et Épopée dans la Poésie ovidienne (Héroides et Amours): En Hommage à Simone Viarre (Lille): 53–67. (=Electronic Antiquity 5.1)
- Beck, M. (1996) Die Epistulae Heroidum XVIII und XIX des Corpus Ovidianum (Paderborn).
- Belfiore, E. (1980–81) "Ovid's Encomium of Helen", Classical Journal (CJ) 76.2: 136-48.
- Bessone, F. (2003) "Discussione del mito e polifonia narrativa nelle Heroides. Enone, Paride ed Elena (Ov. Her. 5 e 16-17)", in M. Guglielmo and E. Bona (eds.), Forme di communicazione nel mondo antico e metamorfosi del mito: dal teatro al romanzo, Culture antiche, studi e testi 17 (Alexandria): 149-85.
- Clark, S. B. (1908) "The Authorship and the Date of the Double Letters in Ovid's Heroides", Harvard Studies in Classical Philology (HSCP) 19: 121-55.
- Courtney, E. (1965) "Ovidian and Non-Ovidian Heroides", Bulletin of the Institute of Classical Studies of the University of London (BICS) 12: 63-6.
- ___. (1998) "Echtheitskritik: Ovidian and Non-Ovidian Heroides Again", CJ 93: 157-66.
- Cucchiarelli, A. (1995) "'Ma il giudice delle dee non era un pastore?' Reticenze e arte retorica di Paride (Ov. Her. 16)", Materiali e discussioni per l'analisi dei testi classici (MD) 34: 135-152.
- Drinkwater, M. (2003) Epic and Elegy in Ovid's Heroides: Paris, Helen, and Homeric Intertext. Diss. Duke University.
- Farrell, J. (1998) "Reading and Writing the Heroides", Harvard Studies in Classical Philology (HSCP) 98: 307-338.
- Hardie, P. R. (2002) Ovid's Poetics of Illusion (Cambridge).
- Jacobson, H. (1974) Ovid's Heroides (Princeton).
- Jolivet, J.-C. (2001) Allusion et fiction epistolaire dans Les Heroïdes: Recherches sur l'intertextualité ovidienne, Collection de l' École Française de Rome 289 (Rome).
- Kenney, E. J. (1979) "Two Disputed Passages in the Heroides", Classical Quarterly (CQ) 29: 394-431.
- ___. (1995) "'Dear Helen . . .': The Pithanotate Prophasis?", Papers of the Leeds Latin Seminar (PLLS) 8: 187-207.
- ___. (ed.) (1996) Ovid Heroides XVI-XXI (Cambridge).
- ___. (1999) "Ut erat novator: Anomaly, Innovation and Genre in Ovid, Heroides 16-21", in J. N. Adams and R. G. Mayer (eds.) Aspects of the Language of Latin Poetry, Proceedings of the British Academy 93 (Oxford): 401-14.
- Knox, P. E. (1986) "Ovid's Medea and the Authenticity of Heroides 12", Harvard Studies in Classical Philology (HSCP) 90: 207-23.
- ___. (ed.) (1995) Ovid: Heroides. Select Epistles (Cambridge).
- ___. (2000) Review of Beck (1996), Gnomon 72: 405-8.
- ___. (2002) "The Heroides: Elegiac Voices", in B. W. Boyd (ed.) Brill's Companion to Ovid (Leiden): 117-39.
- Michalopoulos, A. N. (2006) Ovid Heroides 16 & 17: Introduction, Text and Commentary (Cambridge).
- Nesholm, E. (2005) Rhetoric and Epistolary Exchange in Ovid's Heroides 16-21. Diss. University of Washington.
- Rosati, G. (1991) "Protesilao, Paride, e l'amante elegiaco: un modello omerico in Ovidio", Maia 43.2: 103-14.
- ___. (1992) "L'elegia al femminile: le Heroides di Ovidio (e altre heroides)", Materiali e discussioni per l'analisi dei testi classici (MD) 29: 71-94.
- Rosenmeyer, P. A. (1997) "Ovid's Heroides and Tristia: Voices from Exile", Ramus 26.1: 29-56.
- Thompson, P. A. M. (1989) Ovid, Heroides 20 and 21, Commentary with Introduction. Diss. University of Oxford.
- ___. (1993) "Notes on Ovid, Heroides 20 and 21", Classical Quarterly (CQ) 43: 258-65.
- Tracy, V. A. (1971) "The Authenticity of Heroides 16-21", Classical Journal (CJ) 66.4: 328-330.
- Viarre, S. (1987) "Des poèmes d'Homère aux 'Heroïdes' d'Ovide: Le récit épique et son interpretation élégiaque", Bulletin de l'association Guillaume Budé Ser. 4: 3.
