= Zariadres (mythology) =

Caucasian king in Greek mythology

In Greek mythology, Zariadres (Ancient Greek: Ζαριάδρης, romanized: Zariádrēs) is a Caucasian king who fell in love with Odatis, a princess of a neighbouring Scythian kingdom against the wishes of her father Omartes. Zariadres managed to trick Omartes and make Odatis his wife without his permission. Zariadres' tale is preserved in the works of second to third-century Greek author Athenaeus. The myth seems to have evolved from an ancient Persian tale.

== Etymology ==
The proper name Zariadres (Ζαριάδρης) is the Ancient Greek rendering of a foreign name of Iranian origin, which in the Aramaic inscriptions of Artaxias I is attested as zrytr/zryhr, and also appears as Zareh in Armenian sources. The name derives from the Old Iranian phrase *Zari āθra, which translates to 'with golden fire'.

== Family ==
Zariadres and his older brother Hystaspes (Vishtaspa), the king of Media, were the sons of Aphrodite and Adonis.

== Mythology ==
Zariadres was a very handsome youth, king of the land between the Caspian Gates and the river Tanais (that is the North Caucasus, now governed by Russia). He and the Scythian princess Odatis of the Marathi tribe saw each other's faces in their dreams, and instantly fell in love. However Odatis was an only child, so her father Omartes, lacking a male heir, wished for her to marry one of his own people at court, and refused Zariadres his daughter's hand in marriage when he asked for it. He then invited all of his male friends and kin to a marriage banquet in which Odatis was to indicate which man she wanted to take for husband by personally filling his cup with wine and placing it in their hands.

Zariadres himself was preoccupied with a military expedition near the banks of the Tanais river at the time. A message from Odatis reached him, detailing king Omartes' plans for her marriage, so Zariadres left his army and set off for Scythia with just one attendant, his charioteer, covering a distance of 800 stadia (around 120 or 168 kilometres) without stopping so that he would be able to arrive on time.

He arrived at Omartes' hall disguised in a Scythian dress, and there he approached the tearful Odatis who was mixing wine in the goblets. Whispering, he revealed to her his true identity, and the maiden enthusiastically put the wine cup in his hands. Zariadres seized her and carried her off in his chariot. When Omartes commanded his sympathising servants and handmaidens to pursue the runaway lovers, they feigned ignorance of the direction they had gone. Thus Zariadres and Odatis were allowed to be together.

== In culture ==
The story originates from the works of Alexander the Great's general Chares of Mytilene, quoted by Athenaeus in his Sophists at Dinner; according to Athenaeus, it was a very popular story in Asia Minor with multiple artistic presentations, and Odatis as a common feminine name among nobility.

The story shares strong elements with a tale from Iranian literature in which Guštâsp, brother of Zarêr, wins the daughter of the ruler of Rûm.

== See also ==
Other love stories from Greek mythology:

- Rhodopis and Euthynicus
- Cercaphus and Cydippe
- Rhadine and Leontichus
- Pyramus and Thisbe

== Bibliography ==
- Athenaeus, The Deipnosophists, Or Banquet Of The Learned Of Athenaeus. London. Translated by Henry G. Bohn, York Street, Covent Garden. 1854. Online text available at Perseus Digital Library.
- Marciak, Michał (2017). Sophene, Gordyene, and Adiabene: Three Regna Minora of Northern Mesopotamia Between East and West. BRILL. ISBN 9789004350724.
- Schottky, Martin (October 1, 2006). "Zariadres". In Cancik, Hubert; Schneider, Helmuth (eds.). Brill's New Pauly. Translated by Christine F. Salazar. Pretzfeld: Brill Reference Online. ISSN 1574-9347.
- Smith, William (1873). A Dictionary of Greek and Roman Biography and Mythology. London, UK: John Murray, printed by Spottiswoode and Co. Online version at the Perseus.tufts library.
