= Astypalaea (Cos) =

Town of ancient Greece on the island of Cos

Coordinates: 36°44′47″N 26°57′31″E

Astypalaea or Astypalaia (Ancient Greek: Ἀστυπάλαια), also known as Isthmus or Isthmos (Ἰσθμός), was a town of ancient Greece in the southwest of the island of Cos, which the inhabitants abandoned in order to build Cos.

Its site is located near modern Kefalos.
