= Hegetoria =

Woman in Greek mythology

In Greek mythology, Hegetoria (Ancient Greek: Ἡγητορία) was a local nymph at Rhodes who married Ochimus. They had a daughter, Cydippe (named later as Cyrbia), who married Ochimus's brother, Cercaphus, successor to his brother's throne.

According to an alternate version, Ochimus engaged Cydippe to Ocridion but Cercaphus loved her and kidnapped her. The latter did not return until Ochimus was old.
