= Triopium =

Town on the coast of ancient Caria

Coordinates: 36°41′05″N 27°29′35″E

Triopium or Triopion and Triopia (Ancient Greek: Τριόπιον and Τριοπία) was a town on the coast of ancient Caria, near ancient Cnidus. According to ancient writers Triopas was the founder of the city, and took its name after him.

At Triopium there was a temple of Apollo. The temple was built with common expenses from the Greek cities of the region.

Its site is located near Kumyer, Asiatic Turkey.
