= Electryone =

Daughter of Helios

In Greek mythology, Electryone (Ancient Greek: Ἠλεκτρυώνη) or Alectrona (Doric form) was a daughter of Helios and Rhodos, and sister to the Heliadae. She died a virgin and was worshipped as a heroine on the island of Rhodes.

The Doric form of her name is akin to the Greek word for "rooster" (Alectrona, the feminine genitive of Αλεκτορ, Alektor, the ancient Greek word for 'rooster'), while the Attic form Electryone is akin to the word for "amber" (Ἠλέκτρα, Elektra), as in the amber color of sunrise.

A marble tablet from the 3rd century BC found in Ialyssus contains an inscription about the regulations for visitors to the temple of Alectrona.
