= Acontius =

Kean man in Greek mythology

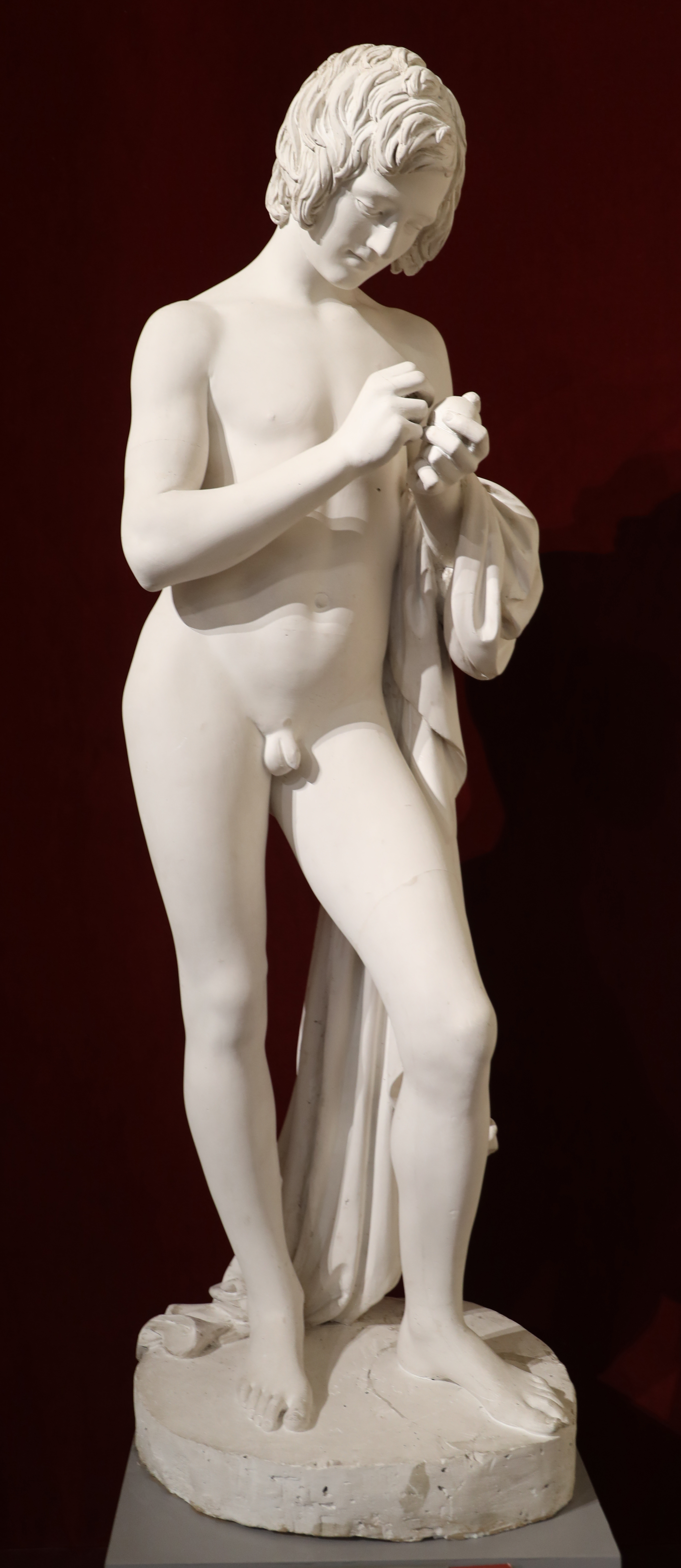
1835 statue of Acontius inscribing the apple by Ulisse Cambi, Florence Art Gallery.

Acontius (Ancient Greek: Ἀκόντιος, romanized: Akóntios, lit. 'javelin') in ancient Greek and Roman mythology is a beautiful youth from the Aegean island of Ceos, known for his love story in which he falls hopelessly in love with the maiden Cydippe, and employs a trick in order to get her to marry him in the eyes of the gods.

The myth is of Hellenistic origin and first appearing in the works of Alexandrian poet Callimachus, though made known thanks to its inclusion in Ovid's Double Heroides. Several other authors also recounted the tale.

== Etymology ==
The youth's name Ἀκόντιος is the masculine form of the ancient Greek common noun ἀκόντιον (akóntion), which translates to javelin. It is the diminutive form of ἄκων (ákōn), meaning the same thing.

== Mythology ==
According to the tale, Acontius was a very good-looking man from Ioulis in Ceos born to respectable but not rich parents. He arrived at Delos on the occasion of a festival in honour of Apollo. It was there that Eros shot him with an arrow and made him fall in love with the beautiful Cydippe of Naxos or Athens, who had come with her family and slaves to offer incense and wine. Accontius then took an apple (or rarely a quince) from the garden of Aphrodite and inscribed the words 'By Artemis, I will marry Acontius' on it, and threw it at her feet. When Cydippe picked up the apple from the ground she read the words out loud, sealing the promise. None the wiser, Cydippe simply discarded the apple and ignored the incident.

Acontius' love for Cydippe tormented him, as he suffered sleepless nights and isolated himself in the farmlands and vineyards, trying to avoid his father and writing her name on the barks of trees. Cydippe meanwhile was promised to someone else, and preparations began for her wedding. But when she entered the bridechamber, a terrible disease befell her, which almost killed her, and thus the wedding was delayed. Ovid has the ardent lover stealthily follow the slaves to ask about Cydippe's condition.

When Cydippe finally recovered the wedding plans continued as usual, but for a second time the moment she entered the bridechamber she fell gravely ill for seven months, and after that this happened for a third time as well. Her father consulted the oracle of Apollo, who informed them that his sister was not going to let Cydippe marry anyone but the one she had given a vow to.

When her father returned, Cydippe recounted to him the incident at the Delian temple. Thus Acontius and Cydippe were joined in marriage bonds in Naxos, and through their happy marriage they became ancestors of the Acontiadae tribe.

== Culture ==
The oldest source this tale appears in is Callimachus' third book of the fragmentary Aetia, who attributed the tale to Xenomedes, a writer who recorded a lot of local Keian lore and tradition. The story is a genealogical aition (or origin story) for the people of Ioulis, a city which was founded by the line of Acontius.

In ancient Greek culture the apple, the instrument Acontius uses to secure his marriage to Cydippe, was the most important fruit symbol of Aphrodite, as the emblem of her victory in the beauty contest against Hera and Athena, and thus became "the love token par excellence". Apples were common love-gifts, but apparently Cydippe did not realise it.

An almost identical tale was also said about the youths Ctesylla and Hermochares, whose tale was preserved by Antoninus Liberalis. However, in this version Ctesylla eventually dies in childbirth due to the oathbreaking.

== See also ==
- Rhodopis and Euthynicus
- Daphnis and Chloe
- Clytie

== Bibliography ==
- Antoninus Liberalis, The Metamorphoses of Antoninus Liberalis translated by Francis Celoria (Routledge 1992). Online version at the Topos Text Project.
- Aristaenetus, Epistolae, with Latin translation and notes, 1600. Archive.
- Avery, Catherine B., ed. (1962). New Century Classical Handbook. New York, US: Appleton-Century-Crofts.
- Bell, Robert E. (1991). Women of Classical Mythology: A Biographical Dictionary. ABC-Clio. ISBN 9780874365818.
- Callimachus (2022). Aetia. Iambi. Lyric Poems. Loeb Classical Library 421. Translated by Dee L. Clayman. Cambridge, MA: Harvard University Press.
- Cyrino, Monica S (2010). Aphrodite. Gods and Heroes of the Ancient World. New York and London: Routledge. ISBN 978-0-415-77523-6.
- Fowler, Robert L. (2000). Early Greek Mythography. Vol. 2: Commentary. Oxford, UK: Oxford University Press. ISBN 978-0-19-814741-1.
- Grimal, Pierre (1987). The Dictionary of Classical Mythology. Wiley-Blackwell. ISBN 0-631-13209-0.
- Hard, Robin (2004). The Routledge Handbook of Greek Mythology: Based on H.J. Rose's "Handbook of Greek Mythology". Routledge. ISBN 9780415186360.
- Heinze, Theodor (October 1, 2006). "Cydippe". In Cancik, Hubert; Schneider, Helmuth (eds.). Brill's New Pauly. Translated by Christine F. Salazar. Geneva: Brill Reference Online. doi:10.1163/1574-9347_bnp_e625650. ISSN 1574-9347.
- Liddell, Henry George; Scott, Robert (1940). A Greek-English Lexicon, revised and augmented throughout by Sir Henry Stuart Jones with the assistance of Roderick McKenzie. Oxford: Clarendon Press. Online version at Perseus.tufts project.
- March, Jennifer R. (2014). Dictionary of Classical Mythology. Oxbow Books. p. 11.
- Ovid (1914). G. P. Goold. (ed.). Heroides. Amores. Loeb Classical Library 41. Translated by Grant Showerman. Cambridge, MA: Harvard University Press.
- Rose, Herbert J. (2004). A Handbook of Greek Mythology (6th ed.). London, New York: Routledge. ISBN 0-415-04601-7.
- Smith, William (1873). A Dictionary of Greek and Roman Biography and Mythology. London, UK: John Murray, printed by Spottiswoode and Co. Online version at the Perseus.tufts library.
