= Ialysus (mythology) =

Founder of Ialysus in Greek mythology

In Greek mythology, Ialysus (/aɪˈælɪsəs/; Ancient Greek: Ἰάλυσος, romanized: Ialysós) or Jalysus (/ˈdʒælɪsəs/; Ἰᾱλυσός) was the eponymous founder of Ialysus in Rhodes. He was the eldest son of the Rhodian king, Cercaphus, one of the Heliades, and his niece Cydippe, daughter of Ochimus, also a former king. He had two younger brothers, Lindus and Camirus.

== Mythology ==
Ialysus and his brothers succeeded to the throne after their father's death. During their time, the great deluge came in which their mother, who was now named as Cyrbe, was buried beneath the flood and laid waste. Later on, they parted the land among themselves, and each of them founded a city which bore his name.

== See also ==
- Telchines
