= Macareus (son of Helios) =

In Greek mythology, Macareus (Ancient Greek: Μακαρεύς, romanized: Makareus, lit. 'happy', 'blissful', or 'blessed') or Macar (/ˈmeɪkər/; Μάκαρ Makar) was one of the Heliadae, sons of Helios and Rhodos.

== Mythology ==
Macareus and his brothers, Triopas, Actis and Candalus, were jealous of a fifth brother, Tenages's, skill at science, so they killed him and had to escape from Rhodes upon discovery of their crime. (The two Heliadae Ochimus and Cercaphus stayed aside and remained on the island of Rhodes).
