= Cos (city) =

City of ancient Greece

Coordinates: 36°53′37″N 27°17′26″E

Cos or Kos (Ancient Greek: Κῶς) was a city of ancient Greece on the island of the same name. In 366 BCE, the inhabitants of the town of Astypalaea abandoned their town to populate Cos. Cos was a member of the Dorian Pentapolis, whose sanctuary was on the Triopian promontory. Under the Athenian rule it had no walls, and it was first fortified by Alcibiades at the close of the Peloponnesian War. In subsequent times it shared the general fate of the neighbouring coasts and islands. Antoninus Pius rebuilt the city, after it had been destroyed by an earthquake.

Its site is located near modern Kos.

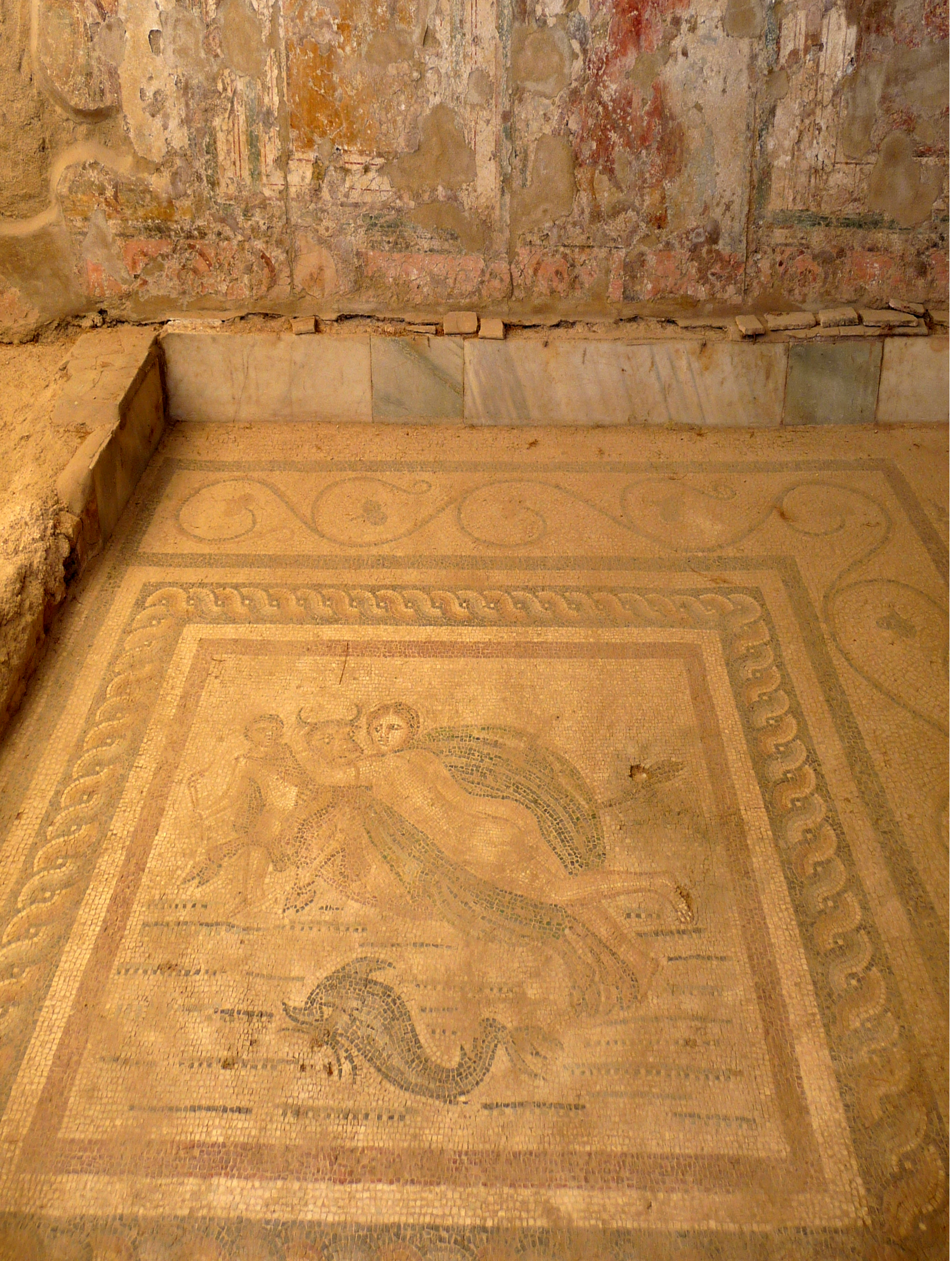
An Ancient Roman mosaic depicting the Abduction of Europa in the House of Europa in the Western Archaeological Zone of Kos town

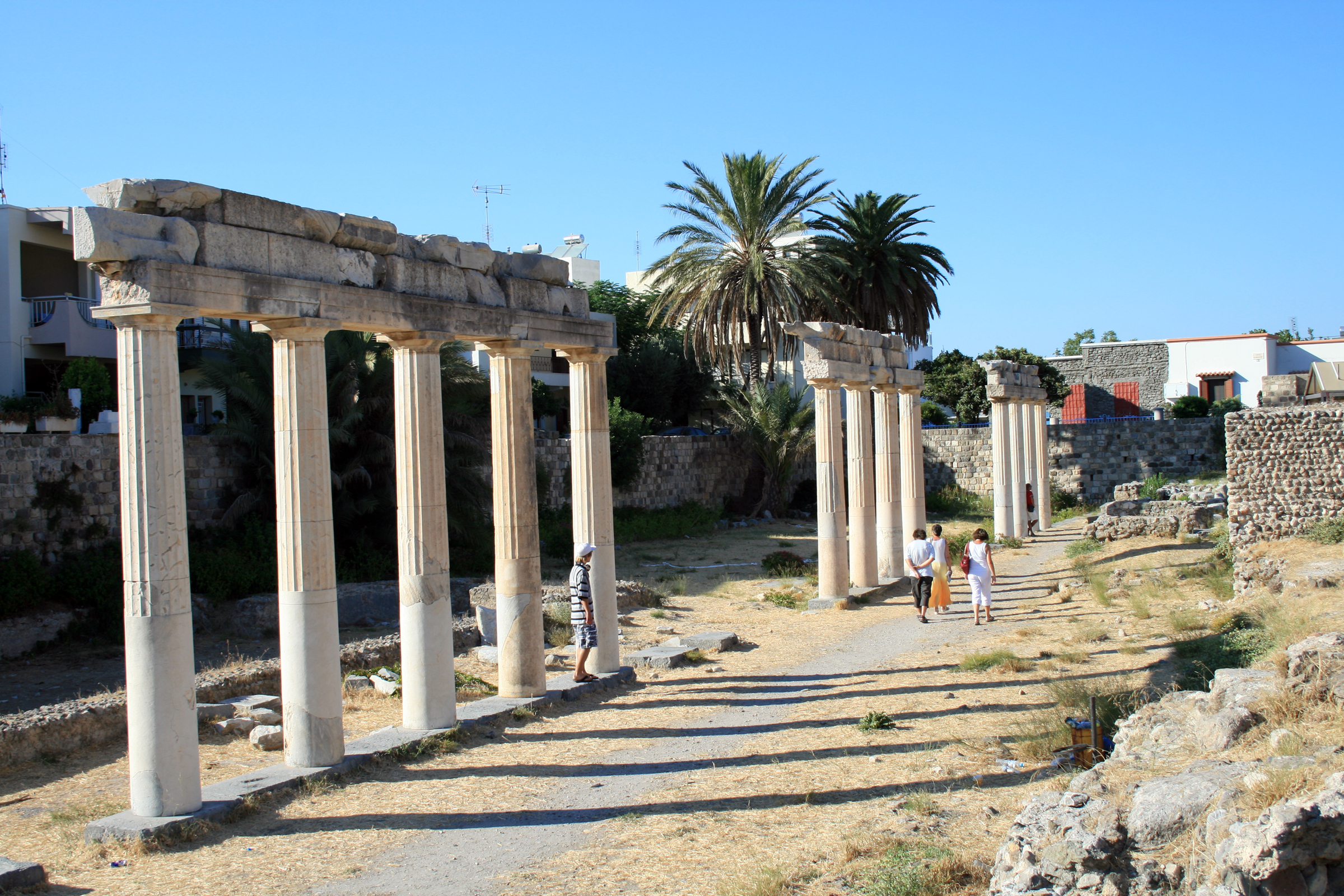
Ruins of the Ancient Gymnasion

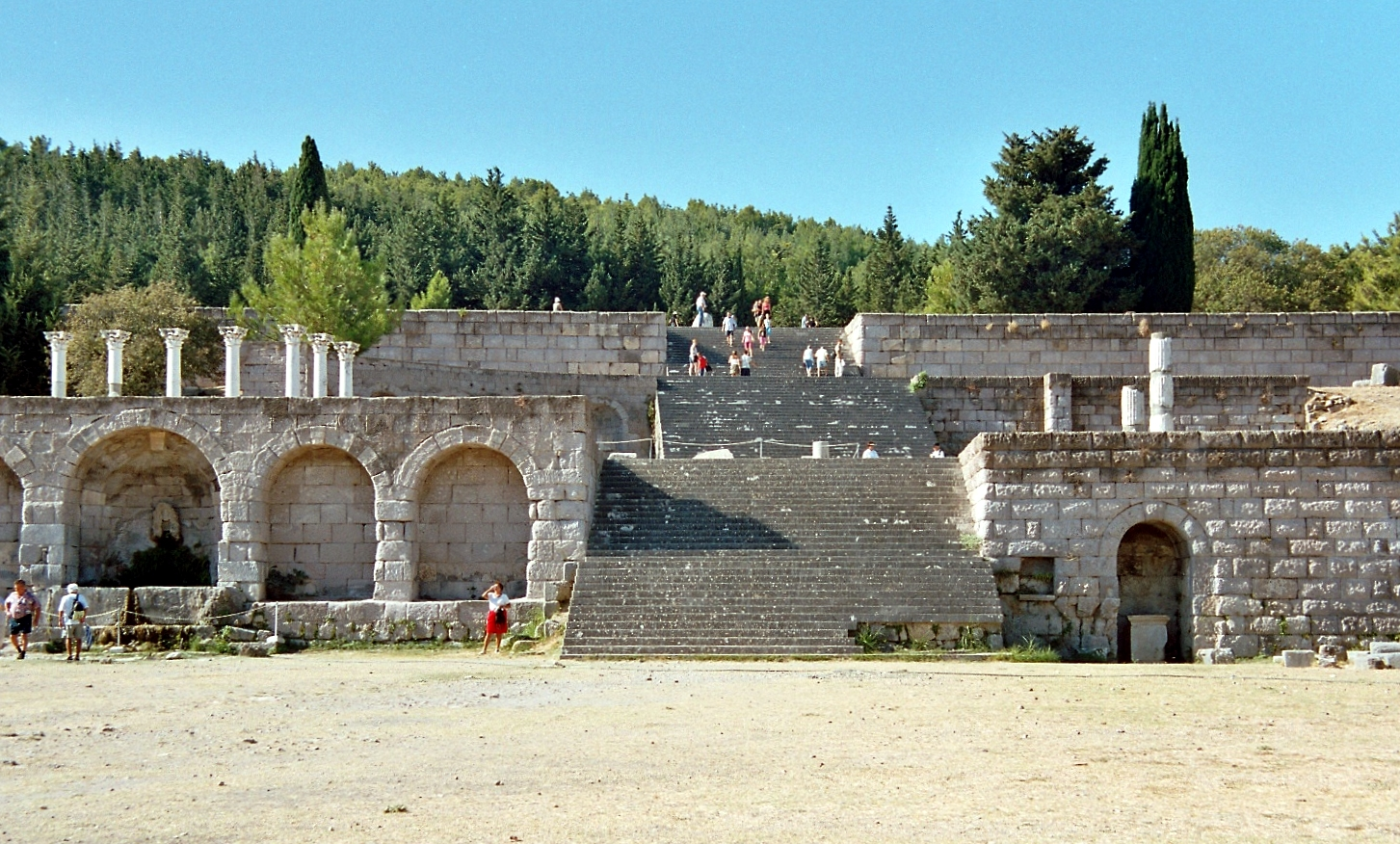
View of the Asclepeion

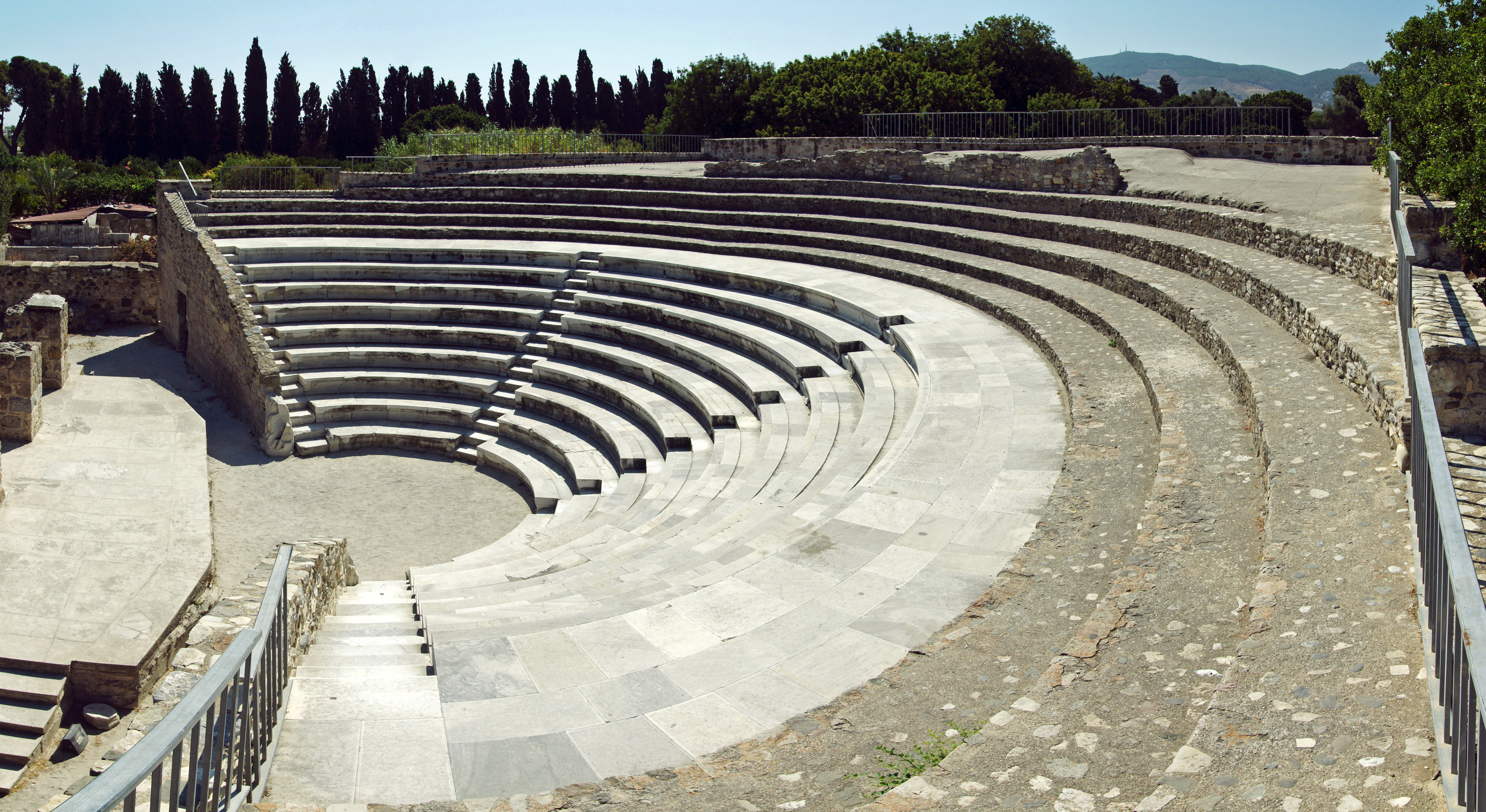
View of the ancient Odeon
