= Hamaxitus (Caria) =

Town of ancient Caria

Hamaxitus (Ancient Greek: Ἁμαξιτός) was a town of ancient Caria mentioned by Pliny the Elder as being on north coast of the Cnidian Chersonesus. Its site is unlocated.
