= W. M. Spackman =

William Mode Spackman (May 20, 1905 – August 3, 1990) was an American writer. He was born in Coatesville, Pennsylvania, the son of George Harvey Spackman and Alice Pennock Mode. A graduate of the Friends School of Wilmington, Delaware and in 1927 Princeton University (B.A.; later also an M.A.), he was also a Rhodes Scholar at Balliol College, Oxford. In 1929, he married Mary Ann Matthews (1902–1978); they had three children: Peter (1930–1995), Ann (1932–1961), and Harriet (born 1934). Spackman was awarded a Rockefeller Fellowship to study public opinion at Columbia University. Spackman also taught classics briefly at New York University and worked in radio.

Spackman's literary success came relatively late in life. He wrote about romance from a realistic rather than a romantic perspective. Highly praised by critics like John Leonard, John Updike, and Stanley Elkin, he has been called a "Fabergé of novelists" and his works have been called "delicate comedies." The characters in his novels are school friends, their associations, often in New York City, and the women with whom they spent time.

He was the author of:

- An Armful of Warm Girl (1978)
- A Difference in Design (1983)
- A Little Decorum, for Once (1985)
- Heyday (1953)
- A Presence with Secrets (1980)
- As I Sauntered Out, One Mid-Century Morning (published posthumously in the following:)
- The Complete Fiction of W.M. Spackman (Dalkey Archive Press, 1997)

He was also the author of a collection of essays entitled On the Decay of Humanism (Rutgers University Press, 1967). Its contents, along with his other essays and reviews, were reprinted in On the Decay of Criticism: The Complete Essays of W. M. Spackman (Fantagraphics Books, 2017).

Typescript drafts, revisions, and galley proofs of three of his novels have been deposited in the archives of the Princeton University Library.
