= Mellin de Saint-Gelais =

French poet (c. 1491–1558)

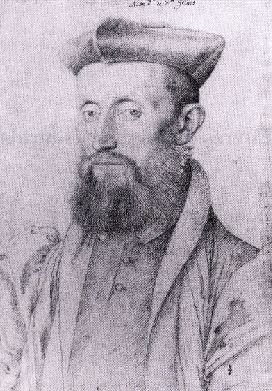
Mellin de Saint Gelais (1490–1558), chalk drawing by François Clouet (1510–1572), Musée Condé, Château de Chantilly)

Mellin de Saint-Gelais (or Melin de Saint-Gelays or Sainct-Gelais; c. 1491 – October 1558) was a French poet of the Renaissance and Poet Laureate of Francis I of France.

== Life ==
He was born at Angoulême, most likely the natural son of Jean de Saint-Gelais, marquis de Montlieu, a member of the Angoumois gentry. His forename was the French-Norman malapropism of the British wizard Merlin featured in Arthurian legends. He was close to his uncle Octavien de Saint-Gelais (1466–1502), bishop of Angoulême since 1494, himself a poet who had translated the Aeneid into French.

Mellin, who had studied at Bologna and Padua, had the reputation of being doctor, astrologer and musician as well as poet. He returned to France around 1523, and soon gained favour at the court of the art-loving Valois ruler Francis I by his skill in light verse. He was made almoner to the Dauphin, abbot of Reclus in the diocese of Troyes and librarian to the king at Blois.

He enjoyed immense popularity until the appearance of Joachim du Bellay's Défense et illustration... in 1549, where Saint-Gelais was not excepted from the scorn poured on contemporary poets. He attempted to ridicule the innovators by reading aloud the Odes of Pierre de Ronsard with burlesque emphasis before Henry II, when the king's sister, Marguerite de Valois, seized the book and read them herself.

Ronsard accepted Saint-Gelais's apology for this incident, but Du Bellay satirized the offender in the Poète courtisan. He translated the Sofonisba of Gian Giorgio Trissino (1478–1550) which was represented in 1556 before Catherine de' Medici at Blois. Saint-Gelais was the champion of the style marotique (see Clément Marot) and the earliest of French sonneteers and petrarchist. He died in Paris in 1558.
