= Ocridion =

Greek mythological character

In Greek mythology, Ocridion (Ancient Greek: Ὀκριδίων) was a mortal man who was betrothed to Cydippe, the daughter of Ochimus. According to Rhodian tradition, Cydippe was taken away by her uncle Cercaphus, who had fallen in love with her. Cercaphus persuaded the herald responsible for bringing the bride to Ocridion to bring her to him instead. After taking Cydippe, Cercaphus fled with her. Because the herald had participated in this injustice, the Rhodians later decreed that heralds were not permitted to enter the heroon of Ocridion.
