= Heliadae =

Offspring of Helios in Greek mythology

In Greek mythology, the Heliadae or Heliadai (/hɪˈlaɪ.ədiː/; Ancient Greek: Ἡλιάδαι, romanized: Hēliádai) were the seven sons of Helios and Rhodos and grandsons of Poseidon. They were brothers to Electryone.

== Biography ==
They were Ochimus, Cercaphus, Macareus (or Macar), Actis, Tenages, Triopas, and Candalus (Nonnus adds Auges and Thrinax). They were expert astrologers and seafarers, and were the first to introduce sacrifices to Athena at Rhodes. They also drove the Telchines out of Rhodes.

== Mythology ==
Tenages was the most highly endowed of the Heliadae, and was eventually killed by Macareus, Candalus, Triopas and Actis. This is attributed to their jealousy of his skills at science. As soon as their crime was discovered, the four had to escape from Rhodes: Macareus fled to Lesbos, Candalus to Cos, Triopas to Caria, and Actis to Egypt. Ochimus and Cercaphus, who stayed aside from the crime, remained at the island and founded the city of Achaea (in the territory of modern Ialysos). Ochimus, the eldest of the brothers, seized control over the island; Cercaphus married Ochimus' daughter Cydippe and succeeded to the power. The three sons of Cercaphus, Lindus, Ialysus and Camirus, were founders and eponyms of the cities Lindos, Ialysos and Kameiros respectively.

== Genealogy ==
Greek sea gods

Gaia	Uranus
Oceanus	Tethys
The river gods	The Oceanids
Pontus	Thalassa
Nereus	Thaumas	Phorcys	Ceto	Eurybia	The Telchines	Halia	Poseidon	Thoosa	Aphrodite
Echidna	Gorgon	Graeae	Ladon	Hesperides	Sirens	Helios	Rhode	Polyphemus
Stheno	Deino	HELIADAE	Electryone
Euryale	Enyo
Medusa	Pemphredo
