= Ochimus =

Son of Helios in Greek mythology

In Greek mythology, Ochimus (Ancient Greek: Ὄχιμος, romanized: Okhimos) was the eldest of the Heliadae, sons of Helios and Rhodos.

== Mythology ==
One of his brothers, Tenages, was murdered by four others: Actis, Macareus, Candalus and Triopas, and they had to leave their native island of Rhodes. The final two Heliadae, Ochimus and Cercaphus, were the only to stay, as they had not been involved in the crime.

Ochimus seized control over the island. He married the nymph Hegetoria and they had a daughter, Cydippe (or Cyrbia), who married Ochimus' brother, Cercaphus, who succeeded to the throne of Rhodes. According to an alternate version, Ochimus engaged Cydippe to Ocridion but Cercaphus loved her and kidnapped her. The latter did not return until Ochimus was old. The three sons of Cercaphus and Cydippe inherited the island.
