= Octavien de Saint-Gelais =

French churchman, poet, and translator

Frontispiece to a manuscript of Octavien's translation of Ovid's Heroides (Huntington Library, MS HM 60, folio 1r).

Octavien de Saint-Gelais (1468–1502) was a French churchman, poet, and translator. He translated the Aeneid into French, as well as Ovid's Heroides.

Born in Cognac, Angoumois, he studied theology at the Collège de Navarre, and became a member of the court of Charles VIII of France. A terrible sickness led him to abandon a formerly frivolous lifestyle and he took holy orders. Charles appointed him bishop of Angoulême in 1494. In this capacity, he reformed the monastic rules, visited the poor, decorated churches, and composed original poems, besides translating the works of the ancients. His poetic compositions include Tout m'est dueil, tout m'est desplaisir and Plus n'ay d'actente au bien que j'espéroye.

An outbreak of the plague forced him to abandon his post as bishop in 1502, and he died the same year.

The French poet Clément Marot praised his work, and wrote that Saint-Gelais had made his birthplace, Cognac, eternal.

His nephew was the poet Mellin de Saint-Gelais.
