= Ialysus =

Ancient Rhodian city

Coordinates: 36°23′56″N 28°08′35″E

Ialysus or Ialysos (Greek: Ἰάλυσος), also Ialyssus or Ialyssos (Ἰάλυσσος), or Ielyssus or Ielyssos (Ἰήλυσσος), was a city of ancient Rhodes.

== History ==
=== Iron Age ===
It was one of the three ancient Doric cities in the island, and one of the six towns constituting the Doric hexapolis. It was situated only six stadia to the south-west of the city of Rhodes, and it would seem that the rise of the latter city was the cause of the decay of Ialysus; for in the time of Strabo it existed only as a village. Pliny the Elder did not consider it as an independent place at all, but imagined that Ialysus was the ancient name of Rhodes. Orychoma, the citadel, was situated above Ialysus, and still existed in the time of Strabo. It is supposed by some that Orychoma was the same as the fort Achaea or Achaia, which is said to have been the first settlement of the Heliadae in the island; at any rate, Achaia was situated in the territory of Ialysus, which bore the name Ialysia. The city is mentioned by numerous ancient authors, including Pindar, Herodotus, Thucydides, Ptolemy, Stephanus of Byzantium, Ovid, and Pomponius Mela, Dionysius Periegetes, and appears in the Periplus of Pseudo-Scylax.

Its site is located near modern Ialysos.
