= Actis (mythology) =

In Greek mythology, Actis (Ancient Greek: Ἀκτίς, lit. 'ray of light' or 'beam') was one of the Heliadae, sons of Rhodos and Helios. Actis, along with his brothers, Triopas, Macar, and Candalus, were jealous of a fifth brother, Tenages's, skill at science. They killed him and Actis escaped to Egypt. According to Diodorus Siculus, Actis built the city of Heliopolis in Egypt to honour his father Helios, and it was from Actis that the Egyptians learned astrology.
