= Tenages =

In Greek mythology, Tenages /ˈtɛnəˌdʒiːz/ or Tenage /ˈtɛnəˌdʒiː/ (Ancient Greek: Τενάγης, Τενάγη, romanized: Tenágēs, Tenágē) was one of the Heliadae, a son of Rhodos and Helios. He was murdered by his brothers, Actis, Triopas, Macar and Candalus, who were envious of Tenages's skill at science being the superior out of the Heliadae.
