= Lindus =

Ancient Rhodian city

Coordinates: 36°05′29″N 28°05′17″E

Lindus or Lindos (Greek: Λίνδος) was one of the most important towns in ancient Rhodes.

== History ==
It was situated on the eastern coast, a little to the north of a promontory bearing the same name. The district was in ancient times very productive in wine and figs, though otherwise it was very barren.

=== Late Bronze ===
In the Catalogue of Ships in the Iliad of Homer, Lindus, together with the two other Rhodian cities, Ialysus and Camirus, are said to have taken part in the war against Troy.

=== Iron Age ===
Their inhabitants were Dorians, and formed the three Dorian tribes of the island, Lindus itself being one of the Doric Hexapolis in the south-west of Asia Minor.

=== Classical Age ===
Previous to the year 408 BCE, when the city of Rhodes was built, Lindus, like the other cities, formed a little state by itself, but when Rhodes was founded, a great part of the population and the common government was transferred to the new city. Lindus, however, though it lost its political importance, still retained religious importance, for it contained two ancient and much revered sanctuaries – one of Athena, hence called the Lindian, and the other of Heracles. The former was believed to have been built by Danaus, or, according to others by his daughters on their flight from Egypt. The temple of Heracles was remarkable, according to Lactantius (Div.Inst. 1.21.31-37), on account of the vituperative and injurious language with which the worship was conducted. This temple contained a painting of Heracles by Parrhasius; and Lindus appears to have possessed several other paintings by the same artist.

Lindus also was the native place of Cleobulus, one of the Seven Sages of Greece; and Athenaeus has preserved a pretty poem ascribed to Cleobulus, and which the Lindian boys used to sing as they went round collecting money for the return of the swallows in spring.

Strabo's description of Lindus as "on the side of a hill, looking towards the south and Alexandria," cannot be mistaken; and the modern town of Lindos is exactly the spot occupied by the ancient Dorian city.

== See also ==
- List of ancient Greek cities
