= Ialysos =

Town in Rhodes, Greece

Ialysos Ιαλυσός
- Municipal unit
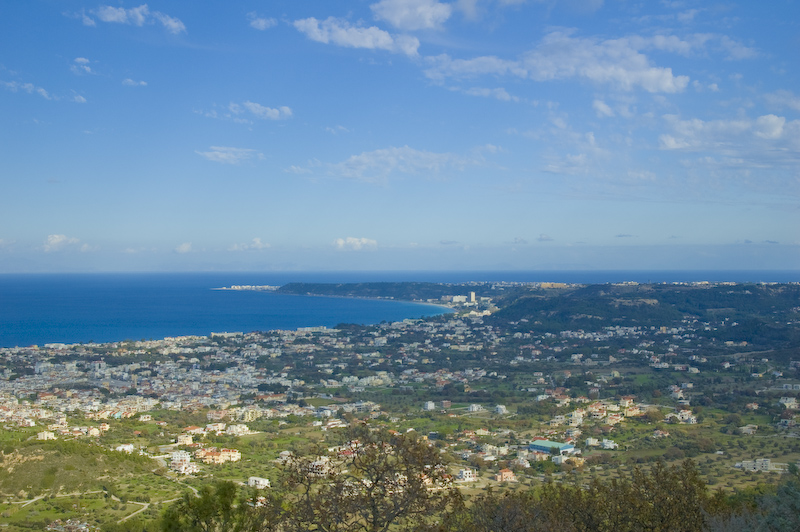
- Panorama of the town

- Location within Rhodes

- Location within Greece
- Coordinates: 36°25′N 28°09′E
- Country: Greece
- Administrative region: South Aegean
- Regional unit: Rhodes
- Municipality: Rhodes

Area
  - Municipal unit: 16.7 km^{2} (6.4 sq mi)

Population (2021)
  - Municipal unit: 12,717
  - Municipal unit density: 761/km^{2} (1,970/sq mi)
- Time zone: UTC+2 (EET)
  - Summer (DST): UTC+3 (EEST)

Ialysos (Greek: Ιαλυσός, before 1976: Τριάντα Trianta) is a town and a former municipality on the island of Rhodes, in the Dodecanese, Greece. Since the 2011 local government reform it is part of the municipality Rhodes, of which it is a municipal unit. The municipal unit has an area of 16.7 km^{2}. It is the second-largest town on the island of Rhodes, having a population of approximately 13,000. Ialysos is located eight kilometres (5.0 miles) west of the town of Rhodes, the island's capital, on the island's northwestern coast.

== Overview ==
The town is situated near the site of the ancient Doric polis of Ialysus, homeland of the famous ancient boxer Diagoras of Rhodes. The municipal unit consists of the town Trianta/Ialysos and the surrounding areas. While official sources use Trianta as a name for the town, and Ialysos for the whole municipal unit, unofficial usage tend to favour Ialysos to describe both the modern town and the municipal unit.

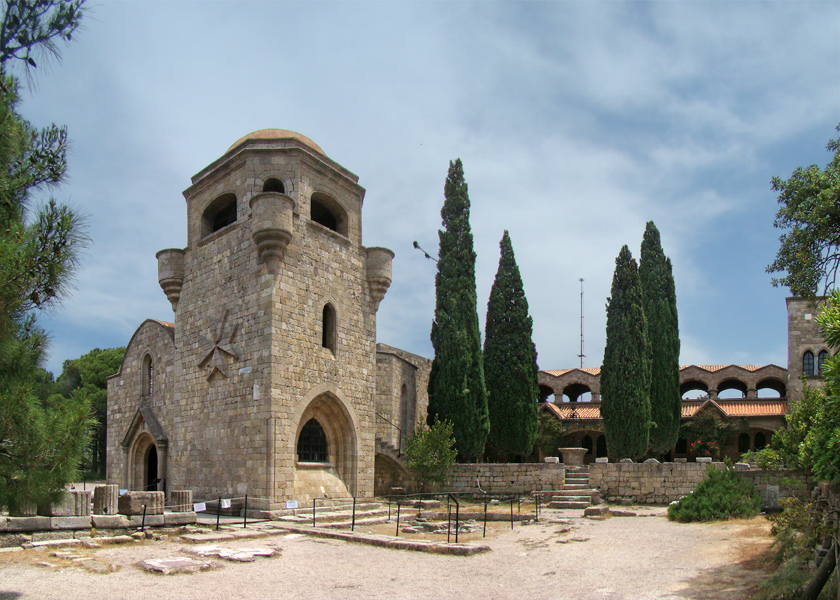
Filerimos Monastery

Until the mid-1980s Trianta/Ialysos was a village with a population of around 2500 people, but during the following years population grew to an official 10,107 at the 2001 census, as it to an increasing degree became a suburban district to the town of Rhodes. Ialysos has in addition become a tourist destination, with several hotels and resorts located on the coast, especially in the new settlement of Ixia, situated between the towns of Ialysos and Rhodes. Being on the usually windward north-western coast of the island, it is also a noted location for wind-surfing. The municipal unit has a land area of 16.700 square kilometres (6.448 sq mi), the smallest of any on Rhodes.

== Education ==
State facilities by category:

- Primary Education: 3 primary schools
- Secondary Education: 1 high school and 1 lyceum

== Sports ==
=== Football ===
Town football club Ialysos currently competes at national level third tier (Gamma Ethniki) while in the 90s team competed even at Beta Ethniki (now Football League) losing promotion to Greece's top league during the 1994-95 season.

=== Basketball ===
GAS Ialysos currently competes on local league but in the past reached national league C.

=== Sports venues ===
Town municipal "Ekonomideio" stadium hosts football and Ialysos indoor hall basketball.

== Notable people ==
- Timocreon (5th century BC) poet
- Diagoras of Rhodes (5th century BC) boxer

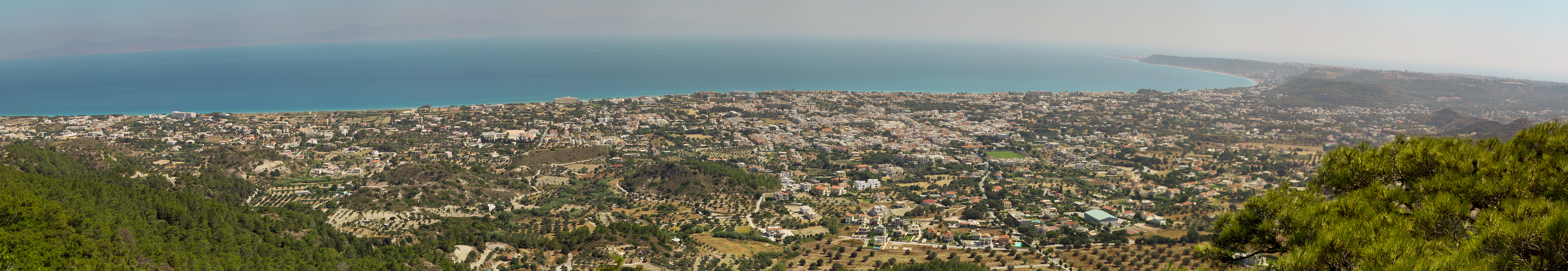
Filerimos Hill View

== See also ==
- Ialysos (mythology)
