= Candalus =

In Greek mythology, Candalus (Ancient Greek: Κάνδαλος, romanized: Kándalos) was one of the Heliadae, a son of Rhodos and Helios. Candalus, along with his brothers, Triopas, Macar and Actis, were jealous of their fifth brother, Tenages. They were jealous of his skills in science, and so they murdered him. After the murder came to light, Candalus fled Rhodes to Cos.
