= Cercaphus =

Mythological Greek characters

In Greek mythology, Cercaphus (Ancient Greek: Κέρκαφος) may refer to the following figures:

- Cercaphus, one of the Heliadae.
- Cercaphus, son of Aeolus and father of Ormenus, the eponymous founder of Ormenium in Thessaly.
- Cercaphus, father of Maeander by Anaxibia.
- Cercaphus, descendant of Helios (Sun) and brother of Alpheus. While contending about the kingdom, Cercaphus was slain by his brother who was then pursued by the Furies and later on, flung himself to the river Nyctimus in Arcadia which bore his name thereafter.
