= Planetae =

Planets as known in classical Greece and Rome

The planetae (Ancient Greek: πλανήται, romanized: planetai, Latin: planetae, lit. 'wanderers', or Ancient Greek: πλανωμένοι ἀστέρες, romanized: planomenoi asteres, Latin: stellae errantes, lit. 'wandering stars'), were the five naked-eye planets (the Classical planets) known to ancient Greek and Roman astronomers, who assigned them a variety of names, associated them with different gods, and ascribed various qualities to their apparent behaviour in the sky.

Some scholars included the Sun and Moon, making seven planets, representing the seven heavenly bodies that moved against the fixed background of stars. This concept survives in astrology, which was not clearly differentiated from astronomy before modern times. Others added the fixed stars, representing a single planet, along with the earth itself, and the antichthon, to make a system of ten.

== List ==
The five naked-eye planets, listed from the furthest or highest, in the classical understanding of the heavens, to the nearest or lowest:

- Phaenon (Ancient Greek: Φαίνων, romanized: Phainon, lit. 'the shining one'), associated with the god Cronus, Saturn to the Romans. Greek astronomers correctly observed that Saturn was the furthest of the naked-eye planets from the earth, and calculated its orbit at thirty years, only slightly greater than the actual period of 29.45 years. Noting the dimness of its light compared with that of Jupiter, they reasoned that as the furthest from the sun, it must be cold and icy. Following this notion, astrologers believed that Saturn exerted a malign influence upon the universe. This quality is touched upon by the Roman poets, including Horace, Persius, and Juvenal.
- Phaethon (Note: Not to be confused with Phaethon, the son of Helios, the sun god.) (Ancient Greek: Φαέθων, romanized: Phaethon, lit. 'shining', 'radiant'), associated with the god Zeus, Jove or Jupiter to the Romans. The Greeks knew that Jupiter was the second-furthest planet from earth, and believed its orbit to take twelve years, very close to the actual period of 11.86 years. Shining brightly between distant, cool Saturn and nearer, fiery Mars, the Greeks supposed that Jupiter existed in a happy medium between the two extremes, and thus astrologers regarded its influence as beneficent, moderating that of Saturn, a quality mentioned by Horace and Persius.
- Pyroeis (Ancient Greek: Πυρόεις, romanized: Pyroeis, lit. 'fiery'), associated with the god Ares, Mars to the Romans, or with the demi-god Heracles, Hercules to the Romans. Greek astronomers knew that Mars was the next-furthest planet following Saturn and Jupiter, and believed that its orbit took two years, slightly longer than the actual period of 1.88 years. From its reddish colour, the Greeks supposed that Mars was a hot and fiery star, and astrologers ascribed similar traits to its influence upon the cosmos. Typically astrologers associated Mars, like Saturn, with misfortune.
- Phosphorus (Ancient Greek: Φωσφόρος, romanized: Phosphoros, lit. 'light-bearer') and Hesperus (Ancient Greek: Ἕσπερος, romanized: Hesperos, lit. 'evening'), personifications of the morning and evening stars, respectively, were associated with Aphrodite, Venus to the Romans, who also identified this planet with Juno, Isis, and the Magna Mater. Eosphorus (Ancient Greek: Ἑωσφόρος, romanized: Eosphoros, lit. 'dawn-bearer') was another name for Phosphorus among the Greeks, while the Romans referred to the morning and evening stars as Lucifer ("light-bearer") and Vesper ("evening").

Because most Greek astronomers followed a geocentric model of the universe, they could not agree on the relative distances of the Sun, Venus, and Mercury from the earth, or their position relative to one another in the heavens; and they were unable to calculate the orbital periods of Venus and Mercury accurately. Pliny the Elder attempted to measure the orbital period of Venus, which he gave as 348 days, considerably longer than the actual period of 225 days.
Astrologers generally regarded Venus as a source of good fortune, along with Jupiter and the Moon. In his sixth satire, Juvenal criticizes the belief in astrology by superstitious women, who place their faith in the stars without understanding what dangers Saturn forebodes, or in what constellation Venus brings good fortune.

- Stilbon (Ancient Greek: Στίλβων, romanized: Stilbon, lit. '"the Glittering One"') refers to Mercury and was associated with the god Hermes, Mercury to the Romans, or with Apollo. Due to the geocentric model of the cosmos used by most Greek astronomers, there was no agreement as to Mercury's position in the heavens relative to the Sun and Venus, and it proved impossible to determine the period of its orbit accurately. Pliny's estimate was 339 days, nearly four times the actual period of 88 days. Astrologers regarded Mercury's influence upon the universe as variable, alternately beneficent or causing misfortune. The name "Stilbon" translates to "the shining, glittering".

To these, some scholars added the Sun and Moon, although because the predominant view of the cosmos was geocentric, it was impossible to determine whether Mercury and Venus were nearer or further than the Sun, and which of the two was nearest the earth; thus the order of the seven planets, including the sun and moon, varied from source to source. Philolaus, one of the first scholars to suggest the possibility of a heliocentric universe, added three more planets: the sphere containing the fixed stars, the earth itself, and the antichthon, a hypothetical world beneath the earth, making a total of ten.

== History ==
According to Plutarch and Stobaeus, the term planeta was in use by the time of Anaximander, in the early sixth century BC. The relative positions of the planets, which in the reckoning of Democritus included the Sun and Moon, was the subject of debate, as was their number; in Timaeus, Plato counts only the five still regarded as astronomical planets, excluding the Sun and Moon.

Phosphorus and Hesperus appear in the earliest surviving works of Greek literature. Homer mentions them in the Iliad and the Odyssey, and in the Theogony, Hesiod calls Phosphorus the son of Eos. In these works the morning and evening stars are treated as separate entities, but the fact that both were astronomically the same planet was recognized at an early date. This realization was attributed by Apollodorus to Pythagoras, or to Parmenides, according to Favorinus.

The earliest surviving instance of Hermes being expressly identified with the planet occurs in Timaeus, but the first known list of the five astronomical planets in Greek writing is from Epinomis, either a late work of Plato's, or of one of his disciples. Here they are enumerated as the stars of Cronus, Zeus, Ares, Aphrodite, and Hermes, in that order. Aristotle supplies a second set of names that came to be used in astronomy: Phaenon, Phaethon, Pyroeis, Phosphorus, and Stilbon, for the same planets, respectively. He also notes that Pyroeis is sometimes called the star of Heracles, instead of Ares, and that some refer to Stilbon as the star of Apollo, rather than Hermes.

The Romans also applied varying names to some of the planets. According to Pliny the Elder, the stars of Saturn and Jupiter were agreed upon, but the red planet was identified with either Mars or Hercules; the brightest of the planets with Venus, Juno, Isis, or the Magna Mater, as well as being referred to as Lucifer, the morning star, or Vesper, the evening star; and lastly the swiftest as the star of either Mercury or Apollo. Still other names occur in Achilles Tatius and in the grammarians and lexicographers of imperial times.

== See also ==
- Astrotheology – Theological discipline
- Celestial spheres – Elements of some cosmological models
- Classical planet – Planets visible to the naked eye
- Navagraha – Nine heavenly bodies in Indian astrology
- Wufang Shangdi – Traditional Chinese fivefold deity

== Bibliography ==
- Homer, Iliad, Odyssey.
- Hesiod, Theogony.
- Apollodorus, Peri Theon (About the Gods).
- Democritus, Peri ton Planeton (About the Planets).
- Plato, Timaeus; Epinomis (attributed).
- Aristotle, Peri Cosmou (About the Cosmos) (attributed).
- Quintus Horatius Flaccus (Horace), Carmina (Odes).
- Aulus Persius Flaccus, Satirae (Satires).
- Lucius Annaeus Seneca (Seneca the Younger), Naturales Quaestiones (Natural Questions).
- Gaius Plinius Secundus (Pliny the Elder), Historia Naturalis (Natural History).
- Decimus Junius Juvenalis, Satirae (Satires).
- Dictionary of Greek and Roman Antiquities, William Smith, ed., Little, Brown, and Company, Boston (1859).
- Harper's Dictionary of Classical Literature and Antiquities, Harry Thurston Peck, ed. (Second Edition, 1897).
