= Planet =

Large, round non-stellar astronomical object

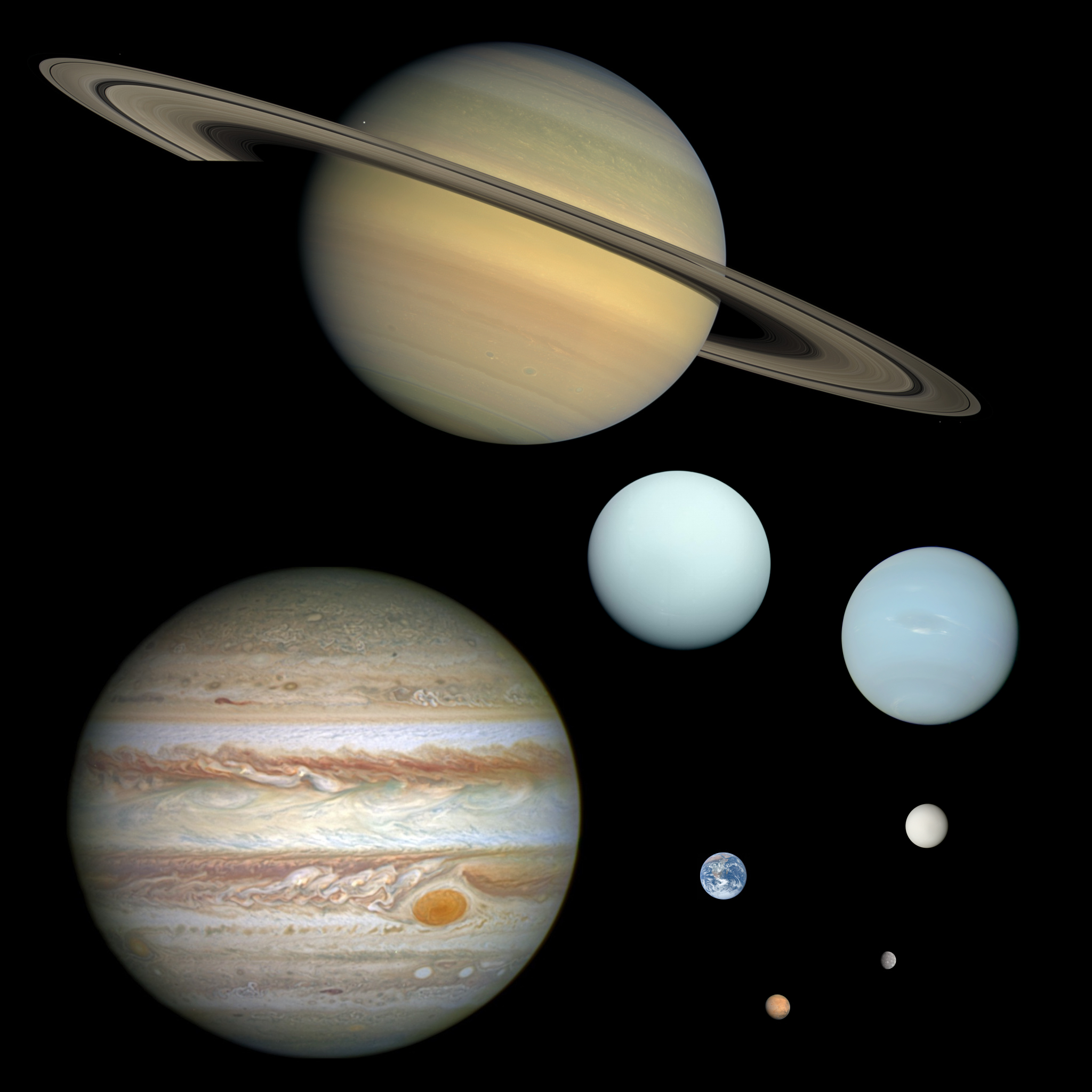
The eight planets of the Solar System with size to scale (up to down, left to right): Saturn, Jupiter, Uranus, Neptune (outer planets), Earth, Venus, Mars, and Mercury (inner planets)

A planet is a large, rounded astronomical body that is generally required to be in orbit around a star, stellar remnant, or brown dwarf, and is not one itself. The Solar System has eight planets by the most restrictive definition of the term: the terrestrial planets Mercury, Venus, Earth, and Mars, and the giant planets Jupiter, Saturn, Uranus, and Neptune. The best available theory of planet formation is the nebular hypothesis, which posits that an interstellar cloud collapses out of a nebula to create a young protostar orbited by a protoplanetary disk. Planets grow in this disk by the gradual accumulation of material driven by gravity, a process called accretion.

The word planet comes from the Greek πλανήται (planḗtai) 'wanderers'. In antiquity, this word referred to the Sun, Moon, and five points of light visible to the naked eye that moved across the background of the stars—namely, Mercury, Venus, Mars, Jupiter, and Saturn. Planets have historically had religious associations: multiple cultures identified celestial bodies with gods, and these connections with mythology and folklore persist in the schemes for naming newly discovered Solar System bodies. Earth itself was recognized as a planet when heliocentrism supplanted geocentrism during the 16th and 17th centuries.

With the development of the telescope, the meaning of planet broadened to include objects only visible with assistance: the moons of the planets beyond Earth; the ice giants Uranus and Neptune; Ceres and other bodies later recognized to be part of the asteroid belt; and Pluto, later found to be the largest member of the collection of icy bodies known as the Kuiper belt. The discovery of other large objects in the Kuiper belt, particularly Eris, spurred debate about how exactly to define a planet. In 2006, the International Astronomical Union (IAU) adopted a definition of a planet in the Solar System, placing the four terrestrial planets and the four giant planets in the planet category; Ceres, Pluto, and Eris are in the category of dwarf planet. Many planetary scientists have nonetheless continued to apply the term planet more broadly, including dwarf planets as well as rounded satellites like the Moon.

Further advances in astronomy have led to the discovery of about 6,464 planets outside the Solar System, termed exoplanets. These often show unusual features that the Solar System planets do not show, such as hot Jupiters—giant planets that orbit close to their parent stars, like 51 Pegasi b—and extremely eccentric orbits, such as HD 20782 b. The discovery of brown dwarfs and planets larger than Jupiter also spurred debate on the definition, regarding where exactly to draw the line between a planet and a star. Multiple exoplanets have been found to orbit in the habitable zones of their stars (where liquid water can potentially exist on a planetary surface), but Earth remains the only planet known to support life. Such a habitable zone is complicated by many factors, such as the atmospheric composition (if there is an atmosphere) of the planet; Mars, for example, has the temperature during the day to form liquid water on its surface on the equator, if only the pressure were higher.

== Formation ==
Artists' impressions

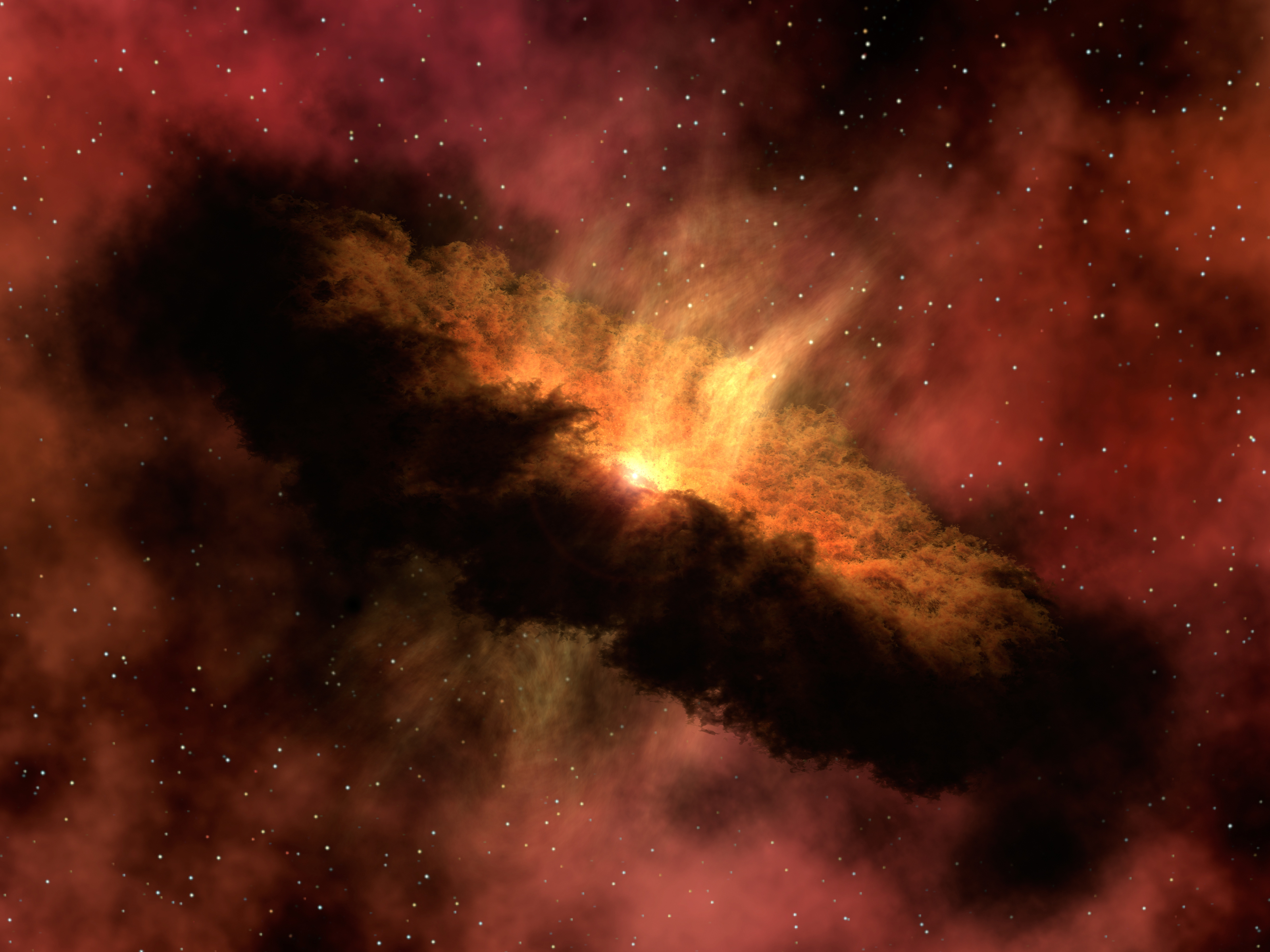
A protoplanetary disk

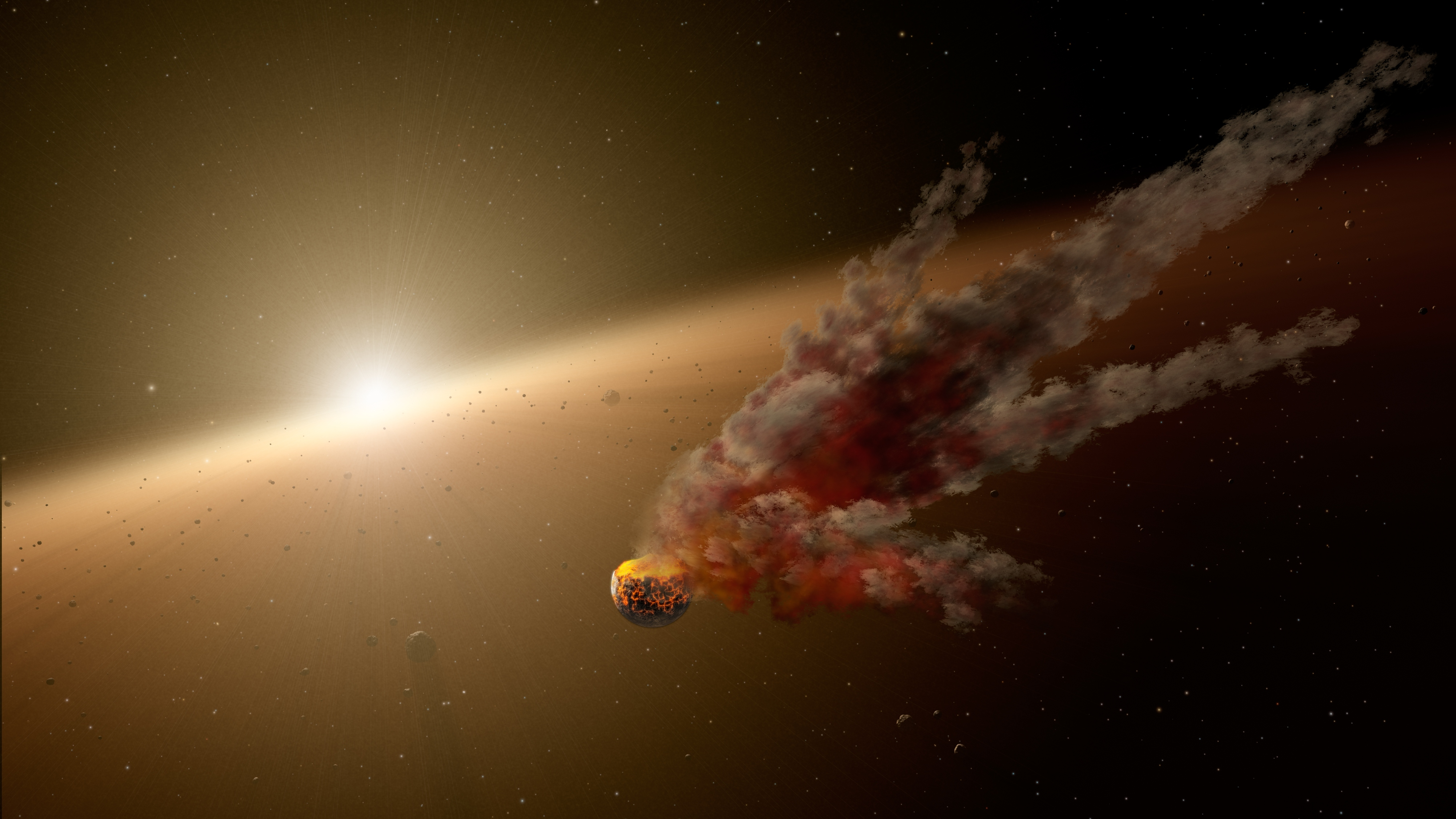
Protoplanets colliding during planet formation

It is not known with certainty how planets are formed. The prevailing theory is that they coalesce during the collapse of a nebula into a thin disk of gas and dust. A protostar forms at the core, surrounded by a rotating protoplanetary disk. Through accretion (a process of sticky collision) dust particles in the disk steadily accumulate mass to form ever-larger bodies. Local concentrations of mass known as planetesimals form, and these accelerate the accretion process by drawing in additional material by their gravitational attraction. These concentrations become increasingly dense until they collapse inward under gravity to form protoplanets. After a planet reaches a mass somewhat larger than Mars's mass, it begins to accumulate an extended atmosphere, greatly increasing the capture rate of the planetesimals by means of atmospheric drag. Depending on the accretion history of solids and gas, a giant planet, an ice giant, or a terrestrial planet may result. It is thought that the regular satellites of Jupiter, Saturn, and Uranus formed in a similar way; however, Triton was likely captured by Neptune, and Earth's Moon and Pluto's Charon might have formed in collisions.

When the protostar has grown such that it ignites to form a star, the surviving disk is removed from the inside outward by photoevaporation, the solar wind, Poynting–Robertson drag and other effects. Thereafter there still may be many protoplanets orbiting the star or each other, but over time many will collide, either to form a larger, combined protoplanet or release material for other protoplanets to absorb. Those objects that have become massive enough will capture most matter in their orbital neighbourhoods to become planets. Protoplanets that have avoided collisions may become natural satellites of planets through a process of gravitational capture, or remain in belts of other objects to become either dwarf planets or small bodies.

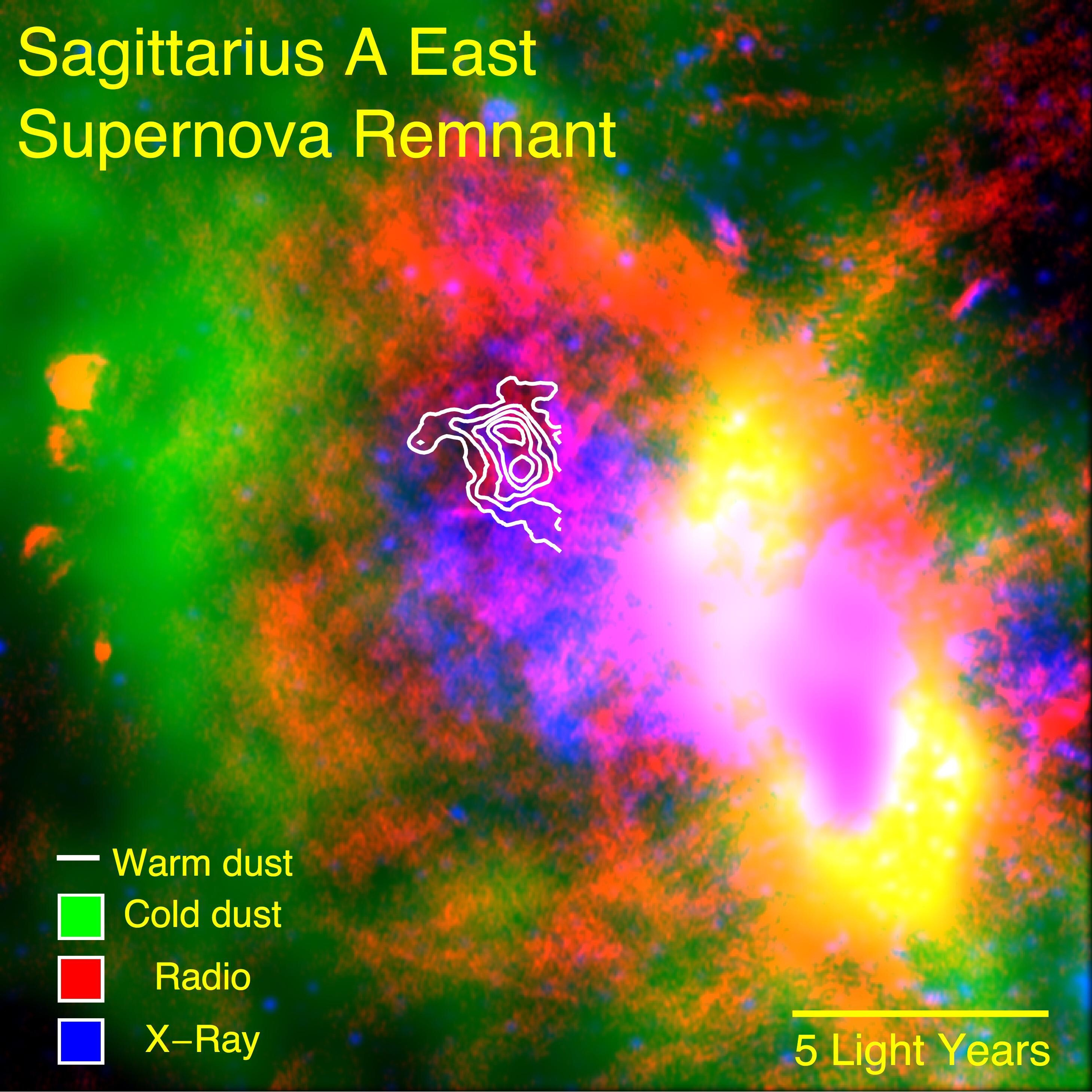
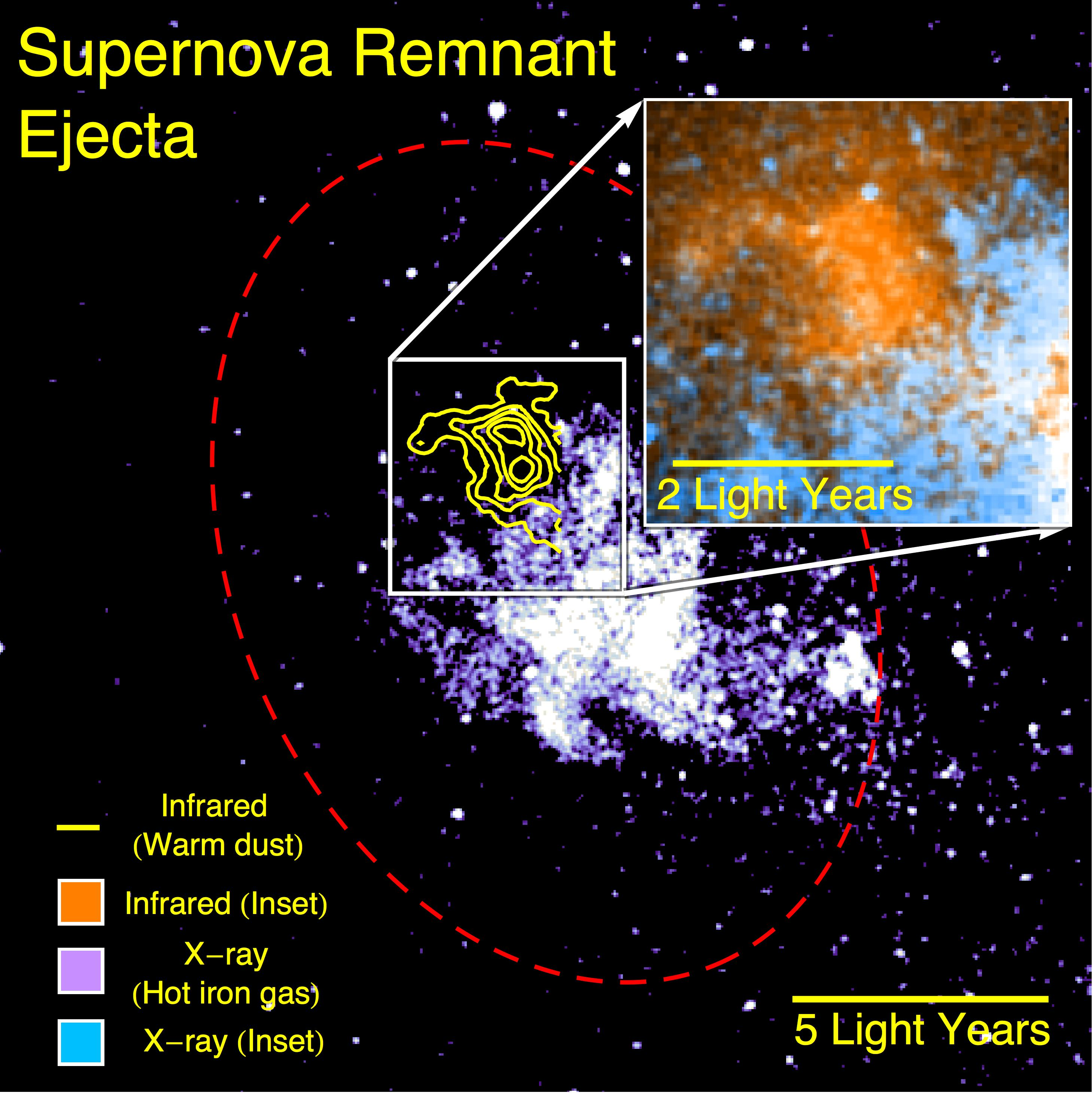
Supernova remnant ejecta producing planet-forming material

The energetic impacts of the smaller planetesimals (as well as radioactive decay) will heat up the growing planet, causing it to at least partially melt. The interior of the planet begins to differentiate by density, with higher density materials sinking toward the core. Smaller terrestrial planets lose most of their atmospheres because of this accretion, but the lost gases can be replaced by outgassing from the mantle and from the subsequent impact of comets (smaller planets will lose any atmosphere they gain through various escape mechanisms).

With the discovery and observation of planetary systems around stars other than the Sun, it is becoming possible to elaborate, revise or even replace this account. The level of metallicity—an astronomical term describing the abundance of chemical elements with an atomic number greater than 2 (helium)—appears to determine the likelihood that a star will have planets. Hence, a metal-rich population I star is more likely to have a substantial planetary system than a metal-poor, population II star.

== Planets in the Solar System ==
According to the IAU definition, there are eight planets in the Solar System, which are (in increasing distance from the Sun): Mercury, Venus, Earth, Mars, Jupiter, Saturn, Uranus, and Neptune. Jupiter is the largest, at 318 Earth masses, whereas Mercury is the smallest, at 0.055 Earth masses.

The planets of the Solar System can be divided into categories based on their composition. Terrestrials are similar to Earth, with bodies largely composed of rock and metal: Mercury, Venus, Earth, and Mars. Earth is the largest terrestrial planet. Giant planets are significantly more massive than the terrestrials: Jupiter, Saturn, Uranus, and Neptune. They differ from the terrestrial planets in composition. The gas giants, Jupiter and Saturn, are primarily composed of hydrogen and helium and are the most massive planets in the Solar System. Saturn is one third as massive as Jupiter, at 95 Earth masses. The ice giants, Uranus and Neptune, are primarily composed of low-boiling-point materials such as water, methane, and ammonia, with thick atmospheres of hydrogen and helium. They have a significantly lower mass than the gas giants (only 14 and 17 Earth masses).

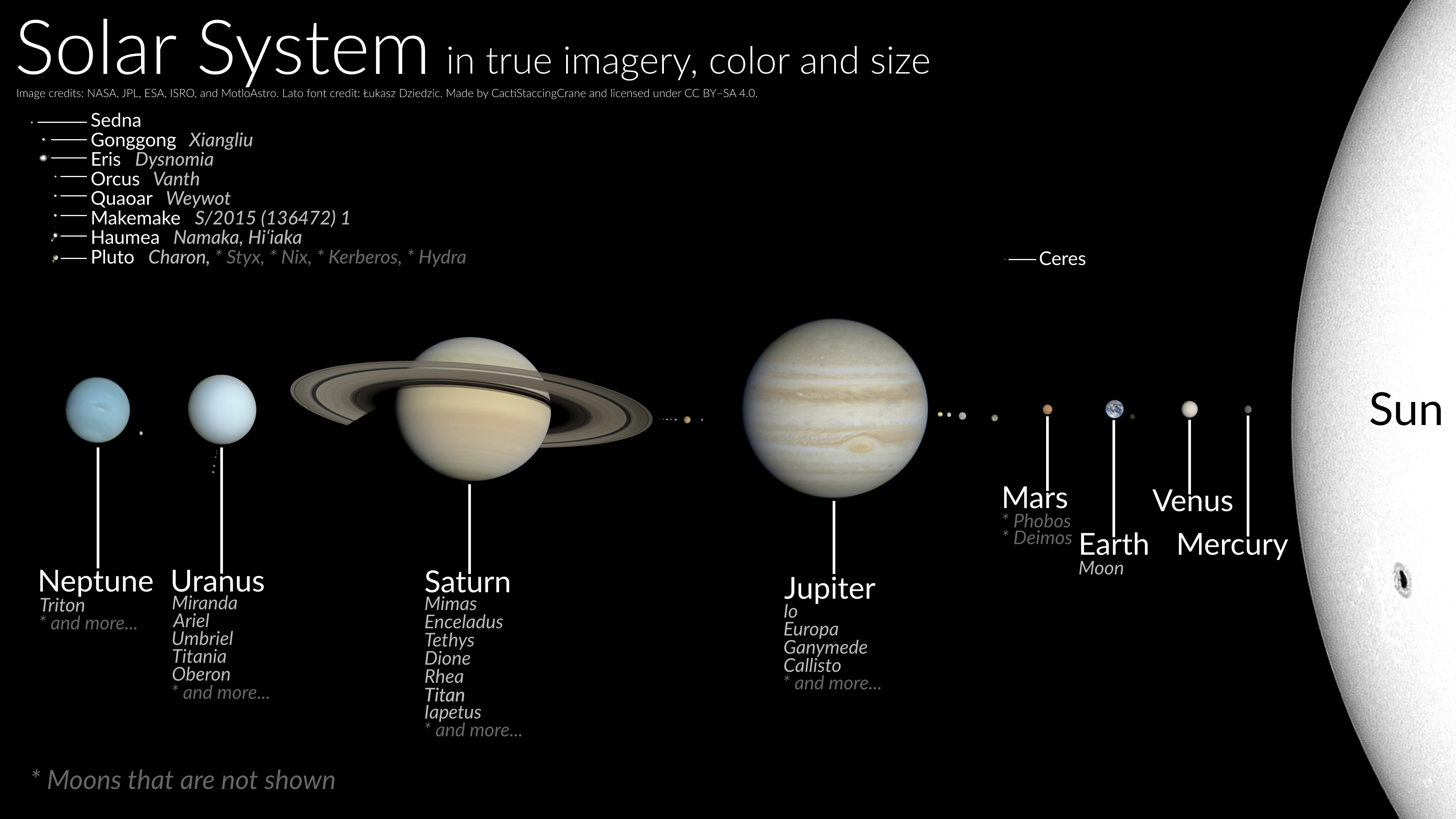
The Sun's, planets', dwarf planets' and moons' size to scale, labelled. Distance of objects is not to scale. The asteroid belt lies between the orbits of Mars and Jupiter, the Kuiper belt lies beyond Neptune's orbit.

Dwarf planets are gravitationally rounded, but have not cleared their orbits of other bodies. In increasing order of average distance from the Sun, the ones generally agreed among astronomers are Ceres, Orcus, Pluto, Haumea, Quaoar, Makemake, Gonggong, Eris, and Sedna. Ceres is the largest object in the asteroid belt, located between the orbits of Mars and Jupiter. The other eight all orbit beyond Neptune. Orcus, Pluto, Haumea, Quaoar, and Makemake orbit in the Kuiper belt, which is a second belt of small Solar System bodies beyond the orbit of Neptune. Gonggong and Eris orbit in the scattered disc, which is somewhat further out and, unlike the Kuiper belt, is unstable towards interactions with Neptune. Sedna is the largest known detached object, a population that never comes close enough to the Sun to interact with any of the classical planets; the origins of their orbits are still being debated. All nine are similar to terrestrial planets in having a solid surface, but they are made of ice and rock rather than rock and metal. Moreover, all of them are smaller than Mercury, with Pluto being the largest known dwarf planet and Eris being the most massive.

There are at least nineteen planetary-mass moons or satellite planets—moons large enough to take on ellipsoidal shapes:

- One satellite of Earth: the Moon
- Four satellites of Jupiter: Io, Europa, Ganymede, and Callisto
- Seven satellites of Saturn: Mimas, Enceladus, Tethys, Dione, Rhea, Titan, and Iapetus
- Five satellites of Uranus: Miranda, Ariel, Umbriel, Titania, and Oberon
- One satellite of Neptune: Triton
- One satellite of Pluto: Charon

The Moon, Io, and Europa have compositions similar to the terrestrial planets; the others are made of ice and rock like the dwarf planets, with Tethys being made of almost pure ice. Europa is often considered an icy planet, though, because its surface ice layer makes it difficult to study its interior. Ganymede and Titan are larger than Mercury by radius, and Callisto almost equals it, but all three are much less massive. Mimas is the smallest object generally agreed to be a geophysical planet, at about six millionths of Earth's mass, though there are many larger bodies that may not be geophysical planets (e.g. Salacia).

== Exoplanets ==
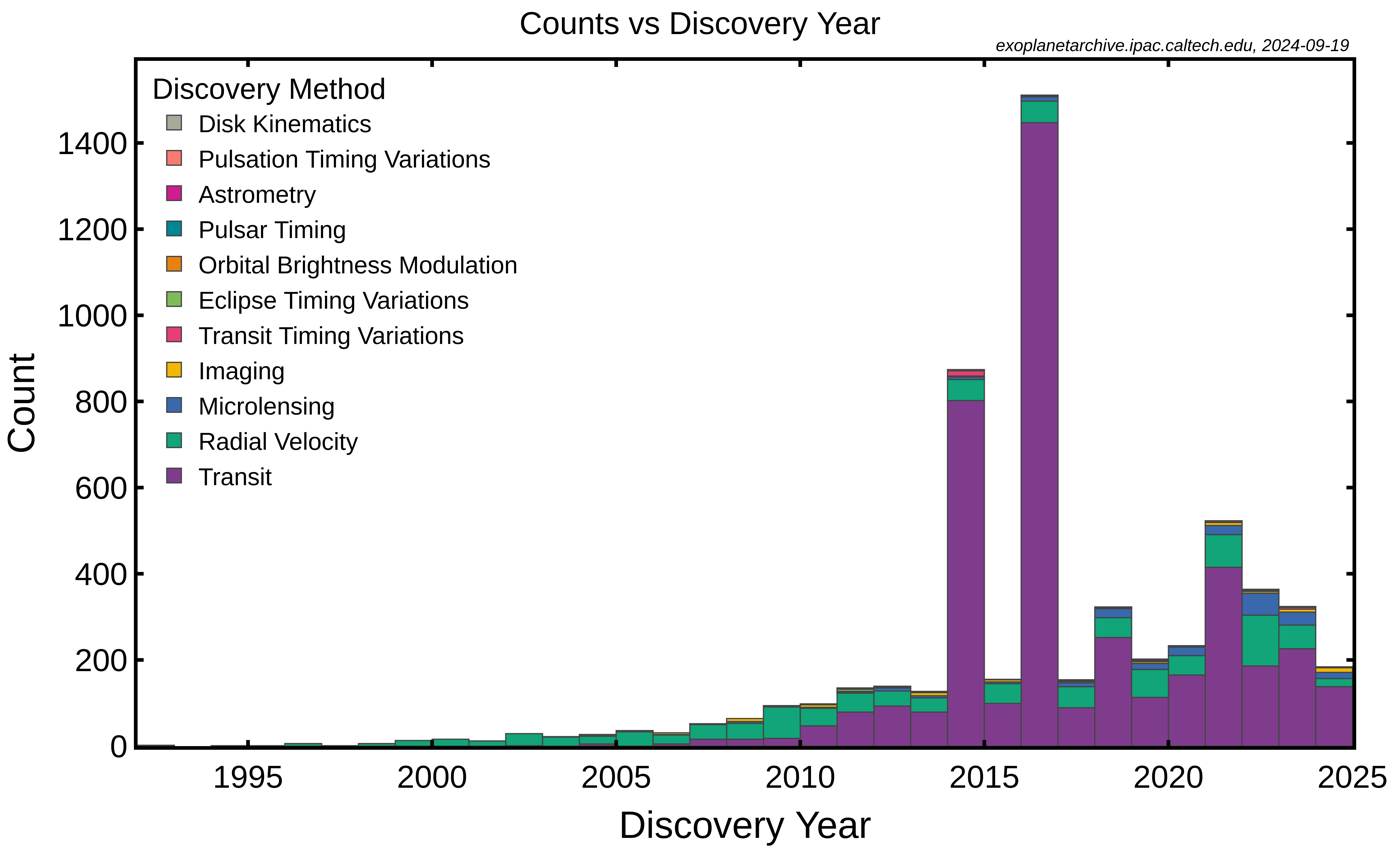
Exoplanet detections per year as of August 2023 (by NASA Exoplanet Archive)

An exoplanet is a planet outside the Solar System. As of 8 October 2026, there are 6,534 confirmed exoplanets in 4,908 planetary systems, with 1,080 systems having more than one planet. Known exoplanets range in size from gas giants about twice as large as Jupiter down to just over the size of the Moon. Analysis of gravitational microlensing data suggests a minimum average of 1.6 bound planets for every star in the Milky Way.

In early 1992, radio astronomers Aleksander Wolszczan and Dale Frail announced the discovery of two planets orbiting the pulsar PSR 1257+12. This discovery was confirmed and is generally considered to be the first definitive detection of exoplanets. Researchers suspect they formed from a disk remnant left over from the supernova that produced the pulsar.

The first confirmed discovery of an exoplanet orbiting an ordinary main-sequence star occurred on 6 October 1995, when Michel Mayor and Didier Queloz of the University of Geneva announced the detection of 51 Pegasi b, an exoplanet around 51 Pegasi. From then until the Kepler space telescope mission, most of the known exoplanets were gas giants comparable in mass to Jupiter or larger as they were more easily detected. The catalog of Kepler candidate planets consists mostly of planets the size of Neptune and smaller, down to smaller than Mercury.

In 2011, the Kepler space telescope team reported the discovery of the first Earth-sized exoplanets orbiting a Sun-like star, Kepler-20e and Kepler-20f. Since that time, more than 100 planets have been identified that are approximately the same size as Earth, 20 of which orbit in the habitable zone of their star—the range of orbits where a terrestrial planet could sustain liquid water on its surface, given enough atmospheric pressure. One in five Sun-like stars is thought to have an Earth-sized planet in its habitable zone, which suggests that the nearest would be expected to be within 12 light-years distance from Earth. (Note: Here, "Earth-sized" means 1–2 Earth radii, and "habitable zone" means the region with 0.25 to 4 times Earth's stellar flux (corresponding to 0.5–2 AU for the Sun). Data for G-type stars like the Sun is not available. This statistic is an extrapolation from data on K-type stars.) The frequency of occurrence of such terrestrial planets is one of the variables in the Drake equation, which estimates the number of intelligent, communicating civilizations that exist in the Milky Way.

There are types of planets that do not exist in the Solar System: super-Earths and mini-Neptunes, which have masses between that of Earth and Neptune. Objects less than about twice the mass of Earth are expected to be rocky like Earth; beyond that, they become a mixture of volatiles and gas like Neptune. The planet Gliese 581c, with a mass 5.5–10.4 times the mass of Earth, attracted attention upon its discovery for potentially being in the habitable zone, though later studies concluded that it is actually too close to its star to be habitable. Planets more massive than Jupiter are also known, extending seamlessly into the realm of brown dwarfs.

Exoplanets have been found that are much closer to their parent star than any planet in the Solar System is to the Sun. Mercury, the closest planet to the Sun at 0.4 AU, takes 88 days for an orbit, but ultra-short period planets can orbit in less than a day. The Kepler-11 system has five of its planets in shorter orbits than Mercury's, all of them much more massive than Mercury. There are hot Jupiters, such as 51 Pegasi b, that orbit very close to their star and may evaporate to become chthonian planets, which are the leftover cores. There are also exoplanets that are much farther from their star. Neptune is 30 AU from the Sun and takes 165 years to orbit, but there are exoplanets that are thousands of AU from their star and take more than a million years to orbit (e.g. COCONUTS-2b).

== Attributes ==
Although each planet has unique physical characteristics, a number of broad commonalities do exist among them. Some of these characteristics, such as rings or natural satellites, have only as yet been observed in planets in the Solar System, whereas others are commonly observed in exoplanets.

=== Dynamic characteristics ===
==== Orbit ====
The orbit of the planet Neptune compared to that of Pluto. Note the elongation of Pluto's orbit in relation to Neptune's (eccentricity), as well as its large angle to the ecliptic (inclination).

In the Solar System, all the planets orbit the Sun in the same direction as the Sun rotates: counter-clockwise as seen from above the Sun's north pole. At least one exoplanet, WASP-17b, has been found to orbit in the opposite direction to its star's rotation. The period of one revolution of a planet's orbit is known as its sidereal period or year. A planet's year depends on its distance from its star; the farther a planet is from its star, the longer the distance it must travel and the slower its speed, since it is less affected by its star's gravity.

No planet's orbit is perfectly circular, and hence the distance of each from the host star varies over the course of its year. The closest approach to its star is called its periastron, or perihelion in the Solar System, whereas its farthest separation from the star is called its apastron (aphelion). As a planet approaches periastron, its speed increases as it trades gravitational potential energy for kinetic energy, just as a falling object on Earth accelerates as it falls. As the planet nears apastron, its speed decreases, just as an object thrown upwards on Earth slows down as it reaches the apex of its trajectory.

Each planet's orbit is delineated by a set of elements:

- The eccentricity of an orbit describes the elongation of a planet's elliptical (oval) orbit. Planets with low eccentricities have more circular orbits, whereas planets with high eccentricities have more elliptical orbits. The planets and large moons in the Solar System have relatively low eccentricities, and thus nearly circular orbits. The comets and many Kuiper belt objects, as well as several exoplanets, have very high eccentricities, and thus exceedingly elliptical orbits.
- The semi-major axis gives the size of the orbit. It is the distance from the midpoint to the longest diameter of its elliptical orbit. This distance is not the same as its apastron, because no planet's orbit has its star at its exact centre.
- The inclination of a planet tells how far above or below an established reference plane its orbit is tilted. In the Solar System, the reference plane is the plane of Earth's orbit, called the ecliptic. For exoplanets, the plane, known as the sky plane or plane of the sky, is the plane perpendicular to the observer's line of sight from Earth. The orbits of the eight major planets of the Solar System all lie very close to the ecliptic; however, some smaller objects like Pallas, Pluto, and Eris orbit at far more extreme angles to it, as do comets. The large moons are generally not very inclined to their parent planets' equators, but Earth's Moon, Saturn's Iapetus, and Neptune's Triton are exceptions. Triton is unique among the large moons in that it orbits retrograde, i.e. in the direction opposite to its parent planet's rotation.
- The points at which a planet crosses above and below its reference plane are called its ascending and descending nodes. The longitude of the ascending node is the angle between the reference plane's 0 longitude and the planet's ascending node. The argument of periapsis (or perihelion in the Solar System) is the angle between a planet's ascending node and its closest approach to its star.

==== Axial tilt ====
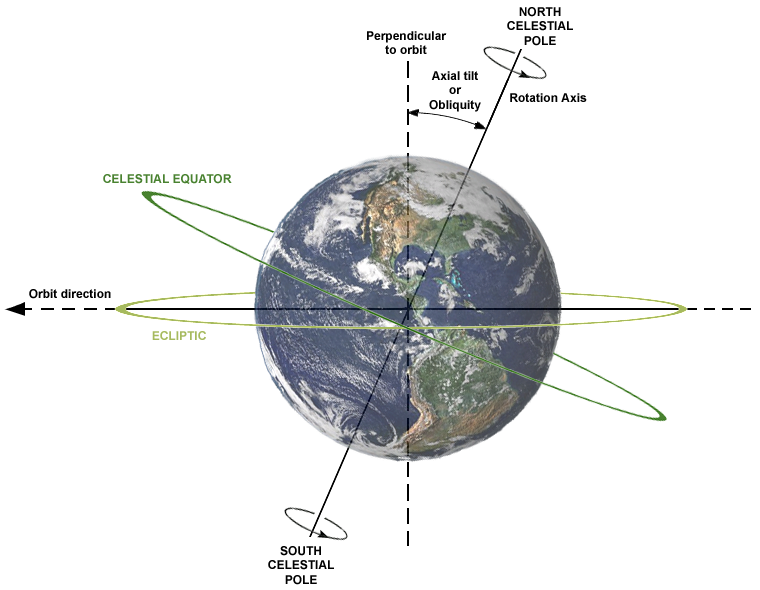
Earth's axial tilt is about 23.4°. It oscillates between 22.1° and 24.5° on a 41,000-year cycle and is currently decreasing.

Planets have varying degrees of axial tilt; they spin at an angle to the plane of their stars' equators. This causes the amount of light received by each hemisphere to vary over the course of its year; when the Northern Hemisphere points away from its star, the Southern Hemisphere points towards it, and vice versa. Each planet therefore has seasons, resulting in changes to the climate over the course of its year. The time at which each hemisphere points farthest or nearest from its star is known as its solstice. Each planet has two in the course of its orbit; when one hemisphere has its summer solstice with its day being the longest, the other has its winter solstice when its day is shortest. The varying amount of light and heat received by each hemisphere creates annual changes in weather patterns for each half of the planet. Jupiter's axial tilt is very small, so its seasonal variation is minimal; Uranus, on the other hand, has an axial tilt so extreme it is virtually on its side, which means that its hemispheres are either continually in sunlight or continually in darkness around the time of its solstices. In the Solar System, Mercury, Venus, Ceres, and Jupiter have very small tilts; Pallas, Uranus, and Pluto have extreme ones; and Earth, Mars, Vesta, Saturn, and Neptune have moderate ones. Among exoplanets, axial tilts are not known for certain, though most hot Jupiters are believed to have a negligible axial tilt as a result of their proximity to their stars. Similarly, the axial tilts of the planetary-mass moons are near zero, with Earth's Moon at 6.687° as the biggest exception; additionally, Callisto's axial tilt varies between 0 and about 2 degrees on timescales of thousands of years.

==== Rotation ====
The planets rotate around invisible axes through their centres. A planet's rotation period is known as a stellar day. Most of the planets in the Solar System rotate in the same direction as they orbit the Sun, which is counter-clockwise as seen from above the Sun's north pole. The exceptions are Venus and Uranus, which rotate clockwise, though Uranus's extreme axial tilt means there are differing conventions on which of its poles is "north", and therefore whether it is rotating clockwise or anti-clockwise. Regardless of which convention is used, Uranus has a retrograde rotation relative to its orbit.

Comparison of the rotation period (sped up 10 000 times, negative values denoting retrograde), flattening and axial tilt of the planets and the Moon (SVG animation)

The rotation of a planet can be induced by several factors during formation. A net angular momentum can be induced by the individual angular momentum contributions of accreted objects. The accretion of gas by the giant planets contributes to the angular momentum. Finally, during the last stages of planet building, a stochastic process of protoplanetary accretion can randomly alter the spin axis of the planet. There is great variation in the length of day between the planets, with Venus taking 243 days to rotate, and the giant planets only a few hours. The rotational periods of exoplanets are not known, but for hot Jupiters, their proximity to their stars means that they are tidally locked (that is, their orbits are in sync with their rotations). This means, they always show one face to their stars, with one side in perpetual day, the other in perpetual night. Mercury and Venus, the closest planets to the Sun, similarly exhibit very slow rotation: Mercury is tidally locked into a 3:2 spin–orbit resonance (rotating three times for every two revolutions around the Sun), and Venus's rotation may be in equilibrium between tidal forces slowing it down and atmospheric tides created by solar heating speeding it up.

All the large moons are tidally locked to their parent planets; Pluto and Charon are tidally locked to each other, as are Eris and Dysnomia, and probably Orcus and its moon Vanth. The other dwarf planets with known rotation periods rotate faster than Earth; Haumea rotates so fast that it has been distorted into a triaxial ellipsoid. The exoplanet Tau Boötis b and its parent star Tau Boötis appear to be mutually tidally locked.

==== Orbital clearing ====
The defining dynamic characteristic of a planet, according to the IAU definition, is that it has cleared its neighborhood. A planet that has cleared its neighborhood has accumulated enough mass to gather up or sweep away all the planetesimals in its orbit. In effect, it orbits its star in isolation, as opposed to sharing its orbit with a multitude of similar-sized objects. As described above, this characteristic was mandated as part of the IAU's official definition of a planet in August 2006. Although to date this criterion only applies to the Solar System, a number of young extrasolar systems have been found in which evidence suggests orbital clearing is taking place within their circumstellar discs.

=== Physical characteristics ===
==== Size and shape ====
Gravity causes planets to be pulled into a roughly spherical shape, so a planet's size can be expressed roughly by an average radius (for example, Earth radius or Jupiter radius). However, planets are not perfectly spherical; for example, the Earth's rotation causes it to be slightly flattened at the poles with a bulge around the equator. Therefore, a better approximation of Earth's shape is an oblate spheroid, whose equatorial diameter is 43 kilometers (27 mi) larger than the pole-to-pole diameter. Generally, a planet's shape may be described by giving polar and equatorial radii of a spheroid or specifying a reference ellipsoid. From such a specification, the planet's flattening, surface area, and volume can be calculated; its normal gravity can be computed knowing its size, shape, rotation rate, and mass.

==== Mass ====
A planet's defining physical characteristic is that it is massive enough for the force of its own gravity to dominate over the electromagnetic forces binding its physical structure, leading to a state of hydrostatic equilibrium. This effectively means that all planets are spherical or spheroidal. Up to a certain mass, an object can be irregular in shape, but beyond that point, which varies depending on the chemical makeup of the object, gravity begins to pull an object towards its own centre of mass until the object collapses into a sphere.

Mass is the prime attribute by which planets are distinguished from stars. No objects between the masses of the Sun and Jupiter exist in the Solar System, but there are exoplanets of this size. The lower stellar mass limit is estimated to be around 75 to 80 times that of Jupiter (M_{J}). Some authors advocate that this be used as the upper limit for planethood, on the grounds that the internal physics of objects does not change between approximately one Saturn mass (beginning of significant self-compression) and the onset of hydrogen burning and becoming a red dwarf star. Beyond roughly 13 M_{J} (at least for objects with solar-type isotopic abundance), an object achieves conditions suitable for nuclear fusion of deuterium: this has sometimes been advocated as a boundary, even though deuterium burning does not last very long and most brown dwarfs have long since finished burning their deuterium. This is not universally agreed upon: the exoplanets Encyclopaedia includes objects up to 60 M_{J}, and the Exoplanet Data Explorer up to 24 M_{J}.

The smallest known exoplanet with an accurately known mass is PSR B1257+12A, one of the first exoplanets discovered, which was found in 1992 in orbit around a pulsar. Its mass is roughly half that of the planet Mercury. Even smaller is WD 1145+017 b, orbiting a white dwarf; its mass is roughly that of the dwarf planet Haumea, and it is typically termed a minor planet. The smallest known planet orbiting a main-sequence star other than the Sun is Kepler-37b, with a mass (and radius) that is probably slightly higher than that of the Moon. The smallest object in the Solar System generally agreed to be a geophysical planet is Saturn's moon Mimas, with a radius about 3.1% of Earth's and a mass about 0.00063% of Earth's. Saturn's smaller moon Phoebe, currently an irregular body of 1.7% Earth's radius and 0.00014% Earth's mass, is thought to have attained hydrostatic equilibrium and differentiation early in its history before being battered out of shape by impacts. Some asteroids may be fragments of protoplanets that began to accrete and differentiate, but suffered catastrophic collisions, leaving only a metallic or rocky core today, or a reaccumulation of the resulting debris.

==== Internal differentiation ====
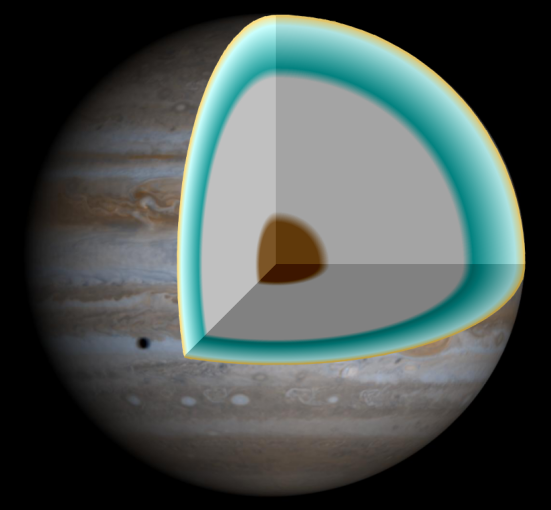
Illustration of the interior of Jupiter, with a rocky core overlaid by a deep layer of metallic hydrogen

Every planet began its existence in an entirely fluid state; in early formation, the denser, heavier materials sank to the centre, leaving the lighter materials near the surface. Each therefore has a differentiated interior consisting of a dense planetary core surrounded by a mantle that either is or was a fluid. The terrestrial planets' mantles are sealed within hard crusts, but in the giant planets the mantle simply blends into the upper cloud layers. The terrestrial planets have cores of elements such as iron and nickel and mantles of silicates. Jupiter and Saturn are believed to have cores of rock and metal surrounded by mantles of metallic hydrogen. Uranus and Neptune, which are smaller, have rocky cores surrounded by mantles of water, ammonia, methane, and other ices. The fluid action within these planets' cores creates a geodynamo that generates a magnetic field. Similar differentiation processes are believed to have occurred on some of the large moons and dwarf planets, though the process may not always have been completed: Ceres, Callisto, and Titan appear to be incompletely differentiated. The asteroid Vesta, though not a dwarf planet because it was battered by impacts out of roundness, has a differentiated interior similar to that of Venus, Earth, and Mars.

==== Atmosphere ====
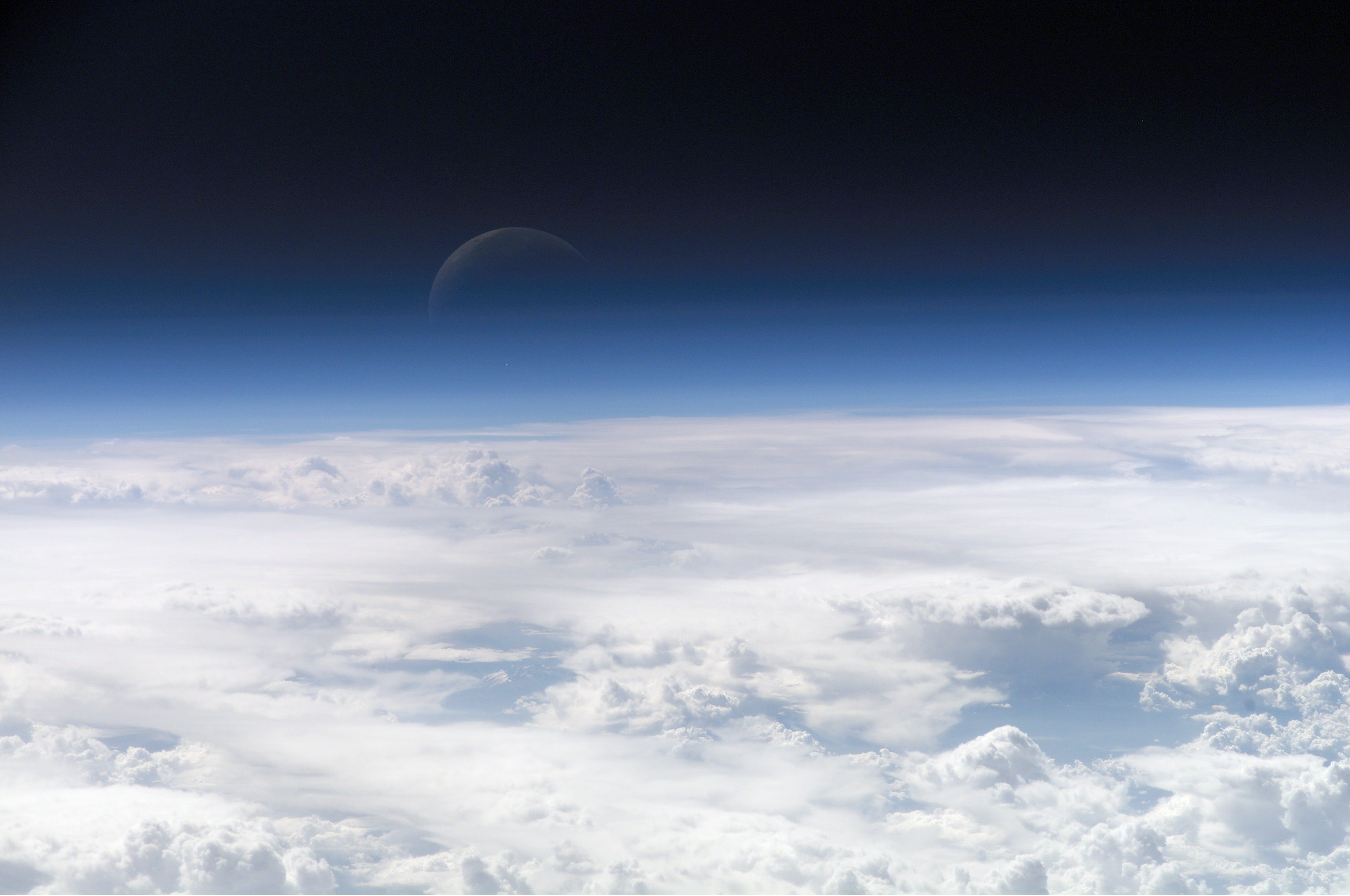
Earth's atmosphere

All of the Solar System planets except Mercury have substantial atmospheres because their gravity is strong enough to keep gases close to the surface. Saturn's largest moon Titan also has a substantial atmosphere thicker than that of Earth; Neptune's largest moon Triton and the dwarf planet Pluto have more tenuous atmospheres. The larger giant planets are massive enough to keep large amounts of the light gases hydrogen and helium, whereas the smaller planets lose these gases into space. Analysis of exoplanets suggests that the threshold for being able to hold on to these light gases occurs at about 2.0+0.7
−0.6 M_{🜨}, so that Earth and Venus are near the maximum size for rocky planets.

The composition of Earth's atmosphere is different from the other planets because the various life processes that have transpired on the planet have introduced free molecular oxygen. The atmospheres of Mars and Venus are both dominated by carbon dioxide, but differ drastically in density: the average surface pressure of Mars's atmosphere is less than 1% that of Earth's (too low to allow liquid water to exist), while the average surface pressure of Venus's atmosphere is about 92 times that of Earth's. It is likely that Venus's atmosphere was the result of a runaway greenhouse effect in its history, which today makes it the hottest planet by surface temperature, hotter even than Mercury. Despite hostile surface conditions, temperature and pressure at about 50–55 km altitude in Venus's atmosphere are close to Earthlike conditions (the only place in the Solar System beyond Earth where this is so), and this region has been suggested as a plausible base for future human exploration. Titan has the only dense nitrogen-rich planetary atmosphere in the Solar System other than Earth's. Just as Earth's conditions are close to the triple point of water, allowing it to exist in all three states on the planet's surface, so Titan's are to the triple point of methane.

Planetary atmospheres are affected by the varying insolation or internal energy, leading to the formation of dynamic weather systems such as hurricanes (on Earth), planet-wide dust storms (on Mars), a greater-than-Earth-sized anticyclone on Jupiter (called the Great Red Spot), and holes in the atmosphere (on Neptune). Weather patterns detected on exoplanets include a hot region on HD 189733 b twice the size of the Great Red Spot, as well as clouds on the hot Jupiter Kepler-7b, the super-Earth Gliese 1214 b, and others.

Hot Jupiters, due to their extreme proximities to their host stars, have been shown to be losing their atmospheres into space due to stellar radiation, much like the tails of comets. These planets may have vast differences in temperature between their day and night sides that produce supersonic winds, although multiple factors are involved and the details of the atmospheric dynamics that affect the day-night temperature difference are complex.

==== Magnetosphere ====
Earth's magnetosphere (diagram)

One important characteristic of the planets is their intrinsic magnetic moments, which in turn give rise to magnetospheres. The presence of a magnetic field indicates that the planet is still geologically alive. In other words, magnetized planets have flows of electrically conducting material in their interiors, which generate their magnetic fields. These fields significantly change the interaction of the planet and solar wind. A magnetized planet creates a cavity in the solar wind around itself called the magnetosphere, which the wind cannot penetrate. The magnetosphere can be much larger than the planet itself. In contrast, non-magnetized planets have only small magnetospheres induced by interaction of the ionosphere with the solar wind, which cannot effectively protect the planet.

Of the eight planets in the Solar System, only Venus and Mars lack such a magnetic field. Of the magnetized planets, the magnetic field of Mercury is the weakest and is barely able to deflect the solar wind. Jupiter's moon Ganymede has a magnetic field several times stronger, and Jupiter's is the strongest in the Solar System (so intense in fact that it poses a serious health risk to future crewed missions to all its moons inward of Callisto). The magnetic fields of the other giant planets, measured at their surfaces, are roughly similar in strength to that of Earth, but their magnetic moments are significantly larger. The magnetic fields of Uranus and Neptune are strongly tilted relative to the planets' rotational axes and displaced from the planets' centres.

In 2003, a team of astronomers in Hawaii observing the star HD 179949 detected a bright spot on its surface, apparently created by the magnetosphere of an orbiting hot Jupiter.

=== Secondary characteristics ===
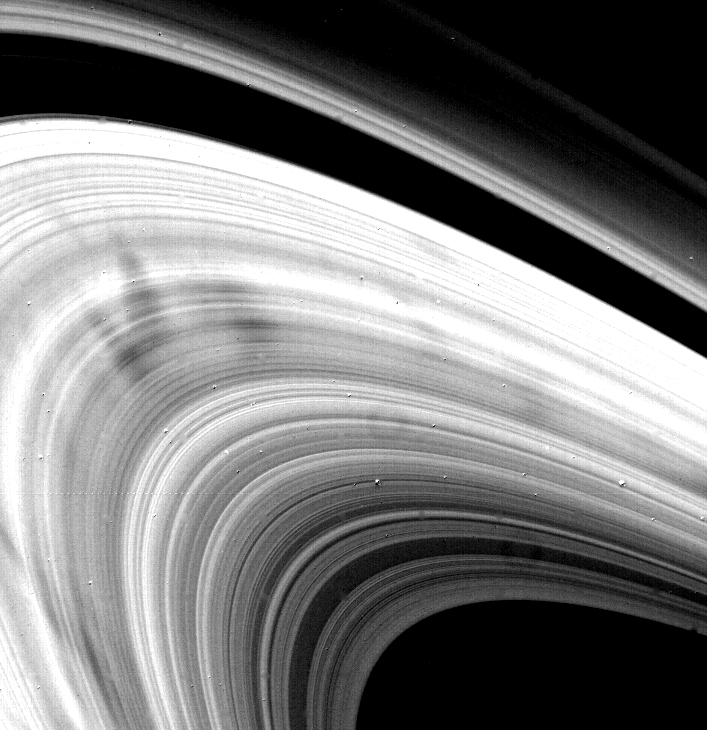
The rings of Saturn

Several planets or dwarf planets in the Solar System (such as Neptune and Pluto) have orbital periods that are in resonance with each other or with smaller bodies. This is common in satellite systems (e.g. the resonance between Io, Europa, and Ganymede around Jupiter, or between Enceladus and Dione around Saturn). All except Mercury and Venus have natural satellites, often called "moons". Earth has one, Mars has two, and the giant planets have numerous moons in complex planetary-type systems. Except for Ceres and Sedna, all the consensus dwarf planets are known to have at least one moon as well. Many moons of the giant planets have features similar to those on the terrestrial planets and dwarf planets, and some have been studied as possible abodes of life (especially Europa and Enceladus).

The four giant planets are orbited by planetary rings of varying size and complexity. The rings are composed primarily of dust or particulate matter, but can host tiny 'moonlets' whose gravity shapes and maintains their structure. Although the origins of planetary rings are not precisely known, they are believed to be the result of natural satellites that fell below their parent planets' Roche limits and were torn apart by tidal forces. The dwarf planets Haumea and Quaoar also have rings.

No secondary characteristics have been observed around exoplanets. The sub-brown dwarf Cha 110913−773444, which has been described as a rogue planet, is believed to be orbited by a tiny protoplanetary disc, and the sub-brown dwarf OTS 44 was shown to be surrounded by a substantial protoplanetary disk of at least 10 Earth masses.

== History and etymology ==
The idea of planets has evolved over the history of astronomy, from the divine lights of antiquity to the earthly objects of the scientific age. The concept has expanded to include worlds not only in the Solar System, but in multitudes of other extrasolar systems. The consensus as to what counts as a planet, as opposed to other objects, has changed several times. It previously encompassed asteroids, moons, and dwarf planets like Pluto, and there continues to be some disagreement today.

=== Ancient civilizations and classical planets ===
The motion of 'lights' moving across the sky is the basis of the classical definition of planets: wandering stars.

The five classical planets of the Solar System, being visible to the naked eye, have been known since ancient times and have had a significant impact on mythology, religious cosmology, and ancient astronomy. In ancient times, astronomers noted how certain lights moved across the sky, as opposed to the "fixed stars", which maintained a constant relative position in the sky. Ancient Greeks called these lights πλάνητες ἀστέρες (planētes asteres) 'wandering stars' or simply πλανῆται (planētai) 'wanderers' from which today's word "planet" was derived. In ancient Greece, China, Babylon, and indeed all pre-modern civilizations, it was almost universally believed that Earth was the center of the Universe and that all the "planets" circled Earth. The reasons for this perception were that stars and planets appeared to revolve around Earth each day and the apparently common-sense perceptions that Earth was solid and stable and that it was not moving but at rest.

==== Babylon ====
The first civilization known to have a functional theory of the planets were the Babylonians, who lived in Mesopotamia in the first and second millennia BC. The oldest surviving planetary astronomical text is the Babylonian Venus tablet of Ammisaduqa, a 7th-century BC copy of a list of observations of the motions of the planet Venus, that probably dates as early as the second millennium BC. The MUL.APIN is a pair of cuneiform tablets dating from the 7th century BC that lays out the motions of the Sun, Moon, and planets over the course of the year. Late Babylonian astronomy is the origin of Western astronomy and indeed all Western efforts in the exact sciences. The Enuma anu enlil, written during the Neo-Assyrian period in the 7th century BC, comprises a list of omens and their relationships with various celestial phenomena including the motions of the planets. The inferior planets Venus and Mercury and the superior planets Mars, Jupiter, and Saturn were all identified by Babylonian astronomers. These would remain the only known planets until the invention of the telescope in early modern times.

==== Greco-Roman astronomy ====
The ancient Greeks initially did not attach as much significance to the planets as the Babylonians. In the 6th and 5th centuries BC, the Pythagoreans appear to have developed their own independent planetary theory, which consisted of the Earth, Sun, Moon, and planets revolving around a "Central Fire" at the center of the Universe. Pythagoras or Parmenides is said to have been the first to identify the evening star (Hesperos) and morning star (Phosphoros) as one and the same (Aphrodite, Greek corresponding to Latin Venus), though this had long been known in Mesopotamia. In the 3rd century BC, Aristarchus of Samos proposed a heliocentric system, according to which Earth and the planets revolved around the Sun. The geocentric system remained dominant until the Scientific Revolution.

By the 1st century BC, during the Hellenistic period, the Greeks had begun to develop their own mathematical schemes for predicting the positions of the planets. These schemes, which were based on geometry rather than the arithmetic of the Babylonians, would eventually eclipse the Babylonians' theories in complexity and comprehensiveness and account for most of the astronomical movements observed from Earth with the naked eye. These theories would reach their fullest expression in the Almagest written by Ptolemy in the 2nd century CE. So complete was the domination of Ptolemy's model that it superseded all previous works on astronomy and remained the definitive astronomical text in the Western world for 13 centuries. To the Greeks and Romans, there were seven known planets, each presumed to be circling Earth according to the complex laws laid out by Ptolemy. They were, in increasing order from Earth (in Ptolemy's order and using modern names): the Moon, Mercury, Venus, the Sun, Mars, Jupiter, and Saturn.

=== Medieval astronomy ===
1660 illustration of Claudius Ptolemy's geocentric model

After the fall of the Western Roman Empire, astronomy developed further in India and the medieval Islamic world. In 499 CE, the Indian astronomer Aryabhata propounded a planetary model that explicitly incorporated Earth's rotation about its axis, which he explains as the cause of what appears to be an apparent westward motion of the stars. He also theorized that the orbits of planets were elliptical. Aryabhata's followers were particularly strong in South India, where his principles of the diurnal rotation of Earth, among others, were followed and a number of secondary works were based on them.

The astronomy of the Islamic Golden Age mostly took place in the Middle East, Central Asia, Al-Andalus, and North Africa, and later in the Far East and India. These astronomers, like the polymath Ibn al-Haytham, generally accepted geocentrism, although they did dispute Ptolemy's system of epicycles and sought alternatives. The 10th-century astronomer Abu Sa'id al-Sijzi accepted that the Earth rotates around its axis. In the 11th century, the transit of Venus was observed by Avicenna. His contemporary Al-Biruni devised a method of determining the Earth's radius using trigonometry that, unlike the older method of Eratosthenes, only required observations at a single mountain.

=== Scientific Revolution and discovery of outer planets ===
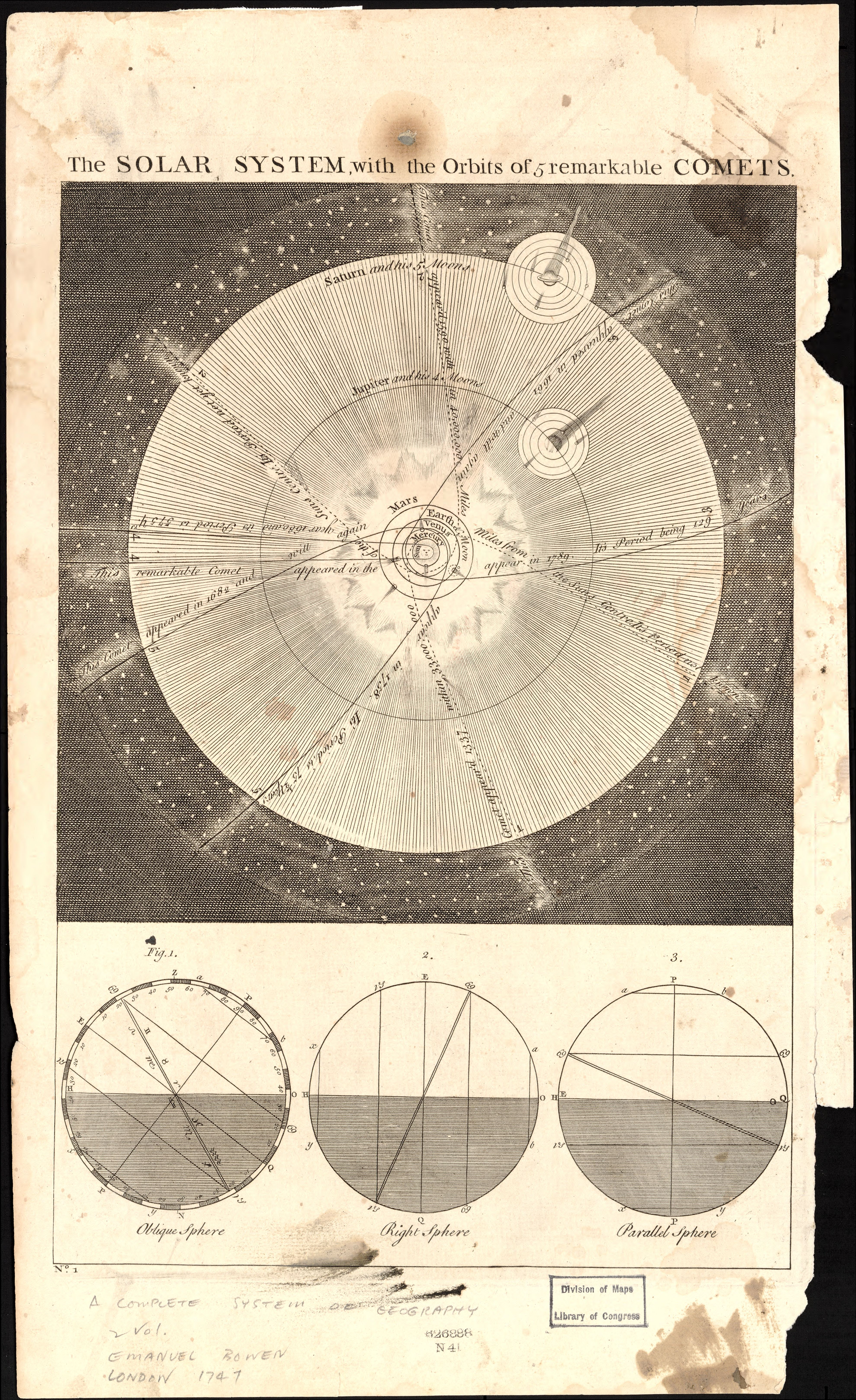
True-scale Solar System poster made by Emanuel Bowen in 1747. At that time, Uranus, Neptune, and the asteroid belts had all not yet been discovered.

With the advent of the Scientific Revolution and the heliocentric model of Copernicus, Galileo, and Kepler, use of the term "planet" changed from something that moved around the sky relative to the fixed stars to a body that orbited the Sun, directly (a primary planet) or indirectly (a secondary or satellite planet). Thus the Earth was added to the roster of planets, and the Sun was removed. The Copernican count of primary planets stood until 1781, when William Herschel discovered Uranus.

When four satellites of Jupiter (the Galilean moons) and five of Saturn were discovered in the 17th century, they joined Earth's Moon in the category of "satellite planets" or "secondary planets" orbiting the primary planets, though in the following decades they would come to be called simply "satellites" for short. Scientists generally considered planetary satellites to also be planets until about the 1920s, although this usage was not common among non-scientists.

In the first decade of the 19th century, four new "planets" were discovered: Ceres (in 1801), Pallas (in 1802), Juno (in 1804), and Vesta (in 1807). It soon became apparent that they were rather different from previously known planets: they shared the same general region of space, between Mars and Jupiter (the asteroid belt), with sometimes overlapping orbits. This was an area where only one planet had been expected, and they were much smaller than all other planets; indeed, it was suspected that they might be shards of a larger planet that had broken up. Herschel called them asteroids (from the Greek for "starlike") because even in the largest telescopes they resembled stars, without a resolvable disk.

The situation was stable for four decades, but in the 1840s several additional asteroids were discovered (Astraea in 1845; Hebe, Iris, and Flora in 1847; Metis in 1848; and Hygiea in 1849). New "planets" were discovered every year; as a result, astronomers began tabulating the asteroids (minor planets) separately from the major planets and assigning them numbers instead of abstract planetary symbols, although they continued to be considered as small planets.

Neptune was discovered in 1846, its position having been predicted thanks to its gravitational influence upon Uranus. Because the orbit of Mercury appeared to be affected in a similar way, it was believed in the late 19th century that there might be another planet even closer to the Sun. However, the discrepancy between Mercury's orbit and the predictions of Newtonian gravity was instead explained by an improved theory of gravity, Einstein's general relativity.

Pluto was discovered in 1930. After initial observations led to the belief that it was larger than Earth, the object was immediately accepted as the ninth major planet. Further monitoring found the body was actually much smaller: in 1936, Ray Lyttleton suggested that Pluto may be an escaped satellite of Neptune, and Fred Whipple suggested in 1964 that Pluto may be a comet. The discovery of its large moon Charon in 1978 showed that Pluto was only 0.2% the mass of Earth. As this was still substantially more massive than any known asteroid, and because no other trans-Neptunian objects had been discovered at that time, Pluto kept its planetary status, only officially losing it in 2006.

In the 1950s, Gerard Kuiper published papers on the origin of the asteroids. He recognized that asteroids were typically not spherical, as had previously been thought, and that the asteroid families were remnants of collisions. Thus he differentiated between the largest asteroids as "true planets" versus the smaller ones as collisional fragments. From the 1960s onwards, the term "minor planet" was mostly displaced by the term "asteroid", and references to the asteroids as planets in the literature became scarce, except for the geologically evolved largest three: Ceres, and less often Pallas and Vesta.

The beginning of Solar System exploration by space probes in the 1960s spurred a renewed interest in planetary science. A split in definitions regarding satellites occurred around then: planetary scientists began to reconsider the large moons as also being planets, but astronomers who were not planetary scientists generally did not. (This is not exactly the same as the definition used in the previous century, which classed all satellites as secondary planets, even non-round ones like Saturn's Hyperion or Mars's Phobos and Deimos.) All the eight major planets and their planetary-mass moons have since been explored by spacecraft, as have many asteroids and the dwarf planets Ceres and Pluto; however, so far the only planetary-mass body beyond Earth that has been explored by humans is the Moon. (Note: See Timeline of Solar System exploration.)

=== Defining the term planet ===
A growing number of astronomers argued for Pluto to be declassified as a planet, because many similar objects approaching its size had been found in the same region of the Solar System (the Kuiper belt) during the 1990s and early 2000s. Pluto was found to be just one "small" body in a population of thousands. They often referred to the demotion of the asteroids as a precedent, although that had been done based on their geophysical differences from planets rather than their being in a belt. Some of the larger trans-Neptunian objects, such as Quaoar, Sedna, Eris, and Haumea, were heralded in the popular press as the tenth planet.

The announcement of Eris in 2005, an object 27% more massive than Pluto, created the impetus for an official definition of a planet, as considering Pluto a planet would logically have demanded that Eris be considered a planet as well. Since different procedures were in place for naming planets versus non-planets, this created an urgent situation because under the rules Eris could not be named without defining what a planet was. At the time, it was also thought that the size required for a trans-Neptunian object to become round was about the same as that required for the moons of the giant planets (about 400 km diameter), a figure that would have suggested about 200 round objects in the Kuiper belt and thousands more beyond. Many astronomers argued that the public would not accept a definition creating a large number of planets.

The International Astronomical Union's
definition of a planet in the Solar System

1. Object is in orbit around the Sun
2. Object has sufficient mass for its self-gravity to overcome rigid body forces so that it assumes a hydrostatic equilibrium (nearly round) shape
3. Object has cleared the neighbourhood around its orbit

Source: "IAU 2006 General Assembly: Resolutions 5 and 6" (PDF). IAU. 24 August 2006. Archived from the original (PDF) on 25 June 2008.

To acknowledge the problem, the International Astronomical Union (IAU) set about creating a definition of planet and in August 2006 settled on the definition proposed by Uruguayan astronomers Julio Ángel Fernández and Gonzalo Tancredi. Under this definition, the Solar System is considered to have eight planets (Mercury, Venus, Earth, Mars, Jupiter, Saturn, Uranus, and Neptune). Bodies that fulfill the first two conditions but not the third are classified as dwarf planets, provided they are not natural satellites of other planets. Originally an IAU committee had proposed a definition that would have included a larger number of planets as it did not include a cleared neighbourhood as a criterion. After much discussion, it was decided via a vote that those bodies should instead be classified as dwarf planets.

==== Criticisms and alternatives to IAU definition ====
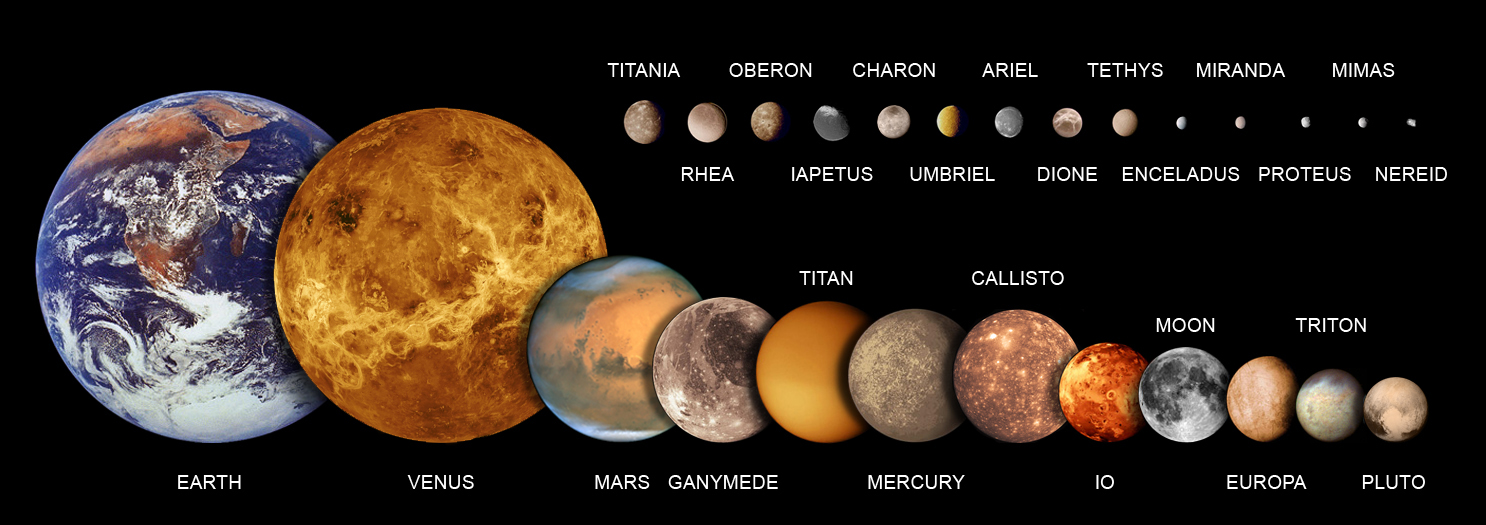
The planetary-mass moons to scale, compared with Mercury, Venus, Earth, Mars, and Pluto. Sub-planetary Proteus and Nereid (about the same size as Mimas) have been included for comparison. Unimaged Dysnomia (intermediate in size between Tethys and Enceladus) is not shown; it is in any case probably not a solid body.

The IAU definition has not been universally used or accepted. In planetary geology, celestial objects are defined as planets by geophysical characteristics. A celestial body may acquire a dynamic (planetary) geology at approximately the mass required for its mantle to become plastic under its own weight. This leads to a state of hydrostatic equilibrium where the body acquires a stable, round shape, which is adopted as the hallmark of planethood by geophysical definitions. For example:

a substellar-mass body that has never undergone nuclear fusion and has enough gravitation to be round due to hydrostatic equilibrium, regardless of its orbital parameters.

In the Solar System, this mass is generally less than the mass required for a body to clear its orbit; thus, some objects that are considered "planets" under geophysical definitions are not considered as such under the IAU definition, such as Ceres and Pluto. (In practice, the requirement for hydrostatic equilibrium is universally relaxed to a requirement for rounding and compaction under self-gravity; Mercury is not actually in hydrostatic equilibrium, but is universally included as a planet regardless.) Proponents of such definitions often argue that location should not matter and that planethood should be defined by the intrinsic properties of an object. Dwarf planets had been proposed as a category of small planet (as opposed to minor planets as sub-planetary objects) and many planetary geologists continue to treat them as planets despite the IAU definition.

The number of dwarf planets even among known objects is not certain. In 2019, Grundy et al. argued based on the low densities of some mid-sized trans-Neptunian objects that the limiting size required for a trans-Neptunian object to reach equilibrium was in fact much larger than it is for the icy moons of the giant planets, being about 900–1000 km diameter. There is general consensus on Ceres in the asteroid belt and on the eight trans-Neptunians that probably cross this threshold—Orcus, Pluto, Haumea, Quaoar, Makemake, Gonggong, Eris, and Sedna.

Planetary geologists may include the nineteen known planetary-mass moons as "satellite planets", including Earth's Moon and Pluto's Charon, like the early modern astronomers. Some go even further and include as planets relatively large, geologically evolved bodies that are nonetheless not very round today, such as Pallas and Vesta; rounded bodies that were completely disrupted by impacts and re-accreted like Hygiea; or even everything at least the diameter of Saturn's moon Mimas, the smallest planetary-mass moon. (This may even include objects that are not round but happen to be larger than Mimas, like Neptune's moon Proteus.)

Astronomer Jean-Luc Margot proposed a mathematical criterion that determines whether an object can clear its orbit during the lifetime of its host star, based on the mass of the planet, its semimajor axis, and the mass of its host star. The formula produces a value called π that is greater than 1 for planets. (Note: Margot's parameter is not to be confused with the famous mathematical constant π≈3.14159265 ... .) The eight known planets and all known exoplanets have π values above 100, while Ceres, Pluto, and Eris have π values of 0.1, or less. Objects with π values of 1 or more are expected to be approximately spherical, so that objects that fulfill the orbital-zone clearance requirement around Sun-like stars will also fulfill the roundness requirement – though this may not be the case around very low-mass stars. In 2024, Margot and collaborators proposed a revised version of the criterion with a uniform clearing timescale of 10 billion years (the approximate main-sequence lifetime of the Sun) or 13.8 billion years (the age of the universe) to accommodate planets orbiting brown dwarfs.

=== Exoplanets ===
Even before the discovery of exoplanets, there were particular disagreements over whether an object should be considered a planet if it was part of a distinct population such as a belt, or if it was large enough to generate energy by the thermonuclear fusion of deuterium. Complicating the matter even further, bodies too small to generate energy by fusing deuterium can form by gas-cloud collapse just like stars and brown dwarfs, even down to the mass of Jupiter: there was thus disagreement about whether how a body formed should be taken into account.

In 1992, astronomers Aleksander Wolszczan and Dale Frail announced the discovery of planets around a pulsar, PSR B1257+12. This discovery is generally considered to be the first definitive detection of a planetary system around another star. Then, on 6 October 1995, Michel Mayor and Didier Queloz of the Geneva Observatory announced the first definitive detection of an exoplanet orbiting an ordinary main-sequence star (51 Pegasi).

The discovery of exoplanets led to another ambiguity in defining a planet: the point at which a planet becomes a star. Many known exoplanets are many times the mass of Jupiter, approaching that of stellar objects known as brown dwarfs. Brown dwarfs are generally considered stars due to their theoretical ability to fuse deuterium, a heavier isotope of hydrogen. Although objects more massive than 75 times that of Jupiter fuse simple hydrogen, objects of 13 Jupiter masses can fuse deuterium. Deuterium is quite rare, constituting less than 0.0026% of the hydrogen in the galaxy, and most brown dwarfs would have ceased fusing deuterium long before their discovery, making them effectively indistinguishable from supermassive planets.

==== IAU working definition of exoplanets ====
The 2006 IAU definition presents some challenges for exoplanets because the language is specific to the Solar System and the criteria of roundness and orbital zone clearance are not presently observable for exoplanets. In 2018, this definition was reassessed and updated as knowledge of exoplanets increased. The current official working definition of an exoplanet is as follows:

1. Objects with true masses below the limiting mass for thermonuclear fusion of deuterium (currently calculated to be 13 Jupiter masses for objects of solar metallicity) that orbit stars, brown dwarfs, or stellar remnants and that have a mass ratio with the central object below the L4/L5 instability (M/M_{central} < 2/(25+√621) are "planets" (no matter how they formed). The minimum mass/size required for an extrasolar object to be considered a planet should be the same as that used in our Solar System.
2. Substellar objects with true masses above the limiting mass for thermonuclear fusion of deuterium are "brown dwarfs", no matter how they formed nor where they are located.
3. Free-floating objects in young star clusters with masses below the limiting mass for thermonuclear fusion of deuterium are not "planets", but are "sub-brown dwarfs" (or whatever name is most appropriate).

The IAU noted that this definition could be expected to evolve as knowledge improves. A 2022 review article discussing the history and rationale of this definition suggested that the words "in young star clusters" should be deleted in clause 3, as such objects have now been found elsewhere, and that the term "sub-brown dwarfs" should be replaced by the more current "free-floating planetary mass objects". The term "planetary mass object" has also been used to refer to ambiguous situations concerning exoplanets, such as objects with mass typical for a planet that are free-floating or orbit a brown dwarf instead of a star. Free-floating objects of planetary mass have sometimes been called planets anyway, specifically rogue planets.

The limit of 13 Jupiter masses is not universally accepted. Objects below this mass limit can sometimes burn deuterium, and the amount of deuterium that is burned depends on an object's composition. Furthermore, deuterium is quite scarce, so the stage of deuterium burning does not actually last very long; unlike hydrogen burning in a star, deuterium burning does not significantly affect the future evolution of an object. The relationship between mass and radius (or density) show no special feature at this limit, according to which brown dwarfs have the same physics and internal structure as lighter Jovian planets, and would more naturally be considered planets.

Thus, many catalogues of exoplanets include objects heavier than 13 Jupiter masses, sometimes going up to 60 Jupiter masses. (The limit for hydrogen burning and becoming a red dwarf star is about 80 Jupiter masses.) The situation of main-sequence stars has been used to argue for such an inclusive definition of "planet" as well, as they also differ greatly along the two orders of magnitude that they cover, in their structure, atmospheres, temperature, spectral features, and probably formation mechanisms; yet they are all considered as one class, being all hydrostatic-equilibrium objects undergoing nuclear burning.

== Mythology and naming ==
=== Classical planets ===
The names for the planets of the Solar System (other than Earth) in the English language are derived from naming practices developed consecutively by the Babylonians, Greeks, and Romans of antiquity. The practice of grafting the names of gods onto the planets was almost certainly borrowed from the Babylonians by the ancient Greeks, and thereafter from the Greeks by the Romans. The Babylonians named Venus after the Sumerian goddess of love with the Akkadian name Ishtar; Mars after their god of war, Nergal; Mercury after their god of wisdom Nabu; Jupiter after their chief god, Marduk; and Saturn after their god of farming, Ninurta. There are too many concordances between Greek and Babylonian naming conventions for them to have arisen separately. Given the differences in mythology, the correspondence was not perfect. For instance, the Babylonian Nergal was a god of war, and thus the Greeks identified him with Ares. Unlike Ares, Nergal was also a god of pestilence and ruler of the underworld.

In ancient Greece, the two great luminaries, the Sun and the Moon, were called Helios and Selene, two ancient Titanic deities; the slowest planet, Saturn, was called Phainon, the shiner; followed by Phaethon, Jupiter, "bright"; the red planet, Mars was known as Pyroeis, the "fiery"; the brightest, Venus, was known as Phosphoros, the light bringer; and the fleeting final planet, Mercury, was called Stilbon, the gleamer. The Greeks assigned each planet to one among their pantheon of gods, the Olympians and the earlier Titans:

- Helios and Selene were the names of both planets and gods, both of them Titans (later supplanted by Olympians Apollo and Artemis);
- Phainon was sacred to Cronus, the Titan who fathered the Olympians, associated with the harvest;
- Phaethon was sacred to Zeus, Cronus's son who deposed him as king;
- Pyroeis was given to Ares, son of Zeus and god of war;
- Phosphoros was ruled by Aphrodite, the goddess of love; and
- Stilbon with its speedy motion, was ruled over by Hermes, messenger of the gods and god of learning and wit.

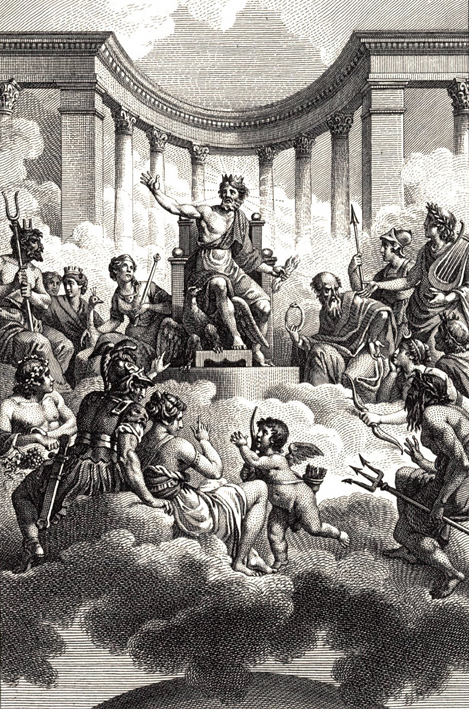
The Greek gods of Olympus, after whom the Solar System's Roman names of the planets are derived

Although modern Greeks still use their ancient names for the planets, other European languages, because of the influence of the Roman Empire and, later, the Catholic Church, use the Roman (Latin) names rather than the Greek ones. The Romans inherited Proto-Indo-European mythology as the Greeks did and shared with them a common pantheon under different names, but the Romans lacked the rich narrative traditions that Greek poetic culture had given their gods. During the later period of the Roman Republic, Roman writers borrowed much of the Greek narratives and applied them to their own pantheon, to the point where they became virtually indistinguishable. When the Romans studied Greek astronomy, they gave the planets their own gods' names: Mercurius (for Hermes), Venus (Aphrodite), Mars (Ares), Iuppiter (Zeus), and Saturnus (Cronus). However, there was not much agreement on which god a particular planet was associated with; according to Pliny the Elder, while Phainon and Phaethon's associations with Saturn and Jupiter respectively were widely agreed upon, Pyroeis was also associated with the demi-god Hercules, Stilbon was also associated with Apollo, god of music, healing, and prophecy; Phosphoros was also associated with prominent goddesses Juno and Isis. Some Romans, following a belief possibly originating in Mesopotamia but developed in Hellenistic Egypt, believed that the seven gods after whom the planets were named took hourly shifts in looking after affairs on Earth. The order of shifts went Saturn, Jupiter, Mars, Sun, Venus, Mercury, Moon (from the farthest to the closest planet). Therefore, the first day was started by Saturn (1st hour), second day by Sun (25th hour), followed by Moon (49th hour), Mars, Mercury, Jupiter, and Venus. Because each day was named by the god that started it, this became the order of the days of the week in the Roman calendar. In English, Saturday, Sunday, and Monday are straightforward translations of these Roman names. The other days were renamed after Tīw (Tuesday), Wōden (Wednesday), Þunor (Thursday), and Frīġ (Friday), the Anglo-Saxon gods considered similar or equivalent to Mars, Mercury, Jupiter, and Venus, respectively.

Earth's name in English is not derived from Greco-Roman mythology. Because it was only generally accepted as a planet in the 17th century, there is no tradition of naming it after a god. (The same is true, in English at least, of the Sun and the Moon, though they are no longer generally considered planets.) The name originates from the Old English word eorþe, which was the word for "ground" and "dirt" as well as the world itself. As with its equivalents in the other Germanic languages, it derives ultimately from the Proto-Germanic word erþō, as can be seen in the English earth, the German Erde, the Dutch aarde, and the Scandinavian jord. Many of the Romance languages retain the old Roman word terra (or some variation of it) that was used with the meaning of "dry land" as opposed to "sea". The non-Romance languages use their own native words. The Greeks retain their original name, Γή (Ge).

Non-European cultures use other planetary-naming systems. India uses a system based on the Navagraha, which incorporates the seven traditional planets and the ascending and descending lunar nodes Rahu and Ketu. The planets are Surya 'Sun', Chandra 'Moon', Budha for Mercury, Shukra ('bright') for Venus, Mangala (the god of war) for Mars, Bṛhaspati (councilor of the gods) for Jupiter, and Shani (symbolic of time) for Saturn.

The native Persian names of most of the planets are based on identifications of the Mesopotamian gods with Iranian gods, analogous to the Greek and Latin names. Mercury is Tir (تیر) for the western Iranian god Tīriya (patron of scribes), analogous to Nabu; Venus is Nāhid (ناهید) for Anahita; Mars is Bahrām (بهرام) for Verethragna; and Jupiter is Hormoz (هرمز) for Ahura Mazda. The Persian name for Saturn, Keyvān (کیوان), is a borrowing from Akkadian kajamānu, meaning "the permanent, steady".

China and the countries of eastern Asia historically subject to Chinese cultural influence (such as Japan, Korea, and Vietnam) use a naming system based on the five Chinese elements: water (Mercury 水星 "water star"), metal or gold (Venus 金星 "gold star"), fire (Mars 火星 "fire star"), wood (Jupiter 木星 "wood star"), and earth or soil (Saturn 土星 "soil star").

In traditional Hebrew astronomy, the seven traditional planets have (for the most part) descriptive names—the Sun is (הַשֶּׁמֶשׁ) ha-Shemesh and (חַמָּה) Ḥammah or "the hot one", the Moon is (הַיָּרֵחַ) ha-Yareach and (לְבָנָה) Levanah or "the white one", Venus is (נוֹגַהּ) Nogah or "the bright one", Mercury is (כּוֹכַב חַמָּה) Kokhav Ḥammah or "Planet of the hot one" (given its close proximity to the Sun), Mars is (מַאְדִּים) Ma'adim or "the red one", and Saturn is (שַׁבְּתַאי) Shabbatai or "the resting one" (in reference to its slow movement compared to the other visible planets). The odd one out is Jupiter, called (צֶדֶק) Tzedeq or "justice". These names, first attested in the Babylonian Talmud, are not the original Hebrew names of the planets. In 377 Epiphanius of Salamis recorded another set of names that seem to have pagan or Canaanite associations: those names, since replaced for religious reasons, were probably the historical Semitic names, and may have much earlier roots going back to Babylonian astronomy.

The etymologies for the Arabic names of the planets are less well understood. Mostly agreed among scholars are the Sun (الشَّمْس) ash-Shams, from the same root as Shemesh; the Moon (القَمَر) al-Qamar meaning "the strongly white"; Venus (الزُّهَرَة) az-Zuhara is called "the beautiful bright one" for its high albedo; Earth (الأَرْض) al-ʾArḍ, from the same root as Eretz; and Saturn (زُحَل) Zuḥal means "withdrawer" for its steady movement across the sky. Multiple suggested etymologies exist for Mercury (عُطَارِد) ʿUṭārid which may mean "continuously moving" or "following swiftly", Mars (المِرِّيخ) al-Mirrīkh would be "flecked with red spots" or "to rub together (flammable branches)" stemming from its reddish hue, and Jupiter (المُشْتَرِي) al-Muštarī literally "the buyer" and metaphorically the "purchaser of beauty and elegance" or "the relentless, persistent traveler", analogous to something that advances firmly without faltering or breaking in its path, but there is no agreement among scholars.

=== Modern discoveries ===
When subsequent planets were discovered in the 18th and 19th centuries, Uranus was named for a Greek deity and Neptune for a Roman one (the counterpart of Poseidon). The asteroids were initially named from mythology as well—Ceres, Juno, and Vesta are major Roman goddesses, and Pallas is an epithet of the major Greek goddess Athena—but as more and more were discovered, they first started being named after more minor goddesses, and the mythological restriction was dropped starting from the twentieth asteroid Massalia in 1852. Pluto was named after the Greek god of the underworld, who could make himself invisible, since the search for Planet X had taken so long (and secondarily because the first two letters are Percival Lowell's initials).

The names of Uranus (天王星 "sky king star"), Neptune (海王星 "sea king star"), and Pluto (冥王星 "underworld king star") in Chinese, Korean, and Japanese are calques based on the roles of those gods in Roman and Greek mythology. (Note: In Korean, these names are more often written in Hangul rather than Chinese characters, e.g. 명왕성 for Pluto. In Vietnamese, calques are more common than directly reading these names as Sino-Vietnamese, e.g. sao Thuỷ rather than Thuỷ tinh for Mercury. Pluto is not sao Minh Vương but sao Diêm Vương "Yama star".) In the 19th century, Alexander Wylie and Li Shanlan calqued the names of the first 117 asteroids into Chinese, and many of their names are still used today, e.g. Ceres (穀神星 "grain goddess star"), Pallas (智神星 "wisdom goddess star"), Juno (婚神星 "marriage goddess star"), Vesta (灶神星 "hearth goddess star"), and Hygiea (健神星 "health goddess star"). Such translations were extended to some later minor planets, including some of the dwarf planets discovered in the 21st century, e.g. Haumea (妊神星 "pregnancy goddess star"), Makemake (鳥神星 "bird goddess star"), and Eris (鬩神星 "quarrel goddess star"). However, except for the better-known asteroids and dwarf planets, many of them are rare outside Chinese astronomical dictionaries.

Hebrew names were chosen for Uranus (אורון Oron, "small light") and Neptune (רהב Rahab, a Biblical sea monster) in 2009; prior to that the names "Uranus" and "Neptune" had simply been borrowed.

After more objects were discovered beyond Neptune, naming conventions depending on their orbits were put in place: those in the 2:3 resonance with Neptune (the plutinos) are given names from underworld myths, while others are given names from creation myths. Most of the trans-Neptunian objects are named after gods and goddesses from other cultures (e.g. Quaoar is named after a Tongva god). There are a few exceptions which continue the Roman and Greek scheme, notably including Eris as it had initially been considered a tenth planet.

The moons (including the planetary-mass ones) are generally given names with some association with their parent planet. The planetary-mass moons of Jupiter are named after four of Zeus's lovers (or other sexual partners); those of Saturn are named after Cronus's brothers and sisters, the Titans; those of Uranus are named after characters from Shakespeare and Pope (originally specifically from fairy mythology, but that ended with the naming of Miranda). Neptune's planetary-mass moon Triton is named after the god's son; Pluto's planetary-mass moon Charon is named after the ferryman of the dead, who carries the souls of the newly deceased to the underworld (Pluto's domain).

=== Exoplanets ===
Exoplanets are commonly named after their parent star and their order of discovery within its planetary system, such as Proxima Centauri b. (The lettering starts at b, with a considered to represent the parent star.)

=== Symbols ===
Most common planetary symbols
| Sun | Mercury | Venus | Earth | Moon | Mars | Jupiter | Saturn | Uranus or | Neptune |

The written symbols for Mercury, Venus, Jupiter, Saturn, and possibly Mars have been traced to forms found in late Greek papyrus texts. The symbols for Jupiter and Saturn are identified as monograms of the corresponding Greek names, and the symbol for Mercury is a stylized caduceus.

According to Annie Scott Dill Maunder, antecedents of the planetary symbols were used in art to represent the gods associated with the classical planets. Bianchini's planisphere, discovered by Francesco Bianchini in the 18th century but produced in the 2nd century, shows Greek personifications of planetary gods charged with early versions of the planetary symbols. Mercury has a caduceus; Venus has, attached to her necklace, a cord connected to another necklace; Mars, a spear; Jupiter, a staff; Saturn, a scythe; the Sun, a circlet with rays radiating from it; and the Moon, a headdress with a crescent attached. The modern shapes with the cross-marks first appeared around the 16th century. According to Maunder, the addition of crosses appears to be "an attempt to give a savour of Christianity to the symbols of the old pagan gods." Earth itself was not considered a classical planet; its symbol descends from a pre-heliocentric symbol for the four corners of the world.

When further planets were discovered orbiting the Sun, symbols were invented for them. The most common astronomical symbol for Uranus, ⛢, was invented by Johann Gottfried Köhler, and was intended to represent the newly discovered metal platinum. An alternative symbol, ♅, was invented by Jérôme Lalande, and represents a globe with a H on top, for Uranus's discoverer Herschel. Today, ⛢ is mostly used by astronomers and ♅ by astrologers, though it is possible to find each symbol in the other context. The first few asteroids were considered to be planets when they were discovered, and were likewise given abstract symbols, e.g. Ceres's sickle (⚳), Pallas's spear (⚴), Juno's sceptre (⚵), and Vesta's hearth (⚶). However, as their number rose further and further, this practice stopped in favour of numbering them instead. (Massalia, the first asteroid not named from mythology, is also the first asteroid that was not assigned a symbol by its discoverer.) The symbols for the first four asteroids, Ceres through Vesta, remained in use for longer than the others, and even in the modern day NASA has used the Ceres symbol—Ceres being the only asteroid that is also a dwarf planet. Neptune's symbol (♆) represents the god's trident. The astronomical symbol for Pluto is a P-L monogram (♇), though it has become less common since the IAU definition reclassified Pluto. Since Pluto's reclassification, NASA has used the traditional astrological symbol of Pluto (⯓), a planetary orb over Pluto's bident.

Some rarer planetary symbols in Unicode
| Earth | Vesta | Juno | Ceres | Pallas | Hygiea | Orcus | Pluto or | Charon | Haumea | Quaoar | Makemake | Gonggong | Eris | Sedna |

The IAU discourages the use of planetary symbols in modern journal articles in favour of one-letter or (to disambiguate Mercury and Mars) two-letter abbreviations for the major planets. The symbols for the Sun and Earth are nonetheless common, as solar mass, Earth mass, and similar units are common in astronomy. Other planetary symbols today are mostly encountered in astrology. Astrologers have resurrected the old astronomical symbols for the first few asteroids and continue to invent symbols for other objects. This includes relatively standard astrological symbols for the dwarf planets discovered in the 21st century, which were not given symbols by astronomers because planetary symbols had mostly fallen out of use in astronomy by the time they were discovered. Many astrological symbols are included in Unicode, and a few of these new inventions (the symbols of Haumea, Makemake, and Eris) have since been used by NASA in astronomy. The Eris symbol is a traditional one from Discordianism, a religion worshipping the goddess Eris. The other dwarf-planet symbols are mostly initialisms (except Haumea) in the native scripts of the cultures they come from; they also represent something associated with the corresponding deity or culture, e.g. Makemake's face or Gonggong's snake-tail. Moskowitz also devised symbols for the planetary-mass moons; most of them are initialisms combined with a feature of their parent planet's symbol. The exception is Charon, which combines the high orb of Pluto's bident symbol with a crescent, suggesting both Charon as a moon and the mythological Charon's boat crossing the river Styx.

== See also ==
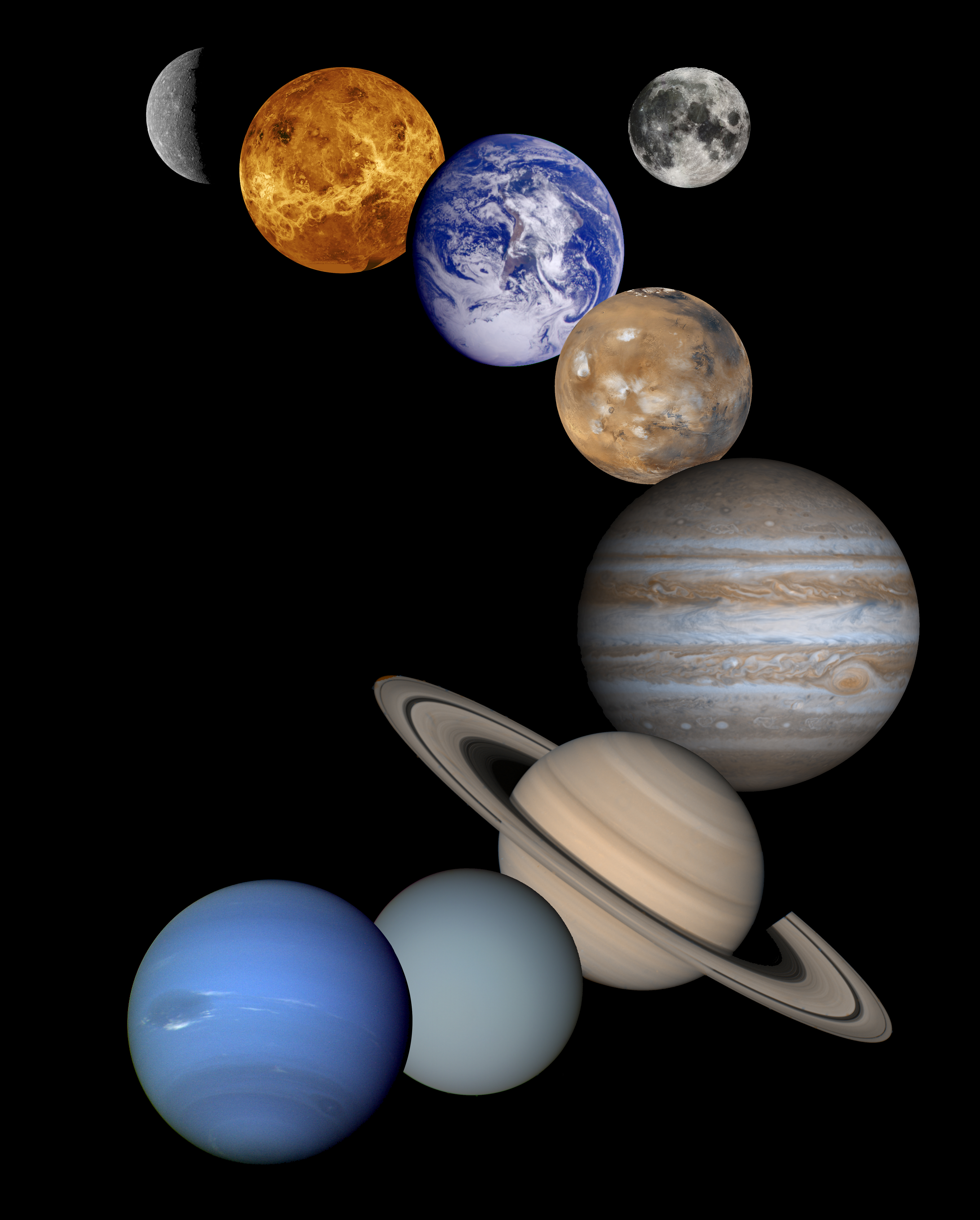
Clicking on a planet leads to the article about its depiction in fiction.

- Double planet – Binary system where two planetary-mass objects share an orbital axis external to both
- List of landings on extraterrestrial bodies
- Lists of planets – A list of lists of planets sorted by diverse attributes
- Mesoplanet – Proposed term for planetary objects that have masses between those of Mercury and Ceres
- Planetary habitability – Known extent to which a planet is suitable for life
- Planetary mnemonic – Phrase used to remember the planets of the Solar System
- Theoretical planetology – Scientific modeling of planets
