= Pyroeis =

Sky god of Areios, the planet Mars

Pyroeis (Ancient Greek: Πυρόεις) in ancient Greek religion is the god of the wandering star Areios, identified with the planet Mars.

He is also known as Mesonyx (Ancient Greek: Μεσονυξ; 'midnight').

== Etymology ==
Pyroeis, from Ancient Greek: Πυρό, romanized: pyro, 'fire', means 'the fiery one'.

== Function ==
In Ancient Greek astronomy, Pyroeis is the god of the planet Mars, one of the five planets visible to the naked eye. Astronomers of the time assigned these "planetae" various names, associated them with different gods, and ascribed various qualities to their apparent behaviour in the sky.

== See also ==
- List of Greek deities
