= Phaenon =

Synonym of Saturn

Phaenon or Phainon (Greek: Φαίνων) in Greek mythology is the sky god of the star of Cronus (as in the planet Saturn). The name Phaenon is sometimes used poetically to refer to the planet Saturn; 'Phaenon' means 'bright' or 'shining', and Saturn is a bright planet which is easy to see.

When Prometheus created the race of men, Phaenon was the youth he made excelling all others in beauty. When he intended to keep him back, without presenting him to Zeus as he did the others, Eros reported this to Zeus, whereupon Hermes was sent to Phaenon and persuaded him to come to Zeus and become immortal. Therefore he is placed among the "wandering stars". However, unlike other ancient authors, who mention that Phaenon was the name of the 'star of Cronus' (the planet Saturn), Hyginus, who tells this story based on Heraclides Ponticus, reports that Phaenon was transformed into the 'star of Jove' (the planet Jupiter), which others commonly say was named Phaethon, which Hyginus, citing Eratosthenes, says is an alternative name of the Sun, who was his father.

== See also ==
- List of Greek deities
