= List of translators into English =

This is a list of people who have translated one or more works into English from another language. Entries are divided by broad chronological period, and within that by language of the original text. Translators may appear in multiple sections within the list.

== Translators of ancient literature (Bronze Age–5th century CE) ==
=== Translators of ancient Mesopotamian literature ===
- George Aaron Barton – Debate between sheep and grain, Barton Cylinder, Enlil and Ninlil, Self-praise of Shulgi (Shulgi D), Old Babylonian oracle, Kesh temple hymn, Debate between Winter and Summer, Hymn to Enlil, Lament for Ur (all 1918)
- Robert D. Biggs – Kesh temple hymn (1974)
- Edward Chiera – Kesh temple hymn, Debate between sheep and grain (both 1924)
- Stephanie Dalley – Atra-Hasis, The Myth of Anzu, Descent of Ishtar into the Underworld, Enūma Eliš, Erra and Ishum (all 1998)
- Claude Hermann Walter Johns – Code of Hammurabi (1903)
- Samuel Noah Kramer – Death of Gilgamesh (1944), Debate between Winter and Summer (1944), Gilgamesh and Aga (1949), Code of Ur-Nammu (1952), Debate between sheep and grain (1959)
- Wilfred G. Lambert – Atra-Hasis (1969, with Alan Millard), Enūma Eliš (2011)
- Stephen Herbert Langdon – Kesh temple hymn (1915)
- Alan Millard – Atra-Hasis (1969, with Wilfred G. Lambert)

==== Translators of the Epic of Gilgamesh ====
- Stephanie Dalley (1998)
- John Gardner (a.1982, with John Maier; published 1984)
- Andrew R. George (2000)
- Stephen Mitchell (2004)
- Nancy Sandars (1960)

=== Translators of ancient Egyptian literature ===
- James Peter Allen – Book of Nut (1988)
- Samuel Birch – Book of the Dead (1867)
- E. A. Wallis Budge – Book of the Dead (1895), Amduat (1905), Book of Gates (1905)
- Adriaan de Buck – Coffin Texts (1935–1961)
- Marshall Clagett – Coffin Texts (1989, selections), Pyramid Texts (1989, selections), Book of Nut (1995)
- Raymond O. Faulkner – Festival Songs of Isis and Nephthys (1936), Pyramid Texts (1969), Book of the Dead (1972), Coffin Texts (1973–1978)
- Leonard H. Lesko – Coffin Texts (1972)
- Miriam Lichtheim – Coffin Texts (1973, selections), Pyramid Texts (1973, selections), Book of the Dead (1973, selections)
- John Albert Wilson – Coffin Texts (1955, selections), Pyramid Texts (1955, selections), Book of the Dead (1955, selections)

=== Translators of ancient Chinese literature ===
- Cyril Birch and Donald Keene – Classic of Poetry, Zuo Zhuan, Guoyu, Zhan Guo Ce, The Faults of Qin, Chu Ci, Zhuangzi, Shiji (selections), selections of Han poetry (all 1965)
- Chung Ling – Bao Linghui, Cai Yan, Wei Shuo, Zhuo Wenjun
- Thomas Cleary – Mawangdui Silk Texts, Six Secret Teachings, Sun Bin's Art of War, Fan Yunqiao
- David Hinton – Tao Yuanming, Xie Lingyun
- James Legge – Bamboo Annals, Book of Documents, Book of Rites, Classic of Poetry, Doctrine of the Mean, Great Learning, Spring and Autumn Annals, Zuo Zhuan
- Lin Yutang – including Ban Gu, Sima Qian, Tao Yuanming, Wang Xizhi, Zhuangzi
- A. Charles Muller – Brahmajāla Sūtra (with Kenneth K. Tanaka), Doctrine of the Mean, Great Learning
- Ezra Pound – Great Learning
- Red Pine – Laṅkāvatāra Sūtra (from Chinese version of Guṇabhadra), Li Sao
- Kenneth Rexroth – Han dynasty and Six Dynasties poets including Bao Linghui, Cai Yan, Wei Shuo, Zhuo Wenjun
- Arthur Waley – Classic of Poetry, Qu Yuan
- Burton Watson – Han Feizi, Kumārajīva, Mozi, Shiji, Xunzi, Zhuangzi, Zuo Zhuan

==== Translators of the Analects ====
- David Hinton
- James Legge
- A. Charles Muller
- Ezra Pound
- Arthur Waley
- Burton Watson

==== Translators of The Art of War ====
- Thomas Cleary

==== Translators of Faxian ====
- Samuel Beal (1869, the first English translation of Faxian directly from Chinese)
- Herbert Giles (1877)
- John Watson Laidlay (1848, via the 1836 French translation by Jean-Pierre Abel-Rémusat)
- James Legge (1886)

==== Translators of the I Ching ====
- Cary Baynes (via the German of Richard Wilhelm)
- David Hinton
- James Legge

==== Translators of Mencius ====
- David Hinton
- James Legge
- A. Charles Muller

==== Translators of the Tao Te Ching ====
- Thomas Cleary
- Herbert Giles
- David Hinton
- James Legge
- Ursula K. Le Guin
- Stephen Mitchell
- A. Charles Muller
- Red Pine
- Arthur Waley

==== Translators of the Zhuangzi ====
- Thomas Cleary
- Herbert Giles
- David Hinton
- James Legge
- A. Charles Muller

=== Translators of ancient Indian literature ===
- Thomas Cleary – Buddhāvataṃsaka Sūtra (1993), Arthashastra (1998), Laṅkāvatāra Sūtra (2012)
- Barbara Stoler Miller – Śatakatraya (1967), Mālavikāgnimitram (1984), Shakuntala (1984), Vikramōrvaśīyam (1984), Yoga Sutras of Patanjali (1996)
- Monier Monier-Williams – Vikramōrvaśīyam (1849), Shakuntala (1853), Nala and Damayanti (1860)
- A. Charles Muller – Sutra of Perfect Enlightenment (from Chinese version)
- Red Pine – Heart Sutra
- W. H. D. Rouse – Jataka tales
- Arthur W. Ryder – Mṛcchakatika (1905), Śatakatraya (1910), Raghuvaṃśa (1912, selections), Shakuntala (1912), Mālavikāgnimitram (1915), Panchatantra (1925)
- Andrew Schelling – Gaha Sattasai (2001, selections)

==== Translators of the Bhagavad Gita ====
- Annie Besant (1895)
- Charles Martin (2013)
- Juan Mascaro (1962)
- Barbara Stoler Miller (1986)
- Stephen Mitchell (2002)
- Sarvepalli Radhakrishnan (1948)
- Arthur W. Ryder (1929)

==== Translators of the Dhammapada ====
- Juan Mascaro (1973)
- Sarvepalli Radhakrishnan (1950)

==== Translators of the Diamond Sutra ====
- A. Charles Muller (from Chinese version)
- Red Pine

==== Translators of the Mahabharata ====
- Arthur W. Ryder (1912, selections)

==== Translators of the Ramayana ====
- Arthur W. Ryder (1912, selections)

==== Translators of the Rigveda ====
- Max Mueller (1890–1892)

==== Translators of Sangam literature ====
- A. Dakshinamurthy
- Kausalya Hart
- George L. Hart
- Hank Heifetz
- P. S. Subrahmanya Sastri – translated the Tolkappiyam

==== Translators of the Upanishads ====
- Juan Mascaro (1965)
- Max Mueller (1879–1884)
- Sarvepalli Radhakrishnan (1953, selections)

=== Translators of ancient Greek ===
- Apostolos Athanassakis – Apocolocyntosis (1973), Shield of Heracles (1983)
- William Barker – Basil of Caesarea
- Jonathan Barnes – pre-Socratic philosophers
- Willis Barnstone – Heraclitus
- John Bury – Isocrates
- Mildred Cooke – Basil of Caesarea, John Chrysostom
- E. R. Dodds – Iamblichus, Proclus, Salutius
- Thomas Drant – Gregory of Nazianzus
- Charles Abraham Elton – Shield of Heracles (1815)
- Hugh Evelyn-White – Shield of Heracles (1914)
- Thomas Francklin – Epistles of Phalaris (1749)
- Robert Graves – Apocolocyntosis (1935)
- George Grube – Demetrius of Phalerum
- Daryl Hine – Batrachomyomachia (2008)
- Richmond Lattimore – lyrics by Alcaeus, Alcman, Anacreon, Archilochus, Callinus, Corinna, Hipponax, Hybrias, Ibycus, Mimnermus, Phocylides, Praxilla, Semonides of Amorgos, Simonides of Ceos, Solon, Stesichorus, Terpander, Theognis of Megara, Tyrtaeus, Xenophanes (all 1949), Shield of Heracles (1959)
- Burton Raffel – poetry by Alcaeus, Alcman, Antipater of Sidon, Antipater of Thessalonica, Anyte, Aratus, Asclepiades of Samos, Hegemon of Thasos, Leonidas of Alexandria, Leonidas of Tarentum, Meleager, Menecrates of Ephesus, Phalaecus, Philodemus, Phocylides, Simonides of Ceos, Terpander, Theodoridas of Syracuse
- W. H. D. Rouse – Apocolocyntosis, Nonnus
- Henry Billingsley - Euclid's Elements

==== Translators of Aeschylus ====
- Anne Carson – Oresteia (2009)
- Wendy Doniger – Oresteia (1988, with David Grene)
- Edward FitzGerald – Agamemnon
- David Grene – Prometheus Bound (1942), Oresteia (1988, with Wendy Doniger)
- Richmond Lattimore – Agamemnon (1947), The Libation Bearers, The Eumenides (both 1953)
- Gilbert Murray – Agamemnon (1920), The Libation Bearers (1923), The Eumenides (1926), The Suppliants (1930), Prometheus Bound (1931), Seven Against Thebes (1935), The Persians (1939)
- Robert Potter – complete plays (1777)
- James Scully – Prometheus Bound (1975)
- David R. Slavitt – Oresteia (1999)
- Alan Sommerstein – The Eumenides (1989), complete plays and major fragments (2008)
- Phillip Vellacott – Oresteia (1956), Prometheus Bound, The Suppliants, Seven Against Thebes, The Persians (all 1961)
- Rex Warner – Prometheus Bound (1947)

==== Translators of the Greek Anthology ====
- Kenneth Rexroth (1962, selections)
- David R. Slavitt (2010, selections)

==== Translators of Apollonius of Perga ====
- Ivor Bulmer-Thomas – Conics (1941, parts of Book I)
- R. Catesby Taliaferro – Conics (1941, Books I–III)
- Thomas Heath – Conics (1896)

==== Translators of Archimedes ====
- Thomas Heath – On the Sphere and Cylinder, Measurement of a Circle, On Conoids and Spheroids, On Spirals, On the Equilibrium of Planes, The Sand Reckoner, Quadrature of the Parabola, On Floating Bodies, Book of Lemmas, The Cattle Problem (all 1897)

==== Translators of Aristarchus of Samos ====
- Thomas Heath – On the Sizes and Distances of the Sun and Moon (1913)

==== Translators of Aristophanes ====
- William Arrowsmith – The Birds (1961), The Clouds (1962)
- Charles J. Billson – The Acharnians (1882)
- Lionel Casson – The Acharnians (1960)
- John Hookham Frere – The Acharnians, The Birds, The Knights, The Frogs (all 1839)
- Richmond Lattimore – The Frogs (1962)
- Gilbert Murray – The Frogs (1902), The Birds (1950), The Knights (1956)
- Douglass Parker – The Acharnians (1961), The Wasps (1962), Lysistrata (1964), Assemblywomen (1967), Peace, Plutus (both 2014)
- Benjamin Bickley Rogers – complete plays (1852–1919)
- Alan Sommerstein – The Acharnians, The Clouds, Lysistrata (all 1974), The Knights, Peace, The Birds, Assemblywomen, Plutus (all 1978, with David Barrett), The Wasps (1983), Thesmophoriazusae (1994), The Frogs (1997)
- Robert Yelverton Tyrrell – The Acharnians (1883)
- Arthur Way – The Acharnians (1927)

==== Translators of Aristotle ====
- Jonathan Barnes – Posterior Analytics
- F. M. Cornford – Physics
- George Grube – Poetics
- W. K. C. Guthrie – On the Heavens
- Benjamin Jowett – Politics
- C. D. C. Reeve – Eudemian Ethics, Generation of Animals, History of Animals, Metaphysics, Meteorology, Nicomachean Ethics, On Generation and Corruption, On the Heavens, On the Soul, Parts of Animals, Physics, Politics, Rhetoric, Sophistical Refutations, Topics
- Philip Wicksteed – Physics (translation finished by F. M. Cornford)

==== Translators of Bacchylides ====
- Richard Claverhouse Jebb – poems and fragments (1905)
- Richmond Lattimore – odes and dithyrambs (1949)
- David R. Slavitt – odes and dithyrambs (1998)

==== Translators of Callimachus ====
- Stanley Lombardo – Hymns, Epigrams, and fragments (1987, with Diane J. Rayor)
- Burton Raffel

==== Translators of Cassius Dio ====
- Ian Scott-Kilvert – Roman History (1987)

==== Translators of Diophantus ====
- Thomas Heath – Arithmetica (1885)

==== Translators of Euclid ====
- Henry Billingsley – Elements (1570)
- Thomas Heath – Elements (1908)
- R. Catesby Taliaferro – Elements (1952)

==== Translators of Euripides ====
- William Arrowsmith – The Bacchae (1959), Alcestis, Cyclops, Herakles, Orestes, Hecuba
- Robert Bagg – Hippolytus (1973), The Bacchae (1978)
- Anne Carson – Electra (2001), Herakles, Hecuba, Hippolytus, Alcestis (all 2006), Iphigenia in Tauris (2013), The Bacchae (2015)
- David Grene – Hippolytus (1942)
- Robinson Jeffers – Medea (1946, free adaptation)
- Richmond Lattimore – The Trojan Women (1947), Alcestis (1955)
- W. S. Merwin – Iphigenia in Aulis (1978, with George E. Dimock Jr)
- Gilbert Murray – Hippolytus (1902), The Bacchae (1902), The Trojan Women (1905), Electra (1905), Medea (1910), Iphigenia in Tauris (1911), Rhesus (1913), Alcestis (1915), Ion (1954)
- Robert Potter – complete plays (1783)
- Don Taylor – Iphigenia in Aulis (1990)
- Phillip Vellacott – Hippolytus, Iphigenia in Tauris, Alcestis (all 1953), Ion, The Trojan Women, Helen, The Bacchae (all 1954), Medea, Hecuba, Electra, Herakles (all 1963), Children of Heracles, Andromache, The Suppliants, The Phoenician Women, Orestes, Iphigenia in Aulis (all 1972)
- Emily Vermeule – Electra (1959)
- Rex Warner – Medea (1944), Helen (1958), Hippolytus (1958)

==== Translators of Eusebius ====
- Mary Basset – Ecclesiastical History

==== Translators of Herodotus ====
The Histories is Herodotus' only work.

- Henry Francis Cary (1849)
- A. D. Godley (1920–1925)
- David Grene (1985)
- Tom Holland (2013)
- G. C. Macaulay (1904)
- Enoch Powell (1949)
- George Rawlinson (1858)
- Aubrey de Sélincourt (1954)
- Robin Waterfield (1998)

==== Translators of Hesiod ====
- Apostolos Athanassakis – Works and Days, Theogony (both 1983)
- George Chapman – Works and Days (1618)
- Thomas Cooke – Works and Days, Theogony (both 1728)
- Charles Abraham Elton – Works and Days, Theogony (both 1815)
- Hugh Evelyn-White – Works and Days, Theogony (both 1914)
- Daryl Hine – Works and Days, Theogony (both 2008)
- Kimberly Johnson – Works and Days, Theogony (both 2017)
- Richmond Lattimore – Works and Days, Theogony (both 1959)
- Martin Litchfield West – Works and Days, Theogony (both 1988)
- Stanley Lombardo – Works and Days, Theogony (both 1993)
- Glenn Warren Most – Works and Days, Theogony (both 2006)
- A. E. Stallings – Works and Days (2018)

==== Translators of the Homeric Hymns ====
- Apostolos Athanassakis (1976)
- George Chapman (1624)
- William Congreve – Hymn to Aphrodite (1710)
- Hugh Evelyn-White (1914)
- Helene P. Foley – Hymn to Demeter (2013)
- Daryl Hine (2008)
- Percy Bysshe Shelley – Hymn to Mercury (1820)

==== Translators of Lucian ====
- Lionel Casson – satirical dialogues (1962, selections)
- Thomas Francklin – complete works (1780–1781)

==== Translators of Menander ====
- Gilbert Murray – Perikeiromene (1942), Epitrepontes (1945)
- Douglass Parker – Samia (2014)
- Burton Raffel
- Alan Sommerstein – Samia (2013)
- Phillip Vellacott – plays and fragments (1967)

==== Translators of Nicomachus ====
- R. Catesby Taliaferro – Introduction to Arithmetic (1952)

==== Translators of On the Sublime ====
The author of On the Sublime is unknown, but conventionally referred to as Longinus or Pseudo-Longinus.

- George Grube

==== Translators of the Orphic Hymns ====
- Apostolos Athanassakis (1988)

==== Translators of Pindar ====
- Richmond Lattimore – Odes (1947)
- W. H. D. Rouse

==== Translators of Plato ====
- Jonathan Barnes – Demodocus
- Myles Burnyeat – Theaetetus (revising translation by M. J. Levett)
- John M. Cooper – Epigrams
- F. M. Cornford – Parmenides, Republic, Timaeus
- John Maxwell Edmonds – Epigrams
- Mary Louise Gill – Parmenides
- Francisco J. Gonzalez – Clitophon
- George Grube – Apology, Crito, Euthyphro, Meno, Phaedo, Republic
- W. K. C. Guthrie – Meno, Protagoras
- Benjamin Jowett – complete dialogues
- Anthony Kenny – Second Alcibiades
- Stanley Lombardo – Lysis, Protagoras
- Richard McKirahan – Epinomis
- Alexander Nehamas – Phaedrus, Symposium
- C. D. C. Reeve – Apology, Cratylus, Crito, Euthyphro, Laws, Meno, Republic
- W. H. D. Rouse – Apology, Crito, Ion, Meno, Phaedo, Republic, Symposium
- Christopher Rowe – Statesman
- Malcolm Schofield – Minos
- Nicholas D. Smith – Hipparchus, Hippias Minor, Theages
- Paul Woodruff – Hippias Major, Ion, Phaedrus, Symposium

==== Translators of Plotinus ====
The Enneads are Plotinus' only work.

- E. R. Dodds
- Stephen MacKenna (1930)

==== Translators of Plutarch ====
- Arthur Hugh Clough – Parallel Lives (1859; revision of Dryden's version)
- John Dryden – Parallel Lives (1683; mainly translated by others, with Dryden as editor)
- Elizabeth I – Moralia (part)
- Philemon Holland – Moralia (1603)
- Ian Scott-Kilvert – parts of Parallel Lives (1960 and 1965)
- Rex Warner – Parallel Lives (1958), Moralia (1971)

==== Translators of Polybius ====
- Ian Scott-Kilvert – Histories (1979)

==== Translators of Porphyry of Tyre ====
- Jonathan Barnes – Introduction
- E. R. Dodds

==== Translators of Ptolemy ====
- R. Catesby Taliaferro – Almagest (1952)
- Gerald J. Toomer – Almagest (1984)

==== Translators of Sappho ====
Sappho's work survives only in fragments.

- Willis Barnstone (1965, 1997, 2006, 2009)
- Anne Carson (2002)
- Richmond Lattimore (1949)

==== Translators of Sophocles ====
- George Adams – complete plays (1729)
- Robert Bagg – Oedipus Rex, Oedipus at Colonus, Antigone (all 2004), Women of Trachis, Electra (both 2011)
- Theodore Alois Buckley – complete plays (1849)
- Anne Carson – Electra (2001), Antigone (2015)
- Kelly Cherry – Antigone (1998)
- Richard Claverhouse Jebb – complete plays (1883–1896)
- Peter Constantine – Oedipus Rex, Oedipus at Colonus, Antigone (all 2007)
- Albert Spaulding Cook – Oedipus Rex (1957)
- John Dryden – Oedipus Rex (1679, as Oedipus)
- Robert Fagles – Oedipus Rex, Oedipus at Colonus, Antigone (all 1982)
- Ruth Fainlight – Oedipus Rex, Oedipus at Colonus, Antigone (all 2009, with Robert J. Littman)
- Dudley Fitts – Oedipus at Colonus (1941, with Robert Fitzgerald)
- Edward FitzGerald – Oedipus Rex, Oedipus at Colonus (1881–1882)
- Robert Fitzgerald – Oedipus at Colonus (1941, with Dudley Fitts)
- Thomas Francklin – complete plays (1759)
- George Garrett – Oedipus at Colonus (1999)
- David Grene – Oedipus Rex (1942), Electra, Philoctetes (both 1957), Antigone (1970)
- Peter Meineck – Oedipus Rex (2000, with Paul Woodruff), Oedipus at Colonus (2003), Electra, Philoctetes, Ajax, Women of Trachis (all 2007, with Paul Woodruff)
- Gilbert Murray – Oedipus Rex (1911), Antigone (1941), Women of Trachis (1947), Oedipus at Colonus (1948)
- Robert Potter – complete plays (1788)
- Ezra Pound – Women of Trachis (1956)
- Paul Roche – Oedipus Rex, Oedipus at Colonus, Antigone (all 1958), Ajax, Women of Trachis, Electra, Philoctetes (all 2001)
- James Scully – Ajax, Philoctetes (both 2011)
- Thomas Sheridan – Philoctetes (1725)
- David R. Slavitt – Antigone, Oedipus Rex, Oedipus at Colonus (all 2007), Ajax, Women of Trachis, Electra, Philoctetes (all 2013)
- Alan Sommerstein – selected fragmentary plays (2006, 2012)
- Isaac William Stuart – Oedipus Rex (1837)
- Don Taylor – Oedipus Rex (1986)
- Lewis Theobald – Electra (1714), Ajax, Oedipus Rex (both 1715)
- E. F. Watling – Oedipus Rex, Oedipus at Colonus, Antigone (all 1947), Ajax, Electra, Women of Trachis, Philoctetes (all 1953)
- Paul Woodruff – Oedipus Rex (2000, with Peter Meineck), Antigone (2001), Electra, Philoctetes, Ajax, Women of Trachis (all 2007, with Peter Meineck)

==== Translators of Theophrastus ====
- Richard Claverhouse Jebb – Characters (1870)
- Phillip Vellacott – Characters (1967)

==== Translators of Thucydides ====
The History of the Peloponnesian War is Thucydides' only work.

- Richard Crawley (1874)
- Thomas Hobbes (1628)
- Benjamin Jowett (1881)
- William Smith (1753)
- Rex Warner (1954)

==== Translators of Xenophon ====
- William Barker – Cyropaedia (1567)
- Philemon Holland – Cyropaedia (1632)
- W. H. D. Rouse – Anabasis
- Rex Warner – Anabasis (1949), Hellenica (1950)

=== Translators of ancient Hebrew ===
==== Translators of the Talmud ====
- Nina Salaman (selections)

=== Translators of classical Latin ===
- Henry Becher – Prosper of Aquitaine (authorship of original wrongly attributed to Ambrose)
- Kelly Cherry – Octavia (1995)
- E. F. Watling – Octavia (1966)

==== Translators of Ammianus Marcellinus ====
- Philemon Holland (1613)

==== Translators of the Appendix Vergiliana ====
- David R. Slavitt (2011, selections)

==== Translators of Apuleius ====
- William Adlington
- Robert Graves

==== Translators of Augustine ====
- Alfred the Great – Soliloquies of Augustine
- Henry Chadwick – Confessions (1991)
- Edward Bouverie Pusey – Confessions (1838)
- R. Catesby Taliaferro – On Music (1947)
- Rex Warner – Confessions (1963)

==== Translators of Ausonius ====
- David R. Slavitt – epigrams (1998)

==== Translators of Avianus ====
- David R. Slavitt (1993)

==== Translators of Boethius ====
- Alfred the Great – On the Consolation of Philosophy
- Geoffrey Chaucer – On the Consolation of Philosophy (as Boece, late 14th century)
- Elizabeth I – On the Consolation of Philosophy
- David R. Slavitt – On the Consolation of Philosophy (2008)
- John Walton – On the Consolation of Philosophy (1410)

==== Translators of Julius Caesar ====
- Rex Warner – Commentarii de Bello Gallico (1960), Commentarii de Bello Civili (1960)

==== Translators of Catullus ====
- Daisy Dunn (2016)
- Horace Gregory (1931)
- Roz Kaveney (2018)
- Charles Martin (1990)
- Stephen Mitchell (2024)

==== Translators of Cicero ====
- Thomas Cooke – De Natura Deorum (1737)
- Elizabeth I – Epistulae ad Familiares (2.6, c.1579), Pro Marcello
- Thomas Francklin – De Natura Deorum (1741)

==== Translators of Claudian ====
- David R. Slavitt – De raptu Proserpinae (1997)

==== Translators of Horace ====
- Thomas Drant – Ars Poetica (1567), Epistles (1566), Odes
- Stephen Harrison (classicist)
- Burton Raffel
- David R. Slavitt – Odes (2014)
- David West

==== Translators of Juvenal ====
- George Chapman – Satires 5 (1629)
- John Dryden – Satires 1, 3, 6, 10 and 16 (1693)
- Peter Green – Satires
- Rolfe Humphries – Satires (1959)
- Robert Lowell – Satires 10

==== Translators of Livy ====
- Philemon Holland (1600)
- Betty Radice – Books VI–X (1982)

==== Translators of Lucan ====
- Robert Graves (prose version)
- Christopher Marlowe – translated Book One of Lucan's Bellum Civile
- Nicholas Rowe – produced a complete translation (1718)

==== Translators of Lucretius ====
NB: His only work was De rerum natura.

==== Translators of Marcus Aurelius ====
The Meditations are Marcus Aurelius' only work.

- George Grube

==== Translators of Martial ====
- Rolfe Humphries – Epigrams (1963, selections)
- Peter Porter – Epigrams (1972)

==== Translators of Ovid ====
- William Caxton – Metamorphoses (1480)
- John Dryden – selections from Metamorphoses (1700)
- Arthur Golding – Metamorphoses (1567)
- Horace Gregory – Metamorphoses (1958), Amores (1964), Remedia Amoris (1964), Ars Amatoria (1964)
- Seamus Heaney – Metamorphoses (1993)
- Rolfe Humphries – Metamorphoses (1955), Ars Amatoria (1957)
- Allen Mandelbaum – Metamorphoses (1993)
- Charles Martin – Metamorphoses (2005)
- George Sandys – Metamorphoses (1626)
- David R. Slavitt – Tristia (1986), Epistulae ex Ponto (1989, selections), Metamorphoses (1994), Amores (2011), Remedia Amoris (2011), Heroides (2011)

==== Translators of Persius ====
- John Dryden – Satires (1693)
- W. S. Merwin – Satires (1960)

==== Translators of Petronius ====
The Satyricon is Petronius's only work.

- William Arrowsmith (1959)

==== Translators of Plautus ====
- Thomas Cooke – Amphitryon (1746)
- Douglass Parker – Bacchides, Menaechmi (both 1999)
- E. F. Watling – Rudens, Amphitryon, Mostellaria, Trinummus (all 1964), Aulularia, Captivi, Menaechmi, Miles Gloriosus, Pseudolus (all 1965)

==== Translators of Pliny the Elder ====
- Philemon Holland (1601)

==== Translators of Pliny the Younger ====
- Betty Radice – Epistulae (1963)

==== Translators of Propertius ====
The Elegies are Propertius' only work.

- Ezra Pound
- David R. Slavitt (2002)

==== Translators of Prudentius ====
- David R. Slavitt – Liber Cathemerinon (1996)

==== Translators of Seneca the Younger ====
- Elizabeth I – Epistulae Morales (no. 107, c.1567), Hercules Oetaeus (part, c.1589)
- Dana Gioia – Hercules Furens (1995)
- Rachel Hadas – Hercules Oetaeus (1995)
- David R. Slavitt – Troades (1992), Thyestes (1992), Phaedra (1992), Medea (1992), Agamemnon (1992), Phoenissae (1995)
- E. F. Watling – Thyestes, Phaedra, Troades, Oedipus (all 1966)

==== Translators of Statius ====
- David R. Slavitt – Achilleid (1997)

==== Translators of Suetonius ====
- Robert Graves
- Philemon Holland (1606)

==== Translators of Tacitus ====
- Elizabeth I – Annals

==== Translators of Terence ====
- Thomas Cooke – complete plays (1734)
- Douglass Parker – Eunuchus, Phormio (both 1974)
- Betty Radice – Eunuchus (1965), Hecyra (1965), Adelphoe (1965), Heauton Timorumenos (1967), Andria (1967), Phormio (1967)

==== Translators of Tibullus ====
- David R. Slavitt – Elegies to Delia from Book 1 (1985)

==== Translators of Valerius Flaccus ====
The Argonautica is Valerius Flaccus' only work.

- David R. Slavitt (1999)

==== Translators of Virgil ====
- Frederick Ahl
- Charles J. Billson – Aeneid (1906)
- William Caxton – Aeneid (1490, as Eneydos)
- Cecil Day-Lewis (complete works)
- Patrick Dickinson
- Gavin Douglas – Aeneid (into Scots)
- John Dryden (complete works)
- Robert Fagles
- Seamus Heaney – Aeneid Book VI
- Henry Howard, Earl of Surrey (two books of the Aeneid into blank verse)
- Rolfe Humphries – Aeneid (1951)
- Kimberly Johnson – Georgics (2009)
- W. F. Jackson Knight
- Stanley Lombardo
- Allen Mandelbaum – Aeneid (1981)
- Clyde Pharr
- Sarah Ruden
- C. H. Sisson
- David R. Slavitt – Eclogues (1971), Georgics (1972)

== Translators of early medieval literature (6th to 9th centuries CE) ==
=== Translators of early medieval Arabic ===
- Arthur John Arberry – Mu'allaqat

=== Translators of early medieval Chinese ===
- Willis Barnstone – Wang Wei
- Jonathan Chaves – Zhang Ji
- Chung Ling – Li Ye, Wu Zetian, Xue Tao, Yu Xuanji
- Thomas Cleary – Wu Cailuan, Cui Shaoxuan, Zuowanglun
- David Hinton – Bai Juyi, Du Fu, Li Bai, Meng Jiao, Wang Wei
- Carolyn Kizer – Du Fu
- Lin Yutang – Bai Juyi, Liu Zongyuan, Wang Wei, Yingying's Biography
- A. Charles Muller – Guifeng Zongmi
- Red Pine – Bodhidharma, Hanshan, Three Hundred Tang Poems, Wei Yingwu
- Ezra Pound – Li Bai
- Kenneth Rexroth – Du Fu, Li Ye, Six Dynasties poets, Wu Zetian, Xue Tao, Yu Xuanji
- Arthur Waley – The Tale of Li Wa, Yingying's Biography
- Burton Watson – Du Fu, Hanshan, Lu Yu

=== Translators of early medieval Greek ===
- George Chapman – Musaeus Grammaticus

=== Translators of early medieval Hebrew ===
- Nina Salaman – Eleazar beRabbi Qallir, selections from the Midrash Rabba

=== Translators of Old Irish ===
- Thomas Cleary – Triads of Ireland
- Thomas Kinsella – Saint Patrick's Breastplate
- Frank O'Connor – poetry

=== Translators of early medieval Japanese ===
- Jane Hirshfield and Mariko Aratani – Ono no Komachi
- Donald Philippi – Kojiki, norito prayers
- Kenneth Rexroth
- Edward Seidensticker – Michitsuna's mother
- Royall Tyler – The Tales of Ise
- Arthur Waley – Man'yōshū (selections)

=== Translators of Old Korean ===
- A. Charles Muller – Woncheuk, Wonhyo

=== Translators of early medieval Latin ===
- Alfred the Great, Werferth, and Plegmund – Pope Gregory I
- Albert Stanburrough Cook – Asser

== Translators of medieval literature (10th to 14th centuries) ==
- J. Thomas Rimer and Jonathan Chaves – Wakan rōeishū (1997, an 11th-century bilingual Chinese and Japanese poetry anthology)

=== Translators of Anglo-Norman ===
- Robert Copland – Hugh of Rhuddlan

=== Translators of medieval Arabic ===
- Arthur John Arberry – Al-Mutanabbi, Rayat al-mubarrizin wa-ghayat al-mumayyazin
- Reynold A. Nicholson – Ibn Arabi

=== Translators of medieval Chinese ===
- Jonathan Chaves – Wen Tong, Yang Wanli, Mei Yaochen
- Chung Ling – Guan Daosheng, Li Qingzhao
- Thomas Cleary – Sun Bu'er, Zhang Sanfeng
- Lin Yutang – Li Qingzhao, Su Shi
- Red Pine – Platform Sutra, Shiwu
- Kenneth Rexroth – Song dynasty poets including Guan Daosheng, Li Qingzhao
- Burton Watson – Lu You, Su Shi

==== Translators of Water Margin ====
- Pearl Buck (1933)

=== Translators of Old East Slavic ===
- Vladimir Nabokov – The Tale of Igor's Campaign

=== Translators of Old English (10th to mid-12th centuries) ===
- Albert Stanburrough Cook – Judith
- Kevin Crossley-Holland – The Battle of Maldon, The Dream of the Rood, The Seafarer, The Wanderer
- Ezra Pound – The Seafarer

=== Translators of Middle English (mid-12th to 15th centuries) ===
- John Gardner – Alliterative Morte Arthure, The Debate between Body and Soul, The Parlement of the Thre Ages, Somer Soneday, The Thrush and the Nightingale, Wynnere and Wastoure (all 1971)

==== Translators of Geoffrey Chaucer ====
- Burton Raffel

==== Translators of the Gawain Poet (Pearl Poet) ====
- Burton Raffel – Sir Gawain and the Green Knight (2009)
- John Gardner – Pearl, Patience, Cleanness, St. Erkenwald (all 1965)
- W. S. Merwin – Sir Gawain and the Green Knight (2002)
- J. R. R. Tolkien – Sir Gawain and the Green Knight, Pearl (both a.1973, published 1975)

==== Translators of William Langland ====
Piers Plowman is Langland's only known work.

- E. Talbot Donaldson (1949)

==== Translators of Layamon's Brut ====
- Frederic Madden (1847)

==== Translators of Sir Orfeo ====
- J. R. R. Tolkien (a.1973, published 1975)

==== Translators of The Owl and the Nightingale ====
- John Gardner (1971)

=== Translators of Old French and early Middle French ===
- William Atkinson – Thomas à Kempis (from French translation of Latin original)
- William Caxton – Geoffroy IV de la Tour Landry, Raoul Lefèvre
- Andrew Chertsey
- Robert Copland
- Eleanor Hull, Lady Hull – commentary on the penitential psalms, prayers, and meditations (the first known female translator from French to English)
- W. S. Merwin – Robert the Devil (1981, from the 14th-century play version)
- Sarah Jane Murray – L'Ovide moralisé
- Ezra Pound – Arnaut Daniel
- James Yonge – Secretum Secretorum (from French translation)

==== Translators of Chrétien de Troyes ====
- Burton Raffel

==== Translators of Christine de Pizan ====
- Brian Anslay – The Book of the City of Ladies

==== Translators of Roman de la Rose ====
- Geoffrey Chaucer

==== Translators of the Song of Roland ====
- W. S. Merwin (1963)

=== Translators of Middle High German ===
==== Translators of the Nibelungenlied ====
- Aubertine Woodward Moore
- Burton Raffel

=== Translators of medieval Hebrew ===
- Abraham Regelson – Judah Halevi
- Nina Salaman – Abraham ibn Ezra, Joseph ben Samuel Bonfils, Judah Halevi, the Machzor, Meir of Rothenburg, Solomon ibn Gabirol
- David R. Slavitt – Solomon ibn Gabirol

=== Translators of medieval Irish ===
- Seamus Heaney – Buile Shuibhne
- Thomas Kinsella – Longes mac n-Uislenn from the Ulster Cycle
- Frank O'Connor – poetry

==== Translators of the Táin Bó Cúailnge ====
- Thomas Kinsella

=== Translators of medieval Italian ===
- Robert Dallington – Francesco Colonna
- Ezra Pound – Guido Cavalcanti
- David R. Slavitt – Guido Cavalcanti

==== Translators of Giovanni Boccaccio ====
- John Dryden – selections from the Decameron (1700)
- David R. Slavitt – Eclogues (2010)

==== Translators of Petrarch ====
- George Chapman – Penitential Psalms
- David R. Slavitt – sonnets and shorter poems (2012)
- Thomas Wyatt

==== Translators of Giorgio Vasari ====
- Evangeline Wilbour Blashfield – translated Lives of the Painters (4 vols., 1897)

=== Translators of medieval Japanese ===
- Donald Keene – Yoshida Kenkō, The Tale of the Bamboo Cutter
- W. S. Merwin and Sōiku Shigematsu – Musō Soseki
- Ivan Morris – Sarashina Nikki
- A. Charles Muller – Dōgen
- Kenneth Rexroth
- Royall Tyler – Kasuga Gongen Genki E, The Tale of Heiji, The Tale of Hōgen, The Tale of the Heike
- Arthur Waley – Kokin Wakashū (selections)
- Burton Watson – Nichiren, Saigyō, The Tale of the Heike

==== Translators of Sei Shōnagon ====
- Ivan Morris
- Kenneth Rexroth
- Arthur Waley

==== Translators of The Tale of Genji ====
- Donald Keene
- Edward Seidensticker
- Royall Tyler
- Arthur Waley

=== Translators of medieval Korean ===
- Robert Buswell Jr. – Jinul
- A. Charles Muller – Jinul, Kihwa

=== Translators of medieval Latin ===
- Stephen Batman – Bartholomaeus Anglicus
- William Caxton – Jacobus de Cessolis, Jacobus de Voragine
- David R. Slavitt – Gregorio Correr
- John Trevisa – Ranulf Higden
- James Yonge – Gerald of Wales

==== Translators of Peter Abelard and Heloise ====
- Betty Radice (letters)

==== Translators of Thomas Aquinas ====
- Ralph McInerny

==== Translators of Erasmus ====
- Myles Coverdale
- Betty Radice

==== Translators of Geoffrey of Monmouth ====
- Sebastian Evans
- Robert John Stewart
- Aaron Thompson
- Lewis Thorpe

=== Translators of medieval Manx ===
- Jennifer Kewley Draskau – Manannan Ballad

=== Translators of Old Norse ===
- George Borrow
- Lee M. Hollander – Eyrbyggja saga, Fóstbrœðra saga, Heimskringla, Jómsvíkinga saga, Kormáks saga, Njáls saga, Ögmundar þáttr dytts, Poetic Edda, Víga-Glúms saga
- George Benson Johnston – Færeyinga saga, Gísla saga, Saga of the Greenlanders
- Gwyn Jones – Egil's Saga, Hænsa-Þóris saga, Hrafnkels saga, Kjalnesinga saga, Saga of Erik the Red, Þorsteins saga hvíta, Vápnfirðinga saga, Vatnsdæla saga
- Magnus Magnusson and Hermann Pálsson – Njáls saga, Haralds saga Sigurðarsonar, Laxdæla saga, Saga of Erik the Red, Saga of the Greenlanders
- Hermann Pálsson and Paul Edwards – Egil's Saga, Eymundar þáttr hrings, Eyrbyggja saga, Gautreks saga, Göngu-Hrólfs saga, Hrólfs saga Gautrekssonar, Knýtlinga saga, Landnámabók, Orkneyinga Saga, Ǫrvar-Odds saga, Yngvars saga víðförla

=== Translators of medieval Persian ===
- Dick Davis and Afkham Darband – Ferdowsi
- Edward FitzGerald – Jami
- Rebecca Gould – Hasan Sijzi
- William Jones – Hafez
- Reynold A. Nicholson – Ali al-Hujwiri
- Wheeler Thackston – Nasir Khusraw, Saadi Shirazi

==== Translators of Attar of Nishapur ====
- Arthur John Arberry
- Dick Davis and Afkham Darband
- Edward FitzGerald
- Sholeh Wolpé

==== Translators of Omar Khayyam ====
- Arthur John Arberry
- Edward FitzGerald
- Robert Graves
- John Heath-Stubbs

==== Translators of Rumi ====
- Arthur John Arberry
- Reynold A. Nicholson

=== Translators of Old Spanish ===
- W. S. Merwin – ballads (1961)

==== Translators of Cantar de mio Cid ====
- W. S. Merwin (1959)

=== Translators of medieval Vietnamese ===
- Burton Raffel – Không Lộ, Lý Thái Tông, Trần Nhân Tông, Trần Quang Khải, Trần Thánh Tông

=== Translators of Middle Welsh ===
==== Translators of Y Gododdin ====
- Kenneth H. Jackson

==== Translators of the Mabinogion ====
- Charlotte Guest
- Gwyn Jones

=== Translators of medieval Yiddish ===
- Joachim Neugroschel

== Translators of early modern literature (15th to 17th centuries) ==
=== Translators of Middle Armenian ===
- Ewald Osers – Nahapet Kuchak

=== Translators of Old Catalan ===
- David H. Rosenthal – Tirant lo Blanch

=== Translators of early modern Chinese ===
- Cary Baynes – The Secret of the Golden Flower (via the German of Richard Wilhelm)
- Jonathan Chaves – Yuan Hongdao, Wu Li
- Chung Ling – Ma Shouzhen, Wang Wei
- Thomas Cleary – Anthology on Cultivation of Realization, Hong Zicheng, The Secret of the Golden Flower
- Kenneth Rexroth – Ma Shouzhen
- Lin Yutang – including Jin Shengtan, Li Yu, Wang Wei

==== Translators of Journey to the West ====
- Arthur Waley

=== Translators of early modern Dutch ===
- Laurence Andrewe
- Myles Coverdale – William Gnapheus

=== Translators of Middle French ===
- Edward Aggas
- John Alday
- John Alford – Adrian Le Roy
- Peter Allibond — Jean Delespine
- Robert Ashley – Louis le Roy
- Thomas Bowes – Pierre de La Primaudaye
- John Brooke – Guido de Bres, Pierre Viret
- Charles Cotterell – La Calprenède
- Elizabeth I – Marguerite de Navarre
- Robert Fills – including Theodore Beza
- Sir Thomas North – Jacques Amyot (Plutarch's Parallel Lives (1580) from Amyot's French; this was the version William Shakespeare used as a source for his Roman plays)

==== Translators of John Calvin ====
- Elizabeth I – Institutes of the Christian Religion

==== Translators of Cyrano de Bergerac ====
- Curtis Hidden Page

==== Translators of Molière ====
- Joachim Neugroschel
- Curtis Hidden Page

==== Translators of Michel de Montaigne ====
- J. M. Cohen
- Charles Cotton
- John Florio
- Donald M. Frame
- Wyatt Mason
- M. A. Screech

==== Translators of François Rabelais ====
- J. M. Cohen
- Donald M. Frame
- Samuel Putnam
- Burton Raffel
- M. A. Screech
- Thomas Urquhart and Pierre Antoine Motteux

=== Translators of early modern German ===
- John Brooke – Martin Luther, Philipp Melanchthon
- Myles Coverdale – Heinrich Bullinger, Martin Luther, Andreas Osiander, Otto Werdmüller
- Richard Eden – Sebastian Münster
- Douglas Robinson – Gottfried Wilhelm Leibniz, Martin Luther

=== Translators of early modern Irish ===
- Thomas Kinsella – poetry
- Frank O'Connor – poetry

=== Translators of early modern Italian ===
- Robert Ashley – Christoforo Borri, Virgilio Malvezzi
- William Aylesbury and Charles Cotterell – Enrico Caterino Davila
- Anne Bacon – Bernardino Ochino
- William Barker – Lodovico Domenichi, Giambattista Gelli
- Richard Eden – Peter Martyr d'Anghiera, Vannoccio Biringuccio, Ludovico di Varthema
- Raymond Rosenthal – Pietro Aretino
- David R. Slavitt – Pietro Bembo

==== Translators of Ludovico Ariosto ====
- David R. Slavitt – Orlando Furioso (2009)

==== Translators of Niccolò Machiavelli ====
- Peter Constantine
- George Godfrey Cunningham

==== Translators of Torquato Tasso ====
- Richard Carew – Jerusalem Delivered
- Edward Fairfax – Jerusalem Delivered

=== Translators of early modern Japanese ===
- Jonathan Chaves – Ishikawa Jōzan
- Thomas Cleary – Yagyū Munenori, Miyamoto Musashi, Takuan Sōhō
- Ivan Morris – Ihara Saikaku
- Kenneth Rexroth

==== Translators of Matsuo Bashō ====
- Donald Keene
- Lucien Stryk and Takahashi Ikemoto

=== Translators of early modern Latin ===
- Edward Aglionby – Matteo Gribaldi
- Edmund Allen – Alexander Ales, Philipp Melanchthon, Konrad Pellikan
- Peter Allibond – Hermann Rennecher
- Robert Ashley – Sebastián Fox Morcillo
- Peter Ashton – Paolo Giovio (from Latin translation of Italian original)
- Anne Bacon – John Jewel
- George Bancroft
- Mary Basset – Thomas More
- Stephen Batman – Conrad Lycosthenes
- Henry Bennet – Wolfgang Capito, Simon Grynaeus, Martin Luther, Philipp Melanchthon, Oswald Myconius
- Henry Billingsley – Peter Martyr Vermigli
- John Brooke – Jean Garnier
- Myles Coverdale – Heinrich Bullinger, Johannes Gropper, Martin Luther
- Richard Eden – Jean Taisnier
- Louis J. Gallagher – Nicolas Trigault's translation of Matteo Ricci
- David R. Slavitt – Jean Daurat, John Owen

==== Translators of René Descartes ====
- John Cottingham, Robert Stoothoff and Dugald Murdoch
- Elizabeth Haldane, G. R. T. Ross

==== Translators of Gottfried Wilhelm Leibniz ====
- Peter Remnant and Jonathan Bennett

==== Translators of John Milton ====
- David R. Slavitt – Latin poems (2011)

==== Translators of Baruch Spinoza ====
- George Eliot – Ethics (1856)

=== Translators of early modern Persian ===
- Wheeler Thackston – Abul Fazl, Jahangir

=== Translators of early modern Polish ===
- Seamus Heaney and Stanisław Barańczak – Jan Kochanowski

=== Translators of Middle Scots ===
- Seamus Heaney – Robert Henryson

=== Translators of Early Modern Spanish ===
- Robert Ashley – Miguel de Luna
- Willis Barnstone – John of the Cross, Juana Inés de la Cruz, Luis de León, Francisco de Quevedo
- Richard Carew – Juan Huarte de San Juan
- J. M. Cohen – Teresa of Ávila, Bernal Díaz del Castillo, Christopher Columbus, Fernando de Rojas, Agustín de Zárate
- Charles Cotterell – Juan de Palafox y Mendoza
- Richard Eden – Martín Cortés de Albacar
- Ruth Fainlight and Alan Sillitoe – Lope de Vega
- Edward FitzGerald – Pedro Calderón de la Barca
- Lucia Graves – Christopher Columbus (Columbus's letter on the first voyage)
- Edith Grossman – Luis de Góngora, Juana Inés de la Cruz
- James Mabbe – Mateo Alemán, Fernando de Rojas
- W. S. Merwin – Lazarillo de Tormes, Lope de Rueda
- David R. Slavitt – João Pinto Delgado
- John Sturrock – María de Zayas

==== Translators of Miguel de Cervantes ====
- J. M. Cohen
- Alexander J. Duffield
- Edith Grossman (2003)
- John D. Rutherford (also a translator of Galician)
- Charles Jervas
- James Mabbe
- Pierre Antoine Motteux
- John Ormsby (later revised by Joseph R. Jones and Kenneth Douglas)
- Samuel Putnam
- Burton Raffel
- Thomas Shelton
- Tobias Smollett
- Walter Starkie
- Henry Edward Watts

=== Translators of early modern Turkish ===
- George Borrow – Fuzuli

=== Translators of early modern Vietnamese ===
- Burton Raffel – Nguyễn Bỉnh Khiêm, Nguyễn Trãi

=== Translators of early modern Yiddish ===
- Joachim Neugroschel – including Glückel of Hameln

== Translators of late modern literature (18th and 19th centuries) ==
=== Translators of late modern Ainu ===
- Donald Philippi – folk epics

=== Translators of late modern Armenian ===
- Leon Surmelian – Daredevils of Sassoun (from version collected in 19th century; the oral tradition is older), Armenian folktales

=== Translators of late modern Bengali ===
==== Translators of Michael Madhusudan Dutt ====
- William Radice

=== Translators of late modern Chinese ===
- Chung Ling – Qiu Jin, Wu Zao
- Thomas Cleary – Spiritual Alchemy for Women (1899 Taoist treatise)
- Kenneth Rexroth – Qiu Jin, Wu Zao
- Lin Yutang – including Shen Fu, Wang Kaiyun

==== Translators of Cao Xueqin ====
- Lin Yutang

=== Translators of late modern Danish ===
- George Borrow – Adam Oehlenschläger

==== Translators of Hans Christian Andersen ====
- Anthea Bell
- Stephen Mitchell

==== Translators of Søren Kierkegaard ====
- Alastair Hannay
- Lee M. Hollander
- Howard V. Hong and Edna H. Hong
- David F. Swenson

=== Translators of late modern Finnish ===
- George Borrow
- Edward Dundas Butler – Bernhard Fredrik Godenhjelm
- Douglas Robinson – Aleksis Kivi

=== Translators of late modern French ===
- Robert Baldick – Goncourt Journal, Joris-Karl Huysmans, Auguste Villiers de l'Isle-Adam
- Keith Botsford – Jules Michelet
- Patricia Claxton – Jacques Hébert
- Tina Kover – Edmond de Goncourt, Jules de Goncourt
- W. S. Merwin – Nicolas Chamfort, Alain-René Lesage, Pierre de Marivaux
- Aubertine Woodward Moore – Victor Cherbuliez
- Joachim Neugroschel – Marquis de Sade
- Ezra Pound – Bernard Le Bovier de Fontenelle
- Francis Steegmuller – Charles Augustin Sainte-Beuve
- Sarah Elizabeth Utterson – Fantasmagoriana
- Adolf Zytogorski – Edmond de Pressensé

==== Translators of Honoré de Balzac ====
- Richard Howard

==== Translators of Charles Baudelaire ====
- Michael Hamburger
- Richard Howard
- Louise Varèse

==== Translators of François-René de Chateaubriand ====
- Robert Baldick

==== Translators of Alexandre Dumas ====
- Tina Kover
- Joachim Neugroschel

==== Translators of Gustave Flaubert ====
- Robert Baldick
- Lydia Davis
- Francis Steegmuller

==== Translators of Victor Hugo ====
- David Bellos
- Norman Denny
- Isabel Florence Hapgood
- John Sturrock
- Charles Edwin Wilbour

==== Translators of Stéphane Mallarmé ====
- Mary Ann Caws

==== Translators of Guy de Maupassant ====
- Richard Howard
- Joachim Neugroschel

==== Translators of Arthur Rimbaud ====
- Wyatt Mason
- Louise Varèse

==== Translators of Jean-Jacques Rousseau ====
- Peter Constantine
- J. M. Cohen

==== Translators of George Sand ====
- Tina Kover

==== Translators of Stendhal ====
- Richard Howard
- Burton Raffel
- John Sturrock
- Louise Varèse

==== Translators of Alexis de Tocqueville ====
- Arthur Goldhammer

==== Translators of Jules Verne ====
- Robert Baldick
- Richard Howard
- Frank Wynne

==== Translators of Voltaire ====
- Peter Constantine

==== Translators of Émile Zola ====
- Ann Davies
- Havelock Ellis
- Arthur Goldhammer
- Mark Kurlansky
- Mary J. Serrano
- Ernest Alfred Vizetelly

=== Translators of late modern German ===
- Constance Bache – Hans von Bülow, Frédéric Chopin, Engelbert Humperdinck, Johann Christian Lobe, Robert Schumann, Richard Wagner
- Susan Bernofsky – Jeremias Gotthelf, Wolfgang Amadeus Mozart
- George Borrow – Friedrich Maximilian von Klinger
- Thomas Carlyle – Friedrich de la Motte Fouqué, Johann Karl August Musäus, Jean Paul, Ludwig Tieck
- Robert Seymour Conway – Karl Brugmann
- Albert Stanburrough Cook – Eduard Sievers
- George Godfrey Cunningham – Johann August Apel, Johann Gustav Gottlieb Büsching, Christian Gottfried Körner, Friedrich Laun, Friederike Lohmann, Caroline de la Motte Fouqué, Friedrich de la Motte Fouqué, Henrik Steffens, Ludwig Tieck, Carl Weisflog, Johann Rudolf Wyss
- George Eliot – Ludwig Feuerbach, David Strauss
- Michael Hamburger – Ludwig van Beethoven, Friedrich Hölderlin
- Mary E. Ireland – Elisabeth Philippine Karoline von Dewitz, Gustav Nieritz, Emmy von Rhoden
- Aubertine Woodward Moore – Robert von Bayer
- Natias Neutert – Joseph Freiherr von Eichendorff
- Katherine Raleigh – August Heinrich Petiscus
- Douglas Robinson – Johann Gottfried Herder, Wilhelm von Humboldt, Novalis, August Wilhelm Schlegel
- W. H. D. Rouse – Karl Brugmann
- Barbara Wright – Christian Dietrich Grabbe
- Adolf Zytogorski – Johann Karl August Musäus, Carl Franz van der Velde

==== Translators of Johann Wolfgang von Goethe ====
- Walter W. Arndt
- W. H. Auden and Elizabeth Mayer
- Victor Lange
- Louise Bogan
- Thomas Carlyle
- Michael Hamburger
- Michael Hulse
- Albert George Latham
- Henry Wadsworth Longfellow
- Louis MacNeice
- Christopher Middleton
- Aubertine Woodward Moore – Erlkönig
- Burton Pike
- Douglas Robinson
- Percy Bysshe Shelley
- Bayard Taylor

==== Translators of the Brothers Grimm ====
- George Godfrey Cunningham
- Ralph Manheim
- Stephen Mitchell

==== Translators of Heinrich Heine ====
- Douglas Robinson (poetry)
- Herman George Scheffauer

==== Translators of E. T. A. Hoffmann ====
- Anthea Bell
- Thomas Carlyle
- Ralph Manheim
- Joachim Neugroschel

==== Translators of Immanuel Kant ====
- Mary J. Gregor
- Allen Wood and Paul Guyer
- Max Mueller
- Norman Kemp Smith

==== Translators of Friedrich Nietzsche ====
- Thomas Common
- R. J. Hollingdale
- Walter Kaufmann
- Herman George Scheffauer
- Shaun Whiteside

==== Translators of Friedrich Wilhelm Joseph Schelling ====
- Andrew Bowie

==== Translators of Friedrich Schleiermacher ====
- Andrew Bowie
- Douglas Robinson

==== Translators of Arthur Schopenhauer ====
- R. B. Haldane
- Douglas Robinson

=== Translators of late modern Hungarian ===
- Edward Dundas Butler – Hungarian poems and fables, János Arany

=== Translators of late modern Irish ===
- Seamus Heaney – Brian Merriman
- Kenneth H. Jackson – various pieces in A Celtic Miscellany
- Thomas Kinsella – poetry
- Frank O'Connor – poetry including Brian Merriman, Eibhlín Dubh Ní Chonaill

=== Translators of late modern Italian ===
- Raymond Rosenthal – Giovanni Verga
- William Weaver – Arrigo Boito, Giuseppe Verdi

==== Translators of Giacomo Leopardi ====
- Richard Dixon
- Jonathan Galassi
- Ann Goldstein

==== Translators of Giambattista Vico ====
- Thomas Goddard Bergin and Max Harold Fisch

=== Translators of late modern Japanese ===
- Donald Keene – Chikamatsu Monzaemon
- W. S. Merwin – Yosa Buson
- Kenneth Rexroth
- Burton Watson – Ryōkan

=== Translators of late modern Manchu ===
- George Borrow – Qianlong Emperor

=== Translators of late modern Norwegian ===
- Aubertine Woodward Moore – Bjørnstjerne Bjørnson, Kristofer Janson

=== Translators of late modern Persian ===
- William Jones – Mirza Mehdi Khan Astarabadi (via French translation)

=== Translators of late modern Polish ===
- George Borrow – Adam Mickiewicz
- Jeremiah Curtin – Bolesław Prus
- Louise Varèse – Adam Mickiewicz

=== Translators of late modern Punjabi ===
- Reynold A. Nicholson – Bulleh Shah
- Taufiq Rafat – Bulleh Shah, Qadir Yar

=== Translators of late modern Russian ===
- George Borrow
- Constance Garnett – Ivan Goncharov, Alexander Herzen, Alexander Ostrovsky
- Beatrix Lucia Catherine Tollemache – Dmitry Grigorovich, Nikolai Leskov, Nikolay Nekrasov, Aleksey Konstantinovich Tolstoy

==== Translators of Anton Chekhov ====
- Peter Constantine
- Constance Garnett
- Michael Henry Heim
- Ronald Hingley
- Joachim Neugroschel

==== Translators of Fyodor Dostoyevsky ====
- Ignat Avsey – The Village of Stepanchikovo 1983, The Brothers Karamazov 1994, A Gentle Spirit 1996, Humiliated and Insulted 2008, The Idiot 2010
- Henry and Olga Carlisle
- Ann Dunnigan
- Constance Garnett
- Mirra Ginsburg
- David Magarshack
- David McDuff
- Alan Myers
- Richard Pevear and Larissa Volokhonsky
- Michael Scammell
- Frederick Whishaw

==== Translators of Nikolai Gogol ====
- Peter Constantine
- Constance Garnett
- George Reavey

==== Translators of Mikhail Lermontov ====
- Vladimir Nabokov and Dmitri Nabokov
- Beatrix Lucia Catherine Tollemache

==== Translators of Alexander Pushkin ====
- Walter W. Arndt
- George Borrow
- Alan Myers
- Vladimir Nabokov
- Douglas Robinson – poetry
- Beatrix Lucia Catherine Tollemache
- Adolf Zytogorski

==== Translators of Leo Tolstoy ====
- Peter Constantine
- Ann Dunnigan
- Rosemary Edmonds
- Constance Garnett
- Isabel Florence Hapgood
- David Magarshack
- Louise Maude and Aylmer Maude
- Richard Pevear and Larissa Volokhonsky
- Herman George Scheffauer (letters)

==== Translators of Ivan Turgenev ====
- George Reavey

=== Translators of late modern Scottish Gaelic ===
- George Borrow

=== Translators of late modern Sindhi ===
- Reynold A. Nicholson – Shah Abdul Latif Bhittai

=== Translators of late modern Swedish ===
- George Borrow

=== Translators of late modern Ukrainian ===
- George Borrow

=== Translators of late modern Urdu ===
- Musharraf Ali Farooqi – Hamzanama (from 1871 version of medieval original)

=== Translators of late modern Vietnamese ===
- Burton Raffel – Hồ Xuân Hương, Nguyễn Du, Nguyễn Hữu Chỉnh, Nguyễn Khuyến, Trần Tế Xương

=== Translators of late modern Welsh ===
- George Borrow – Ellis Wynne

=== Translators of late modern Yiddish ===
- Joachim Neugroschel – including Isaac Mayer Dick, Jacob Dinezon, Solomon Ettinger, Yitzkhok Yoel Linetzky, Mendele Mocher Sforim, Mordecai Spector

== Translators of contemporary literature (20th century onward) ==
=== Translators of Ainu ===
- Donald Philippi – folk epics

=== Translators of Albanian ===
==== Translators of Ismail Kadare ====
- David Bellos
- Peter Constantine

=== Translators of Basque ===
- Margaret Jull Costa – Bernardo Atxaga

=== Translators of Bengali ===
==== Translators of Upendrakishore Ray Chowdhury ====
- William Radice

==== Translators of Rabindranath Tagore ====
- William Radice
- Rabindranath Tagore – translated many of his own works into English

=== Translators of Bosnian ===
- Will Firth – Faruk Šehić, Bekim Sejranović

=== Translators of Bulgarian ===
- Ewald Osers – Nikola Vaptsarov
- Nadejda Stancioff – memoirs of Anna de Grenaud (Stancioff's mother)

=== Translators of Croatian ===
- Will Firth – Marinko Koščec, Tatjana Gromača, Miroslav Krleža, Robert Perišić, Vedrana Rudan, Ivan B. Vodopija
- Michael Henry Heim – Dubravka Ugrešić

=== Translators of Czech ===
- Willis Barnstone – Bronislava Volková
- Seamus Heaney – Leoš Janáček
- Michael Henry Heim – Josef Hiršal, Jan Neruda
- Ewald Osers – Miroslav Holub, Ivan Klíma, Óndra Łysohorsky, Vítězslav Nezval, Jaroslav Seifert, Jan Skácel
- Frank Wynne – Petr Král

==== Translators of Karel Čapek ====
- Michael Henry Heim
- Ewald Osers

==== Translators of Jaroslav Hašek ====
- Cecil Parrott

==== Translators of Bohumil Hrabal ====
- Michael Henry Heim

==== Translators of Milan Kundera ====
- Michael Henry Heim

=== Translators of Danish ===
- Anthea Bell – Bjarne Reuter

=== Translators of Dutch ===
- Michael Henry Heim – Hugo Claus
- C. J. Stevens – poetry including Paul de Vree

=== Translators of Faroese ===
- George Benson Johnston

=== Translators of Finnish ===
- Douglas Robinson – Elina Hirvonen, Mia Kankimäki, Volter Kilpi, Maaria Koskiluoma, Tuomas Kyrö, Arto Paasilinna, Yrjö Varpio

=== Translators of Flemish ===
- C. J. Stevens – poetry

=== Translators of French ===
- Gilbert Adair – François Truffaut
- Esther Allen – Linda Lê, Consuelo de Saint-Exupéry
- Robert Baldick – Philippe Ariès, Henri Barbusse, Philippe Jullian, Pierre Louÿs, Jules Roy
- Anthea Bell – Anne-Laure Bondoux, Jean-Michel Charlier, René Goscinny (including Asterix)
- David Bellos – Daniel Anselme, Hélène Berr, Frédéric Dard, Paul Fournel, Romain Gary, Delphine Horvilleur, Georges Ifrah, Maxime Rovère, Fred Vargas
- Mary Ann Caws – André Breton, René Char, Robert Desnos, Paul Éluard, Pierre Reverdy, Tristan Tzara
- Patricia Claxton – Nicole Brossard, Jacques Godbout, Naïm Kattan, André Major, Fernand Ouellet, Gérard Pelletier, François Ricard, André Roy, Gabrielle Roy, France Théoret, Pierre-Elliott Trudeau, Marcel Trudel
- J. M. Cohen – Pierre Teilhard de Chardin
- Ruth Fainlight – Jean Joubert
- Sheila Fischman – Quebec literature including Hubert Aquin, Yves Beauchemin, Marie-Claire Blais, Roch Carrier, Dominique Fortier, François Gravel, Anne Hébert, Suzanne Jacob, Jacques Poulin, Kim Thúy, Michel Tremblay
- Grace Frick – Marguerite Yourcenar (her partner)
- Stuart Gilbert – Roger Martin du Gard, André Malraux
- Roland Glasser – Anne Cuneo, Adeline Dieudonné, Fiston Mwanza Mujila, Martin Page
- Arthur Goldhammer – including Marguerite Duras, Thomas Piketty, Michel Tournier
- Wangui wa Goro – Véronique Tadjo
- Daniel Hahn – Philippe Claudel
- Michael Henry Heim – Milan Kundera (Jacques and His Master, originally in French), Henri Troyat
- Richard Howard – including André Breton, Salvador Dalí, Marguerite Duras, Michel Foucault, Charles de Gaulle, Nikos Kazantzakis, Maurice Maeterlinck, Alain Robbe-Grillet, Claude Simon
- Carolyn Kizer – African poetry
- Tina Kover – Anne Berest, Claire Berest, Antoine Compagnon, Maurice G. Dantec, Négar Djavadi, Anna Gavalda, Alexandra Lapierre, Marc Levy, Luis de Miranda, Benoît Peeters, Auguste Rodin
- Max Lawton – Jonathan Littell
- Ralph Manheim – Louis-Ferdinand Céline, Aimé Césaire, Henry Corbin, Romain Gary, Abdallah Laroui, Victor Serge
- Wyatt Mason – Pierre Michon
- W. S. Merwin – Jean Follain
- Ian Monk – Marie Darrieussecq, Yannick Haenel, Camille Laurens, Daniel Pennac, Matthieu Ricard, Jacques Roubaud, Raymond Roussel, Hervé Le Tellier, Trinh Xuan Thuan
- Joachim Neugroschel – Tahar Ben Jelloun
- Ezra Pound – Remy de Gourmont
- George Reavey – Paul Éluard
- Kenneth Rexroth – Oscar Milosz, Pierre Reverdy
- R. B. Russell – Alain-Fournier
- Beatrix Lucia Catherine Tollemache – Adèle Huguenin
- Jean Starr Untermeyer – poetry
- Louise Varèse – Julien Gracq, Saint-John Perse
- Shaun Whiteside – Michel Houellebecq, Patrick Rambaud
- Barbara Wright – including Samuel Beckett, Marguerite Duras, Jean Genet, Alberto Giacometti, Eugène Ionesco, Robert Pinget, Alain Robbe-Grillet, Nathalie Sarraute
- Frank Wynne – including Jean-Baptiste Del Amo, Virginie Despentes, Mathias Énard, Michel Houellebecq, Boualem Sansal, Dominique Sigaud

==== Translators of Roland Barthes ====
- Richard Howard

==== Translators of Georges Bataille ====
- Joachim Neugroschel

==== Translators of Simone de Beauvoir ====
- Richard Howard

==== Translators of Albert Camus ====
- Stuart Gilbert
- Arthur Goldhammer
- Richard Howard

==== Translators of Jean Cocteau ====
- Stuart Gilbert

==== Translators of Jacques Derrida ====
- Geoffrey Bennington
- Peggy Kamuf
- Gayatri Chakravorty Spivak

==== Translators of Anatole France ====
- Curtis Hidden Page

==== Translators of André Gide ====
- Richard Howard

==== Translators of Georges Perec ====
- Gilbert Adair
- David Bellos
- Ian Monk
- John Sturrock

==== Translators of Marcel Proust ====
- Scott Moncrieff, Stephen Hudson, Terence Kilmartin and D. J. Enright
- Joachim Neugroschel
- Christopher Prendergast, with Lydia Davis, Mark Treharne, James Grieve, John Sturrock, Carol Clark, Peter Collier, and Ian Patterson
- Louise Varèse

==== Translators of Raymond Queneau ====
- Gilbert Adair
- Barbara Wright

==== Translators of Antoine de Saint-Exupéry ====
- Stuart Gilbert
- Richard Howard

==== Translators of Jean-Paul Sartre ====
- Robert Baldick
- Stuart Gilbert
- Richard Howard

==== Translators of Georges Simenon ====
- David Bellos
- Stuart Gilbert
- Louise Varèse

=== Translators of Georgian ===
- Rebecca Gould – Alexander Kazbegi, Vazha-Pshavela

=== Translators of German ===
- Anthea Bell – Hans Bemmann, Karen Duve, Hans Magnus Enzensberger, Cornelia Funke, Kerstin Gier, Ruth Hürlimann, Erich Kästner, Kai Meyer, Antonia Michaelis, Christine Nöstlinger, Otfried Preußler, Saša Stanišić, Władysław Szpilman (from German version)
- Susan Bernofsky – Jenny Erpenbeck, Gregor von Rezzori, Paul Scheerbart, Péter Szondi, Yoko Tawada, Robert Walser, Uljana Wolf
- Peter Constantine – Hannah Arendt, Heinrich Blücher, Hans Deichmann, Werner Tiki Küstenmacher, Benjamin Lebert, Bernhard Schlink
- Michael Hamburger – Gottfried Benn, Paul Celan, Hans Magnus Enzensberger, Hugo von Hofmannsthal, Nelly Sachs, Georg Trakl
- Michael Henry Heim – Hans Magnus Enzensberger, Terézia Mora, Bernhard Schlink
- Mary E. Ireland – Bertha Clément, Hermann Nietschmann
- Max Lawton – Michael Lentz
- Ralph Manheim – Alfred Andersch, Hermann Broch, Michael Ende, Werner Haftmann, Konrad Heiden, Adolf Hitler, Léo Lania, Wilhelm Reich, Fritz Sternberg, Kurt Weill
- Joachim Neugroschel – Elias Canetti, Joseph Goebbels, Ernst Jünger, Gregor von Rezzori, Joseph Roth, Leopold von Sacher-Masoch, Albert Schweitzer, Manès Sperber
- Natias Neutert – Gottfried Benn, Joachim Ringelnatz
- Ewald Osers – Rose Ausländer, Thomas Bernhard, Paul Carell, Albrecht Fölsing, Sebastian Haffner, Michael Krüger, Reiner Kunze, Heinz Piontek, Rüdiger Safranski, Richard Strauss (with H. Hammelmann)
- William Radice – Sigfrid Gauch, Martin Kämpchen
- Douglas Robinson – Martin Buber
- Herman George Scheffauer – Otto Braun, Rudolf Herzog, Georg Kaiser, Bernhard Kellermann, Klabund, Rosa Mayreder, Erich Mendelsohn, Bruno Taut
- Jean Starr Untermeyer – Oskar Bie, Hermann Broch
- Leila Vennewitz – Alfred Andersch, Jurek Becker, Nicolas Born, Friedrich Dürrenmatt, Uwe Johnson, Walter Kempowski, Alexander Kluge, Uwe Timm, Martin Walser
- C. V. Wedgwood – Karl Brandi, Elias Canetti
- Shaun Whiteside – Lilian Faschinger, Marlen Haushofer, Walter Kempowski, Gert Ledig, Charles Lewinsky, Ralf Rothmann, Tilman Spengler, Judith Schalansky, Bernhard Schlink, Sybille Steinbacher

==== Translators of Heinrich Böll ====
- Leila Vennewitz

==== Translators of Bertolt Brecht ====
- Michael Hamburger
- Ralph Manheim

==== Translators of Gottlob Frege ====
- Michael Dummett

==== Translators of Sigmund Freud ====
- Anthea Bell
- Ralph Manheim
- Shaun Whiteside

==== Translators of Günter Grass ====
- Peter Constantine
- Michael Hamburger
- Michael Henry Heim
- Ralph Manheim

==== Translators of Peter Handke ====
- Ralph Manheim

==== Translators of Martin Heidegger ====
- Ralph Manheim
- Joan Stambaugh

==== Translators of Hermann Hesse ====
- Susan Bernofsky
- Ralph Manheim
- Joachim Neugroschel
- Leila Vennewitz

==== Translators of Edmund Husserl ====
- J. N. Findlay

==== Translators of Elfriede Jelinek ====
- Joachim Neugroschel

==== Translators of Carl Jung ====
- Cary Baynes and Helton Godwin Baynes
- Ralph Manheim

==== Translators of Franz Kafka ====
- Anthea Bell
- Susan Bernofsky
- Shelley Frisch
- Mark Harman
- Breon Mitchell
- Willa Muir and Edwin Muir
- Joachim Neugroschel
- Malcolm Pasley

==== Translators of Thomas Mann ====
- Peter Constantine
- Michael Henry Heim
- H. T. Lowe-Porter
- Joachim Neugroschel
- Herman George Scheffauer
- John E. Woods

==== Translators of Robert Musil ====
- Shaun Whiteside
- Eithne Wilkins and Ernst Kaiser
- Sophie Wilkins and Burton Pike

==== Translators of Rainer Maria Rilke ====
- Walter W. Arndt
- Willis Barnstone
- Michael Hamburger
- Stephen Mitchell
- Edward A. Snow

==== Translators of W. G. Sebald ====
- Anthea Bell
- Michael Hamburger

==== Translators of Ludwig Wittgenstein ====
- Elizabeth Anscombe

==== Translators of Stefan Zweig ====
- Anthea Bell

=== Translators of Gikuyu ===
==== Translators of Ngũgĩ wa Thiong'o ====
- Wangui wa Goro

=== Translators of Greenlandic ===
- David R. Slavitt – translated poets Torkilk Mørch, Gerda Hvisterdahl, and Innunquaq Larsen (2012, with Nive Grønkjær)

=== Translators of modern Greek ===
- Willis Barnstone – Margarita Liberaki
- Peter Constantine – Yannis Souliotis
- Rex Warner – On the Greek Style: Selected Essays in Poetry and Hellenism by Giorgos Seferis (1967; co-translation with T. D. Frangopoulous)

=== Translators of Haitian Creole ===
- Peter Constantine – Felix Morrisseau-Leroy

=== Translators of Hebrew ===
- Curt Leviant – Yehudah Yudel Rosenberg
- Stephen Mitchell – Yehuda Amichai, Dan Pagis
- Abraham Regelson – including Ya'akov Cahan, Jakob Klatzkin, and some of his own Hebrew works
- Nina Salaman – Naftali Herz Imber
- Lazarre Seymour Simckes – Shmuel Yosef Agnon, Haim Gouri, Yoram Kaniuk, Nava Semel
- Jean Starr Untermeyer – poetry

=== Translators of Hindi ===
- David Rubin – Susham Bedi, Sumitranandan Pant, Jaishankar Prasad, Premchand, Shrilal Shukla, Suryakant Tripathi, Mahadevi Varma

=== Translators of Hungarian ===
- Michael Henry Heim – György Konrád, István Örkény
- Ralph Manheim – János Székely

==== Translators of Péter Esterházy ====
- Michael Henry Heim

=== Translators of Icelandic ===
- Magnus Magnusson – Halldór Laxness

=== Translators of Irish ===
- Douglas Hyde – folktales and songs

=== Translators of Italian ===
- William Arrowsmith – Eugenio Montale, Cesare Pavese, Mario Tobino
- Keith Botsford – Emilio Gentile, Massimo Piattelli-Palmarini
- Richard Dixon – Franco Buffoni, Roberto Calasso, Eugenio De Signoribus, Marcello Fois, Pope Francis, Carlo Emilio Gadda, Federico Marchetti Stefano Massini, Antonio Moresco, Marco Santagata, Paolo Volponi
- Jonathan Galassi – Eugenio Montale
- Louis J. Gallagher – Cesare Moreschini
- Ann Goldstein – Alessandro Baricco, Giancarlo De Cataldo, Alba de Céspedes, Donatella Di Pietrantonio, Elena Ferrante, Helena Janeczek, Jhumpa Lahiri, Amara Lakhous, Pier Paolo Pasolini, Pia Pera
- Raymond Rosenthal – Aldo Busi, Carlo Cassola, Pietro Citati, Gabriele D'Annunzio, Tommaso Landolfi, Vasco Pratolini, Pietro Redondi, Mario Tobino
- Herman George Scheffauer – Gabriele D'Annunzio
- William Weaver – including Giorgio Bassani, Carlo Emilio Gadda, Elsa Morante, Alberto Moravia
- Shaun Whiteside – Paolo Giordano, Nicola Pugliese, Helga Schneider, Wu Ming
- Beryl de Zoete – Alberto Moravia

==== Translators of Italo Calvino ====
- William Weaver

==== Translators of Umberto Eco ====
- Richard Dixon
- William Weaver

==== Translators of Primo Levi ====
- Ann Goldstein
- Raymond Rosenthal

==== Translators of Luigi Pirandello ====
- William Weaver

==== Translators of Italo Svevo ====
- William Weaver
- Beryl de Zoete

=== Translators of Indonesian ===
- Burton Raffel – Chairil Anwar

=== Translators of Japanese ===
- Nancy Andrew – Ryū Murakami
- Jonathan Chaves – Fukuda Kodojin, Chō Kōran, Yanagawa Seigan
- John Gardner – Kikuo Itaya (with Nobuko Tsukui)
- Howard Hibbett – Yasunari Kawabata, Michio Takeyama, Jun'ichirō Tanizaki
- Donald Keene – Kōbō Abe, Osamu Dazai, Yasunari Kawabata, Yukio Mishima, Makoto Oda, Yūzō Yamamoto
- Hideo Levy – Otohiko Kaga
- Ivan Morris – Masuji Ibuse, Yukio Mishima, Shōhei Ōoka, Jirō Osaragi
- Kenneth Rexroth – poetry including Kazuko Shiraishi
- Donald Richie – film subtitles and screenplays
- Frederik L. Schodt – various manga
- Edward Seidensticker – Yasushi Inoue, Yasunari Kawabata, Yukio Mishima, Kafū Nagai, Jun'ichirō Tanizaki
- Alexander O. Smith – novelists including Keigo Higashino, Miyuki Miyabe; video games including Final Fantasy X, Ace Attorney, Vagrant Story
- Lucien Stryk – Shinkichi Takahashi
- Royall Tyler – Matsutarō Kawaguchi, Shōtarō Yasuoka
- Burton Watson – Daisaku Ikeda, Mori Ōgai, Santōka Taneda

=== Translators of Korean ===
- Don Mee Choi – Ahn Hak-sop, Kim Hyesoon, Yi Sang
- Bruce and Juchan Fulton – including Cheon Unyeong, Cho Se-hui, Han Yujoo, Hwang Sunwon, Kim Ae-Ran, Kim Sagwa, O Jeonghui

=== Translators of Macedonian ===
- Will Firth – Petre M. Andreevski, Dimitar Baševski, Jordan Plevnes, Aleksandar Prokopiev, Dušan Ristevski, Ivan Trposki
- Carolyn Kizer – poetry
- Ewald Osers – Mateja Matevski

=== Translators of Maltese ===
- Arthur John Arberry – Dun Karm Psaila

=== Translators of Montenegrin ===
- Will Firth – Stefan Bošković, Andrej Nikolaidis, Slavica Perović, Ognjen Spahić

=== Translators of Nepali ===
- David Rubin – Laxmi Prasad Devkota
- Abhi Subedi – poetry
- Suman Pokhrel – including Geeta Tripathee

=== Translators of Norwegian ===
- George Benson Johnston – Knut Ødegård

=== Translators of Persian ===
- A. J. Arberry – Muhammad Iqbal
- M. R. Ghanoonparvar – Mohammadreza Bayrami, Bahram Beyzai, Sadeq Chubak, Simin Daneshvar, Houshang Golshiri, Shahrokh Meskoob, Ja'far Modarres-Sadeghi, Moniro Ravanipour, Nima Yooshij
- Rebecca Gould and Kayvan Tahmasebian – Hasan Alizadeh, Bijan Elahi
- Sara Khalili – including Shahriar Mandanipour, Shahrnush Parsipur, Parinoush Saniee, Goli Taraghi
- Reynold A. Nicholson – Muhammad Iqbal
- Niloufar Talebi – including Ahmad Shamlou
- Sholeh Wolpe – including Forugh Farrokhzad

==== Translators of Sadegh Hedayat ====
- Desmond Patrick Costello
- M. R. Ghanoonparvar

=== Translators of Polish ===
- Jerzy Ficowski – Bruno Schulz
- Louis Iribarne – Stanisław Witkiewicz
- Czesław Miłosz – Zbigniew Herbert
- Barbara Wright and Franciszka Themerson – Stefan Themerson
- Jane Zielonko — Czesław Miłosz

==== Translators of Stanisław Lem ====
- Louis Iribarne
- Michael Kandel

==== Translators of Olga Tokarczuk ====
- Jennifer Croft

=== Translators of Portuguese ===
- Margaret Jull Costa – Sophia de Mello Breyner Andresen, Paulo Coelho, Eça de Queirós
- Ruth Fainlight – Sophia de Mello Breyner Andresen
- Daniel Hahn – José Eduardo Agualusa, José Luís Peixoto, Pelé, Gonçalo M. Tavares
- Idra Novey – Manoel de Barros, Paulo Henriques Britto, Clarice Lispector
- David R. Slavitt – Manuel Bandeira
- Arthur Waley – Alberto de Lacerda

==== Translators of Fernando Pessoa ====
- Margaret Jull Costa

==== Translators of José Saramago ====
- Margaret Jull Costa
- Daniel Hahn

=== Translators of Quechua ===
- W. S. Merwin – poetry

=== Translators of Romanian ===
- Michael Henry Heim – Max Blecher

=== Translators of Russian ===
- Peter Constantine – Isaac Babel
- Albert Spaulding Cook – Zinaida Gippius
- Elaine Feinstein – Bella Akhmadulina, Margarita Aliger, Yunna Morits, Marina Tsvetaeva
- Will Firth – Alisa Ganieva
- Mirra Ginsburg – Andrei Platonov
- John Glad – Vasily Aksyonov, Nikolai Klyuev, Varlam Shalamov
- Michael Glenny – Vasily Aksyonov, Anatoly Pristavkin, Georgi Vladimov, Boris Yeltsin
- Max Hayward – Isaac Babel, Yevgenia Ginzburg, Nadezhda Mandelstam, Vladimir Mayakovsky, Andrei Sinyavsky
- Michael Henry Heim – M. Ageyev, Vasily Aksyonov, Korney Chukovsky, Felix Roziner, Sasha Sokolov, Eduard Uspensky
- Max Lawton – Vladimir Sorokin
- Ralph Manheim – Yevgeny Tarle
- W. S. Merwin – Osip Mandelstam
- Alan Myers – including Yury Dombrovsky, Lydia Ginzburg
- Vladimir Nabokov – Fyodor Tyutchev
- Joachim Neugroschel – S. An-sky
- Douglas Robinson – Nina Sadur (with Svetlana Ilinskaya), Yevgeny Yevtushenko
- George Reavey – Nikolai Berdyayev, Yevgeny Yevtushenko
- Lydia Pasternak Slater

==== Translators of Anna Akhmatova ====
- Albert Spaulding Cook
- Max Hayward
- Alan Myers

==== Translators of Joseph Brodsky ====
- Alan Myers

==== Translators of Mikhail Bulgakov ====
- Mirra Ginsburg
- Michael Glenny

==== Translators of Vladimir Nabokov ====
- Michael Glenny

==== Translators of Boris Pasternak ====
- J. M. Cohen
- Max Hayward
- Lydia Pasternak Slater
- George Reavey

==== Translators of Aleksandr Solzhenitsyn ====
- Michael Glenny
- Max Hayward
- Ronald Hingley

==== Translators of Yevgeny Zamyatin ====
- Mirra Ginsburg

=== Translators of Serbian ===
- Will Firth – Miloš Crnjanski, Aleksandar Gatalica, Marija Knežević
- Michael Henry Heim – Miloš Crnjanski, Danilo Kiš, Predrag Matvejević, Aleksandar Tišma
- Dejan Stojanović – writer and translator of Circling: 1978–1987, The Sun Watches the Sun, The Sign and Its Children, The Creator, and The Shape

=== Translators of Slovak ===
- Ewald Osers – Milan Rúfus, Miroslav Válek

=== Translators of Slovenian ===
- Peter Constantine – Brina Svit

=== Translators of Spanish ===
- Esther Allen – including Rosario Castellanos, Antonio di Benedetto, Felisberto Hernández, Javier Marías, José Martí
- Willis Barnstone – Vicente Aleixandre, Miguel Hernández, Antonio Machado, Pedro Salinas
- J. M. Cohen – Heberto Juan Padilla
- Margaret Jull Costa – Javier Marías, César Vallejo
- Lucia Graves – Carlos Ruiz Zafón
- Edith Grossman – including Carlos Fuentes, Mayra Montero, Álvaro Mutis
- Daniel Hahn – Rodrigo Blanco Calderón (with Noel Hernández González), María Dueñas, Eduardo Halfon
- Andrew Hurley – Reinaldo Arenas, Zoé Valdés
- Anne McLean – Julio Cortázar, Enrique Vila-Matas
- W. S. Merwin – Roberto Juarroz, Antonio Porchia, Jaime Sabines
- Margaret Sayers Peden – Carlos Fuentes, Horacio Quiroga, Juan Rulfo
- Gregory Rabassa – Julio Cortázar
- Douglas Robinson – Gloria Fuertes
- John Sturrock – Alejo Carpentier
- Mary Stanley Low – Red Spanish Notebook (parts)
- Natasha Wimmer – Roberto Bolaño
- Frank Wynne – Andrés Caicedo, Javier Cercas, Alonso Cueto, Marcelo Figueras, Tomás González, Almudena Grandes, Tomás Eloy Martínez, Emiliano Monge, Quino, Arturo Pérez-Reverte

==== Translators of Jorge Luis Borges ====
- Esther Allen
- Willis Barnstone
- Norman Thomas di Giovanni
- Andrew Hurley
- Suzanne Jill Levine
- Robert Mezey
- Alastair Reid
- Eliot Weinberger

==== Translators of Gabriel García Márquez ====
- Edith Grossman
- Gregory Rabassa

==== Translators of Federico García Lorca ====
- Willis Barnstone

==== Translators of Gabriela Mistral ====
- Doris Dana – selected poems (1971)
- John Gallas – This Far Place (2023)
- Langston Hughes – selected poems (1957)
- Ursula K. Le Guin – selected poems (2003)

==== Translators of Pablo Neruda ====
- Willis Barnstone
- W. S. Merwin
- Stephen Mitchell
- Margaret Sayers Peden

==== Translators of Mario Vargas Llosa ====
- Edith Grossman

=== Translators of Urdu ===
- Musharraf Ali Farooqi – including Afzal Ahmed Syed
- Alamgir Hashmi
- Victor G. Kiernan
- Carolyn Kizer – poetry

=== Translators of Vietnamese ===
- Burton Raffel – poetry including Ho Chi Minh, Huy Cận

=== Translators of Yiddish ===
- Carolyn Kizer – poetry
- Curt Leviant – Sholom Aleichem, Chaim Grade, Avrom Reyzen, Lamed Shapiro
- Joachim Neugroschel – including Sholem Aleichem, Sholem Asch, David Bergelson, Rachel Korn, Moyshe Kulbak, H. Leivick, Der Nister, I. L. Peretz, Avrom Reyzen, Chava Rosenfarb, Lamed Shapiro, Fradl Shtok
- Abraham Regelson – Aaron Glanz-Leyeles
- Marion Wiesel – Elie Wiesel

==== Translators of Isaac Bashevis Singer ====
- Curt Leviant
- Joachim Neugroschel
