= Kausalya Hart =

Kausalya Hart (Tamil: கௌசல்யா ஹார்ட்) is a scholar of Tamil language at UC Berkeley. She is famous for translating Sangam literature from Tamil to English and for writing many Tamil textbooks.

== Life ==
Kausalya Hart is a scholar of Tamil. She taught in the Department of South Asian Studies at the University of California, Berkeley. She has written many books for students and has translated many works of bhakti literature from the 6th to 15th century CE.

== Work ==
She wrote the book Tamil for Beginners, widely used in universities. She has written several Tamil plays and much other material for teaching Tamil. She has written papers on Tamil literature, including the Tamil Ramayana and aspects of early Christian literature. Her translations include many works of Tamil bhakti literature from the 6th to the 15th centuries and also the Manimekalai and the Kalingattu Parani. Her translations are available on the Project Madurai website.

== See also ==
- List of translators into English
