= C. D. C. Reeve =

American philosopher

Academic background
- Education: Cornell University (PhD)
- Thesis: Mass, Quantity and Amount (1980)

Academic work
- Era: Contemporary philosophy
- Region: Western philosophy
- Institutions: University of North Carolina at Chapel Hill

Charles David C. Reeve (born September 10, 1948) is a philosophy professor at the University of North Carolina at Chapel Hill. He works primarily with ancient Greek philosophy, especially Plato and Aristotle. He has also published work on the philosophy of sex, love, and film. He has translated many texts from Ancient Greek, mostly by Plato and Aristotle.

== List of works ==
=== Books ===
- Philosopher-Kings: The Argument of Plato's Republic. (Princeton 1988; reissued 2006)
- Socrates in the Apology: An Essay On Plato's Apology of Socrates. (Hackett 1989)
- Practices of Reason. (Oxford, 1992)
- Substantial Knowledge. (Hackett 2000)
- Love's Confusions. (Harvard 2005)

=== Translations ===
- Plato's Republic. (1992) [translated by G. M. A. Grube; revised by C. D. C. Reeve]
- Plato's Cratylus. (1997)
- Aristotle's Politics. (1998; revised edition, 2017)
- The Trials of Socrates: Six Classic Texts. (2002) [editor; also translator of Euthyphro, Apology, Crito, and Phaedo 115b1-118a17]
- Plato's Euthyphro, Apology, Crito. (2002)
- Plato's Republic. (2004)
- Plato's Meno. (2006)
- Plato On Love: Lysis, Symposium, Phaedrus, Alcibiades, with Selections from Republic and Laws. (2006) [editor; translated Republic and Laws only]
- A Plato Reader: Eight Essential Dialogues (Euthyphro, Apology, Crito, Meno, Phaedo, Symposium, Phaedrus and Republic). (2012)
- Aristotle's Nicomachean Ethics. (2014)
- Aristotle's Metaphysics. (2016)
- Aristotle's De Anima. (2017)
- Aristotle's Physics. (2018)
- Aristotle's Rhetoric. (2018)
- Aristotle's Generation of Animals with History of Animals I and Parts of Animals I. (2019)
- Aristotle's De Caelo. (2020)
- Aristotle's Eudemian Ethics. (2021)
- Plato's Laws. (2022)

=== Select essays ===
- "Anaxagorean Panspermism" (1981). Ancient Philosophy. 1: 89-108
- "Motion, Rest, and Dialectic in the Sophist" (1985). Archiv für Geschichte der Philosophie. 67: 47-64
- "Socrates Meets Thrasymachus" (1985). Archiv für Geschichte der Philosophie. 67: 246-265
