= John Brooke (translator) =

English translator of religious works

John Brooke (died 1582), was an English translator of religious works. He was the son of John Brooke, a native of Ashnext-Sandwich and owner of Brooke House in that village. Although appointed a scholar at Trinity College, Cambridge by the foundation charter of 1546, he did not become a B.A. until 1553–1554. Brooke married Magdalen Stoddard of Mottingham. He died in 1582, leaving no children, and was buried in the Ash church.

== Works ==
- The Staffe of Christian Faith, Translated out of French into English by John Brooke, of Ashe-next-Sandwiche, 1577.
- John Gardener, his confession of the Christian Faith. Translated out of French by John Brooke, 1578, 1583.
- A Christian Discourse … presented to the Prince of Conde. Translated by J. B., 1578.
- The Christian Disputations by Master Peter Viret, dedicated to Edmund, Abp. of Canterbury. Translated out of French … by J. B. of Ashe, 1579.
- Of Two Wonderful Popish Monsters, to wyt, Of a Popish Asse which was found in Rome in the river Tyber (1496), and of a Moonkish Calfe, calued [sic] at Friberge in Misne (1528). … Witnessed and declared, the one by P. Melancthon, the other by M. Luther. Translated out of French … by John Brooke of Assh. … With two cuts of the Monsters, 1579.
- A Faithful and Familiar Exposition upon the Prayer of our Lorde. … Written in French dialogue wise, by Peter Viret, and translated into English by John Brooke. Dedicated to Syr Roger Manwood, knight, and Lorde Chiefe Baron of the Queene's Maiesties Excheker, 1582.
