= Robert Bagg =

American poet and translator (1935–2026)

Robert Ely Bagg (September 21, 1935 – April 9, 2026) was an American poet and translator. He published several volumes of poetry authored critical studies of Sappho and Catullus. He graduated from Amherst College in 1957, and received an M.A. and PhD from the University of Connecticut in 1961 and 1965, respectively. In 1961, Bagg's collection of poetry titled Madonna of the Cello was a finalist for the Pulitzer Prize for Poetry and National Book Award.

In addition to his other literary work, Bagg taught English at the University of Massachusetts Amherst (1965–1996), and served as Chair of the English Department from 1986 to 1992.

== Background ==
Bagg was born in New Jersey on September 21, 1935, and grew up in Millburn. Bagg graduated with a B.A. from Amherst College in 1957, his father's alma mater. There, he studied under the American poet James Merrill. Bagg went on to attend classes at Harvard University in 1960 before earning a PhD from the University of Connecticut.

Bagg died at his home in Worthington, Massachusetts, on April 9, 2026, at the age of 90.

== Translations ==
- Hippolytus by Euripides (1973)
- The Bakkhai by Euripides (1978)
