= A. Charles Muller =

American academic, Buddhist and translator

A. Charles Muller (born September 19, 1953) is a Japan-based academic specializing in Korean Buddhism and East Asian Yogacara, having published numerous books and articles on these topics. He was one of the earliest developers of online research resources for the field of Buddhist Studies and the founder and managing editor of the Digital Dictionary of Buddhism, the CJKV-English Dictionary, and the H-Buddhism Scholars Information Network, along with having digitized and published numerous reference works.

== Early life and education ==
Muller was raised in Yaphank, New York. He was the youngest of three children. He became interested in East Asia when he began taking karate classes in high school after being bullied.

Muller first took college classes at the University of Dayton in 1971, on a pre-med path. However, he later dropped out. In 1980 he returned to college at Suffolk County Community College, where he studied for a year before transferring to Stony Brook University. Muller's academic study of Buddhism began at Stony Brook, where he majored in Religious Studies under the guidance of Sung Bae Park, a specialist in Seon and Korean Buddhism.

After graduating, he spent two years studying in Japan, after which he spent one year in the graduate program in Religious Studies at the University of Virginia. In 1988, he left UVA to return to Stony Brook, where he completed a PhD in Comparative literature, once again with Sung Bae Park as his principal advisor. He also studied Christian Theology with Peter Manchester, Islam with William Chittick, and postmodern literary criticism with Michael Sprinker and Hugh Silverman. His dissertation, "Hamhŏ Kihwa: A Study of His Major Works," was accepted in 1993, after which he spent six months in Korea as a research associate at the Academy of Korean Studies, before taking up an academic position in Japan, at Toyo Gakuen University.

== Career ==
From 1994 to 2008, Muller taught courses in philosophy and religion at Toyo Gakuen University, during which time he published books and articles on Korean Buddhism, Zen, East Asian Yogacara, and Confucianism. While active in numerous academic organizations such as the American Academy of Religion and the Japanese Association for Indian and Buddhist Studies, he also created online research resources. In 1995, he set up a website called Resources for East Asian Language and Thought, which features online lexicons, indexes, bibliographies, and translations of classical texts. In 1997, he started the Budschol listserv for the academic study of Buddhism, which would, in 2000, become part of H-Net, under the name of H-Buddhism.

He also initiated two major dictionary projects, the Digital Dictionary of Buddhism and the CJKV-E Dictionary. His work in the area of online reference works and digitization led him into the field of Digital Humanities, with his principal area of expertise lying in the handling of literary documents using XML and XSLT. In 2008, Muller was invited to join the Faculty of Humanities at the University of Tokyo, where he taught courses in Digital Humanities, Chinese Philosophy, and Korean Philosophy and Religion.

He retired from UTokyo in March 2019 and moved to Musashino University, where he is director of the Institute of Buddhist culture and teaches courses in Buddhist Studies.

== Selected works ==
- Korea's Great Buddhist-Confucian Debate: The Treatises of Chŏng Tojŏn (Sambong) and Hamhŏ Tŭkt’ong (Kihwa), 2015.
- A Korean-English Dictionary of Buddhist Terms, 2014.
- Wŏnhyo's Philosophy of Mind, 2011.
- The Collected Works of Korean Buddhism: Volume I: 元堯 Wonhyo: Selected Works, 2012.
- The Sutra of Perfect Enlightenment: Korean Buddhism's Guide to Meditation, 1999.
- Digital Dictionary of Buddhism
- CJKV-English Dictionary
