= James Yonge (translator) =

Anglo-Irish translator, author, and civil servant

James or Jacobus Yonge (fl. 1406–1438) was an Anglo-Irish translator, author, and civil servant.

== Life ==
Yonge lived in Dublin and belonged to an English family settled in the Irish pale. William Yonge, Archdeacon of Meath from 1407 to 1437, was possibly his brother. Both James and John Yonge (possibly an uncle) occur in the Irish patent and close rolls early in the fifteenth century. James Yonge was in prison in Trim Castle from January to October 1423, being removed in the latter month to Dublin Castle, and being pardoned on 10 May 1425. A John Yonge was serjeant of the county of Limerick in the reign of Richard II, held a lease of various lands, and was convicted of unspecified felonies.

James Yonge worked as a legal scribe for the City of Dublin, the religious Guild of St. Anne, St. John's Parish, and many private clients in Dublin. In 1412, he wrote a Latin text known as the 'Memoriale' chronicling the visions of a Hungarian knight, Laurence Rathold of Pászthó, in Saint Patrick's Purgatory. He was hired by James Butler, 4th earl of Ormonde, to translate into English the ‘Secreta Secretorum’ attributed to Aristotle. He finished this work in 1422. The 'Secreta secretorum' was a popular work in the Middle Ages, and translations were made in the early fifteenth century by Thomas Hoccleve, John Shirley (1366?–1456), John Lydgate, and Burgh, and John Gower used it in his Confessio Amantis. Yonge's translation appears to have been made from a French version by one Gofroi of Waterford; it was dedicated to Ormonde and was once considered ‘perhaps the only lengthy work known written in the English of the Pale early in the fifteenth century’. It is divided into seventy-two chapters and is interspersed with passages from Irish history, including some of Ormonde's exploits in 1422. Several manuscripts of it are extant.
