= E. F. Watling =

English classicist and translator (1899–1990)

Edward Fairchild Watling (8 October 1899 – 6 September 1990) was an English schoolmaster, classicist and translator. He produced translations for Penguin Classics of Sophocles's three Theban plays, nine plays of Plautus and a selection of Seneca's tragedies.

The son of a Denbighshire dairy farmer, Watling was educated at Christ's Hospital and University College, Oxford. He took a Second in Classical Moderations in 1920 and a Third in Literae Humaniores ('"Greats") in 1922.

Watling taught Classics at King Edward VII School in Sheffield from 1924 until his retirement in 1960. He contributed to amateur dramatics in Sheffield, both as an actor and as a producer, initially for the Sheffield Playgoers and later in Geoffrey Ost's productions at the Sheffield Playhouse. He also wrote sketches for the West End revues of André Charlot, and was a regular reviewer of both books and stage productions for the Sheffield Telegraph. As "Marcus" he compiled crosswords for The Listener until he was in his seventies.

In 1928 Watling married Cicely Porter (died 1982; one daughter). He died on 6 September 1990.

== Works ==
- Sophocles, The Theban Plays, London: Penguin, 1947. (Translations of Oedipus, Oedipus at Colonus, and Antigone)
- Sophocles, Electra and Other Plays, London: Penguin, 1953 (Translations of Ajax, Electra, Women of Trachis, and Philoctetes)
- Plautus, The Rope and Other Plays, London: Penguin, 1964 (Translations of Rudens (The Rope), Amphitruo (Amphitryo), Mostellaria (The Ghost), and Trinummus (A Three-Dollar Day))
- Plautus, The Pot of Gold and Other Plays, London: Penguin, 1965 (Translations of Aulularia (The Pot of Gold), Captivi (The Prisoners), Menaechmi (The Brothers Menaechmus), Miles Gloriosus (The Swaggering Soldier), and Pseudolus)
- Seneca, Four Tragedies and Octavia, London: Penguin, 1966 (Translations of Thyestes, Phaedra, Troades (The Trojan Women), Oedipus, and Octavia)
