= Thomas Francklin =

British academic and writer (1721–1784)

Thomas Francklin (1721 – 15 March 1784) was an English academic, clergyman, writer and dramatist

== Life ==
Francklin was the son of Richard Francklin, bookseller near the Piazza in Covent Garden, London, who printed William Pulteney's paper The Craftsman. Francklin was admitted to Westminster School in 1735. On the advice of Pulteney he was educated for the church: but Pulteney gave him no subsequent help in life. In 1739 he went to Trinity College, Cambridge, where he was admitted on 21 June 1739, and took the degrees of B.A. in 1742, M.A. 1746, and D.D. in 1770. In 1745 he was elected to a minor fellowship, was promoted in the next year to be "socius major", and resided in college until the end of 1758.

He was for some time an usher in his old school, and then on 27 June 1750 was elected as Regius Professor of Greek at Cambridge. Later in the same year he was involved in a dispute with the heads of the university. Forty-six old boys of Westminster met between eight and nine o'clock on 17 November at the Tuns Tavern to commemorate, as was their custom, the accession of Queen Elizabeth, and Francklin was in the chair. The party was about to separate at eleven o'clock, when the senior proctor appeared and called on them to disperse: hot words ensued. Several pamphlets were published, and among them was one from Francklin entitled An Authentic Narrative of the late Extraordinary Proceedings at Cambridge against the W … r Club, 1751.

He resigned his professorship in 1759, and that year was instituted, on the presentation of his college, to the vicarage of Ware, Hertfordshire, which he held in conjunction with the lectureship of St Paul's, Covent Garden, and a proprietary chapel in Queen Street, London. He was appointed king's chaplain in November 1767, and was selected to preach the commencement sermon at St. Mary's, Cambridge, on the installation of Augustus FitzRoy, 3rd Duke of Grafton, as chancellor of the university in 1770. Through the favour of Archbishop Frederick Cornwallis he was appointed in 1777 to the rectory of Brasted in Kent, and vacated the living of Ware.

Francklin died in Great Queen Street, London, on 15 March 1784. He married, on 20 January 1759, Miss Venables, the daughter of a wine merchant; she died in Great Queen Street on 24 May 1796.

== Work ==
For most of his life Francklin wrote for the press and for the stage. Two of his plays were successful through good acting. He brought out in 1757 a periodical paper of his own composition entitled The Centinel, and he was one of the contributors to Tobias Smollett's Critical Review. Samuel Johnson and Sir Joshua Reynolds were among his friends, and through their influence he became chaplain to the Royal Academy on its foundation, and on Oliver Goldsmith's death in 1774 succeeded to the professorship of ancient history.

With other literary men he was unpopular. One of his victims in the Critical Review was Arthur Murphy, who solaced his feelings of indignation in "A Poetical Epistle to Samuel Johnson, A.M." Charles Churchill, in the Rosciad, sneeringly says that 'he sicken'd at all triumphs but his own.'

Francklin's most solid works consisted of translations and tragedies. His first was an anonymous rendering of Cicero's treatise, Of the Nature of the Gods; it appeared in 1741, was reissued in 1775, and, after revision by Charles Duke Yonge, formed a part of one of the volumes in Bohn's Classical Library. In 1749 he published a translation of the letters of Phalaris, The Epistles of Phalaris translated from the Greek; to which are added some select epistles of the most eminent Greek writers. His translation of the tragedies of Sophocles was long considered the best in the English language. It came out in 1759, and was reprinted in 1809 and 1832; large selections from it were included in Ezekiel Sanford's British Poets, vol. l., and it was included in Henry Morley's Universal Library (vol. xliv.), while a separate impression of the Œdipus Tyrannus was made in 1806.

His version of The Works of Lucian from the Greek, which was produced in 1780 in two volumes, and appeared in a second edition in 1781. The whole work was dedicated to Richard Rigby, and parts were inscribed to other eminent men. His translation of Lucian's Trips to the Moon formed vol. LXXI of Cassell's National Library, edited by Henry Morley.

Francklin's plays are:

- The Earl of Warwick, which was produced at Drury Lane Theatre on 13 December 1766, and was often represented. On its first appearance Mary Ann Yates created a great impression in the part of Margaret of Anjou, and Sarah Siddons in later years made that character equally successful. The whole play, which is said to have been taken without acknowledgement from the French of Jean-François de La Harpe, was printed in 1766 and 1767, and was included in the collections of Bell, Elizabeth Inchbald, Dibdin, and many others.
- Matilda, first presented at Drury Lane on 21 January 1775, was also profitable to the author. It appeared in print in 1775, and was also included in theatrical collections.
- The Contract, brought out at the Haymarket on 12 June 1776, and printed in the same year, was a failure. The chief characters were two persons who had made a contract of marriage, parted, and on meeting again after many years, wished the engagement broken off.
- Mary Queen of Scots, which was several times announced but was never acted, and remained in manuscript until 1837, when it was edited by the author's eldest son, Lieutenant-colonel William Francklin.

Francklin's other literary productions were numerous. Their titles were:

- 'Translation,' a poem, 1753, which condemned many previous attempts at translation, and appealed to abler men to undertake the task, ending with the preliminary puff of his proposal to print by subscription a version of Sophocles.
- 'Enquiry into the Astronomy and Anatomy of the Ancients,' 1749, and said to have been reprinted in 1775.
- 'Truth and Falsehood, a Tale,' 1755, issued anonymously, and panegyrising the then Duchess of Bedford.
- 'The Centinel,' 1757 fol., 1758 12mo, a periodical paper, one of the imitations of the 'Tatler' and 'Spectator.'
- 'A Dissertation on Ancient Tragedy,' 1760, given gratis to the subscribers to his translation of Sophocles.
- 'A Letter to a Bishop concerning Lectureships,' humour on the manner of election to such posts, and the miserable pay attaching thereto.

Between 1748 and 1779 Francklin printed nine single sermons preached on special occasions, including that delivered at St George's, Bloomsbury, in May 1756, on the death of the Rev. John Sturges, from which it seems that he had hoped to succeed him. A volume of his sermons on The Relative Duties was published in 1765, and passed to a fourth edition in 1788.

He died without leaving much provision for his family, and in 1785 there appeared for his widow's benefit two volumes of Sermons on Various Subjects, followed by a third in 1787. Francklin lent his name, in conjunction with Smollett, to a translation of Voltaire's works and letters, but the Orestes (produced at Covent Garden Theatre 13 March 1769 for the benefit of Mrs. Yates) and the Electra (brought out at Drury Lane 15 October 1774) are believed to have been his sole share in the publication.

Some of his fugitive pieces were embodied in the Miscellaneous Pieces brought together by Tom Davies, and there are many of his letters in the Garrick Correspondence.
