= Robert Fills =

English-French translator

Robert Fills (fl. 1562), was an English-French translator who translated works from French into English.

== Works ==
- 1562 - Fills published The Lawes and Statutes of Geneva, as well concerning Ecclesiastical Discipline as Civill Regiment, with certeine Proclamations duly executed, whereby God's religion is most purely mainteined, and their commonwealth quietli governed.
- 1563 - According to Herbert, Fills published A Briefe and Piththie Summe of the Christian Faith, made in forme of a Confession, with a confutation of all such superstitious errours as are contrary thereunto. Made by Theodore de Beza. Translated out of Frenche by R. F.. Several editions of this work were printed.
- 1568 - According to Tanner and Maunsell, Fills published Godly Prayers and Meditations paraphrasticallye made upon all the Psalmes very necessary for al the godly, translated out of Frenche into Englishe. The book was published again in 1577, and a third time in 1590 with the title, taken from the dedication, of The Anatomie of the Soule.
- Undated - An undated translation entitled Meditations of True and Perfect Consolation, declared in two tables: in the first is seven considerations of the evills which happen unto us; in the second seven considerations of the good we receive. Translated out of French by Rob. Fills exists.

== Dedications ==
"The Lawes and Statutes of Geneva, as well concerning Ecclesiastical Discipline as Civill Regiment, with certeine Proclamations duly executed, whereby God's religion is most purely mainteined, and their commonwealth quietli governed" This volume contains a dedication to "Lord Robert Duddley", in which Fills explains that he wrote this work to prove wrong those who say "against men of our profession" that "we departed oute of this realme in the late tyme of banishement of Goddes churche onelye to this ende, to enjoye more unchastised freedome of sensuall lyfe".

"A Briefe and Piththie Summe of the Christian Faith, made in forme of a Confession, with a confutation of all such superstitious errours as are contrary thereunto. Made by Theodore de Beza. Translated out of Frenche by R. F." In this translated work, Fills inserted a long dedication to Lord Hastings. In this dedication, Fills speaks of himself as "knowing the author [Beza], and being somewhat acquainted with him", and makes a fierce attack upon the secular pursuits of the English clergy, complaining of the "myngle mangle of spirituall and temporall regiment", and asserting that many cathedral churches are "a very refuge and denne of ydell, ignoraunt, and unpreaching lubbers."
