= R. Catesby Taliaferro =

American historian (1907–1989)

Robert Catesby Taliaferro (1907–1989) was an American mathematician, science historian, classical philologist, philosopher, and translator of ancient Greek and Latin works into English. An Episcopalian from an old Virginia family, he taught in the mathematics department of the University of Notre Dame. He is cited as R. Catesby Taliaferro or R. C. Taliaferro.

He translated from Greek and Latin into English: Ptolemy's Almagest, a 2nd-century book on astronomy, the 13 books of Euclid's Elements, Apollonius' works on conic sections, and some works of Plato (Timaios, Critias), and St. Augustine (On Music). He contributed a celebrated foreword to the Bollingen Series 1944 reprint of the Thomas Taylor translation of Plato's Timaeus and Critias. He also wrote a book titled The concept of matter in Descartes and Leibniz and one titled Number systems, introduction to Euclid book V, and to the theory of limits.

He received his doctorate from the University of Virginia at Charlottesville in 1936. He was a teacher at St. John's College in Annapolis, and in 1948 became a master at Portsmouth Priory, now Portsmouth Abbey School, in Portsmouth (Rhode Island). In 1956, he became an associate professor at the University of Notre Dame, after he was their visiting associate professor.

== Bibliography ==
- Rational Mechanics: The Classic Notre Dame Course (Dover Books on Physics) (2014) by R. Catesby Taliaferro and A. Hahn
- Conics Books I-IV (2013) by Apollonius of Perga and R. Catesby Taliaferro
- Euclid: Elements / Archimedes: Works / Apollonius: Conic Sections / Nicomachus: Arithmetic (Great Books, Encyclopædia Britannica, 1952)
- Ptolemy, Copernicus, Kepler (Britannica Great Books 1952) edited by Taliaferro, Translated by Taliaferro and Charles Glenn Wallis
