= Walter W. Arndt =

American scholar

Walter Werner Arndt (May 4, 1916–February 15, 2011) was a world-renowned scholar and translator of Russian, German and Polish. At the time of his death, he was the Sherman Fairchild Professor of Humanities, Emeritus, of Russian Language and Literature at Dartmouth College. With degrees in business administration from Warsaw University, in political science and economics from Oxford University (Oriel College), a master's degree in engineering from Robert College (Istanbul), and a PhD in comparative literature from UNC, Chapel Hill, Arndt was well known for his metric translations, which included versions of Goethe's Faust, Aleksandr Pushkin's Eugene Onegin, a number of poems by Rainer Maria Rilke, as well as works by Busch, Morgenstern, and others. His translation of Eugene Onegin won the Bollingen Poetry Translation Prize in 1962.

== Life ==
Arndt was born to German parents in Istanbul, Ottoman Empire, in 1916. He had 12 years of classical schooling at Breslau, Silesia. In 1934 he moved to Oxford and studied Economics and Political science. After Oxford, Arndt moved to Warsaw, Poland for graduate study, where he learned Polish and, later, Russian. In 1939, after Hitler's invasion of Poland, he joined the anti-Nazi forces, was captured by the Germans and, after escaping from a German POW camp, spent a year in the Polish underground, eventually making his way back to Istanbul. From 1942 to 1945, Arndt was active in intelligence work on behalf of allied forces. He worked for the Office of Strategic Services, and the Office of War Information where he forged Nazi documents and passes until the end of the war. It was in Istanbul that he met and married Miriam Bach and had 2 sons (Robert and David) while teaching and studying at Robert College where he received a degree in mechanical engineering.

He worked in U.N. refugee resettlement between 1944 and 1949 until he was able to arrange emigration to the United States with his family. They lived in Tennessee, then North Carolina where their 2 daughters were born (Prudence and Corinne). In 1956 he received his doctorate in comparative linguistics and classics from UNC. He taught classics and modern languages at Guilford College and then the University of North Carolina, Chapel Hill. In 1963 he was awarded Yale University's Bollingen Prize for Translation, in recognition of his translation of Aleksandr Pushkin's "Eugene Onegin." In 1966 he accepted the chair of the Russian department at Dartmouth College in Hanover, New Hampshire. Semi-retired since 1986, he continued to write well into his 93rd year. His final published work, an elaboration of his earlier version of his memoirs published as "A Picaro in Hitler's Europe," was completed in 2003.

Arndt, 94, died on February 15, 2011. He was survived by his wife, his 4 children, 8 grandchildren, and 5 (and 1 in utero) great-grandchildren.

Arndt was an accomplished polyglot, possessing near-native fluency in Russian, English and Polish in addition to his native German. He was also known to have a command of Latin, Greek, French and Czech.

== Works ==
- Songs of Love and Grief by Heinrich Heine:, Walter W. Arndt (Translator), November 1995, ISBN 978-0-8101-1324-4
- Collected Narrative and Lyrical Poetry, Aleksandr Sergeevich Pushkin (Author), Walter W. Arndt (Translator), Ardis Publishing (31 Dec 1981), ISBN 978-0-88233-826-2
- The Best of Rilke: 72 Form-True Verse Translations with Facing Originals, Commentary and Compact Biography, Walter Arndt (Translator), ISBN 0-87451-460-6
