= Stephen Batman =

English translator and author

Stephen or Stephan Batman or Bateman (died 1584) was an English translator and author.

== Life ==
Batman was born at Bruton, Somerset, and, after a preliminary education in the school of his native town, went to Cambridge, where he had the reputation of being a learned man and an excellent preacher. It is supposed he was the Bateman who in 1534 took the degree of LL.B., being at that time a priest and a student of six years' standing. Afterwards Archbishop Matthew Parker selected him as one of his domestic chaplains, and employed him in the collection of the library now deposited in Corpus Christi College, Cambridge. Batman asserts that he collected 6,700 books for the archbishop, though this is probably an exaggeration. In 1573 he was rector of Merstham, Surrey. He was also Doctor of Divinity and parson of Newington Butts in the same county. In 1582 he was one of the domestic chaplains of Henry Carey, Lord Hunsdon. He resided for some time at Leeds, Kent. His death occurred in 1584.

== Publications ==
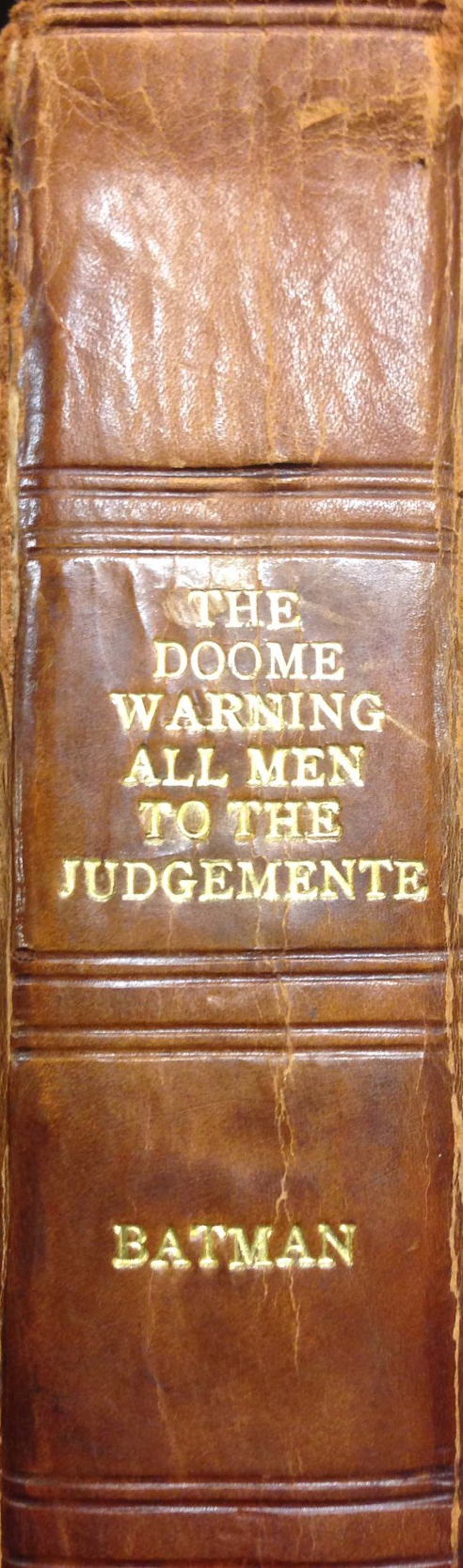
Spine from The Doome warning all men to the Judgemente, 1581

- Christiall Glass for Christian Reformation, treating on the 7 deadly Sinns (London 1569).
- Travayled Pilgreme, bringing Newes from all Parts of the Worlde, such like scarce harde before (London 1569).
- Joyfull Newes out of Helvetia, from Theophr. Paracelsum, declaring the ruinate fall of the papal dignitie: also a treatise against Usury (London 1575).
- The golden booke of the leaden goddes, wherein is described the vayne imaginations of heathen Pagans and counterfaict Christians: wyth a description of their several Tables, what ech of their pictures signified (London 1577).
- Preface to John Rogers' Displaying of an horrible Secte of grosse and wicked Heretiques naming themselves the Family of Love (1579).
- The Doome warning all men to the Judgement: Wherein are contayned for the most parte all the straunge Prodigies hapned in the Worlde, with divers secrete figures of Revelations tending to mannes stayed conversion towardes God: In maner of a generall Chronicle, gathered out of sundrie approved authors (London 1581).
- Batman uppon Bartholome, His Booke De Proprietatibus Rerum; newly corrected, enlarged, & amended, with such Additions as are requisite, unto every severall Booke. Taken foorth of the most approved Authors, the like heretofore not translated in English. Profitable for all Estates, as well for the benefite of the Mind as the Bodie (London 1582).
- Notes upon Richard Robinson's 'Auncient Order, Societie, and Unitie Laudable, of Prince Arthure and his knightly Armory of the Round Table (1583).
- The new arrival of the three Gracis into Anglia, lamenting the abusis of this present age (London).
