= Ian Scott-Kilvert =

British editor and translator (1917–1989)

Ian Stanley Scott-Kilvert OBE (26 May 1917 – 8 October 1989) was a British editor and translator. He worked for the British Council, editing a series of pamphlet essays on British writers, and was chairman of the Byron Society. Amongst his translations were several classical texts, including Plutarch and Polybius, for the Penguin Classics series.

== Life ==
Born in Hampstead, Ian Scott-Kilvert was educated at Harrow School, for whom he played cricket, and Caius College, Cambridge, where he gained a first in English literature. At the start of World War II he was a pacifist, serving in the western desert for the Friends' Ambulance Service. In 1941 he married Elisabeth Dewart. He later joined the army: parachuted into Epirus as a SOE officer in 1944, he successfully took control of his district for the Allies as the Germans retreated.

In 1946 he joined the British Council, and from 1962 to 1967 was director of its publications and recorded sound department. In 1966 he and his wife divorced. He was on the council and committee of the Anglo-Hellenic League and joint chairman of both the British and the international Byron Society.

Scott-Kilvert was general editor of 'Writers and their Work', which began shortly after the war as a "bibliographic series of supplements to British Book News", published for the British Council and the National Book League. The series eventually included hundreds of items, and Scott Kilvert himself contributed treatments of A. E. Housman and John Webster.

He was appointed OBE in the 1978 New Year Honours.

== Works ==
- 'Introduction', Zorba the Greek by Nikos Kazantzakis. Translated by Carl Wildman, 1952.
- A. E. Housman, London: Longmans, Green & Co. for the British Council and the National Book League, 1955. Writers and their work, no. 69.
- (tr.) The age of Alexander: nine Greek lives by Plutarch. Penguin, 1960.
- John Webster, London: Longmans, Green, 1964. Writers and their work, no. 175.
- (tr.) Makers of Rome: Nine Lives by Plutarch. Penguin, 1965.
- (tr.) The Rise of the Roman Empire by Polybius. Penguin, 1979.
- (tr.) The Roman history: the reign of Augustus by Cassius Dio. Penguin, 1987.
