= Peter Ashton (translator) =

English translator

Peter Ashton (fl. 1546), was a translator.

Ashton translated into English, in 1546, the Turcicarum rerum Commentarius of Paulus Jovius, under the title of A Shorte Treatise upon the Turkes Chronicles, compyled by Paulus Jovius, byshop of Nucenie, and dedicated to Charles V, Emperour. Drawen out of the Italyen tong in to Latyne by Franciscus Niger Bassianates. And translated out of Latyne into Englysh by Peter Ashton.

In the dedicatory epistle to Sir Rafe Sadler the translator informs us that he has "studyed rather to use the most playn and famylier English speche the ether Chaucers wordes (which by reason of antiquitie be almost out of use) or els inkhorn termes (as they call them) which the common people for lacke of Latin do not understand."

== Sources ==
"Ashton, Peter" . Dictionary of National Biography. London: Smith, Elder & Co. 1885–1900.
