= Abraham Regelson =

Israeli Hebrew writer (1896–1981)

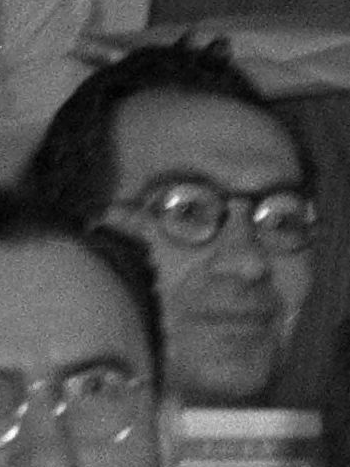
Regelson in 1943

Abraham Regelson (Hebrew: אברהם רגלסון; 1896–1981) was an Israeli Hebrew poet, author, children's author, translator, and editor.

== Biography ==
Abraham Regelson was born in Hlusk, now Belarus, in the Russian Empire in 1896, and died at his home in Neveh Monossohn, Israel in 1981. His parents were Yehuda Zeev Regelson and Rashel Ozick. He is the maternal uncle of Cynthia Ozick.

Regelson emigrated with his family to the United States when he was nine years old. He studied at a Cheder and public schools. He never finished formal studies but was an autodidact who spent many hours in libraries.

== Literary and journalism career ==
At first, he earned his livelihood as a librarian and Hebrew teacher, and began publishing his poetry, stories and translations in various Hebrew publications, both in America and in what was then Palestine. In 1933, he immigrated to Eretz Israel with his family.

Employed by the daily newspaper Davar, he helped Yitzhak Yatziv found the children's weekly supplement Davar l'Yladim, where "Masa HaBubot l'Eretz-Yisrael" ("The Dolls' Journey to Eretz Israel") was first published in installments in 1934. Three years later, after his infant son Yedidya died of dysentery, and with his son Yochai critically ill with malaria, he returned to the US with his family. There he earned his living mostly as a freelance translator and writer for the Yiddish press, while publishing several books containing his Hebrew poetry, legends and philosophical essays. During this time, he wrote for the Yiddish daily Morgen Freiheit and taught at the Jefferson School of Social Science, both affiliated with the Communist Party USA.

He returned to Israel in 1949, where he worked as an editor for the publishing house Am Oved. He was also on the staff of the daily newspaper Al Ha-Mishmar, where he featured as a regular columnist.

Regelson's language combined old and new and his innovative usages contributed to the rejuvenation of the Hebrew tongue. The influence of English literature added flavor to his work. He was also a translator and enriched Hebrew with many classics of English literature.

== Awards and recognition ==
- In 1964, Regelson was awarded the Brenner Prize.
- In 1972, he was awarded the Bialik Prize for literature.
- In 1976, he won the Neuman Prize from New York University's (NYU) Hebrew Department for his contribution to Hebrew literature.

== See also ==
- List of Hebrew language authors
- List of Bialik Prize recipients
