= J. M. Cohen =

British translator and author

J. M. (John Michael) Cohen (5 February 1903 – 19 July 1989) was a prolific British translator of European literature into English.

== Life ==
Born in London, J. M. Cohen was educated at St. Paul's School, London and Queens' College at Cambridge University. After working in his father's manufacturing business from 1925 until 1940, he was moved by a wartime shortage of teachers to become a schoolmaster. In addition to teaching young people, he spent the war years teaching himself Spanish and Russian, and he launched his translation career with the first English translation of poems by Boris Pasternak, then unknown outside the Soviet Union. His translation of Pasternak garnered praise from American poet John Ashbery, in his book Other Traditions.

In 1946, on the strength of a commission from Penguin Books for a major translation of Don Quixote, Cohen quit his teaching job to dedicate himself full-time to writing and translation. His workmanlike and accurate translation of Don Quixote, published in 1950, has been highly praised, and remained in print until 2000. However, some critics have compared it unfavourably to the translation by Samuel Putnam on the basis of Cohen being "too faithful to the original."

In addition to his translations of major works of Spanish and French literature for Penguin, Cohen also edited several important anthologies of Spanish and Latin American literature, as well as many of the Penguin Classics (alongside E. V. Rieu). He played an instrumental role in the Latin Boom of the 1960s by translating works by Jorge Luis Borges, Octavio Paz, and Carlos Fuentes, and by bringing the works of Gabriel García Márquez to the attention of his future English publisher. He also wrote a number of works of literary criticism and biography.

In its obituary, The Times described him as "the translator of foreign prose classics for our times." The Guardian declared that he "did perhaps more than anyone else in his generation to introduce British readers to the classics of world literature by making them available in good modern English translations."

== Selected translations by Cohen ==
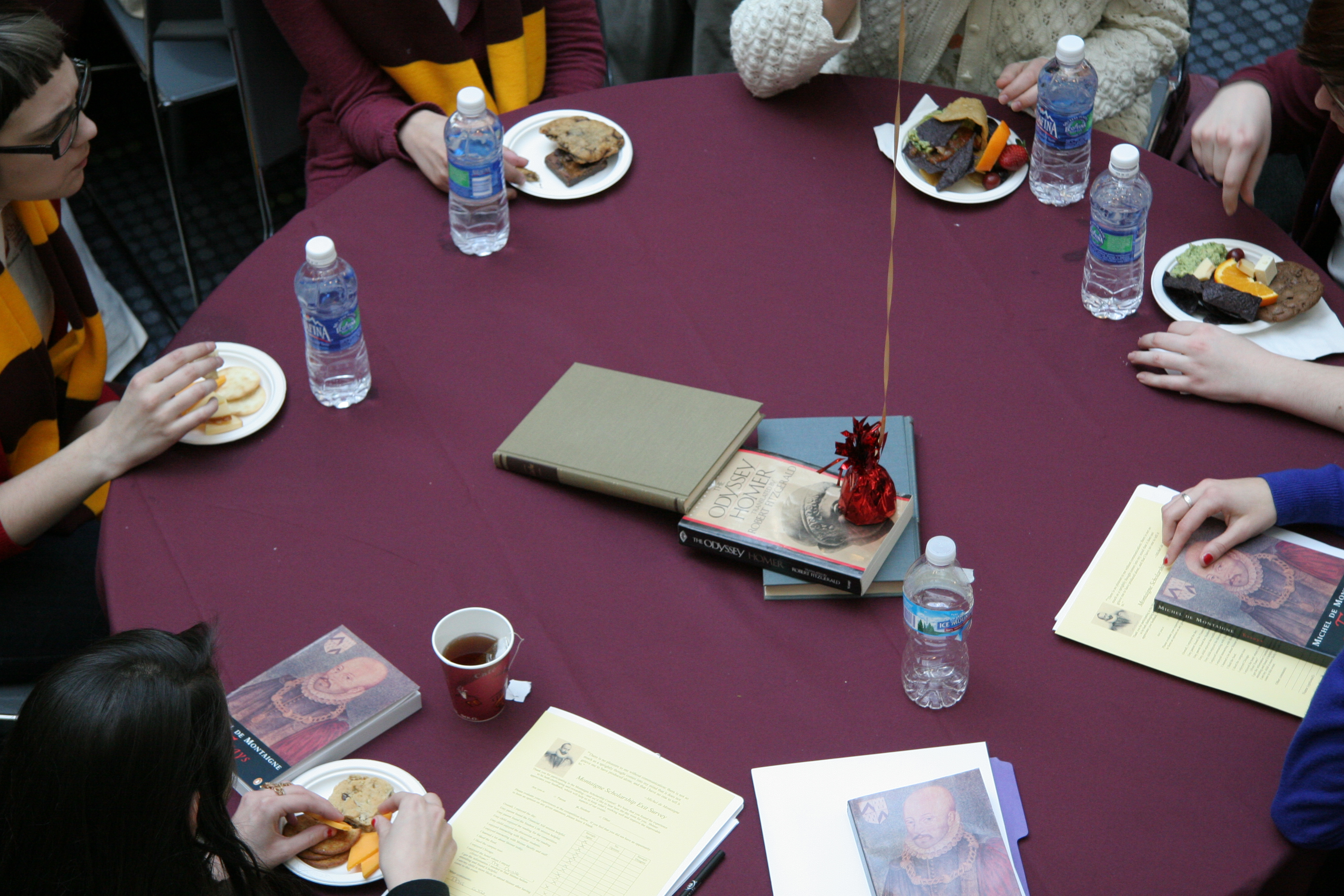
Copies of Cohen's translation of Montaigne's Essays at a Shimer College discussion.

- Boris Pasternak, Selected Poems, London: Drummond, 1946.
- Miguel de Cervantes, Don Quixote, Penguin, 1950.
- Jean-Jacques Rousseau, The Confessions, Penguin, 1953.
- François Rabelais, The Histories of Gargantua and Pantagruel, Penguin, 1955.
- St. Teresa of Avila, The Life of St. Teresa of Avila by Herself, Penguin, 1957.
- Michel de Montaigne, Essays, Penguin, 1958.
- Bernal Díaz, The Conquest of New Spain, Penguin, 1963.
- Fernando de Rojas, La Celestina or The Spanish Bawd: Being the Tragi-Comedy of Calisto and Melibea, Penguin, 1964.
- Pierre Teilhard de Chardin, The Appearance of Man, London: Collins, 1965.
- Agustin de Zárate, The Discovery and Conquest of Peru, Penguin, 1968.
- Christopher Columbus, The Four Voyages of Christopher Columbus; Being His Own Log-book, Letters and Dispatches with Connecting Narrative Drawn from the Life of the Admiral by His Son Hernando Colon and Other Contemporary Historians, Penguin, 1969.
- Heberto Padilla, Sent off the Field: A Selection from the Poetry of Heberto Padilla, London: Deutsch, 1972.

== Books and anthologies edited by Cohen ==
- The Penguin Book of Comic and Curious Verse, Penguin, 1952.
- Penguin Book of Spanish Verse, Penguin, 1956 (new editions, 1962 and 1988).
- More Comic and Curious Verse, Penguin, 1956.
- Yet More Comic and Curious Verse, Penguin, 1959.
- (with Mark J. Cohen) The Penguin Dictionary of Quotations, Penguin, 1960.
- Poetry of This Age: 1908–1965, Harper, 1966.
- Latin American Writing Today, Penguin, 1967.
- Writers in the New Cuba: An Anthology, Penguin, 1967.
- (with Mark J. Cohen), The Penguin Dictionary of Modern Quotations, Penguin, 1971.
- (with Mark J. Cohen) The New Penguin Dictionary of Quotations, Viking, 1992.
- The Common Experience, an anthology of mystical writing
- The Rider Book of Mystical Verse, Rider & Co, 1983.

== Books written by Cohen ==
- Robert Browning, London: Longmans, Green, 1952.
- A History of Western Literature, Penguin, 1956.
- The Life of Ludwig Mond, London: Methuen & Co., 1956.
- Poetry of This Age (1959, revised 1966)
- Robert Graves, Edinburgh: Oliver and Boyd, 1960.
- English Translators and Translations, London: Longmans, Green, 1962.
- The Baroque Lyric, London: Hutchinson, 1963.
- Jorge Luis Borges, New York: Barnes & Noble, 1973.
- Journeys down the Amazon: Being the Extraordinary Adventures and Achievements of the Early Explorers, London: C. Knight, 1975.

== Works cited ==
- McGrath, Michael J. (2009). "The Modern Translations of Don Quixote in Britain". In Ardila, J.A.G. (ed.). The Cervantean Heritage: Reception and Influence of Cervantes in Britain. Legenda. pp. 76–83. ISBN 9781906540036. OCLC 300288430.
