= Edward Dundas Butler =

- Born: 15 October 1842; Chelsea
- Died: 11 February 1919 (aged 76); Islington
- Resting place: Highgate Cemetery

Edward Dundas Butler was a linguist, translator and senior librarian at the Department of Printed Books, British Museum.

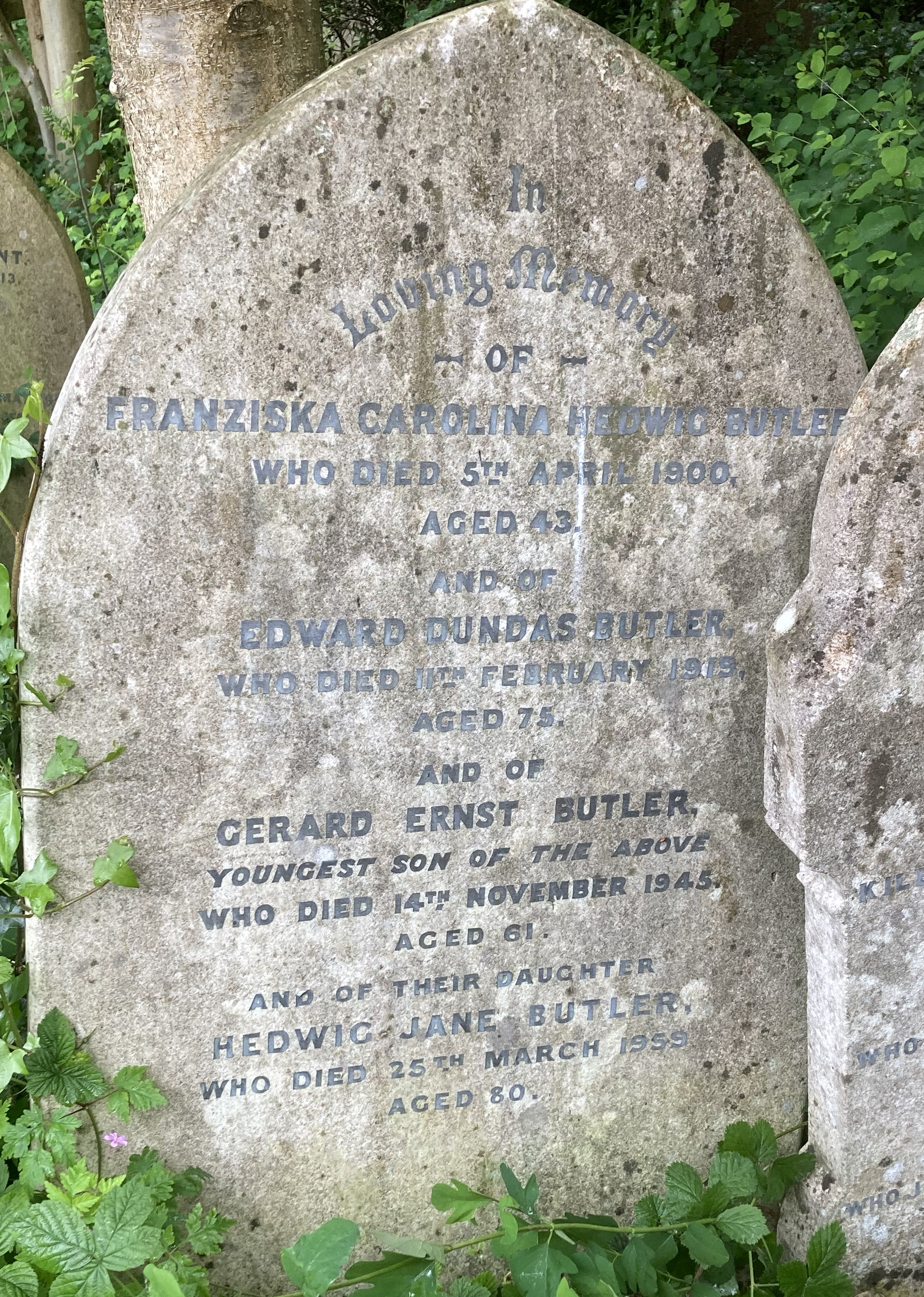
Family grave of Edward Dundas Butler in Highgate Cemetery

== Biography ==
Butler was born on 15 October 1842 at 6 Cheyne Walk, Chelsea, the son of Thomas Butler and his wife, Jane Isabella, née North.

He attended the Blue Coat School after which, in 1859 at the age of seventeen, he joined the department of printed books at the British Museum as a transcriber. In 1867 he transferred to the new Department of Maps and was promoted to second in command two years later. In 1880 he was promoted again and moved back to the main library where he oversaw additions to the map collection, prepared the map catalogue for printing, and catalogued general works in the so-called ‘difficult languages’, which, in his case, included Hungarian, Finnish, and Romanian. This stimulated an interest in the literature written in these eastern European languages, encouraged by the Keeper of Printed Books, Thomas Watts (1811–1869), who laid a special emphasis on acquiring material in neglected languages. Butler proved himself an able translator from Hungarian and Finnish in particular.

His translations included a collection of poems and fables from the Hungarian (1877) as well as a longer piece by János Arany (1881). He was also responsible for the first history of Finnish literature in English, translated from the 1896 Finnish original of B. F. Godenhjelm, son of the painter Berndt Godenhjelm. He also contributed to the Encyclopaedia Britannica (9th edn, 1875–89) as well as to miscellaneous periodicals, and as a result of his literary activity, in 1879 he was elected as a corresponding member of the Kisfaludy Society and two year later became an external member of the Hungarian Academy of Sciences.

== Personal life ==
He married German born Franziska Carolina Hedwig (1857-1900) and they had five children, Hedwig, Edward, Frank, Gerard and Hilda. Butler died of heart failure on 11 February 1919 at his home, 66 Whitehall Park, Islington and is buried with his wife and two of his children on the western side of Highgate Cemetery.
