= Donald Philippi =

Donald L. Philippi
- Born: Donald L. Philippi; October 2, 1930
- Died: January 26, 1993 (aged 62)
- Occupation: Translator
- Years active: 1957 – 1993

Donald L. Philippi (October 2, 1930 – January 26, 1993) was a noted translator of Japanese and Ainu. He was also an electronic musician.

Born in Los Angeles, Philippi studied at the University of Southern California before going to Japan in 1957 on a Fulbright scholarship to study at the Kokugakuin University. In Japan he became an expert in both classical Japanese and Ainu. In the late 1960s Philippi was involved with the Kakumaru movement, but later became disillusioned and left.

Philippi is known for his translation of the Kojiki and the ancient Shinto prayers known as norito. He also published a book of translations of Ainu epic poems (yukar), Songs of Gods, Songs of Humans: The Epic Tradition of the Ainu, and a book of translations of ancient Japanese poems, This Wine of Peace, This Wine of Laughter: A Complete Anthology of Japan's Earliest Songs. Philippi was also a noted technical translator.

Under the pseudonym Slava Ranko, Philippi edited and published Maratto, a little magazine focused on Ainu literature and culture. The first issue was published March 3, 1977 in San Francisco.

Philippi was also a musician, learning the shamisen and the biwa both in the U.S. and Japan. In the late 1970s, he became familiar in the San Francisco music scene, again using the name Slava Ranko, and performing a combination of biwa and synthesizer music. In 1981, he issued an album, Arctic Hysteria.

== Publications ==
- Philippi, Donald L. 1968–1969. Kojiki. Princeton, N.J.: Princeton University Press and Tokyo: University of Tokyo Press. (ISBN 978-0691061603)
