= Aubertine Woodward Moore =

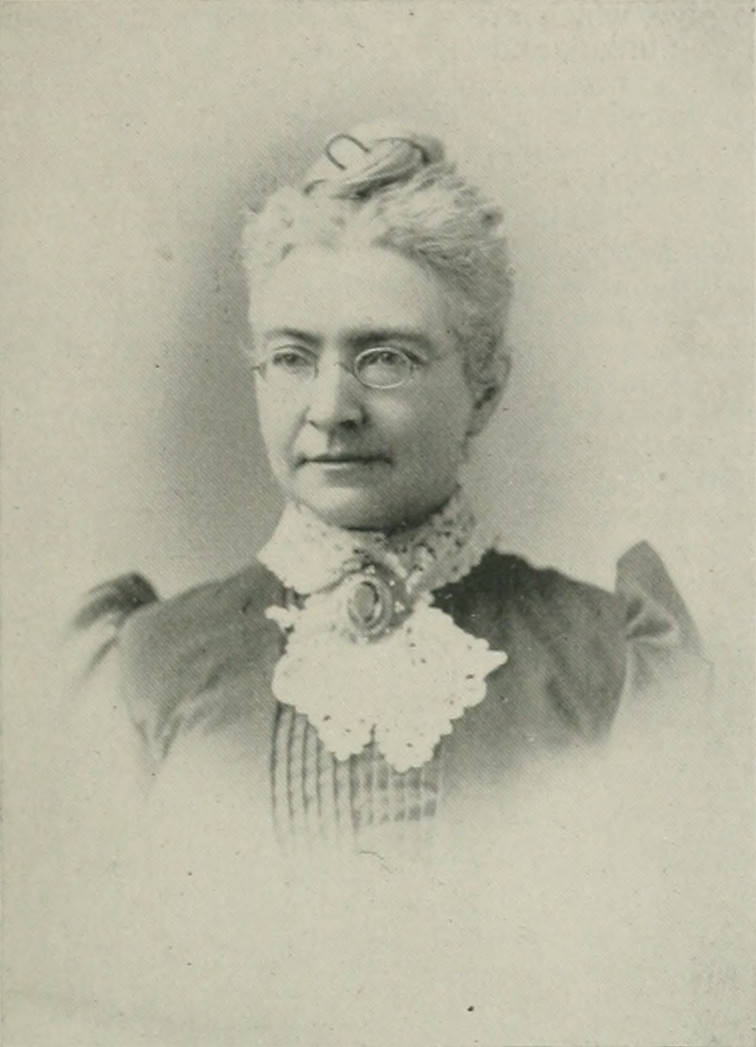
- "A woman of the century"
- Born: Annie Aubertine Woodward; September 27, 1841; Philadelphia, Pennsylvania, U.S.
- Died: 1929 (aged 87–88)
- Occupations: musician, writer, musical critic, translator, and lecturer
- Spouse: Samuel H. Moore (m. 1887)
- Writing career
- Pen name: Auber Forestier
- Language: English
- Subject: Scandinavian literature

Aubertine Woodward Moore (pen name, Auber Forestier; September 27, 1841 – 1929) was an American musician, writer, musical critic, translator, and lecturer. She resided in Madison, Wisconsin, since 1877, and lectured extensively, especially on Norwegian literature and music. She gave piano recitals and concerts in Boston, Philadelphia, and New York City. Moore was a founder of the Wisconsin Conservatory of Music.

Early on, she also devoted herself to literary pursuits, and translated extensively from the French and German. She was occupied in translating from the Scandinavian tongues with Rasmus B. Anderson in 1876, and for 12 years was busy preparing English versions of Bjørnstjerne Bjørnson's novels (Boston, 1881–82), and of Georg Brandes' Authors of the Nineteenth Century (New York. 1886). Additional works include English versions from the German of Robert von Bayer's (pen name, Robert Byr) Sphynx (Philadelphia, 1871); The Struggle for Existence (1873); Sophie Alberti's (pen name, Sophie Verena) Above the Tempest and the Tide (1873); "Samuel Brohl & Co.," from the French of Victor Cherbuliez (New York, 1877); Echoes from the Mist Land, or the Nibelungen-Lied Revealed (Chicago, 1880); The Spell-Bound Fiddler, from the Norse of Kristofer Janson (1881); The Norway Music Album, Norway folk-songs, dances, and so forth, edited and furnished with English text (Boston. 1881); and Voice-Culture from the German (1885). Most of her writings were published under the pen name of "Auber Forestier".

== Early years and education ==
Annie Aubertine (sometimes misspelled "Albertine") Woodward was born near Philadelphia, Pennsylvania, September 27, 1841. Her parents were Joseph Janvier Woodward and Elizabeth Graham Cox Woodward. Her father and grandfather were publishers, and Moore was born and reared in an atmosphere of literature and music. On her mother's side, she was of Swedish ancestry, through ancestors who left Sweden in the reign of Queen Christina and settled in New Sweden, on the Delaware River. Her brother was the surgeon, Joseph Janvier Woodward.

Moore received a broad education in Philadelphia, including a course of music under Carl Gaetner, artist and composer. Her studies included modern languages, and her first literary work consisted of musical sketches and criticism, published both in the United States and Germany.

== Career ==
Writing under the pen name "Auber Forestier," Moore's work attracted attention immediately. During a stay of some length in California, she contributed to the Philadelphia papers a series of letters on that State and its resources. Returning to the East, she published translations of several novels from the German, including The Sphinx, by Robert von Bayer, in 1871; Above Tempest and Tide, by Sophie Alberti, in 1873, and Struggle for Existence, by Robert Byr (pen name of Robert von Bayer), in 1873. She translated Victor Cherbuliez's Samuel Brohl and Company, which appeared as Number 1 of "Appleton's series of Foreign Authors." Then followed in rapid succession stories, sketches, translations of poetry for music, and original songs. She became interested in the Nibelungenlied, and in 1877, she published Echoes from Mist-Land: Or, the Nibelungen Lay, Revealed to Lovers of Romance and Chivalry, which was a prose version of the poem. Hers was the first U.S. translation of that work, and it was favorably received in the U.S., England, and Germany.

In 1879, she went to Madison, Wisconsin, to extend her studies in Scandinavian literature, under the direction of Prof. Anderson. She soon brought out a translation of Kristofer Janson's Spell-Bound Fiddler, which was a true narrative of a real character, Torgeir Audunson, a violinist, who died in Telemark in 1872. The book was republished in London, England. She then assisted Anderson in the translation of Bjørnson's novels, and Georg Brandes' Eminent Authors. Those two pioneers in the translation of Norse literature published The Norway Music Album, a valuable collection of Norwegian folks-songs, dances, naturalairs, and recent compositions for the pianoforte and solo singing. In December 1887, she married Samuel H. Moore.

Moore read papers before women's clubs, schools of philosophy, literary societies, editorial conventions, and Unitarian conferences. She was an authority on the music, history and literature of the Scandinavians, and a collection of her writings in that field forms a compendium of Scandinavian lore. She did valuable work in making Americans familiar with Norwegian literature and music in her "Evenings with the Music and Poetry of Norway," which she initiated in Concord, Massachusetts, while visiting relatives in that town. Reading the songs and playing the airs upon the piano, she aroused an intense interest in the attendees, and was invited to give similar "evenings" before numerous clubs and art societies, including the Woman's Club, of Boston, Sorosis, of New York City, and others in the East and West. As a translator of the poetry of Norwegian, French, and German writers she was unparalleled. Her translation of Goethe's Erlkönig was called by Prof. William Torrey Harris "by all odds the finest ever made." Her translations of some of the poems of "Carmen Sylva", the Queen consort of Romania, were widely read, and the queen sent her an autographed letter acknowledging the merit of her translations.

== Selected works ==
- Echoes from Mist-land; or, The Nibelungen Lay, Revealed to Lovers of Romance, 1889
- For my musical friend : a series of practical essays on music and music culture, 1900
- For Every Music Lover: A Series of Practical Essays on Music, 1902
- Songs from the North : representative songs of Norway, Sweden, and Denmark, 1907
- The Norway music album : a selection for home use, from Norway's folk-songs, dances, etc., national airs, and recent compositions, arranged for pianoforte and solo singing, with a few four part songs, 1909
- Our Children, the Hope of Music: Building a Musical America,
- Above Tempest and Tide
