= George Grube =

Canadian classics scholar and translator (1899–1982)

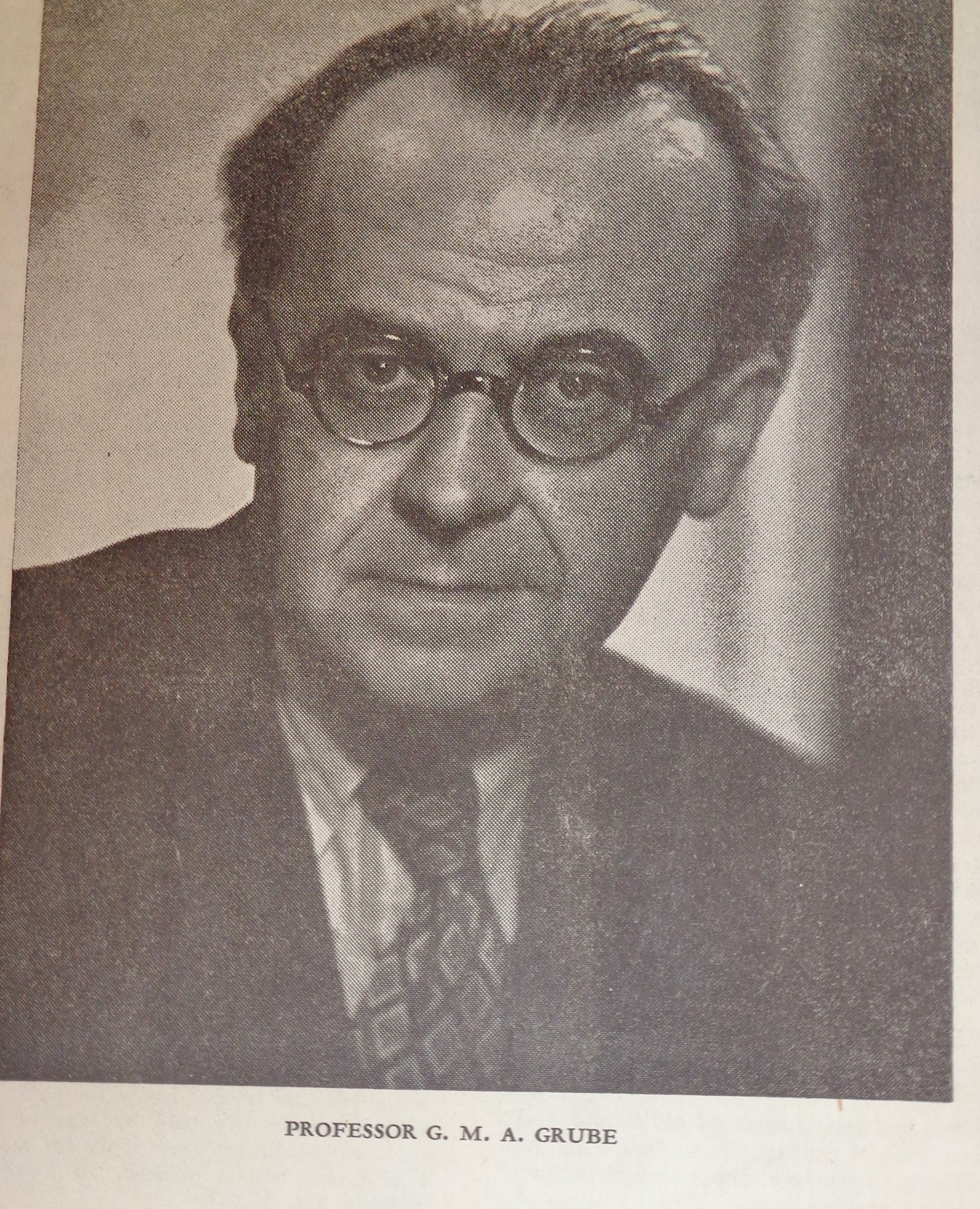

Georges Maximilien Antoine Grube (2 August 1899 – 13 December 1982) was a Canadian scholar, university professor and democratic socialist political activist. Grube was a classicist and translator of Plato, Aristotle, Longinus and Marcus Aurelius. He was one of the founders of the New Democratic Party of Canada and ran unsuccessfully for election as an NDP candidate in Canadian federal elections.

== Biography ==
Grube was born in Antwerp, Belgium, on 2 August 1899, and was educated at King Edward's School in Birmingham, England. He served as a translator for the Belgian Army, attached to the British Expeditionary Force, during the First World War. Following demobilisation in 1919 Grube studied the classics tripos at Emmanuel College, Cambridge, and was awarded a first-class BA in 1922 and MA (Cantab) in 1925.

He moved to Canada in 1928, to begin his career as a professor of classics at the University of Trinity College in the University of Toronto (U of T). He became the head of the classics department in 1931. Grube was a socialist, and serving in World War I turned him into a passionate pacifist. During his tenure at the U of T, he was involved in the Toronto branch of the League for Social Reconstruction (LSR), serving as president from 1934 to 1935. When the LSR took control of the nearly bankrupt magazine, Canadian Forum, Grube became its editor from 1937 to 1941. It was during his tenure at the magazine that it became the main media outlet for the LSR's publications.

From 1944 to 1946, Grube was the President of the Ontario Co-operative Commonwealth Federation's (CCF) executive, often acting as the public spokesperson for the party after its leader, Ted Jolliffe, lost his seat in the Ontario general election on 4 June 1945. He also ran unsuccessfully several times for the House of Commons seat in what was then known as the Broadview electoral district during the 1940s.

In August 1961, he was one of the co-chairs presiding over the New Democratic Party's founding convention in Ottawa. In 1968, he won the Award of Merit from the American Philological Association (APA) for his 1965 book The Greek and Roman Critics. The APA gave him the award for "outstanding contribution to classical scholarship." Two-years later, while still the head of the classics department, he retired from U of T in 1970.

He continued writing new translations of Plato's works until his death. In his later years, he had health issues, and he finally succumbed to them in Toronto on 13 December 1982.

== Bibliography ==
- Plato's Thought. London: Methuen, 1935.
- The Drama of Euripides. London: Methuen, 1941.
- On Great Writing, translation of On the Sublime, by Longinus. New York: Liberal Arts Press, 1957.
- On Poetry and Style, translation with an introduction of The Poetics, by Aristotle. New York: Liberal Arts Press, 1958.
- A Greek Critic, translation with an introduction of On Style, by Demetrius of Phaleron. Toronto: University of Toronto Press, 1961.
- Meditations, translation of same by Marcus Aurelius. Indianapolis: Bobbs-Merrill, 1963.
- The Greek and Roman Critics. Toronto: University of Toronto Press, 1965.
- How Did the Greeks Look at Literature. Cincinnati: University of Cincinnati Press, 1967.
- The Republic. Indianapolis: Hackett, 1974.
- Plato's Meno. Indianapolis: Hackett, 1976.
- Plato's Phaedo. Indianapolis: Hackett, 1977.
- Five Dialogues, translation of Euthyphro, Apology of Socrates, Crito, Meno, and Phaedo, by Plato. Indianapolis: Hackett, 1981.
