= Jean-Paul-Weg =

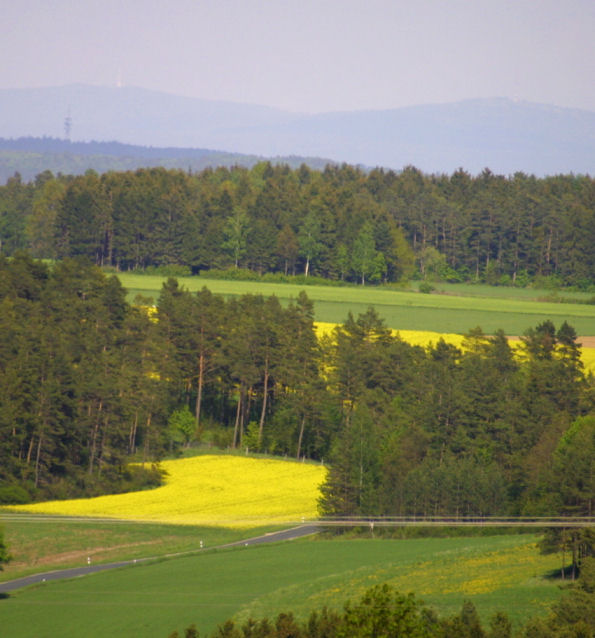
In the Fichtel Mountains, southeast of Bischofsgrün

The Jean-Paul-Weg is a 150 km hiking trail in Germany in honour of the writer Jean Paul Friedrich Richter (1763–1825), leading through the Franconian Forest, Fichtel Mountains, and Little Switzerland.

It passes through the landscapes and places that shaped Jean Paul's life. Along the way, walkers on the trail can read panels on which are printed short excerpts from the works and notebooks of the poet. It is a joint project of the districts of Wunsiedel, Bayreuth, the Fichtelgebirge Society and all the communities and towns on the route. The main sponsors include the tourism agencies, the district of Upper Franconia, the Upper Franconia Foundation and the Cultural Fund of Bavaria, the European Union and the Nuremberg Insurance Group.

The first stage of the trail was marked out in the district of Upper Franconia on 4 May 2002 with the section between Joditz (in Köditz) and Hof, Bavaria. The last section, the 17 km from Eckersdorf to Sanspareil (in Wonsees), was completed in 2012.

== Stages ==
- Joditz (Gemeinde Köditz, Lkr. Hof) – Fattigsmühle – Saalebrücke BAB 72 – Hof/Saale (10 km)
- Hof/Saale – Döhlau – Oberkotzau – Fattigau – Schwarzenbach a.d. Saale (17 km)
- Schwarzenbach a.d. Saale – Hallerstein – Sparneck – Großer Waldstein – Ruppertsgrün – Weißenstadt (24 km)
- Weißenstadt – Grub – Egertal – Röslau – Bibersbach – Valetsberg – Wunsiedel (17 km)
- Wunsiedel – Katharinenberg – Bad Alexandersbad – Luisenburg – Nagel (14 km)
- Nagel – Fichtelsee – Fichtelberg – Fichtelnaabquelle – Weißmainfelsen – Karches – Bischofsgrün – Hohehaid – Entenmühle – Ölschnitztal – Bad Berneck (30 km)
- Bad Berneck – Goldkronach – Bindlach – Oschenberg – Eremitage – Bayreuth (16 km)
- Bayreuth – Eckersdorf–Donndorf (Schloss Fantaisie) – Sanspareil (22 km)
