= Logbook of Giannozzo the Balloonist =

1801 novel by Jean Paul

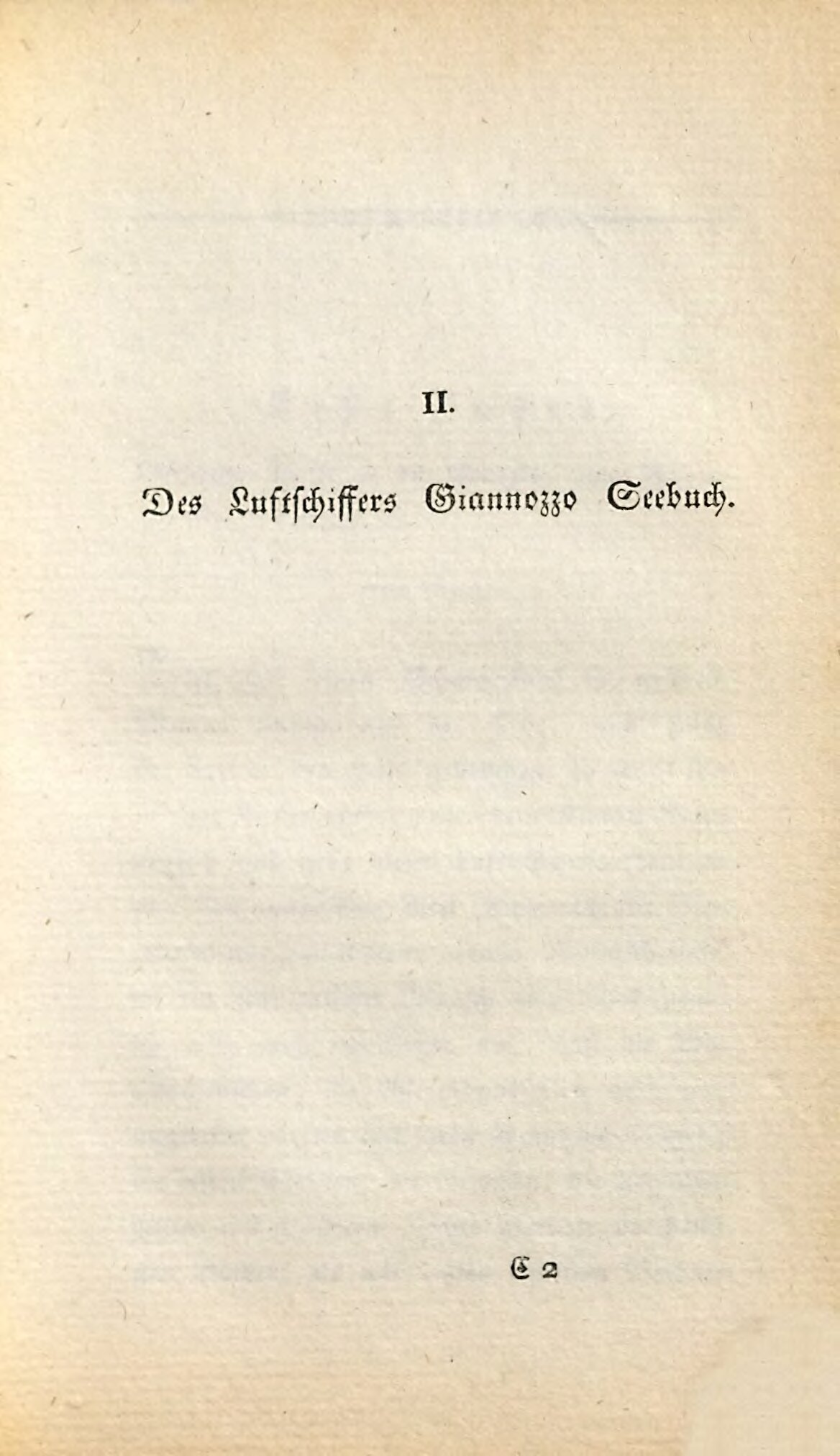
- Title page from Komischer Anhang zum Titan
- Author: Jean Paul
- Original title: Des Luftschiffers Giannozzo Seebuch
- Translator: David Dollenmayer
- Language: German
- Publisher: Karl Matzdorff
- Publication date: 1801
- Publication place: Prussia
- Pages: 180

Logbook of Giannozzo the Balloonist (German: Des Luftschiffers Giannozzo Seebuch) is an 1801 novel by the German writer Jean Paul. It is written as the logbook of a nobleman who does experimental flights with a hot air balloon and makes stops in various European towns. It has an introduction and footnotes by its fictional editor Leibgeber, who also appears in Jean Paul's novels Siebenkäs and Titan. The novel first appeared in volume two of Komischer Anhang zum Titan (lit. 'Comical Appendix to Titan'), published by Karl Matzdorff in Berlin.

The story was inspired by the ballooning experiments of the 1780s. Jean Paul was fascinated by the subject as a symbol for how fantasy can cross over into reality, the overcoming of limits, having a panoramic outlook, and an ethereal sense of freedom. The scholar Jochen Golz has analyzed Logbook of Giannozzo the Balloonist as a satirical panorama of the contradictions of its time, with conflicting political forces and intellectual currents following the ascent of the bourgeoisie in Europe.

== See also ==
- History of ballooning
