= George Guțu =

Romanian philologist

- Born: March 16, 1944 (age 82); Galați, Romania
- Died: 3 September 2023
- Occupation: Philologist

George Guțu (born March 16, 1944) is a Romanian philologist, teacher in the Department of German Language and Literature of the Faculty of Foreign Languages and Literatures, University of Bucharest. He is also director of the Paul Celan Center for Research and Excellence and the Master programme "Intercultural Literary and Linguistic Communication Strategies" (Strategii comunicaționale interculturale – literare și lingvistice), initiated by the Department of Germanic Languages and Literatures together with other departments of the Faculty of Foreign Languages and Literatures. His academic activity is based on the history of German literature (Age of Enlightenment, Sturm und Drang, Classicism, Romanticism); German and Austrian contemporary literature; German literature from Romania, cultural inter-referentiality in Central and Southeast Europe, particularly in Bukovina, poetics, literary theory, translation, the history of German studies and guidance for PhD students. His research domains are the history of German literature; comparative literature; German literature from Romania; cultural inter-referentiality; imagology; the history and aesthetics of reception; theory and practice of translation.

== Studies ==
George Guțu studied at Mihail Kogălniceanu High School in Galați, where he learned Russian and German as foreign languages. In 1963, he took the baccalaureate exam, followed by the entrance exam at the Faculty of Romanian Language and Literature, University of Bucharest. Starting in 1963, he studied two semesters at the University of Bucharest, but in 1964 he applied for a scholarship of the Ministry of Education of Romania in socialist countries. He attended two semesters in order to prepare for the baccalaureate exam for higher education in German at the Herder Institute in Leipzig. From 1965 to 1969 he studied German Studies and Cultural Sciences at the University of Leipzig. He wrote his first intermediate paper entitled "Zur Lyrik von Ingeborg Bachmann"("Ingeborg Bachmann's Poetry") and a graduation thesis "Das Problem der 'Biographie' bei Max Frisch. (Unter gelegentlicher Bezugnahme auf Ingeborg Bachmanns Erzählungen)" ["The Problem of 'Biography' of Max Frisch (with occasional references to Ingeborg Bachmann's work)"]. In 1969, Guțu obtained his diploma in German Studies with "excellent" results, together with Sergio Bertocchi from Italy, he was ranked the best student of the class. In recognition of this, both were offered the opportunity to continue PhD studies at the University of Leipzig. He decided in 1973 to attend extramural PhD studies at the University of Leipzig with professor Walter Dietze and later with professor Walfried Hartinger. On October 14, 1977, he presented his PhD dissertation "Die rumänische Koordinate der Lyrik Paul Celans" ("The Romanian Coordinate of Paul Celan's poetry").

== Professional career ==
In 1978, he began his career on the faculty of the University of Bucharest. He was awarded a Romanian degree as a Doctor of Philology became a lecturer in the Department of German Language and Literature at the University of Bucharest. In 1990, he became an assistant professor of German Language and Literature. Later, he was elected as a member of the Goethe Society in Weimar and received a scholarship from that institution. In January 2004, he was re-elected as head of the Department of German Language and Literature, University of Bucharest. From October 1, 2004, to July 31, 2005, he served as professor and titular of the Department "Elias Canetti" for Southeast European Intercultural Studies of Viadrina European University in Frankfurt (Oder), Germany. He was an academic teacher at the Institute of German Studies and Institute of Romance Studies of the Sapienza University of Rome from October to December 2006. In 2007 he initiated and founded the Paul Celan Centre for Research and Excellence of the Department of German Language and Literature, University of Bucharest. Over the years 2010 and 2011, he debuted as the initiator and director of the Master programme "Intercultural Literary and Linguistic Communication Strategies", promoted by the Department of German Language and Literature in collaboration with the Departments of Romance, Classical, Slavic and Canadian Studies of the Faculty of Foreign Languages and Literatures. In 2012 he was invited for a special seminar, "Interculturalism beyond the Borders of Bukovina", at the Faculty of Cultural Sciences, Viadrina European University. Guțu is a scholar of the Ministry of Education in Romania, the Goethe Institute, DAAD in Bonn, of Österreich-Kooperation, Vienna, the Austrian Society for Literature, the Erasmus, Socrates and Leonardo da Vinci programmes.

=== Memberships ===
- Member of the Writers Union of Romania;
- Founding member of the Institute for Germans' Culture and History in Southeast Europe University LMU Munich;
- President of the Society of Romanian Germanists (S.R.G.);
- President of "Goethe" Society from Romania;
- Since 2007: Member of the scientific board of the magazine "Annals of the University of Bucharest – Foreign Languages and Literatures Series" ISSN 1220-0263;
- Since 2008: Member of the scientific board of the periodical "Futark. Revista de Investigacion y Cultura" from Seville (Spain) ISSN 1886-9300; Scientific reviewer of the magazine "Annals of the "Spiru Haret" University – Philology Series";
- Since 2009: Member of the board of scientific reviewers (peer review) of the publication "Germanistische Beiträge" in Sibiu ISSN 1454-5144;
- Since 2010: Member of the scientific board of the publication "Kronstädter germanistischen Beiträge zur Forschung " in Brasov;
- 2009–2010: Member of the International Scientific Council for organizing and conducting the Biennial and Festival of Translation Europa Spazio di Traduzione, organized by the Naples Eastern University, with the participation of the Centre for Research and Excellence "Paul Celan", University of Bucharest; Organizer and moderator of the Round Table "Vita e vitalità delle 'lingue minori'";
- Since 2011: Member of the Board "Institut zur Erforschung und Förderung regionaler und transnationaler Kulturprozesse" (INST, Vienna); Honorary Member of the Society "Simion C. Mândrescu" in Romania;

=== Prizes and awards ===
- October 2006: Diploma of Honor "Virtue et Sapientia " of the University of Bucharest "for excellent performance om researching during the year 2005";
- July 2011: Awarded with the Order of Cultural Merit – Knight of the Romanian Presidency;
- March 2012: Awarded with the Austrian Cross of Honour for Science and Art.

== Selection from Released Books ==
George Guțu has written numerous scientific publications such as books, studies, reviews or reports.

- 1986 "Abriß der Geschichte der rumäniendeutschen Literatur. Teil I: Von den Anfängen bis 1918 – Spezialvorlesung" Printing House of the University of Bucharest;
- 1990 "Die Lyrik Paul Celans und der geistige Raum Rumäniens";
- 1992 The initiative of establishing a specialized magazine of the S.G.R., "Zeitschrift der Germanisten Rumäniens";
- 1994 Translation "Dans în lanțuri", Hans Bergel;
- 1994 "Die Lyrik Paul Celans und die rumänische Dichtung der Zwischenkriegszeit";
- 1995 Translation "Lupul de stepă", Hermann Hesse, printing 1995 / 2005 / 2006;
- 1996 Translation "Siddhartha. O poemă indiană", Hermann Hesse, printing 1996 / 2005 / 2006;
- 1997 Book series "GGR-Beiträge zur Germanistik", the first volume "Beiträge zur Geschichte der Germanistik in Rumänien";
- 1997 "Germanistik an Hochschulen in Rumänien. Verzeichnis der Hochschullehrerinnen und Hochschullehrer";
- 1998 Translation "Când vin vulturii", Hans Bergel;
- 1998 Translation "Liniștea de după lovitura de secure", Matthias Buth;
- 2001 "Geschichte der deutschen Literatur. Textanthologie. Bd. I: Ältere deutsche Literatur";
- 2002–2010 "transcarpathica germanistisches jahrbuch rumänien";
- 2002 Translation "Vis cu ochii deschiși. Poeme.", Rose Ausländer;
- 2002 Translation "Ecouri răzlețe", Hans Dama;
- 2005 Translation "Episcop în România într-o epocă a conflictelor naționale și religioase", Raymund Netzhammer;
- 2005 Translation "Antichitățile creștine din Dobrogea", Raymund Netzhammer;
- 2009 "Geschichte der deutschen Literatur. Textanthologie. Bd. II: Humanismus. Reformation. Barock (1400–1700)";
- 2009 Translation "Scrisori către Wolfgang Kraus 1971–1990", Emil Cioran;
- 2010 Translation "Din România. Incursiuni prin această țară și istoria ei", Raymund Netzhammer.

== Released Books in Cooperation ==
- 2002 "Stundenwechsel. Neue Perspektiven zu Alfred Margul-Sperber, Rose Ausländer, Paul Celan, Immanuel Weissglas (GGR-Beiträge zur Germanistik)", in cooperation with Martin Hainz, Andrei Corbea-Hoisie;
- 2003 "Kindheit: Fragment einer Autobiographie (Bukowiner Literaturlandschaft)", in cooperation with Doris Rosenkranz;
- 2005 "Interkulturelle Grenzgänge. Akten der Wissenschaftlichen Tagung des Bukarester Instituts für Germanistik zum 100. Geburtstag", in cooperation with Doina Sandu;
- 2007 "Fremde Arme – arme Fremde. "Zigeuner" in Literaturen Mittel- und Osteuropas", in cooperation with Herbert Uerlings, Iulia-Karin Patrut;
- 2008 "Minderheitenliteraturen – Grentzerfahrung und Reterritorialisierung. Festschrift für Stefan Sienerth", in cooperation with Ioana Crăciun-Fischer, Iulia-Karin Patrut;
- 2009 ""...dass ich in der Welt zu Hause bin." Hans Bergels Werk in sekundärliterarischem Querschnitt", in cooperation with Mariana Lăzărescu, Raluca Rădulescu;
- 2009 "Sprachheimat: Zum Werk von Dieter Schlesak in Zeiten von Diktatur und Exil", in cooperation with Jürgen Egyptien;
- 2011 "Die Buche: Eine Anthologie deutschsprachiger Judendichtung aus der Bukowina", in cooperation with Alfred Margul-Sperber, Peter Motzan, Stefan Sienerth;
- 2012 "Ost-West-Identitäten und -Perspektiven.: Deutschsprachige Literatur in und aus Rumänien im interkulturellen Dialog (Veröffentlichungen des Instituts ... der Ludwig-Maximilians-Universität München)", in cooperation with Ioana Crăciun-Fischer, Sissel Laegreid, Peter Motzan;
- 2015 "Kindheit – Hörbuch, 6 Audio-CDs: Fragment einer Autobiographie (Bukowiner Literaturlandschaft", in cooperation with Moses Rosenkranz;
- 2015 "Briefe an Alfred Margul-Sperber: (1930–1963) mit autobiographischen sowie literaturkritischen Dokumenten (Bukowiner Literaturlandschaft)", in cooperation with Moses Rosenkranz, Jürgen Kostka;
- 2016 "Jugend – Hörbuch, MP3-CD: Fragment einer Autobiographie (Bukowiner Literaturlandschaft)", in cooperation with Moses Rosenkranz, Matthias Huff, Jürgen Kostka, Nikolaus Paryla.

== Other Cultural Activities ==
- 1990:The initiative of establishing the "Society of Romanian Germanists" ("S.G.R.; Gesellschaft der Germanisten Rumäniens") as a continuation of the tradition from the interwar period;
- 1997:The initiative of establishing and creation of S.G.R. web page (among the first in Europe in the field) and its constantly update;
- 1998: The initiative of establishing the "Goethe" Society in România ("Goethe-Gesellschaft in Rumänien"), election as its president;
- 1999: The initiative of organizing the International Symposium dedicated to the celebration of 250 years since the birth of Johann Wolfgang Goethe by the "Goethe" Society in Romania, in cooperation with the Romanian Academy, S.G.R., Ministry of Culture of Romania and "Goethe]]" Society in Weimar;
- 2002: The initiative of organizing the International Symposium "Rose Ausländer" at Bucharest;
- December 2006: Co-organizer of the jubilee celebrations dedicated to the 15th anniversary of establishing Libraries "Austria" from Romania and Bulgaria in Vienna, in collaboration with the Romanian Embassy in Vienna and the Austrian Ministry of Foreign Affairs;
- 2008–2010: Co-initiator and coordinator from the Centre for Research and Excellence "Paul Celan" of the international project European Partnership of Intercultural Communications "Leonardo da Vinci", approved and funded by the European Union, with the participation of universities in Bucharest, Munich, Debrecen and Veliko Tarnovo.

== Political career ==
- 1969 (autumn) – 1970 (summer): Reviewer at the Ministry of Foreign Affairs on his own initiative;
- 1994: The organization of the III International Congress of Romanian Germanists (May 16–19, 1994, Neptun) after a break of 62 years of tradition started in the interwar period of these congresses;
- 1997: The organization of the IV International Congress of Romanian Germanists (May 2–5, 1997, Sinaia);
- 2000: The organization of the V International Congress of Romanian Germanists (May 22–25, 2000, Iași);
- 2003: The organization of the VI International Congress of Romanian Germanists (May 26–29, 2003, Sibiu);
- 2006: The organization of the VII International Congress of Romanian Germanists (May 22–25, 2006, Timișoara);
- 2009: The organization of the VIII International Congress of Romanian Germanists (May 25–28, 2009, Cluj-Napoca);
- 2012: The organization of the VIII International Congress of Romanian Germanists (Juni 4-7, 2012, Bucharest)
