= Elisabeth Axmann =

Romanian writer (1926–2015)

- Born: 19 June 1926; Siret, Suceava County, Romania
- Died: 21 April 2015 (aged 88); Cologne, North Rhine-Westphalia, Germany
- Occupation: Writer

Elisabeth Axmann (19 June 1926 in Siret – 21 April 2015 in Cologne) was a Romanian writer, art and literature critic. She spent her childhood in Bukovina, Moldavia and Transylvania. Axmann moved to Germany in 1977.

== Selected works ==
- Spiegelufer. Gedichte 1968-2004. Aachen: Rimbaud Verlag, 2004 (2nd Ed. 2017). ISBN 3-89086-678-6
- Wege, Städte. Erinnerungen. Aachen: Rimbaud Verlag, 2005. ISBN 3-89086-627-1
- Fünf Dichter aus der Bukowina (Alfred Margul-Sperber, Rose Ausländer, Moses Rosenkranz, Alfred Kittner, Paul Celan). Aachen: Rimbaud Verlag, 2007. ISBN 978-3-89086-561-4.
- Die Kunststrickerin. Erinnerungssplitter. Aachen: Rimbaud Verlag, 2010. ISBN 978-3-89086-493-8
- Glykon. Gedichte. Aachen: Rimbaud Verlag, 2012. ISBN 978-3-89086-447-1

== Translations ==
- Werner Hofmann, Fundamentele artei moderne. O introducere în formele ei simbolice, volumul I, traducere de Elisabeth Axmann-Mocanu și Bucur Stănescu, prefață de Titus Mocanu, București, Editura Meridiane, 1977

== Editor ==
- Hochwasser 1970 Berichte, Interviews, Fotos, 91 pagini, Editura Kriterion 1970
- Elisabeth Axmann-Mocanu (Hrg.): Künstler in Hamburg. Christians Verlag Hamburg 1982, ISBN 3-7672-0749-4.
