= Tannbach =

Tannbach may refer to:

- Tannbach (Saale), a brook in north-east Bavaria and southern Thuringia, Germany
- Tannbach (TV series), a German television series
