= Beimel =

Beimel is a surname. Notable people with the surname include:

- Joe Beimel (born 1977), American baseball pitcher
- Thomas Beimel (1967–2016), German composer, violist, and musicologist
