= David Dollenmayer =

American academic and translator

David B. Dollenmayer (born 1945) is an American academic professor of German and literary translator known for his translations of contemporary German classics into English. He taught German in Worcester Polytechnic Institute, where he serves as an emeritus professor.

== Early life ==
Dollenmayer received his BA and PhD from Princeton University. After graduation, he became a Fulbright fellow at LMU Munich in Germany. Dollenmayer wrote The Berlin Novels Of Alfred Döblin in Berkeley, California and was published by the University of California Press in 1988. He also co-authored Custom Neue Horizonte: Introductory German with Thomas Hansen in 2013. He has also translated works from German to English.

== Works ==
=== Translations ===
- Rolf Bauerdick - The Madonna on the Moon
- Bertolt Brecht
- Elias Canetti and Veza Canetti - Dearest Georg: Love, Literature, and Power in Dark Times
- Jean Paul – Logbook of Giannozzo the Balloonist
- Peter Stephan Jungk - Crossing the Hudson
- Michael Kleeberg - The King of Corsica
- Stefan Klein - Survival of the Nicest: How Altruism Made Us Human and Why It Pays to Get Along
- Marie-Luise Knott - Unlearning with Hannah Arendt
- Michael Köhlmeier - Idyll with drowning dog
- Perikles Monioudis
- Anna Mitgutsch - House of Childhood
- Mietek Pemper - The Road to Rescue: The Untold Story of Schindler's List
- Ulrich Pfisterer (art historian) - The Sistine Chapel – Paradise in Rome
- Moses Rosenkranz - Childhood: An Autobiographical Fragment
- Rüdiger Safranski - Goethe: Life as a Work of Art
- Willibald Sauerländer - The Catholic Rubens: Saints and Martyrs
- Hansjörg Schertenleib - A Happy Man
- Daniel Schreiber - Susan Sontag: A Biography
- Gregor Von Rezzori - Abel and Cain
- Martin Walser - A Man in Love, A Gushing Fountain

== Legacy ==
Dollenmayer won the Helen and Kurt Wolff Translator's Prize in 2008, for his translation of Moses Rosenkranz's Childhood.
