= Robert Schindel =

Austrian lyricist, director and author

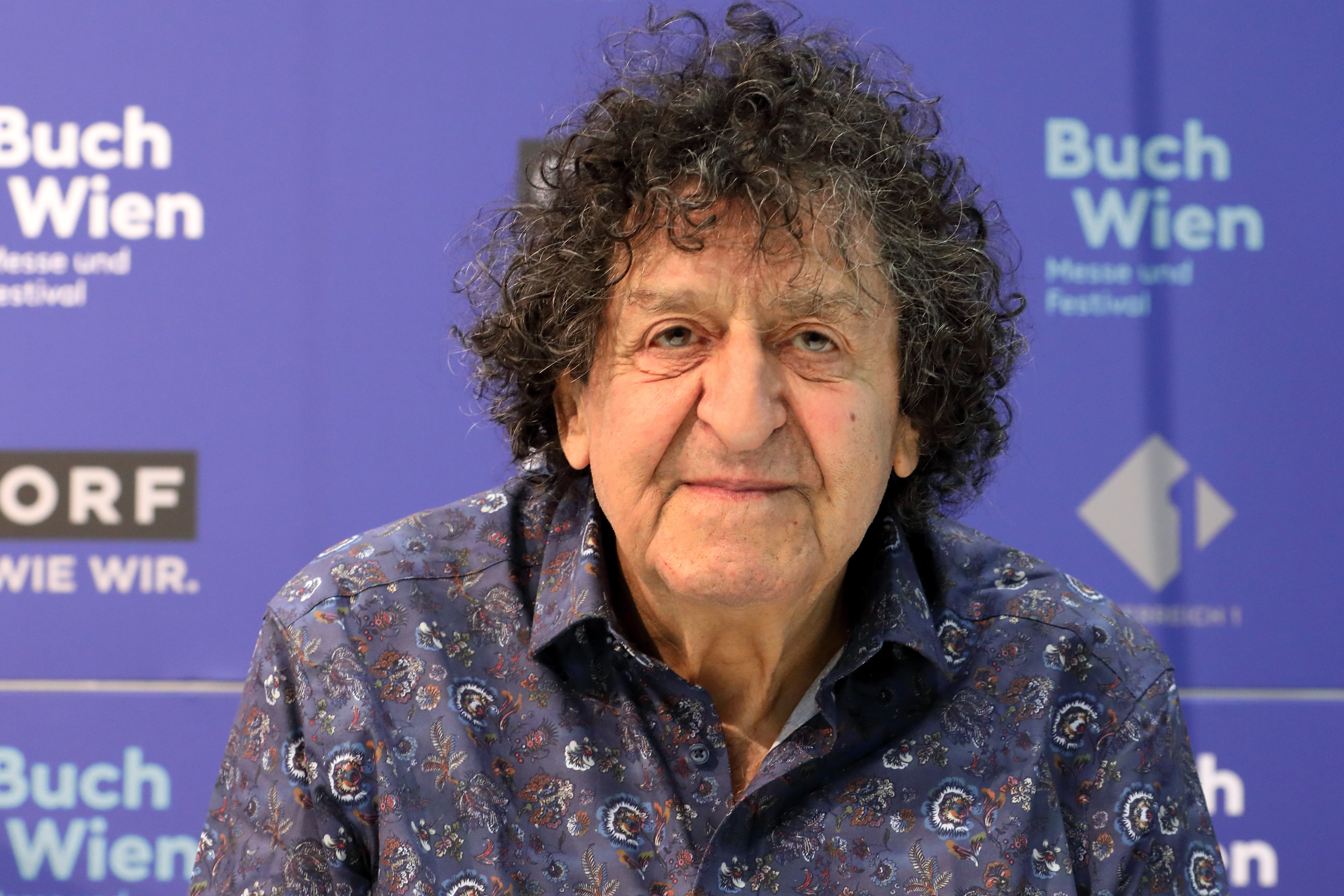
- Schindel at the Vienna Book in 2023
- Born: 4 April 1944 (age 82); Bad Hall, Upper Austria, Austria
- Occupations: Lyricist; director; author
- Political party: Communist Party of Austria (1961–1967)
- Awards: See Awards
- Website: Official website (in German)

Robert Schindel (born 4 April 1944) is an Austrian lyricist, director and author.

== Life and career ==
Robert Schindel was born on 4 April 1944 in Bad Hall, Upper Austria to Jewish communist parents.

From 1950 to 1954, he attended elementary school and then the Bundesrealgymnasium in Vienna. In 1959, Robert Schindel left the Gymnasium; he was "entlassen wegen schlechter Führung" ("dismissed because of poor conduct") and began an apprenticeship as a bookseller at Globus-Verlag in Vienna, which he broke off. This was followed by trips to Paris and Sweden, where he made his way as a dishwasher among other things.

According to his own statement, he was a member of the Communist Party of Austria from 1961 to 1967.

In 1967, Schindel caught up with his Matura, studied philosophy and law for two semesters and was involved in Maoist circles. However, he described Café Hawelka as his real university, where he met H. C. Artmann and Oskar Werner among others.

He became one of the founders of the student movement "Kommune Wien", based on the Berlin model, and the literary magazine Hundsblume, in which he also published his lyrical texts. Other artists who became famous later, such as Elfriede Jelinek and the twin couple Konstantin Kaiser and Leander Kaiser, also belonged to his circle. In 1970 Schindel published the novel Kassandra.

Robert Schindel is a member of the Freie Akademie der Künste in Hamburg and the Deutsche Akademie für Sprache und Dichtung. He founded the first state literary institution in Austria to promote creative writing and has been teaching there as a university lecturer at the Institute for Linguistic Art at the University of Applied Arts Vienna since 2009.

== Awards ==
- 1989: Förderpreis des Kulturkreises im Bundesverband der Deutschen Industrie
- 1991: Elias-Canetti-Stipendium der Stadt Wien
- 1992: Österreichischer Förderungspreis für Literatur
- 1992: Förderpreis des Marburger Literaturpreises
- 1992: Dr. Emil-Domberger-Literaturpreis der B'nai B'rith Européen
- 1993: Erich Fried Prize
- 1995/1996: Stadtschreiber von Klagenfurt
- 1997: DAAD-Stipendium in Berlin
- 2000: Mörike-Preis der Stadt Fellbach
- 2003: Literaturpreis der Stadt Wien
- 2005: Willy und Helga Verkauf-Verlon Preis des DÖW für österreichische antifaschistische Publizistik
- 2005: Silbernes Ehrenzeichen für Verdienste um das Land Wien
- 2007: Jakob-Wassermann-Literaturpreis der Stadt Fürth
- 2009: Kulturpreis des Landes Oberösterreich für Literatur
- 2010: Poetik-Professur an der Universität Bamberg
- 2013: Johann-Beer-Literaturpreis für Der Kalte
- 2014: Heinrich-Mann-Preis

== Works ==
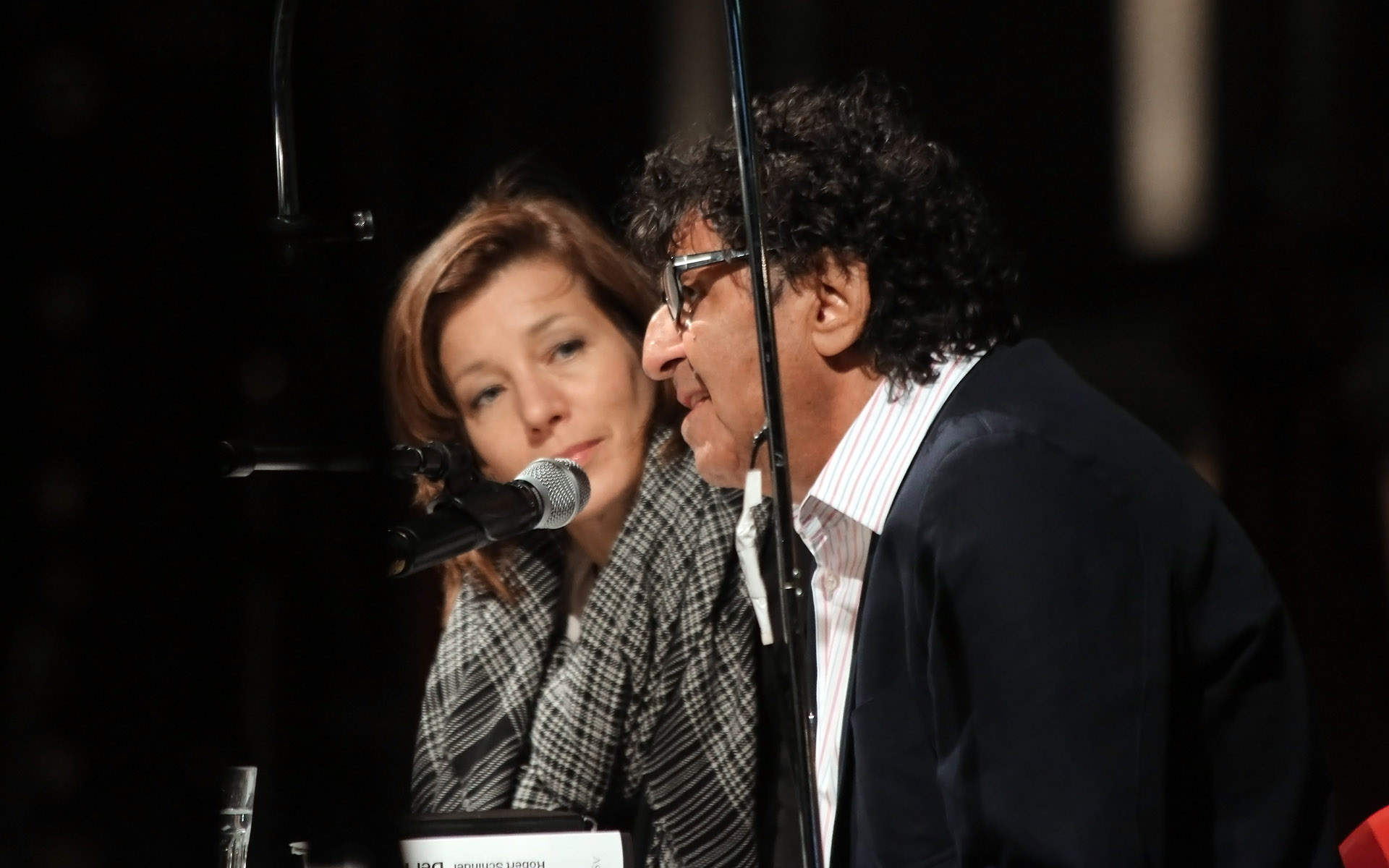
Schindel (right) with Clarissa Stadler at o-töne in 2013

- Ohneland. Gedichte vom Holz der Paradeiserbäume. 1979–1984. Suhrkamp, Frankfurt am Main 1986, ISBN 3-518-11372-0.
- Geier sind pünktliche Tiere. Gedichte. Suhrkamp, Frankfurt am Main 1987, ISBN 3-518-11429-8.
- Im Herzen die Krätze. Gedichte. Suhrkamp, Frankfurt am Main 1988, ISBN 3-518-11511-1.
- Ein Feuerchen im Hintennach. Gedichte 1986–1991. Suhrkamp, Frankfurt am Main 1992, ISBN 3-518-11775-0.
- Gebürtig. Roman. Suhrkamp, Frankfurt am Main 1992, ISBN 3-518-40438-5.
- Die Nacht der Harlekine. Erzählungen. Suhrkamp, Frankfurt am Main 1994, ISBN 3-518-40579-9.
- Gott schütz uns vor den guten Menschen. Jüdisches Gedächtnis – Auskunftsbüro der Angst. Suhrkamp, Frankfurt am Main 1995, ISBN 3-518-11958-3.
- Immernie. Gedichte vom Moos der Neunzigerhöhlen. Suhrkamp, Frankfurt am Main 2000, ISBN 3-518-12155-3.
- Nervös der Meridian. Gedichte. Suhrkamp, Frankfurt am Main 2003, ISBN 3-518-12317-3.
- Zwischen dir und mir wächst tief das Paradies. Liebesgedichte. Vorwort von André Heller; Illustrationen von Christof Subik. Insel Verlag, Frankfurt am Main/ Leipzig 2003 (Insel-Bücherei 1227), ISBN 3-458-19247-6.
- Fremd bei mir selbst. Gedichte. Nachwort Marcel Reich-Ranicki. Suhrkamp, Frankfurt am Main 2004 ISBN 3-518-41594-8
- Kassandra. Roman. Vorwort von Robert Menasse. Haymon, Innsbruck 1979/2004, ISBN 3-85218-446-0
- Wundwurzel. Gedichte. Suhrkamp, Frankfurt am Main 2005 ISBN 3-518-41705-3
- Der Krieg der Wörter gegen die Kehlkopfschreie, Capriccios. Haymon, 2008, ISBN 978-3-85218-573-6
- Mein mausklickendes Saeculum. Gedichte. Suhrkamp, Frankfurt am Main 2008, ISBN 978-3-518-42024-9
- Dunkelstein. Eine Realfarce. Haymon, Innsbruck 2010, ISBN 978-3-85218-645-0
- Man ist viel zu früh jung. Essays und Reden. Jüdischer Verlag im Suhrkamp Verlag, 2011, ISBN 978-3-633-54254-3
- Der Kalte. Roman. Suhrkamp, Berlin 2013, ISBN 978-3-518-42355-4
- Don Juan wird sechzig. Heiteres Drama. Hollitzer, Wien 2015, ISBN 978-3-99012-166-5
- Scharlachnatter. Gedichte. Suhrkamp, Berlin 2015, ISBN 978-3-518-42486-5

In anthology

- Aurélie Maurin, Thomas Wohlfahrt Hgg.: VERSschmuggel. InVERSible. Canadian poetry – Poésie du Quebec. (in German, English and French) Wunderhorn, Heidelberg 2008 ISBN 3884232991. With 2 CDs

== Theatre ==
- Dunkelstein, eine Realfarce (2008) – Premiere March 2016, Theater Nestroyhof Hamakom

== Literature ==
- Martin A. Hainz: "Todesfuge – Todesorgel". Zu Paul Celan und Robert Schindel. In: Zeitschrift für deutsche Philologie. Band 124 (2005), p. 227–242.
- Béatrice Gonzalés-Vangell: Kaddisch et Renaissance. La Shoah dans les romans viennois (1991–2001) de Robert Schindel, Robert Menasse et Doron Rabinovici. Septentrion, Valenciennes 2005, ISBN 2-85939-900-3.
- Matthias Beilein: 86 und die Folgen. Robert Schindel, Robert Menasse und Doron Rabinovici im literarischen Feld Österreichs. Erich Schmidt, Berlin 2008, ISBN 978-3-503-09855-2.
- Iris Hermann: Bei Robert Schindel in Wien zu Tisch. Rindfleisch und Knödel, Rotwein und Mokka. In: Claudia Lillge, Anne-Rose Meyer (publisher): Interkulturelle Mahlzeiten. Kulinarische Begegnungen und Kommunikation in der Literatur. Transcript, Bielefeld 2008, ISBN 978-3-89942-881-0, p. 105–123.
- Iris Hermann: Möchte ich ein schwimmender Schreiber sein. Von der "Wortsucht" in Robert Schindels Gedichtband "Wundwurzel". In: Zeitschrift für deutsche Philologie. Band 127 (2008), p. 269–284.
- Iris Hermann, Meinolf Schumacher: Da bin ich und das wars. "Strichpunktexistenz" und "Flüsterdennoch": Robert Schindels Gedicht "Amfortas" (2007). In: Sprachkunst. Band 39/1 (2008), p. 59–75 (PDF).
- Andrea Kunne: "Verschwinden. Zwischen den Wörtern". Sprache als Heimat im Werk Robert Schindels. Studien-Verlag, Innsbruck/ Wien/ Bozen 2009, ISBN 978-3-7065-4695-9.
- Iris Hermann (publisher): Fährmann sein. Robert Schindels Poetik des Übersetzen. Wallstein, Göttingen 2012, ISBN 978-3-8353-1062-9.
