= Dr. Katzenbergers Badereise =

1809 novel by Jean Paul

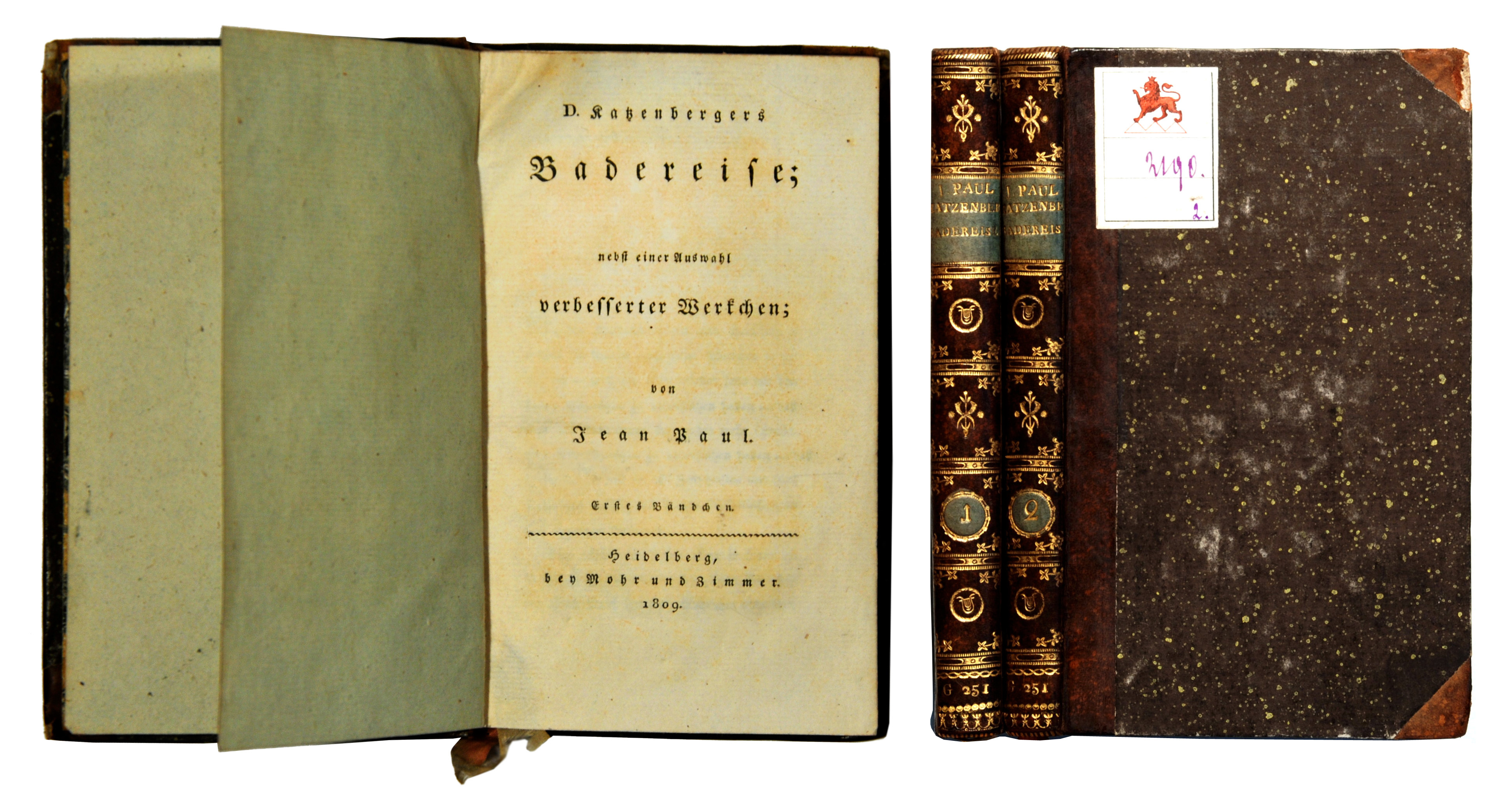
- Author: Jean Paul
- Language: German
- Publisher: Mohr und Zimmer
- Publication date: 1809
- Publication place: Baden

Dr. Katzenbergers Badereise (lit. 'Dr. Katzenberger's Bathing Trip') is a novel by the German writer Jean Paul. It takes place in the spa town of Bad Maulbronn and follows the intrigues of a professor who goes there to confront a physician who has given his books negative reviews, the professor's daughter, a poet who travels with them and is attracted to the daughter, and a young Prussian military writer who becomes the poet's rival.

The novel was written in 1807–1808 and first published by Mohr und Zimmer in Heidelberg in 1809, but only became popular with a revised and expanded version published in Breslau in 1822.

It was the basis for the 1978 television film Dr. Katzenbergers Badereise directed by Gerd Winkler for ZDF.
