= Tannbach (Saale) =

River in Germany

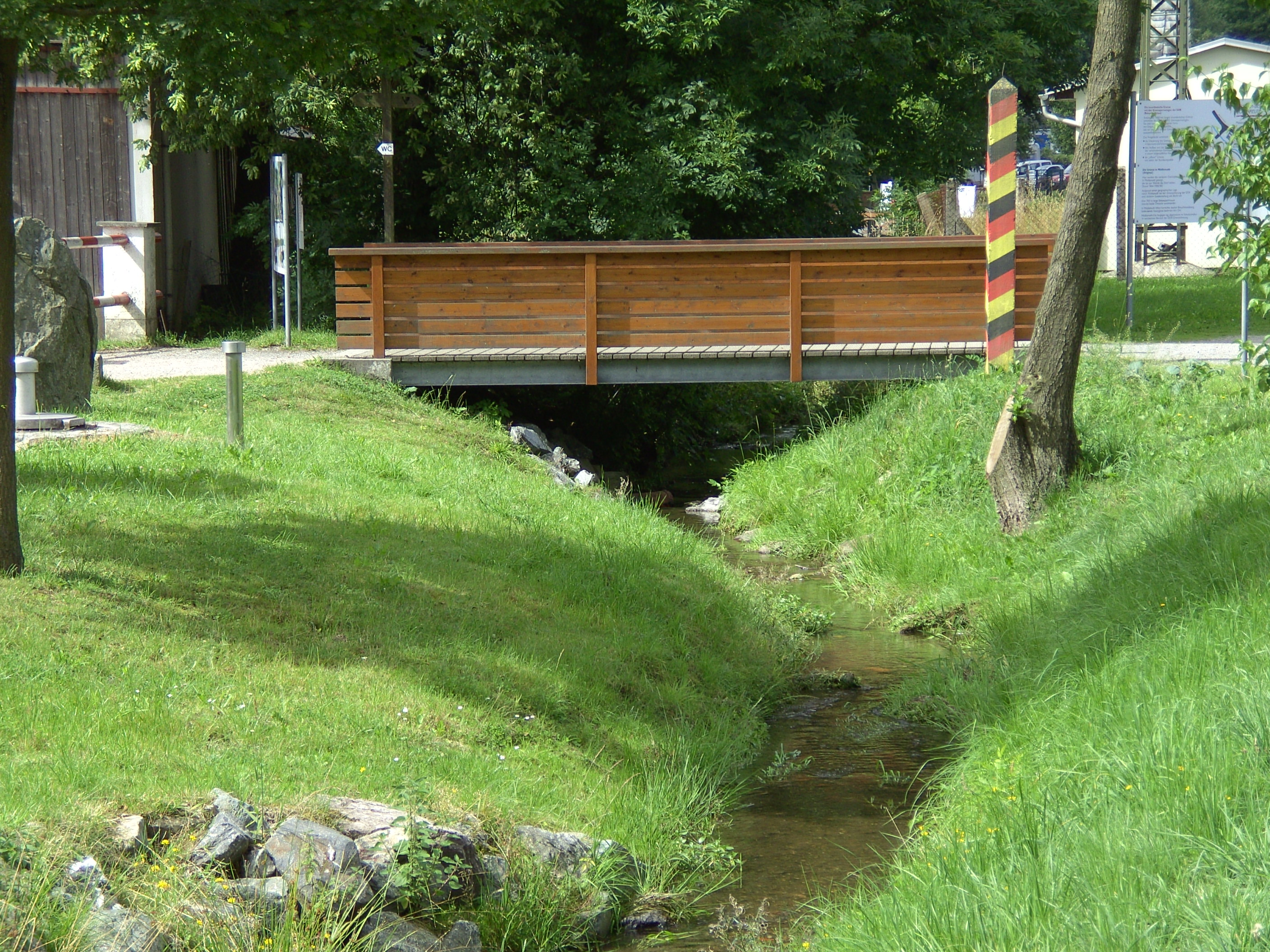
- The Tannbach in Mödlareuth

Location
- Country: Germany
- States: Bavaria and Thuringia

Physical characteristics
- Source
  - location: east of Gefell-Gebertsreuth
  - coordinates: 50°26′11.44″N 11°54′12.54″E
  - elevation: 620 m (2,030 ft) NN
- Mouth
  - location: Saale (between Joditz and Hirschberg )
  - coordinates: 50°23′38″N 11°50′06″E
  - elevation: 445 m (1,460 ft) NN
- Length: 8.7 km (5.4 mi)

Basin features
- Progression: Saale→ Elbe→ North Sea
- Tributaries
  - left: Kupferbach

Tannbach is a brook that is 8.7 kilometres (5.4 mi) long in north-east Bavaria and southern Thuringia, Germany.

The source is located east of Gefell in the Saale-Orla-Kreis district in Thuringia. Initially it flows south through Gebersreuth, a district of Gefell, before reaching Mödlareuth. During the Cold War the little brook marked the border between West and East Germany and divided the little village into two parts. After Mödlareuth it flows in south-westerly direction before it joins the Saale as right tributary.

== See also ==
- List of rivers of Bavaria
- List of rivers of Thuringia
