= Martin A. Hainz =

Austrian philosopher (born 1974)

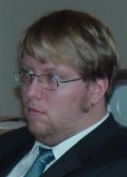
Martin A. Hainz

Martin Andreas Hainz (born 5 March 1974 in Vienna, Austria) is an Austrian philologist, theorist and philosopher. He has taught at several universities in Europe and the United States, among them the universities of Vienna, Timișoara and Iaşi. He is a member of the Northeastern Language Association (NEMLA). His main interests are contemporary Austrian philosophy and literature.

== Biography ==
Hainz's works deal with Paul Celan and Rose Ausländer as well as Friedrich Gottlieb Klopstock; he is also considered to be one of today's most important advocates of Jacques Derrida's deconstruction. He has also done work characterising poetry from a dialectical perspective.

Hainz has done research into some obscure authors and thinkers, such as Leopold von Sacher-Masoch, Alfred Margul-Sperber and Constantin Brunner. He has done research dealing with multiculturalism and its opportunities and history in Czernowitz. His book Vom Glück sich anzustecken (About the luck of getting infected), about translation, has been discussed intensely, with Vincent Kling calling it "beyond praise" in a review.

== Volumes ==
- Entgöttertes Leid. Zur Lyrik Rose Ausländers unter Berücksichtigung der Poetologien von Theodor W. Adorno, Peter Szondi und Jacques Derrida. Dissertation, Wien 2000
- Masken der Mehrdeutigkeit. Celan-Lektüren mit Adorno, Szondi und Derrida. Wien: Wilhelm Braumüller 2003, ISBN 3-7003-1454-X
- Heilige vs. unheilige Schrift, ed. Martin A. Hainz. In: TRANS · Internet-Zeitschrift für Kulturwissenschaften, Nr 16/2005
- Stundenwechsel. Neue Lektüren zu Rose Ausländer, Paul Celan, Alfred Margul-Sperber und Immanuel Weißglas, ed. Andrei Corbea-Hoisie, George Gutu und Martin A. Hainz. Hartung-Gorre Verlag, Konstanz 2002, ISBN 3-89649-796-0
- Vom Glück sich anzustecken. Möglichkeiten und Risiken im Übersetzungsprozess, ed. Martin A. Hainz. Wien: Braumüller 2005, ISBN 3-7003-1524-4
- Zwischen Sprachen unterwegs, ed. Martin A. Hainz, Edit Király u. Wendelin Schmidt-Dengler. Wien: Praesens Verlag 2006, ISBN 3-7069-0361-X

== Essays (selection) ==
- Cave Carnem. Eros, Macht und Inszenierung in Sacher-Masochs Venus im Pelz. In: arcadia, Bd 39, 2004·1, S.2-26
- Celan und Czernowitz – topographische Überlegungen. In: Südostdeutsche Vierteljahresblätter, Nr 1/2005, S.32-41
- Die Schöpfung – ein Polylog? Zu einem theologisch-poetischen Problem, unter anderem bei und mit Friedrich Gottlieb Klopstock und Ferdinand Schmatz. In: Weimarer Beiträge, Nr 53·1, 2007, S.67-88
- Die Verschärfung des Theodizee-Problems im Denken und in der Literatur des 20. Jahrhunderts. In: Der untote Gott. Religion und Ästhetik in der deutschen und österreichischen Literatur des 20. Jahrhunderts, ed. Olaf Berwald u. Gregor Thuswaldner. Köln, Weimar, Wien: Böhlau Verlag 2007, S.145-158
- »die wirklichkeit bläht sich weiter auf und zerplatzt«. Zu Heimito von Doderer, Oswald Wiener und Franzobel. In: Weimarer Beiträge, Nr 50·4, 2004, S.539-558
- Heritage vs. heretage – Derrida's thinking in the poetry of Friederike Mayröcker. In: Negotiating the Legacy (Gregynog / Aberystwyth University, Jan. 2005)
- Imitation als Poiesis? Ein Orthodoxie-Problem, auch bei Friedrich Gottlieb Klopstock. In: www.literatur-religion.net · diskurs, januar 2006, S.1-11
- Intentio scripturae? Zu Offenbarung und Schrift, bei Klopstock sowie in Derridas Kafka-Lektüre. In: TRANS · Internet-Zeitschrift für Kulturwissenschaften, Nr 16/2005
- »mehr […] als äußere Form« – die Poesie Rose Ausländers und ihre philosophischen Einflüsse. In: Lectures d'une oeuvre – Gedichte de Rose Ausländer, ed. Jacques Lajarrige et Marie-Hélène Quéval. Nantes: éditions du temps 2005, p. 69-82
- Rose Ausländer: A Centenary Appreciation. In: Austrian Studies Newsletter, Nr 14 (2002) · 1, p. 20
- Schrift der Hinfälligkeit. In: Unverloren. Trotz allem. Paul Celan-Symposion Wien 2000, ed. Hubert Gaisbauer, Bernhard Hain u. Erika Schuster. Wien: Mandelbaum Verlag 2000, S.206-242
- Schwarze Milch zu schreiben. Paul Celan und Friederike Mayröcker. In: Weimarer Beiträge, Nr 52·1, 2006, S.5-19
- »Todesfuge« – »Todesorgel«. Zu Paul Celan und Robert Schindel. In: Zeitschrift für deutsche Philologie, Bd 124 · 2/2005, S.227-242
- Trojanisches Pferd, Negativ oder: Günther Anders als falscher Feind Paul Celans. In: arcadia, Bd 38, 2003·1, S.66-76
- Verstehen und Verraten. Versuch über verbindliche Nonkommunikation mit Adorno. In: Études Germaniques, Nr 58 (2003) · 3, S.429-439
- Von der Subtilität des Moralischen – zwei Kantlektüren-Lektüren. In: Wiener Jahrbuch für Philosophie, Bd XXXVI / 2004, S.27-38
- Von Ghettomotiven und ihrem Ungenügen. Zur Gedichtwerkstatt »In Memoriam Paul Celan«. In: »Wörter stellen mir nach / Ich stelle sie vor«. Dokumentation des Ludwigsburger Symposiums 100 Jahre Rose Ausländer, ed. Michael Gans, Roland Jost u. Harald Vogel. Baltmannsweiler: Schneider Verlag Hohengehren 2002 (=Ludwigsburger Hochschulschriften, Bd 23), S.93-101
- Wenn sie schweigen, werden die Steine schreien – zu Manea, Appelfeld und dem Erzählen der Shoah. In: Der Maler Arnold Daghani, ed. Helmut Braun u. Deborah Schultz. Springe: zu Klampen Verlag 2006 (=»Verfolgt – Gezeichnet« · Werke verfolgter Künstler, Bd 1), S.180-191
- »Wer nicht Partei ergreifen kann, der hat zu schweigen«. Gerhard Fritsch, Lektor, Kritiker und Juror. In: Gerhard Fritsch. Schriftsteller in Österreich, ed. Stefan Alker u. Andreas Brandtner. Wien: Sonderzahl, Wiener Stadt- und Landesbibliothek 2005, S.195-203
- Zwischentöne – zwei leise Poesien. In: Studia austriaca, Nr XI, 2003, S.9-27
