= Rolf Bauerdick =

German writer and photographer (born 1957)

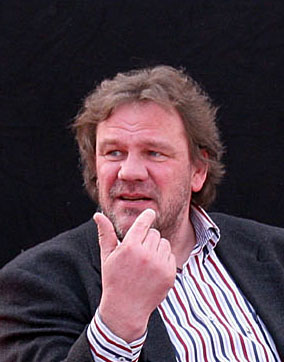
Rolf Bauerdick

Rolf Bauerdick (2 February 1957 – 26 February 2018) was a German writer and photographer. His novel Wie die Madonna auf den Mond kam won the European Book Prize and was translated into English by David Dollenmayer under the title The Madonna on the Moon.

He has also won the Hansel Mieth Prize for his photography.
