= Kupferbach (Tannbach) =

River in Germany

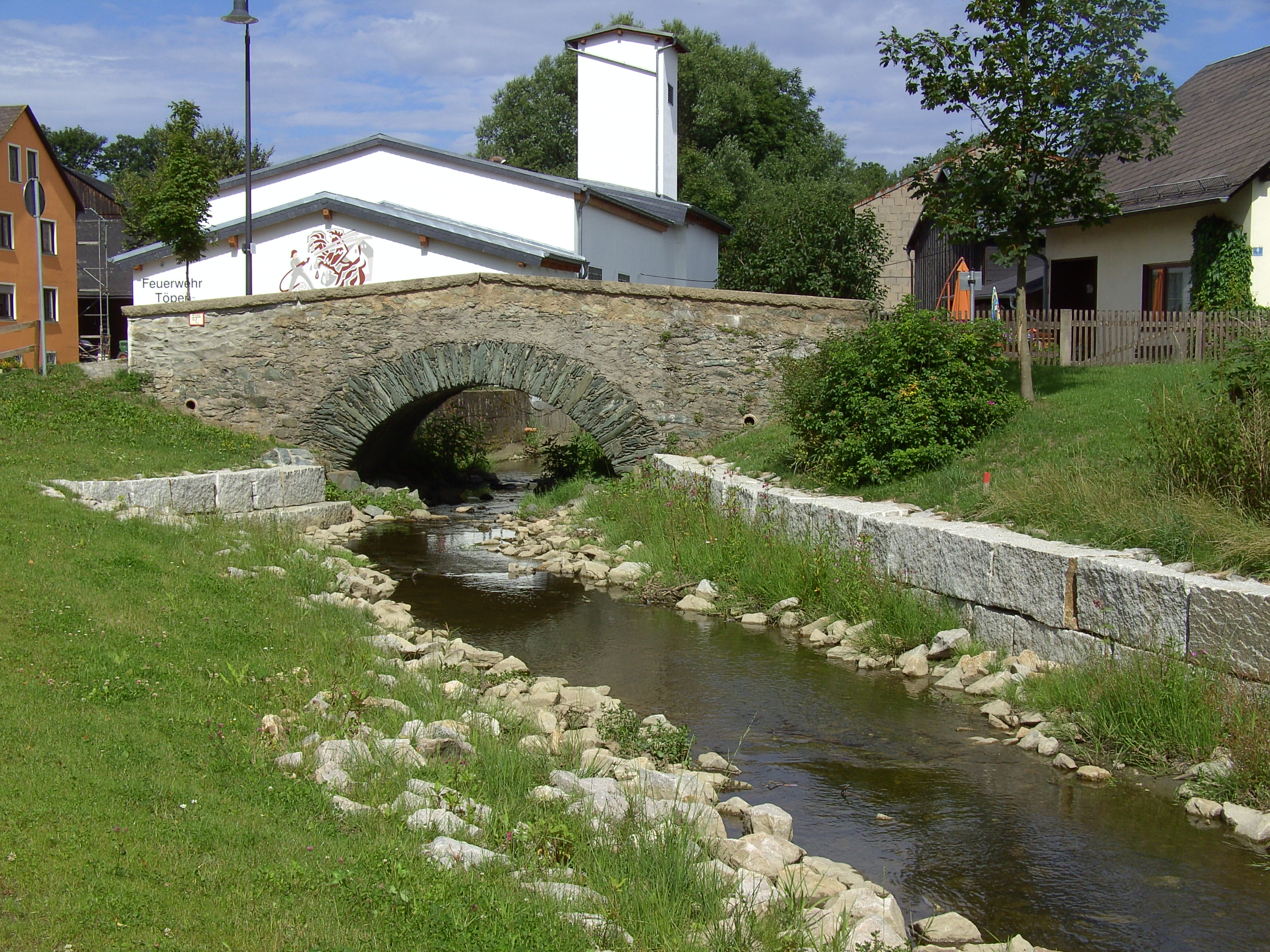
- The Kupferbach in Töpen

Location
- Country: Germany
- States: Thuringia and Bavaria

Physical characteristics
- Mouth
  - location: Tannbach
  - coordinates: 50.3987°N 11.8600°E
- Length: 9.9 km (6.2 mi)

Basin features
- Progression: Tannbach→ Saale→ Elbe→ North Sea

Kupferbach (also: Töpener Bach or Töpenbach) is a river of Thuringia and Bavaria, Germany. It is a tributary of the Tannbach near Töpen.

== See also ==
- List of rivers of Thuringia
- List of rivers of Bavaria
