= Symphony No. 1 (Mahler) =

1887/1888 symphony by Gustav Mahler

- Titan
- by Gustav Mahler
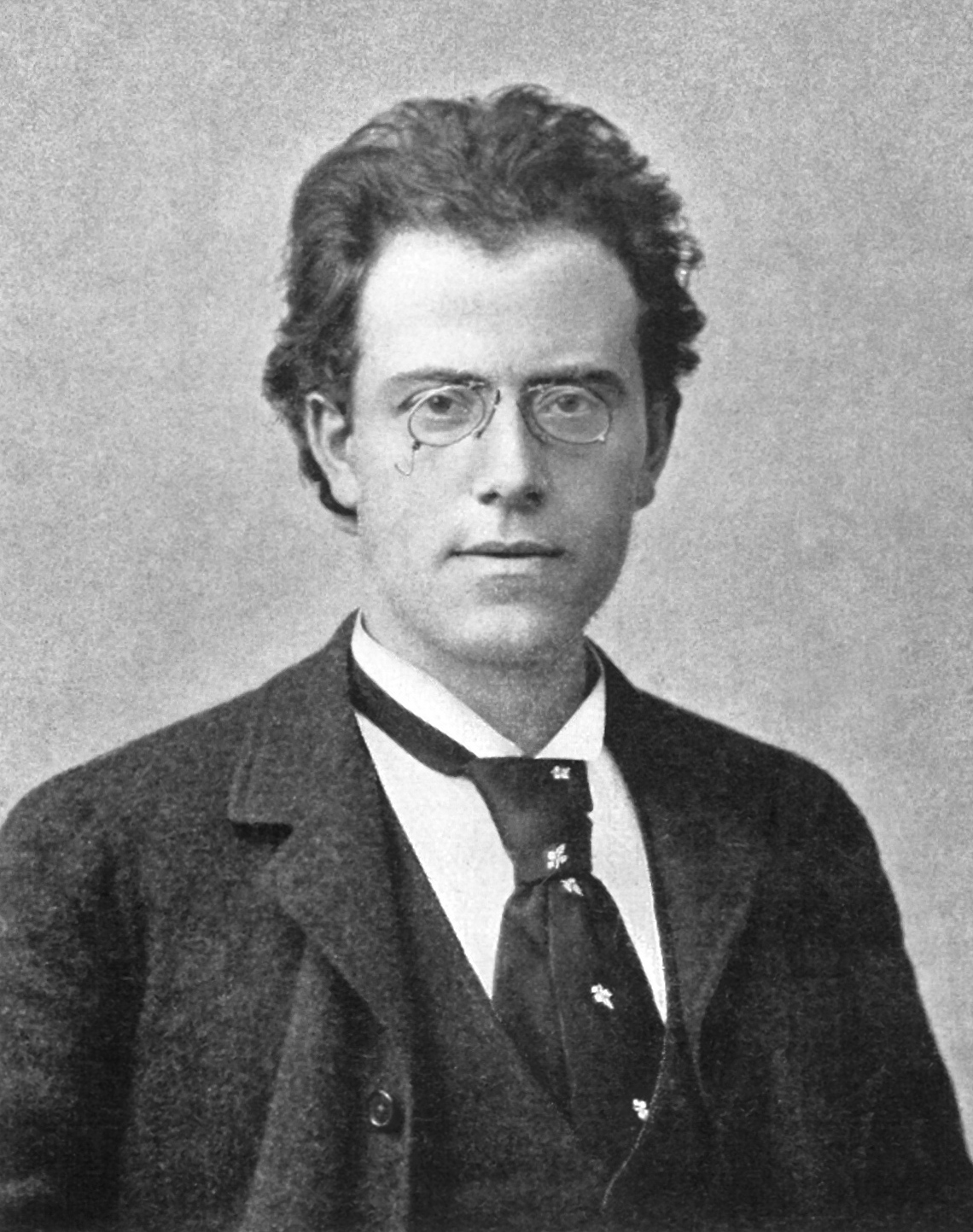
- Mahler at the time of his First Symphony
- Key: D major
- Composed: 1887–1888: Leipzig
- Published: 1898 Josef Weinberger; 1906 Universal Edition; 1967 Universal Edition (critical edition)
- Duration: 1 hour
- Movements: 4

Premiere
- Date: 20 November 1889
- Location: Budapest
- Conductor: Gustav Mahler
- Performers: Budapest Philharmonic Orchestra

The Symphony No. 1 in D major by Gustav Mahler was mainly composed between late 1887 and March 1888, though it incorporates music Mahler had composed for previous works. It was composed while Mahler was second conductor at the Leipzig Opera in Germany. Although in his letters Mahler almost always referred to the work as a symphony, the first two performances described it as a symphonic poem and as a tone poem in symphonic form, respectively. The work was premièred at the Vigadó Concert Hall in Budapest, Hungary, in 1889, but was not well-received. Mahler made some major revisions for the second performance, given at Hamburg, Germany, in October 1893; further alterations were made in the years prior to the first publication, in late 1898. Some modern performances and recordings give the work the title Titan, despite the fact that Mahler only used this label for the second and third performances, and never after the work had reached its definitive four-movement form in 1896.

Mahler conducted more performances of this symphony than of any of his later works.

== Composition ==
The symphony's movements are arranged in a fairly typical four-movement setup. Conventionally, the minuet and trio would be the third movement and the slow movement the second, but Mahler has them switched, which was also sometimes done by Ludwig van Beethoven. The keys are D major for the first movement, A major for the second, D minor for the third, and F minor for the last, with a grand finale at the end in D major. The use of F minor for the last movement was a dramatic break from convention.

For the first three performances (Budapest, Hamburg and Weimar), an additional movement, Blumine (flower piece), was played between the first and second movements of the piece as it now stands. This movement was originally written in June 1884 as the opening piece – "Ein Ständchen am Rhein" – of Mahler's incidental music for a series of seven tableaux vivants based on Joseph Victor von Scheffel's poem Der Trompeter von Säckingen, which, Blumine aside, has since been lost. The addition of this movement appears to have been an afterthought, and Mahler discarded it after the Weimar performance in 1894; it was rediscovered in 1966 by Donald Mitchell. The following year, Benjamin Britten conducted the first performance of it since Mahler's time at the Aldeburgh Festival. The symphony is almost never played with this movement included today, although it is sometimes heard separately. In the 1970s, Eugene Ormandy and the Philadelphia Orchestra made the first recording of the symphony by a major orchestra to include Blumine. Some 20 recordings exist that include Blumine; however, most of them combine it with the revised edition of the other movements, thus making a "blended" version of the symphony that was at no time authorised by Mahler.

Nevertheless, Mahler quotes the main theme from the Blumine movement in two subsequent movements. It appears early in the second movement; he also quotes it in the final movement, as well as other themes from the other movements, which is in keeping with Beethoven's own practice in his Symphony No. 9 of quoting themes from the first, second, and third movements early in the final movement. Beethoven gave the impression of rejecting the earlier themes, after he quotes them, and then introduces the famous "Ode to Joy" theme. The five-movement version generally runs around an hour, just as Mahler's later symphonies (except for Symphony No. 4) are an hour or longer in length. Mahler followed a precedent, established by Beethoven in his ninth symphony and by Anton Bruckner in many of his symphonies, of lengthier, more detailed development of the themes, usually resulting in a performance time of an hour or more.

Under this early five-movement scheme, the work was envisioned by Mahler as a large symphonic poem in two parts, and he wrote a programme to describe the piece, but without adding any further title for the 1889 Budapest première. The first part consisted of the first two movements of the symphony as it is now known plus Blumine, and the second consisted of the funeral-march and finale. For the 1893 Hamburg and 1894 Weimar performances, Mahler gave the piece the title Titan after the novel by Jean Paul, although Mahler specified that the piece was not in any way "about" the book; the nickname is often used today, but properly only applies to those two versions.

The opening of the third movement features a double bass soloist performing a variation on the theme of "Frère Jacques", distinguishing it as one of the few symphonic pieces to use the instrument in such a manner. Mahler uses the song, which he cites as "Bruder Martin", changed from major to minor, thus giving the piece the character of a funeral march. The mode change to minor is not an invention by Mahler, as is often believed, but rather the way this round was sung in the 19th and early 20th century in Austria. A similar use of this mode change to minor is present throughout the second movement of Beethoven's Symphony No. 7.

== Versions ==
There are several manuscripts that document the revisions Mahler made in the work:

1. 1888, Leipzig – The original autograph score, in Mahler's handwriting (location unknown, may no longer exist)
2. 1889, Budapest – The base layer in a copyist's handwriting is probably identical to the original autograph score. Over this, there are many revisions in Mahler's hand, and some whole sections deleted with new replacements added, in preparation for the 1889 Budapest première on 20 November. Bound into two volumes, vol. 1 containing the first movement and Scherzo, vol. 2 containing the last movement; the Blumine and funeral march movements are missing—in fact, conflicting numbering of the Scherzo, and the smaller size of the paper on which Blumine is written, seems to indicate that the Blumine was not originally part of Mahler's conception, and that it was lifted whole from the 1884 Der Trompeter von Säckingen score at some point between the symphony's completion in early 1888 and the Budapest première in late 1889. The entire symphony is scored for the standard symphonic orchestra of the time, with 2 each of all the woodwinds and 4 horns. In this version the piece was called "Symphonic-Poem in 2 Parts". (University of Western Ontario, Rose collection)
3. 1893, Hamburg – The base layer in Mahler's hand corresponds to the final version of the Budapest manuscript, and probably was the manuscript sent by Mahler to Schott as a Stichvorlage (engraver's copy) in 1891 in hopes of publication, and for the first time given a title: Aus dem Leben eines Einsamen (From the Life of a Lonely-one). Over this base layer, there are many revisions and new sections (including to Blumine) added in 1893, in preparation for the second performance, in Hamburg on 27 October. Contains all 5 movements; the funeral march was apparently lifted whole out of the 1889 manuscript. Orchestra has 3 each of the woodwinds. Just before the Hamburg performance, Mahler added the titles from Titan. (Yale University, Osborn collection)
4. 1894?, Hamburg – The base layer in a copyist's handwriting corresponds to the final version of the 1893 manuscript, with further revisions by Mahler. Probably prepared for the third performance, in Weimar on 3 June. Pages containing the Blumine have been folded over, indicating deletion. Orchestra has 4 each of the woodwinds, and 3 additional horns. Still includes the titles from Titan. (New York Public Library, Bruno Walter collection)
5. 1896?, Hamburg – The base layer in a copyist's handwriting, with revisions by Mahler. Probably prepared for 4th performance, in Berlin on 16 March. Contains 4 movements (Blumine not included). Known from this point on as "Symphony No. 1". (Sold at auction by Sotheby's in 1984, currently inaccessible).
6. 1898?, Vienna – In a copyist's handwriting, based on the final version of the 1894? manuscript. This is the Stichvorlage [engraver's copy], used as a basis for the first score published by Weinberger in February 1899. Probably prepared for the 5th performance, in Prague.

An arrangement by Bruno Walter for piano four hands (two players at one piano) was published in 1906.

== Instrumentation ==
The symphony is scored for large orchestra, consisting of the following:

Woodwinds

4 flutes (3rd and 4th doubling piccolos, 2nd doubling piccolo in movements 1 and 4 briefly)
4 oboes (3rd doubling cor anglais, 4th used only in movement 4)
3 B♭, A, C clarinets (3rd doubling bass clarinet and E♭ clarinet)
E♭ clarinet (doubling 4th B♭ clarinet in movement 3 briefly, "doubled at least" in movement 4)
3 bassoons (3rd doubling contrabassoon)
Brass
7 horns
5 trumpets (3 of which offstage in movement 1, 5th used only in movement 4)
4 trombones (4th used only in movement 4)
1 tuba

Percussion
6 timpani (two players, 2nd player appears only in movement 4)
bass drum (with a cymbal attached to be struck by the same player in movement 3)
cymbals (crash and suspended)
triangle
tam-tam
Strings
harp
1st violins
2nd violins
violas
cellos
double basses

In the finale, Mahler states that the first trumpet and E flat clarinet should be doubled in all fortissimo passages.

== Form ==
Mahler's symphony as ultimately published exists in the traditional four-movement form:

1. Langsam, schleppend (Slowly, dragging) Immer sehr gemächlich (very restrained throughout) D major
2. Kräftig bewegt, doch nicht zu schnell (Moving strongly, but not too quickly), Recht gemächlich (restrained), a Trio—a Ländler (folk dance) in A major
3. Feierlich und gemessen, ohne zu schleppen (Solemnly and measured, without dragging), Sehr einfach und schlicht wie eine Volksweise (very simple, like a folk-tune), and Wieder etwas bewegter, wie im Anfang (once again somewhat more agitated, as at the start)—a funeral march based on the children's song "Frère Jacques" (or "Bruder Jacob") D minor
4. Stürmisch bewegt – Energisch (Stormily agitated – Energetic) F minor → D major

The first movement is in modified sonata form. The second is a scherzo and trio based on a Ländler, a traditional Austrian waltz. The third is a slower funeral march with a lyrical central section, and the fourth serves as an expansive finale. Initially, there existed an additional second movement, entitled Blumine, but it was removed by Mahler for the final publication in 1899.

In the first performances, the following program notes were attributed to the symphony:

Part I: From the days of youth, "youth, fruit, and thorn pieces".

1. Spring and no end. This introduction describes the awakening of nature at the earliest dawn.
2. Flowerine Chapter (Andante).
3. Set with full sails (Scherzo).

Part II: Commedia umana (Human Comedy)

1. Stranded. A funeral march in the manner of Callot.
2. Dall'inferno al Paradiso (From Hell to Heaven), as the sudden expression of a deeply wounded heart.

These programmatic notes were dropped starting with the 1896 performance in Berlin, because Mahler did not want the audience to be misled by such notes and their inherent ambiguities.

=== First movement ===
"Spring and no end" – First movement
Performed by the Virtual Philharmonic Orchestra (Reinhold Behringer) with digital samples

The first movement is in a modified sonata form, with a substantially slow introduction in A minor (Phrygian). The introduction begins eerily with a seven-octave drone in the strings on A, with the upper octaves being played on harmonics in the violins. A descending two-note motif is then presented by the woodwinds, and eventually establishes itself into the following repeated pattern:

This opening quotes the fourth movement of Johannes Brahms's Symphony No. 2 in D major, where the first half of this motif repeats several times beginning at bar 234. It also alludes to the first movement of Ludwig van Beethoven's Symphony No. 4 in B♭ major in its descending pattern and minimalist nature. This theme is then interrupted by a fanfare-like material first presented in the clarinets, and later by offstage trumpets, indicated in the score as "In sehr weiter Entfernung aufgestellt" ("placed at a very far distance").

A slow melody is also played by the horns,

and the descending two-note motif is sped up in the clarinet, imitating the sound of a cuckoo.

This opening is very true to Mahler's style, putting the emphasis on the winds, and not more traditionally on the strings.

The mood then lightens to mark the beginning of the exposition, and the descending fourth motif becomes the first theme. This melodic material is recycled from the second of Mahler's Lieder eines fahrenden Gesellen, entitled "Ging heut' Morgen über's Feld" ("I Went This Morning over the Field").

The melody is first presented in the cellos in D major, and passed throughout the orchestra. This melody builds in dynamic, as the music modulates to A major, and a brief second theme, based on a new E–F♯–C♯–F♯–E motif, is presented on the higher woodwinds. A slower development ensues, bringing back material from the introduction, including the drone on A, the cuckoo calls in the clarinet, and the original motif, but modulates through various keys. A new French horn fanfare is issued,

and "development" materials from the first and second themes are heard. The music modulates through A major, then through D♭ major. A♭ major is to be the next, then C major, and finally F major. The retransition of the development section starts in F minor, causing a terrifying darkness. The tension gradually builds up in this section which foreshadows the theme of the fourth movement, ultimately reaching a triumphant cadence in D major. Then the recapitulation begins with a return of the French horn fanfare. Ultimately, the two-note motive takes over the final measures of the recapitulation, and a coda brings the movement to a fiery and humorous close.

=== Second movement ===
Midwest Young Artists' Symphony Orchestra performs Symphony No. 1 in D Major, 2nd mvt. by Gustav Mahler

"Set with full sails" – Second movement
Performed by the Virtual Philharmonic Orchestra (Reinhold Behringer) with digital samples

The second movement is a modified minuet and trio. Mahler replaces the minuet with a ländler, a 3/4 dance-form that was a precursor to the Viennese waltz. This is a frequently used structure in Mahler's other symphonies, as well as Franz Schubert's. One main theme repeats throughout the Ländler, and it gathers energy towards a hectic finish. The main melody outlines an A major chord:

with a secondary subject based on the Blumine melody, but phrased in 3/4 time as opposed to 6/8.

The trio contains contrasting lyrical material.

However, as it comes to a close, Mahler alludes again to the Ländler by interjecting brief rising material from the first section. Finally, the Ländler makes a formal return, shortened and orchestrated more heavily to close the movement.

=== Third movement ===
"Hunter's Funeral" – Third movement
Performed by the Virtual Philharmonic Orchestra (Reinhold Behringer) with digital samples

The third movement, in A–B–A structure, acts as the slow movement in the four-movement plan. The extra-musical idea behind it is that of a hunter's funeral and a procession of animals that follows.

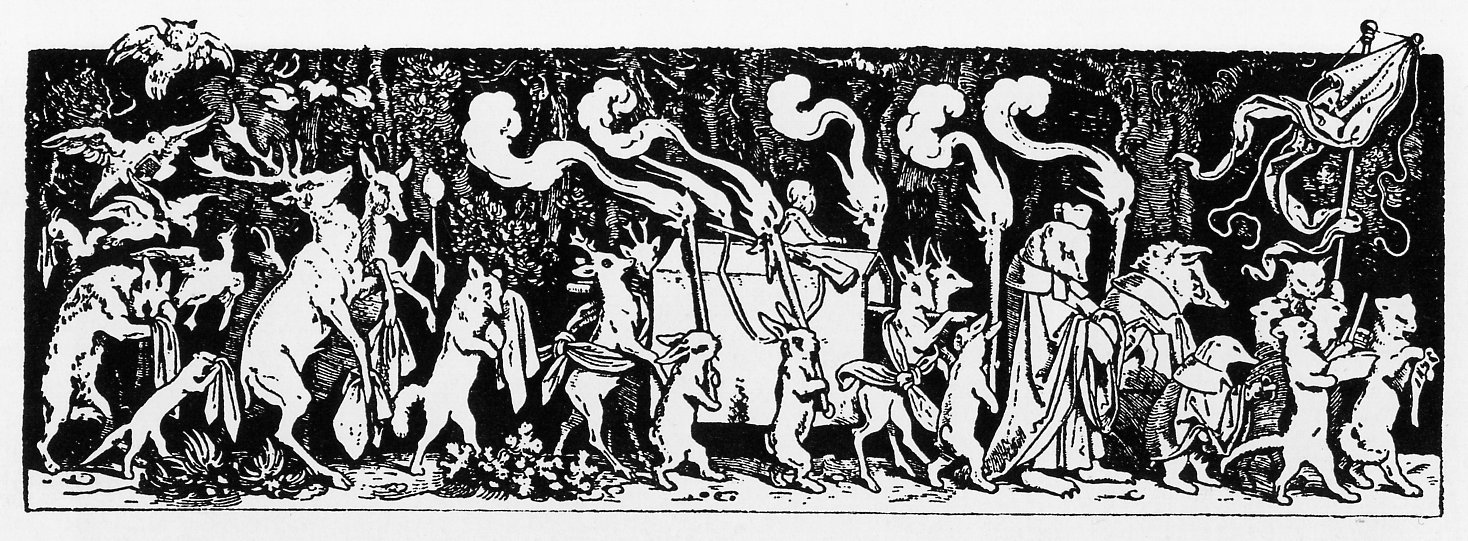
The Hunter's Funeral. This woodcut by Moritz von Schwind (1850) was possibly the inspiration for this 3rd movement of Mahler's Symphony No. 1.

The initial 1st subject of the A section is based on the popular round "Bruder Jakob" (although Mahler calls it "Bruder Martin") more commonly known as "Frère Jacques"; however, Mahler places the melody in a minor mode.

The movement opens with the same falling fourth motif heard in the first movement, presented with the timpani. The subject is first presented by a solo double bass, followed by bassoon, tuba and, eventually, the entire orchestra. A counter-melody is played over top of the canon in the oboe.

The mood changes, and the 2nd subject, one of the most distinctive portions of this symphony follows. Mahler uses cymbal, bass drum, oboes, clarinets and a trumpet duo to produce the sound of a small folk band. Although this melody is often said to be inspired by Klezmer, it is actually inspired by Czech folk music, since what is commonly known as Klezmer was not played in the region in which Mahler lived. Despite this, Mahler's use of klezmer is sometimes credited to his Jewish roots.

After a brief return to the 1st subject, a more contemplative B section, in G major ensues, featuring material from the fourth of Mahler's Lieder eines fahrenden Gesellen, "Die zwei blauen Augen von meinem Schatz" ("The Two Blue Eyes of my Beloved").

After the B section ends, the A section is repeated in a varied form. The 1st subject returns in E♭ minor. Then the 2nd subject is heard again, and after a while, the music modulates back to D minor, and Mahler incorporates all three thematic elements on top of each other. The final few bars of the 2nd subject is heard next, and once again, the 1st subject appears briefly for one last time in D minor, and the movement ends with simple alternating fourth in the lower strings, notably the key motif from the first movement.

=== Fourth movement ===
"Dall'inferno al paradiso" – Fourth movement
Performed by the Virtual Philharmonic Orchestra (Reinhold Behringer) with digital samples

The fourth movement, in sonata-allegro form with a very long and extended development section and a shortened recapitulation, is by far the most involved, and expansive. It brings back several elements from the first movement, unifying the symphony as a whole. The movement's introduction begins with an abrupt cymbal crash, a loud chord in the upper woodwinds, string and brass, and a timpani roll, all in succession. This contrasts greatly with the end of the third movement. As the strings continue in a frenzy of notes, fragments of the first theme of the exposition, in F minor, appear, presented forcefully in the brass, before being played in entirety by the majority of winds:

The movement continues frantically, until a bridge passage on the strings leads to an expansive and lyrical second theme in D♭ major, which is presented in the strings.

Eventually, the closing section of the exposition, over a tonic bass pedal, is heard in D♭ major, and then opening fragments in the brass emerge from the beginning of the development section, and the energy picks up once more. The fast-paced and loud development is only interrupted by a brief quiet section in which a brass fanfare based on the theme appears in C major. After further development of both themes in C minor, a climax is reached in C major, upon which the aforementioned brass fanfare is loudly reintroduced, unexpectedly modulating to D major. The horns then play a full-forced altered version of the descending fourth pattern from the beginning of the symphony:

However, this ultimately leads to a decrescendo, and the momentum sinks to the retransition, bringing back other quotes from the first movement, including fanfares, and "Ging heut' Morgen übers Feld" (see Lieder section). The recapitulation begins with the second theme in F major, with the first theme following it in F minor, heavily featuring the violas. This leads into a restatement of the retransition from the first movement in which the fourth-movement theme was initially foreshadowed, followed by a restatement of the brass fanfare in the development (the start of the coda section), this time starting in D major rather than C major. The above theme is repeated, and this time it does not decrescendo, instead leading to the triumphant ending. The symphony concludes with fanfare material from the beginning, ultimately ending humorously with a quick octave drop.

== Incorporation of German Lied ==
One of the most important marks that Mahler left on the symphony as a genre is the incorporation of another important genre of the 19th century; the German lied. In his first symphony, Mahler borrowed material from his song cycle Lieder eines fahrenden Gesellen, thus innovating the symphonic form and potentially answering questions about programmatic and personal elements in the music.

Although some of Mahler's symphonic predecessors experimented with lyricism in the symphony, Mahler's approach was much more far-reaching. Through the use of the second of his Lieder eines fahrenden Gesellen cycle, "Ging heut' Morgen übers Feld", we can see how the composer manipulates the song's form to accommodate the symphonic form. Within the symphonic movement, the "Ging heut' Morgen" melody is a bright exposition in contrast with the slower and darker introduction. Although the song plays a similar role in the song cycle, being surrounded by darker-themed songs, Mahler changes the order of the strophes as originally found in the song. Of the three verses, the more relaxed third verse is used at the beginning of the exposition, whereas the more chromatic and rhythmically active first and second verses are found in the closing section, helping build the energy to the end of the exposition.

In the third movement of the symphony, the quotation of the lied "Die zwei blauen Augen" demonstrates the subtlety with which Mahler combined the two genres. Within this funeral march, we can see the composer's union of form and meaning, and also elements of a programme. In the last verse of the song cycle, the speaker acknowledges the painlessness of death, saying, "[under the linden tree] I knew not how life fared, [there] all was good again!" This melody is employed as a countermelody to the "Frère Jacques" theme in the minor mode, but the counterpoint that Mahler uses is unconventional, and the two melodies are never properly consolidated. This unresolved counterpoint has been interpreted as a conflict between the "Frère Jacques" theme's Catholic implications and the Jewish klezmer qualities of the "Die zwei blauen Augen" theme, thus alluding to a social conflict of which Mahler was very aware.

== Blumine ==
Blumine – Formerly the second movement of Mahler's Symphony No. 1
Performed by the Virtual Philharmonic Orchestra (Reinhold Behringer) with digital samples and live trumpet (Julius Eiweck)

Blumine is the title of the rejected andante second movement of the symphony. It was first named Blumine in 1893. However it was not discarded until after the first three performances, where it remained the second movement. After the 1894 performance (where it was called Bluminenkapitel), the piece received harsh criticism, especially regarding the second movement. In the Berlin premiere in 1896, Blumine was cut out, along with the title Titan and the programme of the symphony. Shortly after this, the symphony was published without the Blumine movement and in the subsequent versions of the symphony it was gone.

Blumine originates from some incidental music Mahler wrote for Joseph Victor von Scheffel's dramatic poem Der Trompeter von Säckingen. The trumpet serenade was used for Blumine with little change. It was originally scored for a small orchestra and this is how it appears in Blumine, which is in contrast to the large orchestra used in the rest of the symphony. The movement is a short lyrical piece with a gentle trumpet solo, similar to the posthorn solos in Symphony No. 3. Even though it was cut from the symphony, there are still traces of its influence in the rest of the movements.

Blumine translates to "floral", or "flower", and some believe this movement was written for Johanna Richter, with whom Mahler was infatuated at the time. The style of this movement has much in common with Mahler's earlier works but also shows the techniques and distinct style of his later compositions. It was rediscovered by Donald Mitchell in 1966, while doing research for his biography on Mahler in the Osborn Collection at Yale University, in a copy of the Hamburg version of the symphony. Apparently, Mahler had given it to a woman he tutored at the Vienna Conservatory. It was passed on to her son, who then sold it to James Osborn, who then donated it to Yale University.

Benjamin Britten gave the first performance of the reconstructed Hamburg version in 1967, after it had been lost for over seventy years. After this discovery, other people performed this movement, some simply inserting the Blumine into the 1906 version. However, many people did not agree about playing this music as part of the symphony. Mahler had rejected it from his symphony, they reasoned, so it should not be played as part of it. Furthermore, the Blumine movement does not share the other movements' focus on the perfect fourth interval, making it incongruous within the symphony. Famous Mahler conductors such as Leonard Bernstein, Georg Solti and Bernard Haitink never performed it. Others perform Blumine before or after the symphony, while still others have performed it on its own or alongside Mahler's other works.

== Premières ==
- 1889 – 20 November, World première: Budapest, Budapest Philharmonic Orchestra conducted by the composer
- 1893 – 27 October, German première: Hamburg, conducted by the composer
- 1894 – 3 June, Weimar, conducted by the composer
- 1896 – 16 March, Berlin, conducted by the composer
- 1899 – 8 March, Frankfurt, conducted by the composer
- 1898 – 3 March, Czech première: Prague, conducted by the composer
- 1900 – 18 November, Austrian première: Vienna, conducted by the composer
- 1903 – 21 October, English première: London as part of a Proms concert, conducted by Henry Wood
- 1903 – 25 October, Dutch première: Amsterdam, with the composer conducting the Concertgebouw Orchestra.
- 1909 – 16 December, American première: New York City, the New York Philharmonic conducted by the composer

== Published editions ==
- 1899 February, Vienna, Josef Weinberger
- 1906 May, Vienna, Universal Edition
- 1967 Vienna, Universal Edition (1884–1888/1896, critical edition)
- 1992 Vienna, Universal Edition (version 1884–1888/1896, critical edition, revised by Sander Wilkens, UE13820)
- 2019 Wiesbaden, Breitkopf & Härtel (final version 1910, critical edition by Christian Rudolf Riedel)
- 2019 Vienna, Universal Edition (Titan 1888–1889/1894, critical edition by Reinhold Kubik and Stephen E. Hefling
