= Mihail Kogălniceanu National College =

- Colegiul Național "Mihail Kogălniceanu"

Location
- Strada Brăilei, Nr. 161B; Galați, Galați County; Romania
- Coordinates: 45.4271°N 28.0341°E

Information
- Funding type: Public
- Established: 1878; 148 years ago
- Status: Open
- Category: Middle School and High School
- Principal: Mădălina Popescu
- Grades: 5 to 12
- Gender: coeducation
- Age range: 11–19
- Language: Romanian
- Hours in school day: 5–7
- Campus type: Urban
- Website: cnmkgl.ro

Mihail Kogălniceanu National College (Romanian: Colegiul Național "Mihail Kogălniceanu") is a public day high school in Galați, Romania, located at 161B Brăilei Street.

Established as an all-girls high school in 1878, it became coeducational over time. Since 2012, the school has also been offering middle school education.

== Alumni ==
- George Guțu, philologist
- Ionuț-Florin Pucheanu, mayor of Galați since 2016
- Florin Ristei, singer
- Teodor Vișan, painter
