= Clarissa Stadler =

Austrian journalist, moderator and writer

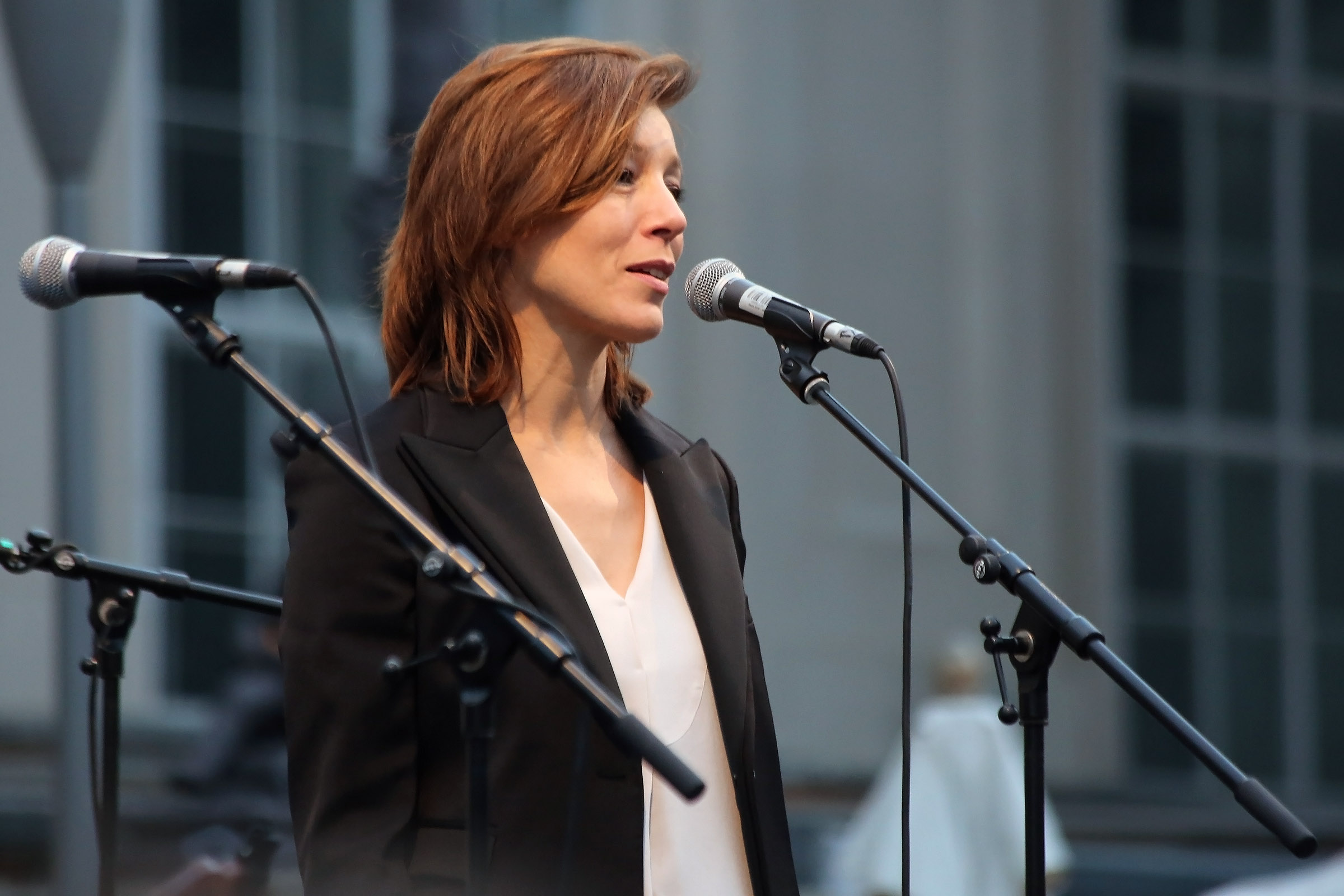
- Stadler in 2013
- Born: 1966 (age 59–60); Vienna, Austria
- Occupations: Journalist; moderator; writer
- Awards: See Awards

Clarissa Stadler (born 1966) is an Austrian journalist, moderator and writer.

== Life and career ==
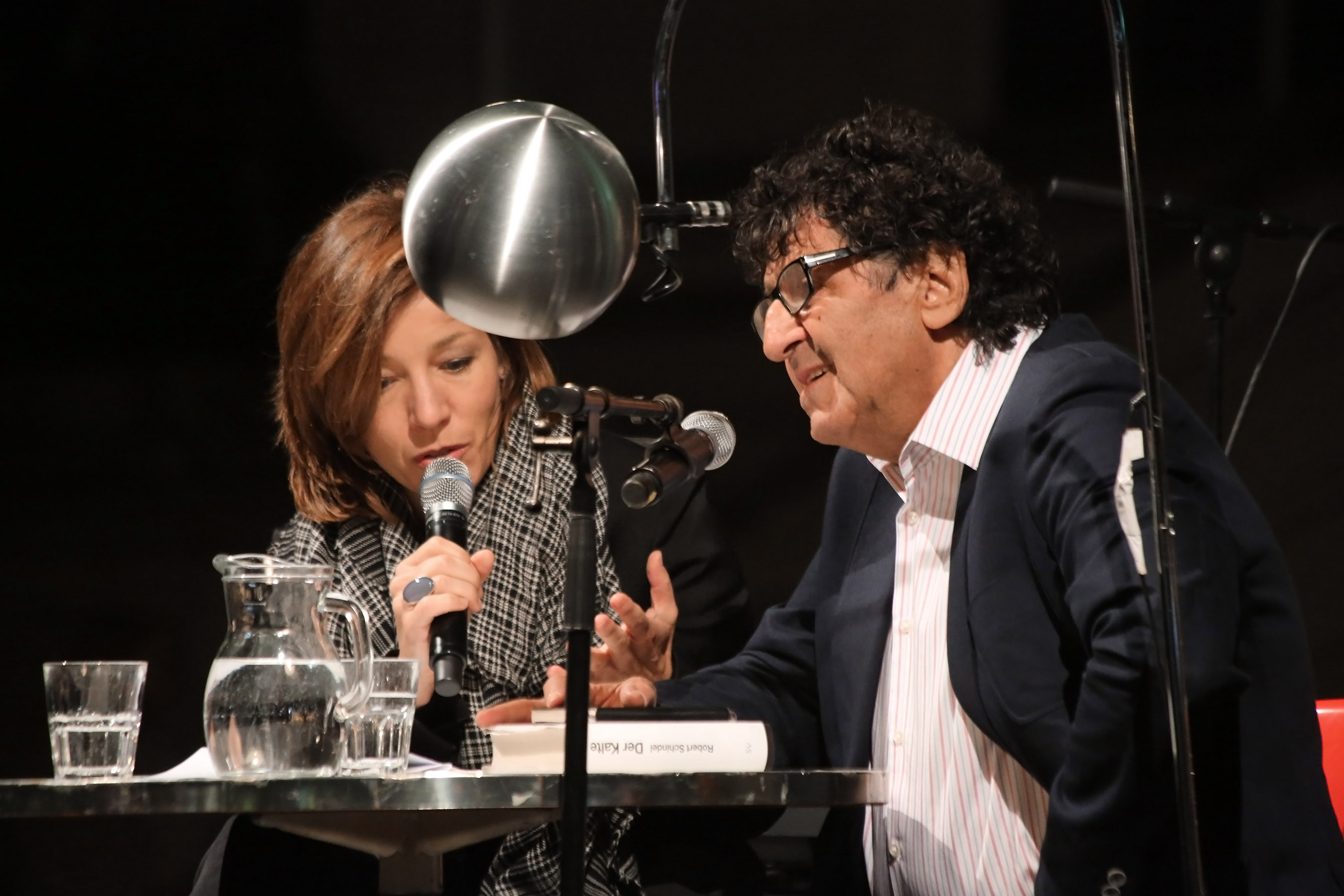
Stadler (left) with Robert Schindel at o-töne in 2013

Clarissa Stadler was born in 1966 in Vienna, Austria and grew up in Austria, Germany and Belgium and studied commercial science. From 1990 she wrote texts and articles for Der Standard and the weekly newspaper Falter as well as for other domestic and foreign media. She began her career at ORF in the Salzburg regional studio and later worked in the editorial department of the Ö3 radio show Die Musicbox. She then did a television internship at the Franco-German cultural broadcaster Arte.

Stadler has worked for the ORF television culture department since March 1997, including as a culture presenter for Zeit im Bild from March 1999 to April 2007 and in 2003 as the presenter of the cultural program karls.platz.

In 2000 Clarissa Stadler married the television journalist Robert Hochner, who died on 12 June 2001.

In 2005 she made her writing debut with the novel N. Eine kleine Utopie (N. A little Utopia). From 2009 to 2012 she moderated the Ingeborg Bachmann Prize; from 2010 she presented this event in Klagenfurt on 3sat.

Since February 2021 she has been presenting Kulturmontag alternately with Peter Schneeberger.

== Awards ==
- Journalist des Jahres (Journalist of the Year) in the category Kultur (culture)
