= Siebenkäs =

1796/1797 novel by Jean Paul

Blumen-, Frucht- und Dornenstücke oder Ehestand, Tod und Hochzeit des Armenadvokaten F. St. Siebenkäs im Reichsmarktflecken Kuhschnappel (lit. 'Flower, Fruit, and Thorn Pieces; or, the Married Life, Death, and Wedding of the Public Defender F. St. Siebenkäs in Reichsmarktflecken, Kuhschnappel'), better known simply as Siebenkäs (lit. 'Sevencheese'), is a German Romantic novel by Jean Paul, published in Berlin in three volumes between 1796 and 1797.

== Plot ==
As the title suggests, the story concerns the life of Firmian Stanislaus Siebenkäs and is told in a comedic style. Unhappily married, Siebenkäs goes to consult his friend, Leibgeber (Bodygiver), who, in reality, is his alter ego, or Doppelgänger. Leibgeber convinces Siebenkäs to fake his own death, in order to begin a new life. Siebenkäs takes the advice of his alter ego, and soon meets the beautiful Natalie. The two fall in love; hence, the "wedding after death" noted in the title.

== Trivia ==
Siebenkäs is the first novel in which a lookalike is described as a "Doppelgänger". It is a word of Jean Paul's own invention (originally spelled as "Doppeltgänger").

The sudden meeting of satire (in Jean Paul's description of life in a little town) and touching moments (in his poignant drawing of Siebenkäs' psychological pains) moves the reader to want to know about philosophical honesty as well as comfort of soul. The inconsistency and being torn apart of Siebenkäs is programmatic, and still today a sign of sensitivities of bourgeois individuals.
