= Hans Bergel =

Transylvanian German writer and historian (1925–2022)

- Born: June 26, 1925; Râșnov, Brașov County, Transylvania, Kingdom of Romania
- Died: February 26, 2022 (aged 96)

Hans Bergel (June 26, 1925 – February 26, 2022) was a German-language writer, historian, and journalist originally from Râșnov, Romania. He is known for his works reflecting the struggles of Transylvanian Germans under communist rule. He won the prestigious Andreas Gryphius Prize in 2013 for his contributions to German literature.
