= Jean Paul =

German Romantic writer (1763–1825)

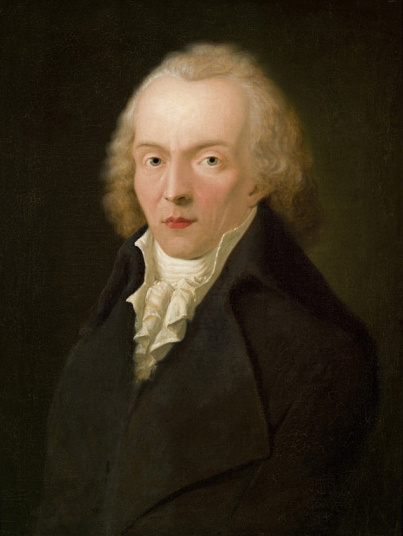
- Portrait by Heinrich Pfenninger, 1798
- Born: Johann Paul Friedrich Richter; 21 March 1763; Wunsiedel, Principality of Bayreuth, Holy Roman Empire
- Died: 14 November 1825 (aged 62); Bayreuth, Kingdom of Bavaria, German Confederation
- Education: University of Leipzig
- Occupation: Novelist
- Writing career
- Pen name: "J. P. F. Hasus"
- Period: 1783–1825
- Genres: Humorous novels and stories
- Subjects: Education; politics
- Notable awards: PhD (Hon): University of Heidelberg (1817)
- Movement: German Romanticism

Jean Paul (German: [ʒɑ̃ paʊl]; born Johann Paul Friedrich Richter, 21 March 1763 – 14 November 1825) was a German Romantic writer, best known for his humorous novels and stories.

== Life and work ==
Jean Paul was born at Wunsiedel, then under the Principality of Bayreuth, in the Fichtel Mountains (Franconia). His father was an organist at Wunsiedel. In 1765 his father became a Lutheran pastor at Joditz near Hof and, in 1767 at Schwarzenbach, but he died on 25 April 1779, leaving the family in great poverty. Later in life, Jean Paul noted, "The words that a father speaks to his children in the privacy of home are not heard by the world, but as in whispering-galleries, they are clearly heard at the end and by posterity." After attending the Gymnasium at Hof, in 1781 Jean Paul went to the University of Leipzig. His original intention was to enter his father's profession, but theology did not interest him, and he soon devoted himself wholly to the study of literature. Unable to maintain himself at Leipzig he returned in 1784 to Hof, where he lived with his mother. From 1787 to 1789, he served as a tutor at Töpen, a village near Hof; and from 1790 to 1794, he taught the children of several families in a school he had founded in nearby Schwarzenbach.

Jean Paul began his career as a man of letters with Grönländische Prozesse ("Greenland Lawsuits"), published anonymously in Berlin in 1783–84, and Auswahl aus des Teufels Papieren ("Selections from the Devil's Papers", signed "J. P. F. Hasus"), published in 1789. These works were not received with much favour, and in later life even their author had little sympathy for their satirical tone.

Jean Paul's outlook was profoundly altered by a spiritual crisis he suffered on 15 November 1790, in which he had a vision of his own death. His next book, Die unsichtbare Loge ("The Invisible Lodge"), a romance published in 1793 under the pen-name Jean Paul (in honour of Jean-Jacques Rousseau), had all the qualities that were soon to make him famous, and its power was immediately recognized by some of the best critics of the day.

Encouraged by the reception of Die unsichtbare Loge, Richter composed a number of books in rapid succession: Leben des vergnügten Schulmeisterleins Maria Wutz in Auenthal ("Life of the Cheerful Schoolmaster Maria Wutz", 1793), the best-selling Hesperus (1795), which made him famous, Biographische Belustigungen unter der Gehirnschale einer Riesin ("Biographical Recreations under the Brainpan of a Giantess", 1796), Leben des Quintus Fixlein ("Life of Quintus Fixlein", 1796), Der Jubelsenior ("The Parson in Jubilee", 1797), and Das Kampaner Tal ("The Valley of Campan", 1797). Also among these was the novel Siebenkäs in 1796–97.

Siebenkäs' slightly supernatural theme, involving a Doppelgänger and pseudocide, stirred some controversy over its interpretation of the Resurrection, but these criticisms served only to draw awareness to the author. This series of writings assured Richter a place in German literature, and during the rest of his life every work he produced was welcomed by a wide circle of admirers.

After his mother's death in 1797, Richter went to Leipzig, and in the following year, to Weimar, where he started work on his most ambitious novel, Titan, published between 1800 and 1803. Richter became friends with such Weimar notables as Johann Gottfried Herder, by whom he was warmly appreciated, but despite their close proximity, Richter never became close to Johann Wolfgang von Goethe or Friedrich Schiller, both of whom found his literary methods repugnant; but in Weimar, as elsewhere, his remarkable conversational powers and his genial manners made him a favorite in general society. The British writers Thomas Carlyle and Thomas De Quincey took an interest in Jean Paul's work.

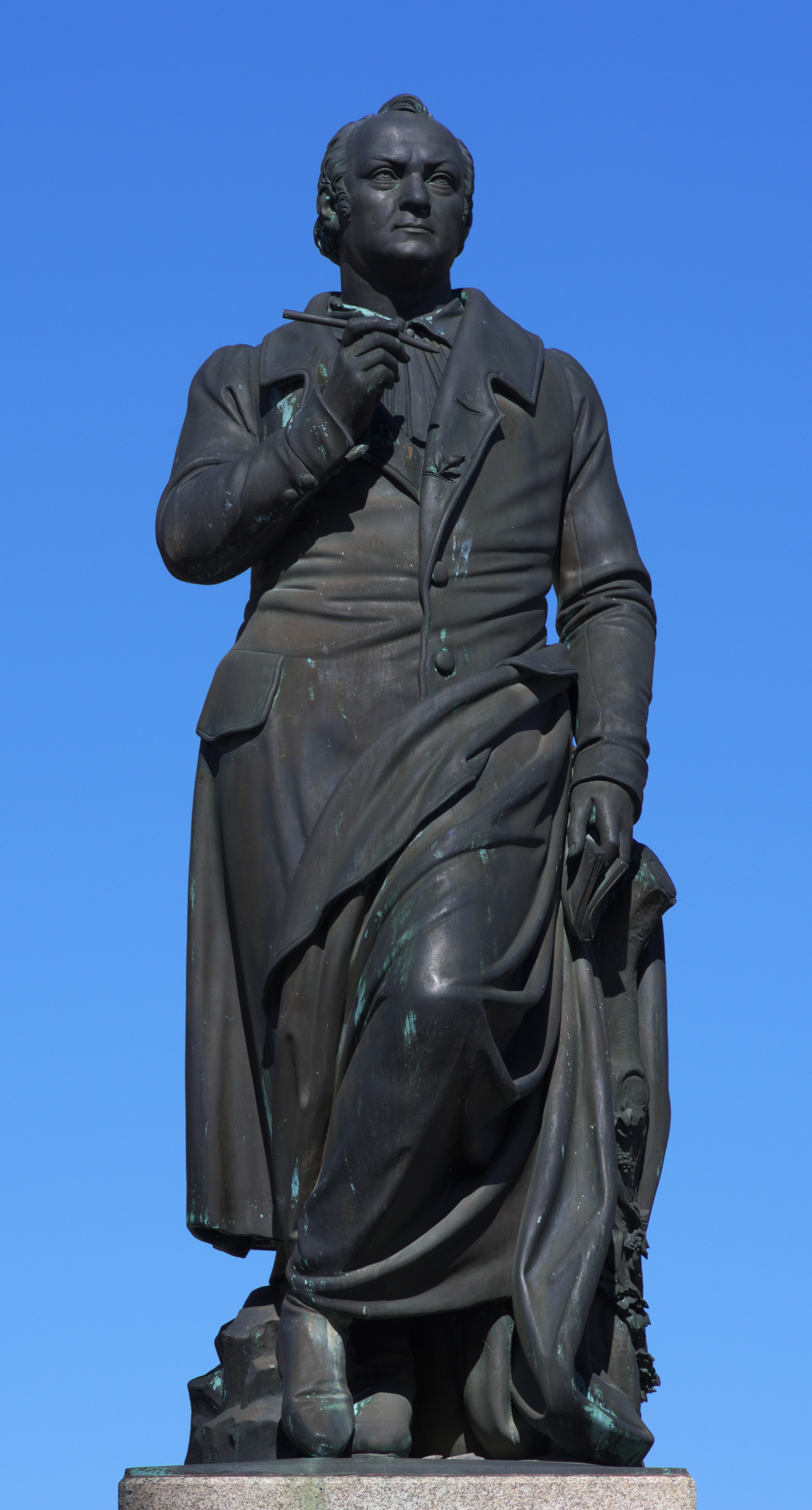
The Jean Paul monument in Bayreuth, created by Ludwig von Schwanthaler and unveiled in 1841 on the 16th anniversary of Richter's death

In 1801, he married Caroline Meyer, whom he had met in Berlin the year before. They lived first at Meiningen, then at Coburg; and finally, in 1804, they settled at Bayreuth. Here Richter spent a quiet, simple, and happy life, constantly occupied with his work as a writer. In 1808 he was delivered from anxiety about outward necessities by Prince-Primate Karl Theodor von Dalberg, who gave him an annual pension of 1,000 florins, which was later continued by the king of Bavaria.

Jean Paul's Titan was followed by Flegeljahre ("The Awkward Age", 1804–5). His later imaginative works were Dr Katzenbergers Badereise ("Dr Katzenberger's Trip to the Medicinal Springs", 1809), Des Feldpredigers Schmelzle Reise nach Flätz ("Army Chaplain Schmelzle's Voyage to Flätz", 1809), Leben Fibels ("Life of Fibel", 1812), and Der Komet, oder Nikolaus Marggraf ("The Comet, or, Nikolaus Markgraf", 1820–22). In Vorschule der Aesthetik ("Introduction to Aesthetics", 1804) he expounded his ideas on art; he discussed the principles of education in Levana, oder Erziehlehre ("Levana, or, Pedagogy", 1807); and the opinions suggested by current events he set forth in Friedenspredigt ("Peace Sermon", 1808), Dämmerungen für Deutschland ("Twilights for Germany", 1809), Mars und Phöbus Thronwechsel im J. 1814; eine scherzhafte Flugschrift ("Mars and Phoebus Exchange Thrones in the Year 1814; a Comic Pamphlet", 1814), and Politische Fastenpredigten ("Political Lenten Sermons", 1817). In his last years he began Wahrheit aus Jean Pauls Leben ("The Truth from Jean Paul's Life"), to which additions from his papers and other sources were made after his death by C. Otto and E. Förster.

Also during this time he supported the younger writer E. T. A. Hoffmann, who long counted Richter among his influences. Richter wrote the preface to Fantasy Pieces, a collection of Hoffmann's short stories published in 1814.

In September 1821 Jean Paul lost his only son, Max, a youth of the highest promise; and he never quite recovered from this shock. He lost his sight in 1824, and died of dropsy at Bayreuth, on 14 November 1825.

== Characteristics of his work ==
Jean Paul occupies an unusual position in German literature and has always divided the literary public. Some hold him in highest veneration while others treat his work with indifference. He took the Romantic formlessness of the novel to extremes: Schlegel called his novels soliloquies, in which he makes his readers take part (in this respect going even further than Laurence Sterne in Tristram Shandy). Jean Paul habitually played with a multitude of droll and bizarre ideas: his work is characterized by wild metaphors as well as by digressive and partly labyrinthine plots. He mixed contemplation with literary theory: alongside spirited irony the reader finds bitter satire and mild humour; next to soberly realistic passages there are romanticized and often ironically curtailed idylls, social commentary and political statements. The quick changes of mood attracted the composer Schumann whose Papillons was inspired by Jean Paul's Flegeljahre.

His novels were especially admired by women. This was due to the empathy with which Jean Paul created the female characters in his works: never before in German literature were women represented with such psychological depth. At the same time however, his work contains misogynistic quips. Jean Paul's character may have been as diverse and as confusing as many of his novels: he was said to be very sociable and witty, while at the same time extremely sentimental: having an almost childlike nature, quickly moved to tears. It is obvious from his works that his interests encompassed not only literature but also astronomy and other sciences.

Paul's relationship with the Weimar classicists Goethe and Schiller always remained ambivalent: Schiller once remarked that Jean Paul was as alien to him as someone who fell from the Moon, and that he might have been worthy of admiration "if he had made as good use of his riches as other men made of their poverty." Herder and Wieland on the other hand fully appreciated his work and supported him. Although he always kept his distance from the classicists, who wanted to "absolutize" art, and although his theoretical approach (most notably in his Introduction to Aesthetics) was considerably influenced by Romanticism, it would be misleading to call him a Romantic without qualification. Here too he kept his distance: with all his subjectivism he didn't absolutize the subject of the author as the Romantics often did. Jean Paul had what had become rare amidst classical severity and romantic irony: humour. He also was one of the first who approached humour from a theoretical standpoint.

He thought that both the Enlightenment and metaphysics had failed, though they still held importance for his worldview. He arrived at a philosophy without illusions, and a state of humorous resignation. Correspondingly he was one of the first defenders of Schopenhauer's philosophy. He didn't try to indoctrinate, but to portray human happiness, even (and especially) in an increasingly alienated environment — the rococo castles and seemingly-bleak villages of Upper Franconia. Jean Paul was not only the first to use and name the literary motif of the Doppelgänger, he also utilised it in countless variations (e.g. Siebenkäs and Leibgeber, Liane and Idoine, Roquairol and Albano). In his novel Siebenkäs he coined the word Doppelgänger, which he defined as the "people who see themselves."

Jean Paul was a lifelong defender of freedom of the press and his campaigns against censorship went beyond many of his contemporaries. In his Freiheitsbüchlein (1805), he maintains that books belong to humanity and should have the chance to have an impact on all times, not just the present moment, and therefore preventing a book from being published renders the censor a judge not just for contemporary society but for all future societies. Censorship is not feasible because it would be impossible to find a person able to fulfill the true requirements of the office. After the great achievements of the eighteenth century, the prospect of complete freedom of opinion, speech, and printing was real. Even under the tightened conditions of the Napoleonic occupation, Jean Paul continued to speak out in favor of reason, as in his Friedens-Predigt an Deutschland (1808). The last section of his Politische Fastenpredigten (1816) contains a warning to rulers that minds cannot be controlled, and that police action will only cause them to eventually explode like a champagne bottle.

== Other ==
Rudolf Steiner edited a multi-volume collection of the works of Jean Paul. In published lectures, Steiner often mentioned the realization by the 7-year-old Jean Paul that he was an individual "Ego", expressed in Paul's surprise at understanding that "I am an I".

== Quotations ==
- The long sleep of death closes our scars, and the short sleep of life our wounds. (Der lange Schlaf des Todes schliesst unsere Narben zu, und der kurze des Lebens unsere Wunden, Hesperus, XX).

== Works ==
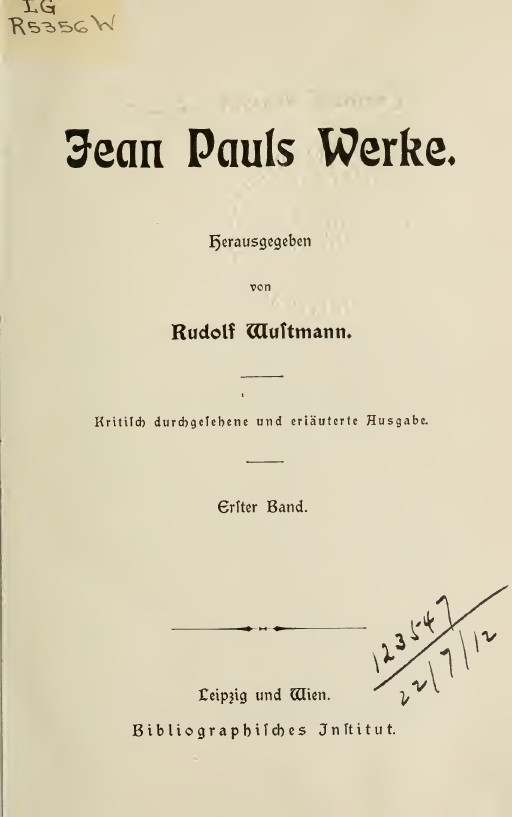
Titan. 1

- Abelard und Heloise 1781
- Grönländische Prozesse 1783–1784
- Auswahl aus des Teufels Papieren 1789
- Leben des vergnügten Schulmeisterlein Maria Wutz in Auenthal. Eine Art Idylle 1790
- Die unsichtbare Loge 1793
- Hesperus 1795
- Biographische Belustigungen 1796
- Leben des Quintus Fixlein 1796
- Siebenkäs 1796–1797
- Der Jubelsenior 1797
- Das Kampaner Tal 1797
- Konjekturalbiographie 1798
- Des Luftschiffers Giannozzo Seebuch 1801
- Titan 1800–03
- Vorschule der Aesthetik 1804
- Flegeljahre (unfinished) 1804–05
- Freiheitsbüchlein 1805
- Levana oder Erziehlehre 1807
- Dr. Katzenbergers Badereise 1809
- Des Feldpredigers Schmelzle Reise nach Flätz 1809
- Leben Fibels 1812
- Bemerkungen über uns närrische Menschen
- Clavis Fichtiana (see also Johann Gottlieb Fichte)
- Das heimliche Klaglied der jetzigen Männer
- Der Komet 1820–1822
- Der Maschinenmann
- Die wunderbare Gesellschaft in der Neujahrsnacht
- Freiheits-Büchlein
- Selberlebenbeschreibung posthum 1826
- Selina posthum 1827

=== English translations ===
Most of Richter's long novels were translated into English during the mid-nineteenth century. Several editions of translated passages from various works were also published. In the twenty-first century, Sublunary Editions of Seattle began publishing more English translations of his works (see final entries below).

- The Invisible Lodge, trans. Charles T. Brooks, New York: Holt 1883 | Project Gutenberg
- Maria Wutz (various editions)
  - Maria Wuz, trans. Francis and Rose Storr, Maria Wuz and Lorenz Stark, London: Longmans, Green, & Co, 1881
  - Maria Wutz, trans. John D. Grayson, 19th Century German Tales, ed. Angel Flores, 1959, reissued 1966
  - Maria Wutz, trans. Erika Casey, The Jean Paul Reader, Johns Hopkins U, 1990
  - Maria Wutz, trans. Francis and Rose Storr and Ruth Martin, Sublunary Editions, 2021
- Hesperus, trans. Charles T. Brooks, 1864 | At Project Gutenberg: Vol. 1; Vol. 2
- Siebenkäs
  - Flower, Fruit, and Thorn Pieces, trans. Edward Henry Noel, London: William Smith, 1845; Boston: Ticknor and Fields, 1845
  - Flower, Fruit, and Thorn Pieces, trans. Alexander Ewing, 1877 | Project Gutenberg
- The Campaner Thal: or, Discourses on the Immortality of the Soul, trans. Juliette Bauer, 1848 | Project Gutenberg
- Life of Quintus Fixlein and Army Chaplain Schmelzle's Journey to Flaetz, trans. Thomas Carlyle, 1827 | Project Gutenberg
- Titan, trans. Charles T. Brooks (London, 1863; Boston, 1864) | At Project Gutenberg: Vol. 1; Vol. 2
- Horn of Oberon: Jean Paul Richter's School for Aesthetics, trans. Margaret R Hale, Wayne State UP, 1973
- Walt and Vult [Flegeljahre] trans. Eliza Lee, 1846
- Levana; or, the Doctrine of Education, trans. "A. H.", 1848, 1863, 1880, 1886, 1890
- The Death of an Angel & Other Pieces, 1839
- Reminiscences of the Best Hours of Life for the Hour of Death, trans. Joseph Dowe, 1841
- Prefaces, various translators. Sublunary Editions, 2022.
- Biographical Recreations from the Cranium of a Giantess, trans. Genese Grill & anonymous, Sublunary Editions, 2023
- Two Stories, trans. Alexander Booth and Matthew Spencer. Sublunary Editions, 2023 ("The Wondrous New Year's Eve Company" and "The Night Thoughts of Obstetrician Walther Vierneissel on His Lost Fetus-Ideal"
- Logbook of Giannozzo the Balloonist, trans. David Dollenmayer, Sublunary Editions 2024

== Musical reception (selection) ==
- Robert Schumann: Papillons pour le pianoforte seul, 1832.
- Johann Friedrich Kittl: Wär' ich ein Stern, 1838.
- Robert Schumann: Blumenstück, 1839.
- Carl Grünbaum: Lied (Es zieht in schöner Nacht der Sternenhimmel), 1840.
- Ernst Friedrich Kauffmann: Ständchen nach Jean Paul, 1848.
- Carl Reinecke: O wär' ich ein Stern (from: Flegeljahre), 1850.
- Stephen Heller: Blumen-, Frucht- und Dornenstücke (Nuits blanches), 1850.
- Marta von Sabinin: O wär ich ein Stern, 1855.
- Ernst Methfessel: An Wina, 1866.
- Gustav Mahler: Symphony No. 1 "Titan", 1889.
- Ferdinand Heinrich Thieriot: Leben und Sterben des vergnügten Schulmeisterlein Wuz, 1900.
- Hugo Leichtentritt: Grabschrift des Zephyrs, 1910.
- Henri Sauguet: Polymetres, 1936.
- Eduard Künnecke: Flegeljahre, 1937.
- Karl Kraft: Fünf kleine Gesänge auf Verse des Jean Paul für Singstimme und Klavier, 1960.
- Walter Zimmermann: Glockenspiel für einen Schlagzeuger, 1983.
- Wolfgang Rihm: Andere Schatten (from: Siebenkäs), 1985.
- Oskar Sala: Rede des toten Christus vom Weltgebäude herab, dass kein Gott sei, 1990.
- Iván Erőd: Blumenstück für Viola solo, 1995.
- Thomas Beimel: Idyllen, 1998/99.
- Christoph Weinhart: Albanos Traum, 2006.
- Georg Friedrich Haas: Blumenstück (from: Siebenkäs), 2009.
- Ludger Stühlmeyer: Zum Engel der letzten Stunde (from: Das Leben des Quintus Fixlein), 2013.
- Ludger Stühlmeyer: Wär’ ich ein Stern (from: Flegeljahre), 2025.
