= Joditz =

- Village of Köditz
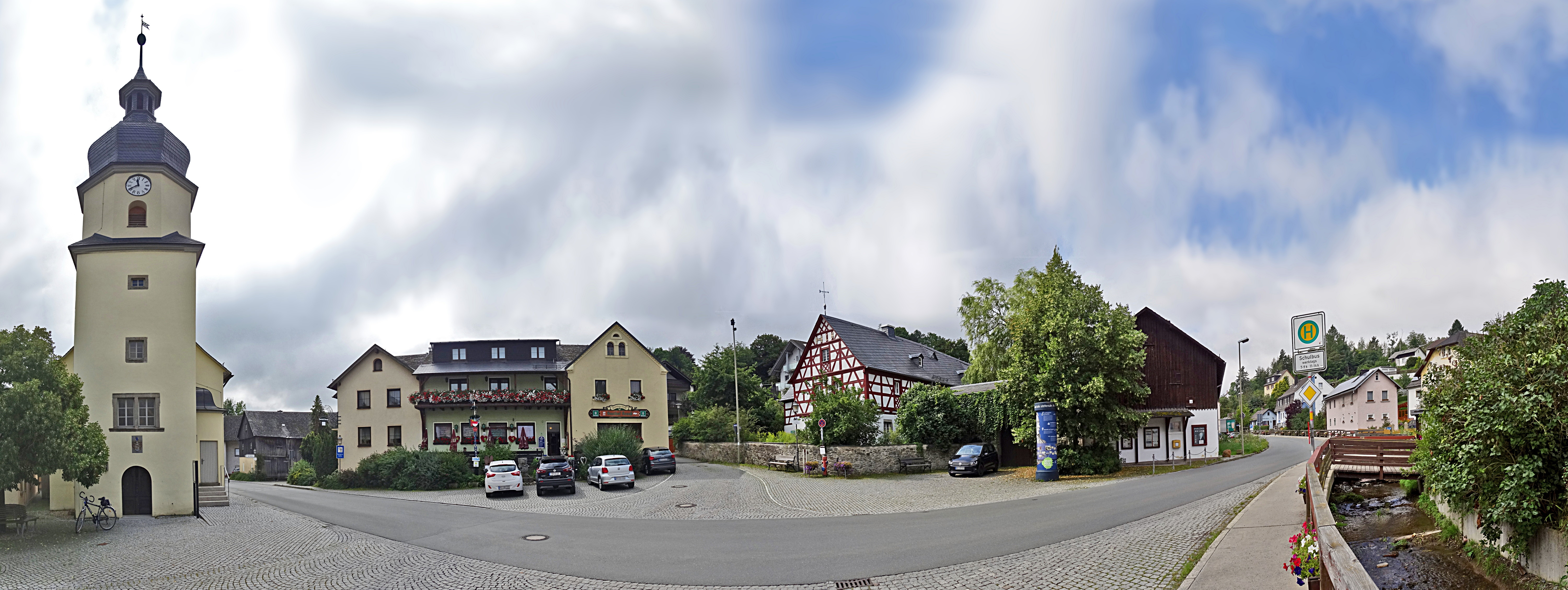
- Interactive map of Joditz
- Location within Germany Location within Bavaria
- Coordinates: 50°22′N 11°50′E
- Country: Germany
- State: Bavaria
- Admin. region: Upper Franconia
- District: Hof
- Municipality: Köditz

Population
  - Total: 345
- Time zone: UTC+01:00 (CET)
  - Summer (DST): UTC+02:00 (CEST)

Joditz is a village in Upper Franconia, in the municipality of Köditz and the district of Hof.

Joditz lies in the valley of the Saale, ten kilometers north-west of the town of Hof. The village has 345 inhabitants (as of January 2010) and contains a parish church. The area of the parish includes the hamlets Joditz, Lamitz, Saalenstein, Scharten, Stöckaten and Siebenhitz.

At the centre of the village is St John's Evangelical Lutheran Church. It was first mentioned in 1365 and has been the parish church since 1561. The present structure was built in 1704. The pulpit, altar, organ case and baptismal font (the last no longer extant) were by the Hof sculptor Johann Knoll. The altarpiece depicts the birth of Christ, and is flanked by statues of Moses and John the Baptist. The altar is surmounted by three cherubs with the arms of the former patron families, and the pulpit is decorated with figures of the four evangelists. The church was renovated in 2002/2003.

== Jean Paul ==
Joditz was the childhood home of the Wunsiedel-born writer Jean Paul, whose father was pastor from 1765 to 1776. In his autobiography he described the importance of the small town in his upbringing and his later literary work; he tells not only of his childhood joys, but also of the great superstitious fears he harboured, such as the fear of village ghosts.

Let not the poet place his birth and first years in a capital city, but wherever possible in a village, or at greatest a little town. The abundance and over-stimulation of a large city are, to the weak and excitable soul of a child, a meal made out of dessert, a drink of aqua ardens, and a bath of mulled wine.

The character of the village schoolteacher Maria Wutz of Auenthal (in Jean Paul's eponymous idyll) is thought to be based on an inhabitant of Joditz.

The Jean Paul Museum in Joditz keeps the memory of the writer and his childhood spent in Upper Franconia. In an idyllic rural setting, which includes the old rectory garden, the visitor can examine manuscripts, early prints, first editions, engravings, drawings and other documents. The museum is a private initiative, run by Eberhard and Karen Schmidt.

== Bibliography ==
- August Gebessler. Stadt und Landkreis Hof, München 1960. S.43-45.
- Die Johannes-Kirche zu Joditz. Joditz 2000.
- Jean Paul. Selberlebensbeschreibung. In: Werke in 12 Bänden, Bd.XII, München (Hanser) 1975, S.1037-1103.
