= Titan (Jean Paul novel) =

1800 German novel by Jean Paul

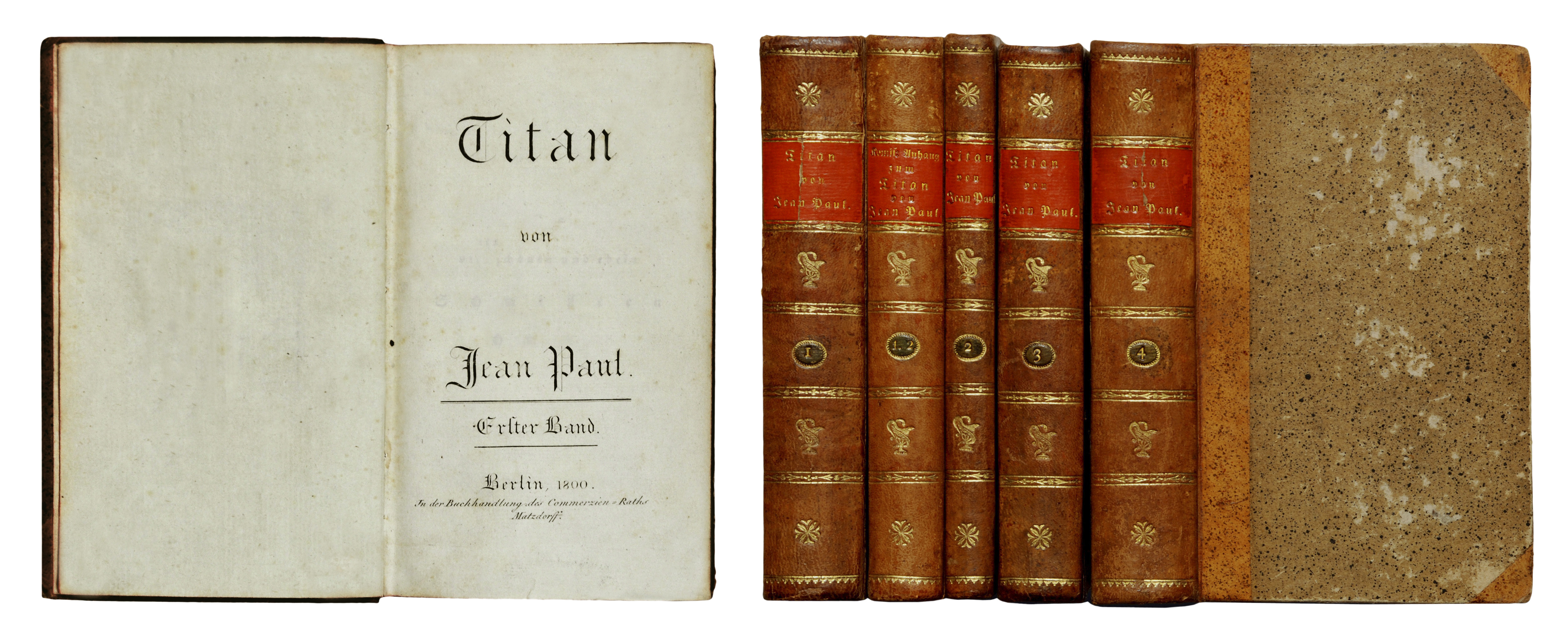
German first edition (title page, contemporary bindings))

Titan is a novel by the German writer Jean Paul, published in four volumes between 1800 and 1803. It was translated into English by Charles Timothy Brooks in 1862.

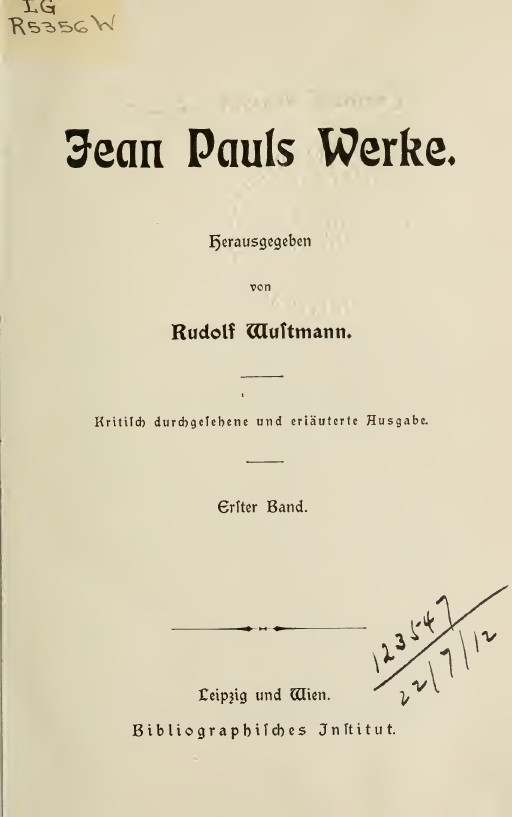
Titan, I

== Plot ==
Divided not into chapters but into "jubilees" and "cycles", Titan comprises some 900 pages and tells the story of the education of the hero Albano de Cesara, his transformation from a passionate youth into the mature man who ascends the throne of the small principality of Pestitz.

== Style and themes ==
Jean Paul called Titan his "cardinal and capital" novel. In language and style the novel differs strikingly from other texts by the writer. The narrative, despite its sentimental and effusive manner, and rich descriptions, is tightly organized and contains fewer digressions and side notes. This is often seen as a temporary approach to the classicism of Weimar, which Jean Paul at this time was subjecting to an intensive and critical examination. The rich imagery and comic misdirections are still present, and the novel remains challenging for today's readers.

Jean Paul considered using the title Anti-Titan in order to express more clearly the idea of hubris, of the inevitable doom of the Himmelsstürmer ("Heaven-stormers") of Romanticism. His aim was also to condemn "the indiscipline of the Saeculum" and the separation of the self from contemplation. In the characters of the novel (Roquairol, Schoppe, Gaspard, Liane, Linda) Jean Paul crystallizes various European controversies of the year 1800. In the end, all characters but the hero come to grief as a result of their one-sidedness. With Schoppe, the idealistic philosophy of Fichte is criticised; in Roquairol the aesthete and l'art pour l'art (Jean Paul's conception of the Weimar ideal); Gaspard encapsulates cold political calculation; Liane, a fanatical religiosity (pietism, the Moravian Church); in Linda the purportedly unseemly hubris of emancipated women. The contemplation of these examples teaches the hero to be harmonious, a mature concord of strengths rather than an individual of one concentrated power. It has been frequently commented, however, that the doomed characters are perhaps more interesting than the sometimes too smooth and perfect-seeming main character Albano.

== Legacy ==
Gustav Mahler composed a 'tone poem' titled after this novel, although in the process of revising the work he dropped the name and the 2nd movement, and the work was transformed into Mahler's First Symphony, with the composer afterwards discouraging any attempt to seek connections.

Erich Heckel was inspired by the figure of Roquairol while painting a portrait of his friend Ernst Ludwig Kirchner.

== Bibliography ==
- Dorothea Berger. Jean Paul Frederic Richter. Twayne Publishing, 1972.
- Alan Mehennet. The romantic movement. Rowman & Littlefield, 1981.
