= Thomas Beimel =

German composer, violist and musicologist

- Born: 30 May 1967; Essen, Germany
- Died: 29 June 2016 (aged 49); Wuppertal, Germany
- Education: Folkwang Hochschule; Hochschule für Musik im Rheinland
- Occupations: Composer; Violist; Musicologist
- Organizations: Partita Radicale; Bayerisches Kammerorchester
- Awards: Villa Concordia
- Website: www.thomasbeimel.de

Thomas Beimel (30 May 1967 – 29 June 2016) was a German composer, violist and musicologist.

Born in Essen, Beimel studied at the Folkwang Hochschule in his hometown, composition with Konrad Grahe and viola with Karin Wolff. He continued his studies from 1988 to 1992, instrumental pedagogy (Instrumentalpädagogik) at the Hochschule für Musik im Rheinland. He cofounded in 1989 with Ortrud Kegel, Gunda Gottschalk, Karola Pasquay and Ute Völker the ensemble Partita Radicale, which also plays free improvisation. His research was devoted from 1991 to new music in Romania and Eastern Europe, and from 2003 also to Latin America.

In 1997, began composition studies with Myriam Marbe in Bucharest. His opera Idyllen after Jean Paul was premiered at the Opernhaus Wuppertal. He received a scholarship for work and production by the Film- und Medienstiftung NRW, together with Gunda Gottschalk, which they used for the audio play Das Paradies. In 2001, Beimel's music for a stage production of Kafka's In der Strafkolonie was first performed, again in Wuppertal. From 2005 to 2006 he had a scholarship of the Villa Concordia in Bamberg. He was also composer in residence of the Bavarian chamber orchestra Bayerisches Kammerorchester. He died in Wuppertal.

== Works ==
- Zwei Augen/Sternverdunklung, piano quartet, 1994–95
- del amor que no se deja ver, for bass, mixed choir, string quartet, piano and accordion, 1995
- Die Affäre Klytaimestra, incidental music, 1995
- del amor imprevisto, for alto flute, alto, cello, percussion and piano, 1996
- L'arrivée à cythère, for alto flute and percussion, 1998
- Saeta, for six solo women's voices, 1998
- Insekten: Kinder des Lichts, paraphrase of Scriabins's Piano Sonata No. 10, for four accordions, 1998
- Idyllen, musical scenes after Jean Paul, chamber opera, 1998–99
- Okeanós, concerto for amplified cello and orchestra, 1999–2002
- …and what of the sleep of animals…, horn quartet, 2000
- …calling, from far away…, for vibraphon, 2000
- melos, for timpani, 2000
- mneme, string quartet, 2000
- tu aliento, for mezzo-soprano, 2001
- petite chanson d’amour, for voice and piano, 2001
- In der Strafkolonie, music for a staging of Kafka's short story, 2001
- faltenbalg, for five accordion ensembles, 2001
- tanâvar, for mezzo-soprano, alto flute and trombone, 2002
- auf deinen wangen / goldene tauben, after Else Lasker-Schüler for mezzo-soprano, 2002
- cólera, string quartet, 2002
- sumak, for two violas, 2003
- aynaki / deine augen, for mezzo-soprano, 2003
- veni creator spiritus, for mezzo-soprano and countertenor, 2003
- tinieblas, for accordion trio, 2003–05
- soledades, for flûte de voix (or tenor recorder), 2003
- sicut cervus, for mixed choir, timpani and trombone quartet, 2004
- (no hay) consuelo, for mezzo-soprano (or trumpet) and string trio, 2004
- cantus, for mixed choir, 2004
- schrammeln, for mezzo-soprano, 2005
- cucurucucú, for horn, harp and two percussionists, 2005
- echos, for two percussionists, 2005
- soave sia il vento, paraphrase of Mozart's terzettino from Così fan tutte, 2005
- zeitlicher rat, for chamber ensemble, 2005
- hasret, for mezzo-soprano, viola and percussion, 2006
- et in arcadia ego…, for oboe and percussion, 2006
- nacht…, for tenor and mixed choir, 2006
- hanacpachap, for mezzo-soprano, accordion and orgelpositiv, 2006
- Vom guten Ton. Die Welt ist voll Geplapper, music theatre for four voices, four wind instruments and plucking orchestra, 2012
- im anfang war das wort for mixed choir and brass, 2016
