= Köditz =

- Municipality
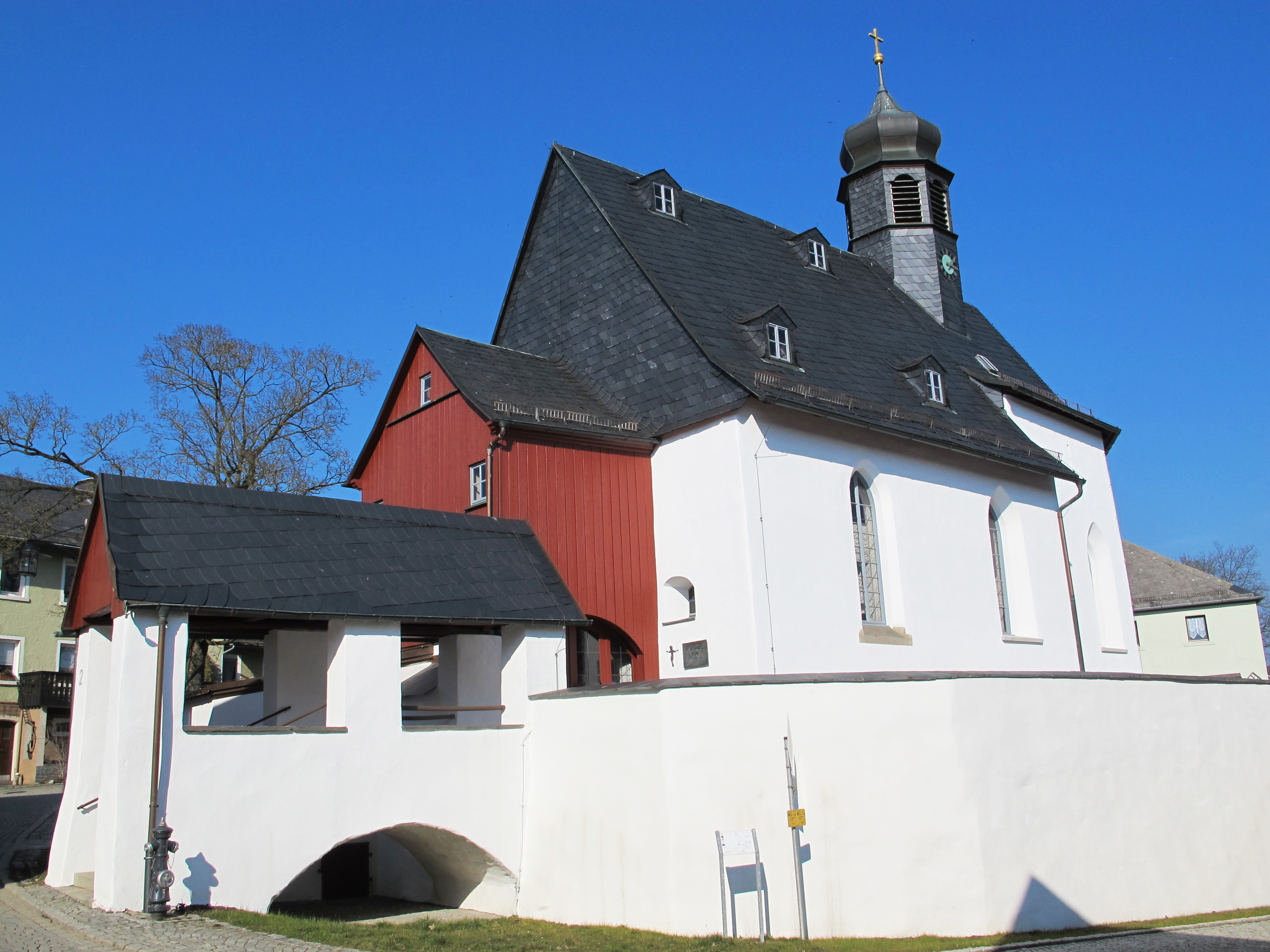
- Church of Saint Leonhard

- Coat of arms

- Location of Köditz within Hof district
- Interactive map of Köditz
- Location within Germany Location within Bavaria
- Coordinates: 50°19′N 11°50′E
- Country: Germany
- State: Bavaria
- Admin. region: Oberfranken
- District: Hof
- Subdivisions: 16 Ortsteile

Government
  - Mayor (2020–26): Matthias Beyer (FW)

Area
  - Total: 31.45 km^{2} (12.14 sq mi)
- Elevation: 450–650 m (1,480–2,130 ft)

Population (2025-12-31)
  - Total: 2,346
  - Density: 74.59/km^{2} (193.2/sq mi)
- Time zone: UTC+01:00 (CET)
  - Summer (DST): UTC+02:00 (CEST)
- Postal codes: 95189
- Dialling codes: 09281
- Vehicle registration: HO
- Website: www.gemeinde-koeditz.de

Köditz (German pronunciation: [ˈkøːdɪts]) is a municipality in Upper Franconia in the district of Hof in Bavaria in Germany.
