= Moses Rosenkranz =

German author and writer (1904–2003)

Moses Rosenkranz (1904–2003) was a German-language poet of Jewish descent. He was born in Berehomet in the former Austro-Hungarian Empire. Berehomet is part of the region of Bukovina which once hosted a large Bukovina German population; the village now falls within modern-day Ukraine. Other Bukovina Germans of Jewish origin who gained renown as writers include Paul Celan and Rose Auslander.

Rosenkranz's life was dogged by persecution, first by the Romanian regime of Ion Antonescu, followed by the Soviet gulag system and the Romanian communist regime of Nicolae Ceaușescu. He finally left for Germany in 1961, and settled down in the Black Forest region. He lived in the vicinity of Lenzkirch, where he died at the age of 98.

Bukovina was integral to his literary output throughout his life. In addition to his poetry, he is also known for his series of memoirs under the title Fragment of an Autobiography. The first volume Childhood was translated into English by David Dollenmayer, who won the Wolff Prize for his rendering.
