= Will Firth =

Australian literary translator (born 1965)

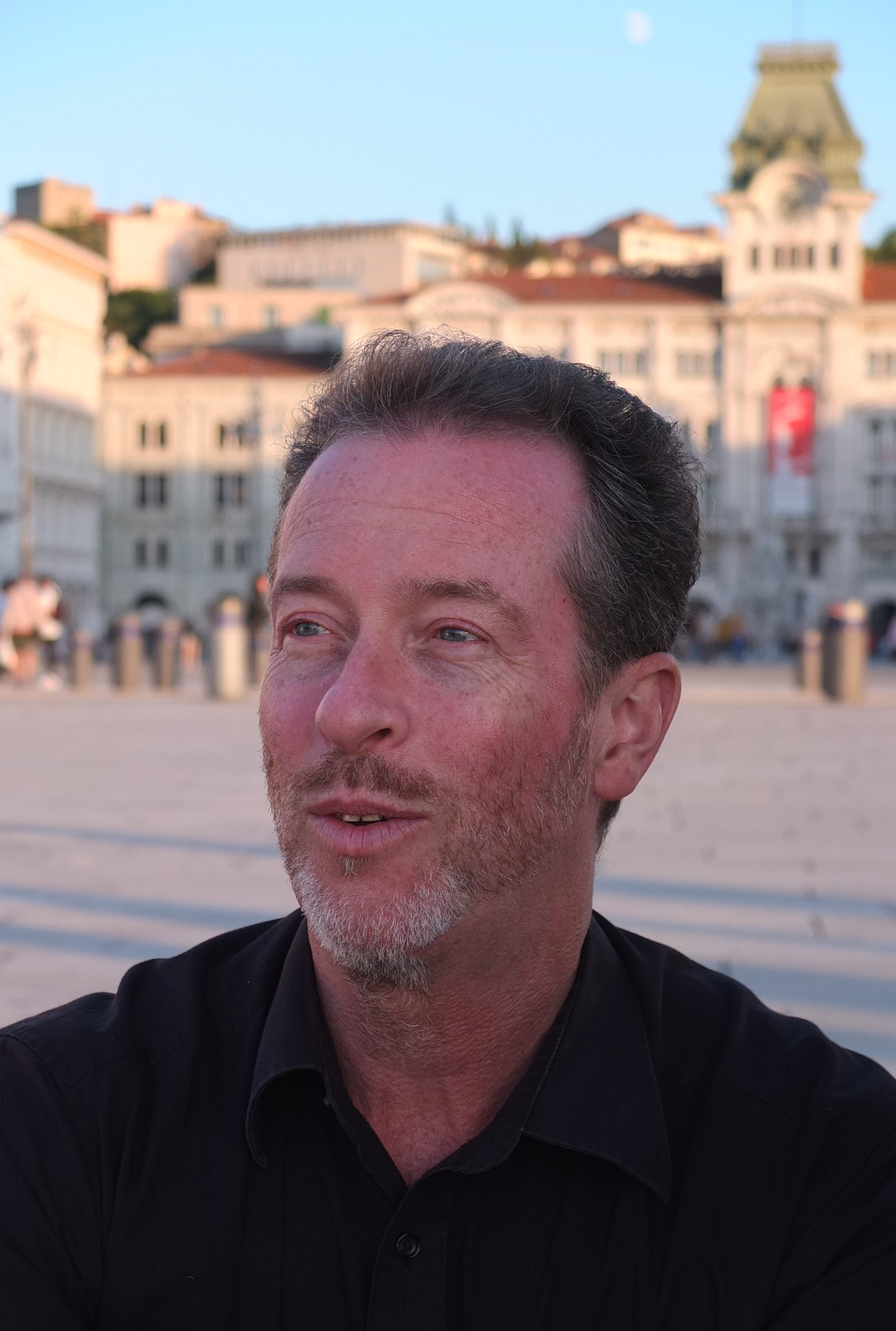
- Born: 23 May 1965; Newcastle, Australia
- Occupation: Literary translator

Will Firth (born 23 May 1965) is an Australian-German literary translator who focuses on contemporary writing from the Serbo-Croatian speaking countries and North Macedonia.

He graduated in German and Russian (with Serbo-Croatian as a minor) from the Australian National University in Canberra in 1986 (BA). He won a scholarship to read South Slavic studies at the University of Zagreb in the 1988–89 academic year and spent a further postgraduate year at the Pushkin Institute in Moscow in 1989–90. Subsequently, he qualified as a translator from Croatian, German, Macedonian and Russian with the National Accreditation Authority for Translators and Interpreters (NAATI) in Australia. Since 1991 he has been living in Germany, where he works as a freelance translator of literature and the humanities. He translates from Russian, Macedonian, and all variants of Serbo-Croatian into English, occasionally into German. In 2005-07 he worked for the International Criminal Tribunal for the former Yugoslavia (ICTY). Since the mid-2000s, Firth has largely been translating works of South Slavic literature. He is a member of the professional associations of translators in the UK (Translators Association) and Germany (VdÜ). Firth has been an Esperantist since 1985.

== Major translations ==
=== Translations into English ===
==== From Macedonian ====
- Anya's Diary (Дневникот на Ања), children's novel by Dimitar Baševski, Slovo, Skopje, 2007
- Pirey (Пиреј), novel by Petre M. Andreevski, Pollitecon Publications, Sydney, 2009 (co-translated with Mirjana Simjanovska)
- Stolen Thoughts (Украдени мисли), bilingual collection of poetry by Dušan Ristevski, Macedonian Literary Association “Grigor Prlichev”, Sydney, 2011
- The Sunrise in My Dream (Угрејсонце во мојот сон), bilingual collection of poetry by Ivan Trposki, Macedonian Literary Association “Grigor Prlichev”, Sydney, 2013
- Homunculus (Човечулец), short stories by Aleksandar Prokopiev, Istros Books, London, 2015
- The Eighth Wonder of the World (Осмото светско чудо), novel by Jordan Plevneš, Plamen Press, Washington, D.C., 2020

==== From Bosnian/Croatian/Montenegrin/Serbian ====
- Hansen's Children (Hansenova djeca), novel by Ognjen Spahić, Istros Books, London, 2011
- The Coming (Dolazak), novel by Andrej Nikolaidis, Istros Books, London, 2011
- Our Man in Iraq (Naš čovjek na terenu), novel by Robert Perišić, Istros Books, London, 2012, and Black Balloon Publishing, New York City, 2013
- A Handful of Sand (To malo pijeska na dlanu), novel by Marinko Koščec, Istros Books, London, 2013
- The Storm in the Still Life (Mrtva priroda i živo srce), epistolary novel by Ivan B. Vodopija, Ex Libris, Zagreb, 2013
- The Son (Sin), novel by Andrej Nikolaidis, Istros Books, London, 2013
- Ekaterini, novel by Marija Knežević, Istros Books, London, 2013
- The Great War (Veliki rat), novel by Aleksandar Gatalica, Istros Books, London, 2014
- Till Kingdom Come (Devet), novel by Andrej Nikolaidis, Istros Books, London, 2015
- Quiet Flows the Una (Knjiga o Uni), novel by Faruk Šehić, Istros Books, London, 2016
- Journey to Russia (Izlet u Rusiju), travelogue by Miroslav Krleža, Sandorf, Zagreb, 2017
- Head Full of Joy (Puna glava radosti), short stories by Ognjen Spahić, Dalkey Archive Press, Victoria, 2018
- Mothers and Daughters (Dabogda te majka rodila), novel by Vedrana Rudan, Dalkey Archive Press, Victoria, 2018
- A Novel of London (Roman o Londonu), novel by Miloš Crnjanski, Diálogos, New Orleans, 2020
- From Nowhere to Nowhere (Nigdje, niotkuda), novel by Bekim Sejranović, Sandorf, Zagreb, 2020
- Divine Child (Božanska dječica), novel by Tatjana Gromača, Sandorf Passage, South Portland, 2021
- Horror and Huge Expenses (Užas i veliki troškovi), short stories by Robert Perišić, Sandorf Passage, South Portland, 2021
- Sea, Sun, Salt: Short Stories from Montenegro, various authors, Gligorije Dijak, Podgorica, 2022
- Balkan Bombshells: Contemporary Women's Writing from Serbia and Montenegro, various authors, Istros Books, London, 2023
- Take Six: Six Balkan Women Writers, various authors, Dedalus Books, Sawtry, 2023
- Anomaly (Anomalija), novel by Andrej Nikolaidis, Peirene Press, Bath, 2024
- The Minister (Ministar), novel by Stefan Bošković, Sandorf Passage, South Portland, 2026
- Concrete Blues (Beton bluz), novel by Slavica Perović, Ballerini Book Press, Luzern, 2026

=== Translations into German ===
==== From Macedonian ====
- Der große Koffer (Големиот куфер), short stories by Ivan Dodovski, Edition Erata, Leipzig, 2008
- Das Buch der Mutter (Ервехе. Книга за една мајка), novel by Luan Starova, Wieser Verlag, Klagenfurt, 2010
- Das achte Weltwunder (Осмото светско чудо), novel by Jordan Plevneš, Leipziger Literaturverlag, Leipzig, 2015

==== From Bosnian/Croatian/Montenegrin/Serbian ====
- Die göttlichen Kindchen (Božanska dječica), novel by Tatjana Gromača, STROUX edition, München 2022
