= Istros Books =

London-based independent book publisher

Istros books is a London-based independent publisher of writers from South-East Europe and the Balkans, in English translation. It was set up in 2011 by Susan Curtis.

== Publications ==
Notable publications include:

- Doppelgänger by Daša Drndić (Croatia), translated by Celia Hawkesworth & S.D. Curtis, 2018.
- Seven Terrors by Selvedin Avdić (Bosnia), translated by Coral Petkovich

Shortlisted for the Republic of Consciousness Prize (2019):

- Diary of a Short-Sighted Adolescent (2016) and Gaudeamus (2018) by Mircea Eliade (Romania), translated by Christopher Moncrieff and Christopher Bartholomew.
- Exile by Çiler İlhan (Turkey), translated by Aysegul Tososer Artes, winner of the European Prize for Literature, 2011.
- The Son by Andrej Nikolaidis (Montenegro), translated by Will Firth, 2013. The original work was a winner of the European Prize for Literature, 2011.
- Life Begins on Friday by Ioana Pârvulescu (Romania), translated by Alistair Ian Blythe, with an afterword by Mircea Cărtărescu, winner of the European Prize for Literature, 2013.
- Quiet Flows the Una by Faruk Šehić (Bosnia and Herzegovina), 2016. The original work was a winner of the European Prize for Literature, 2013.
- Fairground Magician by Jelena Lengold (Serbia), translated by Celia Hawkesworth, 2013. The original work was a winner of the European Prize for Literature, 2011.

== Other authors ==
Other authors that Istros Books have published include: Dušan Šarotar, Robert Perišić, Julio Llamazares, Aleš Šteger, Ognjen Spahić, Goran Vojnović, Srećko Horvat, Slavoj Žižek, Alek Popov, Marija Knežević, Octavian Paler, Ayfer Tunç, Evald Flisar and Marinko Koščec.
