= Our Man in Iraq =

2013 novel by Robert Perišić

- Cover of the U.S. edition
- Author: Robert Perišić
- Translator: Will Firth
- Language: Croatian
- Genre: Literary fiction
- Publisher: Black Balloon Publishing (U.S. edition)
- Publication date: April 2, 2013
- Publication place: Croatia
- Media type: Print (Paperback); Digital
- Pages: 208
- ISBN: 978-1-936787-05-0

Our Man in Iraq (Croatian: Naš čovjek na terenu) is a novel by Croatian author Robert Perišić. It was originally published in Croatia, where it became a bestseller and received the Jutarnji list prize for best prose in 2007. The novel was also awarded the Literaturpreis der Steiermärkischen Sparkasse in 2011.

Our Man in Iraq was translated into English by Will Firth and published in the United Kingdom in 2012 by Istros Books and in the United States the following year by Black Balloon Publishing. It is available in paperback and e-book formats. The Guardian called the English translation "a must-read ... brilliantly captures modern-day Zagreb." It was also praised by Publishers Weekly as a "smart, cutting book" and by The Toronto Star as "terrifically witty and original." The Times Literary Supplement compared the English translation to The Good Soldier Švejk by Jaroslav Hašek and Slaughterhouse Five by Kurt Vonnegut. According to The New Yorker described the novel as "has a levity informed by the sense of social fluidity that comes with democracy." Saul Austerlitz, writing in The Boston Globe, called the work a comic novel, stating it was "an extended ruse ... [with] combat scrupulously at a distance".

Set in Zagreb during 2003, Our Man in Iraq follows Toni, a journalist who is besieged by his rural relatives with requests for work. Succumbing to his mother's nagging, Toni arranges for his cousin Boris to cover the ongoing U.S invasion of Iraq despite his lasting shell shock from the Croatian War of Independence. As Boris's reports from Iraq become increasingly strange, Toni secretly rewrites them until they cease coming in altogether and Boris goes missing. Toni is forced to keep Boris's disappearance from his family and his newspaper while negotiating his own romantic, cultural and professional hurdles in a nation that is awkwardly progressing from socialism to global capitalism.
