= Andrei Codrescu =

American writer (born 1946)

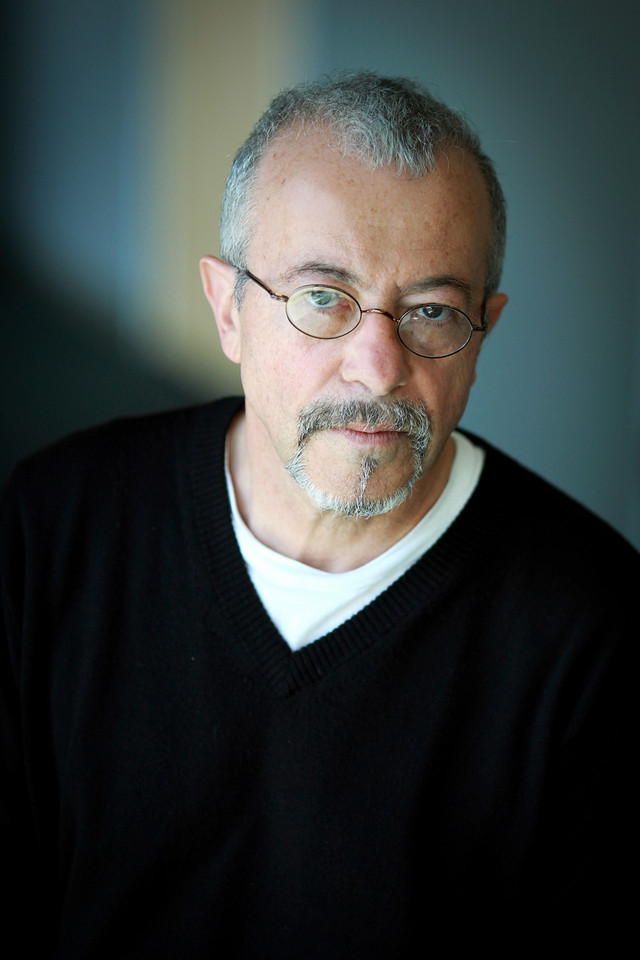
- Codrescu in 2009
- Born: December 20, 1946 (age 79); Sibiu, Kingdom of Romania
- Citizenship: Romania; United States
- Occupations: Novelist; poet; essayist; journalist; screenwriter; commentator
- Spouse(s): Aurelia Munteanu; Alice Henderson; Laura Cole Rosenthal
- Children: 2
- Writing career
- Genres: Poetry, screenwriting, journalism, fiction, non-fiction
- Notable awards: Peabody Award; Ovid Prize
- Website: www.codrescu.com

Andrei Codrescu (Romanian pronunciation: [anˈdrej koˈdresku]; born December 20, 1946) is a Romanian-born American poet, novelist, essayist, screenwriter, and commentator for National Public Radio. He is the winner of the Peabody Award for his film Road Scholar and the Ovid Prize for poetry. He was the MacCurdy Distinguished Professor of English at Louisiana State University from 1984 until his retirement in 2009.

== Biography ==
Codrescu was born in Sibiu. His father was an ethnic Romanian engineer; his mother was a non-practicing Jew. Their son was informed of his Jewish background at age 13. Codrescu published his first poems in Romanian under the pen name Andrei Steiu. In 1965 he and his mother, a photographer and printer, were able to leave Romania after Israel paid US$2,000 (or US$10,000, according to other sources) to the Romanian communist regime for each of them. After some time in Italy, they moved to the United States in 1966, and settled in Detroit, where he became a regular at John Sinclair's Artists and Writers' Workshop. A year later, he moved to New York, where he became part of the literary scene on the Lower East Side. There he met Allen Ginsberg, Ted Berrigan, and Anne Waldman, and published his first poems in English.

In 1970, his poetry book, License to Carry a Gun, won the "Big Table Poetry Award". He moved to San Francisco in 1970, and lived on the West Coast for seven years, four of those in Monte Rio, a Sonoma County town on the Russian River. He also lived in Baltimore (where he taught at Johns Hopkins University), New Orleans and Baton Rouge, publishing a book every year. During this time he wrote poetry, stories, essays and reviews for many publications, including The New York Times, the Chicago Tribune, the Los Angeles Times, Harper's, and the Paris Review. He had regular columns in The Baltimore Sun, the City Paper, Architecture, Funny Times, Gambit Weekly, and Neon.

Codrescu was a regular commentator on National Public Radio's news program, All Things Considered, from 1983 until 2016. He won the 1995 Peabody Award for the film Road Scholar, an American road movie that he wrote and starred in, and is a two-time winner of the Pushcart Prize. His book So Recently a World: Selected Poems, 1968-2016 was a National Book Award nominee.

In 1989, Codrescu covered the Romanian Revolution for National Public Radio and ABC News's Nightline. His renewed interest in the Romanian language and literature led to new work written in Romanian, including Miracle and Catastrophe, a book-length interview conducted by the theologian Robert Lazu, and The Forgiven Submarine, an epic poem written in collaboration with poet Ruxandra Cesereanu, which won the 2008 Radio România Cultural award. His books have been translated into Romanian by Ioana Avadani, Ioana Ieronim, Carmen Firan, Rodica Grigore, and Lăcrimioara Stoie. In 2002 Codrescu returned to Romania with a PBS Frontline World video crew to "take the temperature" of his homeland and produced the story, "My Old Haunts". In 2005 he was awarded the prestigious international Ovidius Prize (also known as the Ovid Prize), previous winners of which include Mario Vargas Llosa, Amos Oz, and Orhan Pamuk.

In 1981, Codrescu became a naturalized citizen of the United States. He is the editor and founder of the online journal Exquisite Corpse, a journal of "books and ideas". He reigned as King of the Krewe du Vieux for the 2002 New Orleans Mardi Gras season.

Codrescu's archives and much of his personal library are now part of the Louisiana State University Libraries Special Collections, University of Iowa Libraries, New Orleans Historical Society, and the University of Illinois at Urbana–Champaign.

== Family ==
His first wife was Aurelia Munteanu. His second wife was Alice Henderson, the mother of his two sons, Lucian Codrescu and Tristan Codrescu. His third wife, Laura Rosenthal (née Cole), was an editor at Exquisite Corpse: a Journal of Books & Ideas and coeditor of three poetry anthologies.

== Awards and honors ==
- MacCurdy Distinguished Professor of English, Louisiana State University
- Peabody Award for Road Scholar
- Ovid Prize
- National Endowment for the Arts Fellowships for poetry; editing; radio
- Big Table Poetry Award
- Lowell Thomas Gold Award for Excellence in Travel Journalism
- Towson State University Literature Prize
- General Electric Foundation Poetry Prize
- ACLU Freedom of Speech Award; Mayor's Arts Award, New Orleans
- Literature Prize of the Romanian Cultural Foundation, Bucharest

== Works ==
=== Books ===
- Codrescu, Andrei (2019). No Time Like Now. University of Pittsburgh Press – via codrescu.com.
- Codrescu, Andrei (2017). Submarinul Iertat by Ruxandra Cesereanu & Andrei Codrescu Anniversary Edition with Epistolary. Bucharest: Editura Charmades – via codrescu.com.
- Codrescu, Andrei (2016). The Art of Forgetting: new poems. Editura Caiete Silvane – via codrescu.com.
- Codrescu, Andrei (2013). Bibliodeath: My Archives (With Life in Footnotes). ANTIBOOKCLUB. ISBN 978-0-9838-6833-0 – via codrescu.com.
- 2013: So Recently Rent a World: New and Selected Poems, translated into Swedish by Dan Shafran (Coffee House Press)
- 2011: Whatever Gets You through the Night: A Story of Sheherezade and the Arabian Entertainments (Princeton University Press, ISBN 978-1-4008-3801-1)
- 2010: The Poetry Lesson (Princeton University Press)
- 2009: The Posthuman Dada Guide: Tzara and Lenin Play Chess (Princeton University Press)
- 2008: Jealous Witness: New Poems (with a CD by the New Orleans Klezmer All-Stars) (Coffee House Press)
- 2007: Submarinul iertat, with Ruxandra Cesereanu, Timişoara, Romania: Editura Brumar; translated by Andrei Codrescu, as The Forgiven Submarine, Black Widow Press, 2009.
- 2007: Femeia neagră a unui culcuş de hoţi, Bucharest: Editura Vinea.
- 2006: New Orleans, Mon Amour: Twenty Years of Writing from the City, New York and Chapel Hill: Algonquin Books.
- 2006: Miracol şi catastrofă: Dialogues in Cyberspace with Robert Lazu, Timişoara, Romania: Editura Hartman.
- 2005: Instrumentul negru. Poezii, 1965-1968, (Editura Scrisul Romanesc)
- 2004: Scandal of Genius: How Salvador Dali Smuggled Baudelaire into the Science Fair (Dali Museum)
- 2004: Wakefield: a novel, New York and Chapel Hill: Algonquin Books.
- 2003: It Was Today: New Poems Minneapolis: Coffee House Press
- 2002: Casanova in Bohemia, a novel New York: The Free Press
- 2001: An Involuntary Genius in America’s Shoes (and What Happened Afterwards), Santa Rosa: Black Sparrow Press, Re-issue of The Life & Times of an Involuntary Genius, 1976, and In America's Shoes, 1983, with new forward and coda-essay.
- 2000: The Devil Never Sleeps & Other Essays. New York: St. Martin's Press. Essays.
- 2000: Poezii alese/Selected Poetry, bi-lingual edition, English and Romanian Bucharest: Editura Paralela 45.
- 1999: A Bar in Brooklyn: Novellas & Stories, 1970-1978 Santa Rosa: Black Sparrow Press.
- 1999: Messiah, a novel. New York: Simon & Schuster.
- 1999: Hail Babylon! Looking for the American City at the End of the Millennium. New York: St. Martin's Press 1999, New York and London: Picador, 1999. Essays.
- 1999: Ay, Cuba! A Socio-Erotic Journey. With photographs by David Graham. New York: St. Martin's Press, New York and London: Picador. Travel/Essay.
- 1997: The Dog With the Chip in His Neck: Essays from NPR & Elsewhere. New York: St. Martin's Press, New York and London: Picador.
- 1996: Alien Candor: Selected Poems, 1970-1995, Santa Rosa: Black Sparrow Press.
- 1995: The Muse Is Always Half-Dressed in New Orleans. New York: St. Martin's Press. New York and London: Picador, 1996. Essays.
- 1995: The Blood Countess. New York: Simon & Schuster. New York: Dell.
- 1995: Zombification: Essays from NPR. New York: St. Martin's Press. New York and London: Picador.
- 1994: The Repentance of Lorraine, New York: Rhinoceros Books. Reprint with new introduction of 1976 Pocketbooks edition by Ames Claire)
- 1993: Belligerence, Minneapolis: Coffee House Press.
- 1993: Road Scholar: Coast to Coast Late in the Century, with photographs by David Graham. A journal of the making of the movie Road Scholar. New York: Hyperion.
- 1991: The Hole in the Flag: a Romanian Exile's Story of Return and Revolution (New York: Morrow. New York: Avon.
- 1991: Comrade Past and Mister Present, Minneapolis: Coffee House Press.
- 1990: The Disappearance of the Outside: a Manifesto for Escape. Boston: Addison-Wesley Co.1990; reissued by Ruminator Press, 2001
- 1988: A Craving for Swan, Columbus: Ohio State University Press.
- 1987: Monsieur Teste in America & Other Instances of Realism, Minneapolis: Coffee House Press.
- 1987: Raised by Puppets Only to Be Killed by Research, Boston: Addison-Wesley.
- 1983: In America’s Shoes, San Francisco: City Lights.
- 1983: Selected Poems 1970-1980, New York: Sun Books.
- 1982: Necrocorrida. San Francisco: Panjandrum Books.
- 1979: The Lady Painter, Boston: Four Zoas Press.
- 1978: For the Love of a Coat, Boston: Four Zoas Press.
- 1975: The Life & Times of an Involuntary Genius. New York: George Braziller.
- 1974: The Marriage of Insult & Injury. Woodstock: Cymric Press.
- 1973: The History of the Growth of Heaven. New York: George Braziller.
- 1973: A Serious Morning. Santa Barbara: Capra Press.
- 1971: Why I Can’t Talk on the Telephone, San Francisco: kingdom kum press.
- Codrescu, Andrei (1970). 'License to Carry a Gun' | Big Table Poetry Award. Chicago: Big Table/Follet. reprinted. Pittsburgh: Carnegie-Mellon University Press – via codrescu.com.

=== Editor/founder ===
- 1983-1997 Exquisite Corpse: a Journal of Books and Ideas. Archived from the original on June 28, 2012.
- 1997-2011 corpse.org, the online version

=== Anthologies edited ===
- Hearn, Lafcadio (2019). Japanese Tales of Lafcadio Hearn. Princeton University Press. ISBN 9780691167756.
- Codrescu, Andrei; Rosenthal, Laura, eds. (1999). Thus Spake the Corpse : An Exquisite Corpse Reader 1988-1998. Vol. 2. Santa Barbara: Black Sparrow Press. ISBN 1574231421.
- Codrescu, Andrei; Rosenthal, Laura, eds. (1999). Thus Spake the Corpse : An Exquisite Corpse Reader 1988-1998. Vol. 1. Santa Barbara: Black Sparrow Press. ISBN 1574231014.
- Codrescu, Andrei; Rosenthal, Laura, eds. (1996). American Poets Say Goodbye to the 20th Century. New York: 4 Walls/8 Windows Press.
- Codrescu, Andrei (1988). American Poetry Since 1970: Up Late. New York: 4 Walls/8 Windows Press. Archived from the original on August 13, 2020.
- Codrescu, Andrei (August 1989). The Stiffest of the Corpse: an Exquisite Corpse Reader, 1983-1990. San Francisco: City Lights Books. ISBN 0872862135.

=== As translator ===
- In Praise of Sleep: Selected Poems of Lucian Blaga. Commonwealth Books, Black Widow. 2019. ISBN 978-0872862135 – via codrescu.com.
- At the Court of Yearning: Poems by Lucian Blaga. Columbus: Ohio State University Press. 1989. ISBN 0872862135 – via codrescu.com.

== Presence in English Language Anthologies ==
- Carmen Firan; Paul Doru Mugur, eds. (2006). Born in Utopia (An Anthology of Romanian Modern and Contemporary Poetry). Talisman House Publishers. ISBN 978-1584980506.
- Daniel Ioniță, ed. (2017). Testament - Anthology of Romanian Verse - American Edition. Australian-Romanian Academy Publishing. ISBN 978-0-9953502-0-5.
- Daniel Ioniță, ed. (2019). Testament - 400 Years of Romanian Poetry - 400 de ani de poezie românească. Editura Minerva. ISBN 978-973-21-1070-6.
- Daniel Ioniță, ed. (2020). Romanian Poetry from its Origins to the Present. Australian-Romanian Academy Publishing. ISBN 978-0-9953502-8-1.

== Controversial comments ==
Codrescu was a commentator for NPR, and on the December 19, 1995, broadcast of All Things Considered, Codrescu reported that some Christians believe in a "rapture" and four million believers will ascend to Heaven immediately. He continued, "The evaporation of 4 million who believe this crap would leave the world an instantly better place."

NPR subsequently apologized for the anti-Christianity of Codrescu's comments, saying, "Those remarks offended listeners and crossed a line of taste and tolerance that we should have defended with greater vigilance."
