= Slovene punctuation =

Punctuation in the Slovene language

Punctuation marks are one or two part graphical marks used in writing, denoting tonal progress, pauses, sentence type (syntactic use), abbreviations, et cetera.

Marks used in Slovene include full stops (.), question marks (?), exclamation marks (!), commas (,), semicolons (;), colons (:), dashes (–), hyphens (-), ellipses (...), different types of inverted commas and quotation marks (⟨“...”⟩, ⟨‘...’⟩, ⟨‚...‘⟩, ⟨„...“⟩, ⟨»...«⟩), brackets ((), [], {}) (which are in syntactical use), as well as apostrophes (',’), solidi (/), equal signs (=), and so forth.

== Full stop ==
Syntactical use

A full stop (.) is a left-leaning punctuation mark. This means that it 'touches' the preceding word, but is followed by a space.

It is ordinarily used at the end of a neutral declaratory sentence, be it a real sentence with a predicate or a non-sentence.

- To je bilo včeraj. (This was yesterday.)
- Včeraj. (Yesterday.)

When a statement is articulated, the pitch is cadent, thus decreased towards the end of such a sentence.

In an indicative compound sentence with the last part an independent clause that does not end in a full stop, the full stop is omitted.

- Rekli so mi, naj grem, a kam? (They told me to go, but where?)
  - (and not "Rekli so mi, naj grem, a kam?.")

The final punctuation mark of a quoted sentence (with or without inverted commas) within a declaratory sentence is omitted if the quoted sentence is not preceded by a colon.

- Ko smo hodili po travi, smo opazili prepoved Ne hodi po travi. (When walking on the grass, we noticed the restriction Do not walk on the grass.)
- Ko smo hodili po travi, smo opazili prepoved: Ne hodi po travi!

A full stop is replaced by a comma in direct speech before the accompanying sentence.

- "Oh, mar bi bile ostale doma," je zamrmrala Marjeta. ("Oh, they/we might as well have stayed home," muttered Marjeta (Daisy).)

Non-syntactical use

Some abbreviations are, as in American English, always followed by a full stop.

- dr. (doktor; Dr, doctor); npr. (na primer; e.g., for example, exempli gratia); tj. (to je; this is); l. (leto; year); t.i. (tako imenovani; so-called); itn., itd. (in tako naprej, in tako dalje; etc., et cetera, and so on).

However, other abbreviations are, as in American English, never followed by a full stop.

- ZDA (Združene države Amerike; USA, United States of America)
- km (kilometer; km, kilometre)
- Fe (železo; Fe, iron)

Ordinal numerals are followed by a full stop.

Numbers may be separated by leaning full stops in the following cases:

- for time of the day
  - Ob 22.15 ('dvaindvajset petnajst' or 'dvaindvajsetih in petnajst minut') se film konča. (At 22.15 (10.15 pm) the film ends.)
    - 22.15 can also be written as 22^{15}
- to separate thousands from the rest
  - 1.000.000 (en milijon; one million, 1,000,000) (but more usual is 1 000 000)
- to show multiplication
  - 3 · 9 (tri krat devet; three times nine)
    - note that in this case, the dot is raised to the line centre and is non-leaning

Dates are written with dots separating the day, month and year. Note that the numerical English dates below are British English; American English switches the month and the day. It is important to realise that the full stop is left-leaning; the space is intentional (yet only few are aware of that).

- 1. 10. 2003 (prvi deseti dva tisoč tri, prvi oktober dva tisoč tri; the first of October, two thousand and three, 1/10/2003)
- 25. 6. 1991 (petindvajseti šesti (junij) tisoč devetsto enaindevetdeset; the twenty-fifth of June, nineteen ninety-one, 25/6/1991)
- 30. maj (trideseti maj; the 30th of May)

If a non-syntactical full stop is at the end of a sentence, it is not usual to append another full stop to it; however, doing so is not incorrect.

- Prodajam časopise, avtobusne žetone, zobne ščetke itd. (I sell newspapers, bus tokens, toothbrushes, etc.)
- Prodajam časopise, avtobusne žetone, zobne ščetke itd..

== Ellipsis ==
Syntactical use

An ellipsis (in Slovene, literally 'three dots') (...) is a non-leaning punctuation mark. It expresses omission of words.

- Nekaj sem govorila ... (I was saying something ...)
- ... kaj to ni res? (... is this not true?)
- Heh ... česa vsega ne pove. (Heh ... whatever he/she says.)
- Ja ... in? (Yes ... so?)
- Saj bi šel, pa ... (I/He would go, but ...) (an alternative is to write this thus: "Saj bi šel, pa –)

Any other punctuation may or may not be appended; a full stop is usually (but not always) omitted, but other punctuation normally remains:

- Da … or Da …. (Yes …)
- O, a tako je bilo …? (Oh, it was so …?)

When emphasising that whatever has been left out is a subsequent omission not performed by the original author, the ellipsis is enclosed in round or square brackets ((), []), or, more often, in solidi (//).

- The original sentence in full: "Nekaj mi šepeta, nekaj točno določenega, skoraj čutiti bi se dalo, da gre ta šolska ura h koncu." (Something is whispering to me, something exactly defined, it can almost be felt, that this period is nearing completion.)
  - Nekaj mi šepeta /.../ da gre ta šolska ura h koncu. (Something is whispering to me /.../ that this period is nearing completion.)

An ellipsis may indicate an inserted sentence, though a dash is more often used in such cases:

- Lepo je bilo ... kako tudi ne? ..., saj je dež nežno padal, mi pa smo tesno drug ob drugem ležali ob kaminu. (It was nice ... how wouldn't it be? ... for the rain was gently falling, and we were lying closely to one another near the fireplace.)
  - Lepo je bilo – kako tudi ne? –, saj je dež nežno padal, mi pa smo tesno drug ob drugem ležali ob kaminu.

An ellipsis usually indicates pausing or abrupt interruption. When used as a sentence closing punctuation mark, the pitch is cadent, thus decreased towards the end of such a sentence, or semi-cadent, indicating a half-finished thought, or there is no change in pitch.

Non-syntactical use

A non-syntactical ellipsis is left-leaning, and expresses omission of a word part.

- Otorinola... – ne vem naprej. (Otorhinola... – I don't know further.) (probably otorinolaringolog; otorhinolaryngologist)
- Tristo kosmatih med... (Three hundred hairy be...) ("Tristo kosmatih medvedov" (Three hundred hairy bears) is a traditional – and one of the few present in Slovene – profanity, though rather innocent and extremely seldom used.)

== Exclamation mark ==
Syntactical use

An exclamation mark (!) is a left-leaning punctuation mark. It is used as a closing punctuation mark of emphatic sentences and clauses, and as a non-closing punctuation mark finishing inserted sentences. They are typical of imperative mood, but only if emotionally charged.

- Gregor, utihni! (Gregor, shut up!)
- Mojbog! (My god!)
- Na pomoč! (Help!)
- Pleši, pleši, dokler ti petke dopuste! (Dance, dance, as long as your shoe heels allow for that!)
- To se mi je zdela odlična ideja! (That I thought a marvellous idea!)
- Spoštovani! (Respected! (at the beginning of a letter, though more usual is "Spoštovani,"))
- Ubil te bom! (I shall kill you!)
- Če mi še kdaj izustiš kaj takega ...! (If you ever say something like that again ...!)
- Mnogo let nazaj – joj, da bi le že pozabila na to! – sem živela na kmetiji. (Many years ago – oh, if only I should forget this already! – I lived on a farm.)
- Reci mu vendar, naj pride domov! (Tell him to come home! – the exclamation mark is likely bound to 'come home', however, and not 'tell')
- Zrecitiraj Kons V! (Recite Kons V!) (But: "Zrecitiraj: Kons V.")
- "Gremo!" je vzkliknila Janja. ("Let's go!" exclaimed Janja.)

See the note on the use of the combination with a question mark below under question mark. One may use the combination !! (or even more exclamation marks) to express further exclamatory mood.

- Kaj?! (What?!)
- Izgini!! (Get lost!!)

Non-syntactical use

An exclamation mark may be used for emphasis of a certain point in a text.

- Morda je to res, a emancipacijo (!) testov smo pričakovali. (Perhaps that is true, but the emancipation (!) of tests has been expected. – used to emphasise a word used, which should probably be evalvacijo (evaluation))
- Nuna (!) je strastno govorila o umetnosti ljubljenja. (The nun (!) passionately talked about the art of making love.)

== Question mark ==
Syntactical use

A question mark (?) is a left-leaning punctuation mark. It is used in single clause sentences and in compound sentences in which the independent clause expresses enquiries.

- Si res želiš, Ana, dobiti enojko? (Do you, Ana, really wish to get a one (the worst grade at school)?)
- Tukaj? (Here?)
- Oh, kaj res? (Oh, really? (in a bored tone))
- Rok, kam greš? (Rok, whither are you going? (normally, the English would say 'Where', but it is important to distinguish between whither (kam) and where (kje) in Slovene))
- Pogovarjali smo se, bilo je zelo zanimivo, potem pa je Luka nenadoma rekel – uganeš kaj? (We had been talking, it had been very interesting, but then Luka suddenly said – guess what?)
- "Je to res, Urša?" je zavpil professor. ("Is this true, Urša?" shouted the professor.)

When a question without a question word or with ali, or with ?? or ?! is articulated, the pitch is anticadent, thus increased towards the end of such a sentence. Otherwise, the pitch is cadent, thus decreased towards the end of such a sentence.

If the independent clause of a sentence is not interrogative, the sentence ends with a full stop or an exclamation mark. This is similar to reported speech in English.

- Vprašali so me, če grem peš ali s taksijem. (They asked me if I should walk or go by taxi.)
- O čem se gre predstava, tega pač ne vem. (What the performance is about, that I just don't know. (with the implied meaning that the original question is stupid, for how am I to know?))

After a colon, the clause keeps its own punctuation mark.

- Čigav je že izrek: Užij dan. (Whose is, again, the saying, Seize the day?)
  - This sentence can also be written as "Čigav je že izrek Užij dan?" or "Čigav je že izrek 'Užij dan'?".

A question mark need not be a sentence terminating punctuation mark; it may be used in inserted sentences.

- Govorim o hibridizaciji sp² – to veš, kaj je? – ogljikovega atoma v tej organski molekuli. (I am talking about the sp² hybridisation – do you know what this is? – of the carbon atom in this organic molecule.)

In certain cases, the question mark may be doubled (for emphasis of a repeated question), or it may be combined with an exclamation mark in emphatic and emotional contexts.

- Kako narediš to? Kako?? (How do you do this? How??)
- Le kako si lahko dovoliš kaj takega?! (However can you allow yourself something like that?!)

Non-syntactical use

A question mark can be used non-syntactically if it denotes doubt.

- Dejali so, da se je nafta (?) razlila. (They have said that oil (?) has spilt.) (the speaker is not certain whether it was oil or something else, or perhaps if this is indeed how the word is spelt)

== Colon ==
Syntactical use

A colon (:) is a left-leaning punctuation mark. It is used in various ways as described below.

1. to introduce direct speech after an accompanying sentence

- Zadregetala je od same jeze: "Kaj? Tako drago?" (She shivered with pure anger: "What? So expensive?")
- Kot v zboru so dejali: Seveda. (As though in a choir they said: Naturally.)
- Kot v zboru so dejali: "Seveda."
- Estragon: Pejva. (Estragon: Let's go.) (from Samuel Beckett's Waiting for Godot (Čakajoč Godota))

2. in enumeration, expatiation or explanation

- So stvari, o katerih ne vem popolnoma nič: fiziologija, oftalmologíja, socialna antropologija. (There are things I know absolutely nothing about: physiology, ophthalmology, social anthropology.)
- Potrebuje se: moka, mleko, med in sojina omaka. (Needed are: flour, milk, honey and soya sauce.) – this may also be written as "Potrebuje se moka, mleko, med in sojina omaka."
- Zahvaliti se želim še posebej: (I wish to thank especially:)
  - Jožetu,
  - Pulheriji,
  - Cvetki,
  - Cirilu.
- Sodelujemo vsi: to vključuje tudi tebe, Metka. (Everyone participates: this includes you, Metka.)
- To je lepo: neizmerna umetnina. (This is beautiful: an unmeasurable piece of art.) – this may also be written as "To je lepo, in pri tem neizmerna umetnina." (This is beautiful, and an unmeasurable piece of art at that.) or similarly
- Rekel sem: ne rekel, vzkliknil! (I said: not said, exclaimed!) – this may also be written as "Rekel sem – ne rekel, vzkliknil!" or "Rekel sem, ne rekel, vzkliknil!"
- V najbolj preprosti obliki ti povem, ker vem, da ne razumeš dobro: spelji se mi izpred oči. (I tell you in the simplest form, for I know you do not understand well: get out of my sight.)

3. optionally after form data

- Ime in priimek: (Name and surname:)
- Datum: (Date:)

When a colon is encountered in reading, the pitch is semi-cadent, thus decreased.

Non-syntactical use

1. for the meaning 'proti' (to, against) (usually non-leaning):

- Rezultat je bil 1 : 2 [ena proti dva]. (The result was 1 : 2.)
- Množini ogljika in klorove (VII) kisline sta v razmerju 1 : 1 [ena proti ena]. (The amounts of carbon and chloric (VII) acid are in the ratio 1 : 1.)

2. for the meaning 'deljeno' (divided):

- 15 : 3 = 5 (petnajst deljeno s tri je pet) (fifteen divided by three is five)

== Inverted comma ==
An inverted comma („ “) is a two part left- and right-leaning punctuation mark. There are many types of inverted commas used in Slovene texts, videlicet:

- standard double up-down: „ABC“
- standard single up-down: ‚ABC‘
- line centred double (used in some printed material): »ABC«
- line centred single (used in some printed material): ›ABC‹
- double up (used in some printed material): "ABC" or ”ABC“
- single up (used in some printed material): 'ABC' or ’ABC‘

The most prominent use of inverted commas is direct speech.

- „Potem pa kar grem,“ je zaihtel Jaka. ("Then I shall just be on my way," sobbed Jaka.)
- Jaka je zaihtel: „Potem pa kar grem.“
- „Potem pa,“ je zaihtel Jaka, „kar grem.“

Inverted commas are positioned so that the first one is right-leaning, and the second one is left-leaning, coming after the ending punctuation mark of the direct speech sentence. If what the inverted commas enclose is not a sentence in itself but only a part thereof, the second inverted comma stands left-leaning directly to the ending character. This is the same as in the so-called British or logical quoting.

- „Dobro jutro,“ je pohitel novi assistant. ("Good morning," hurried the new assistant.)
- Govorili so o „nekem blaznem načrtu“. (They were talking about "some crazy plan".)

If there is no accompanying sentence, inverted commas may be replaced with a dash:

- – Potem pa kar grem.

When the direct speech includes another direct speech, different types of inverted commas ought to be used, or the inner ones may be omitted if the context is clear.

- Začela je: „Uganeš, kaj mi je tista ostudna pošast rekla? Rekla je: ‚Potem pa kar jutri pridi. Bo v redu?‘“ (She started: "Can you guess what that hideous monster told me? She ('monster' is feminine) said: 'Then just come tomorrow. Will that be all right?'")
- Začela je: ‚Uganeš, kaj mi je tista ostudna pošast rekla? Rekla je: „Potem pa kar jutri pridi. Bo v redu?“‘
- Začela je: »Uganeš, kaj mi je tista ostudna pošast rekla? Rekla je: „Potem pa kar jutri pridi. Bo v redu?“«

Inverted commas are also used when trying to stress a curious use of a word: that is, to illustrate that a word is not used as it normally is, or simply to emphasise it. Usually, in printed texts, such words are printed either italic or bold as opposed to using excessive quotes.

- Pravi „prijatelj“ je. (He is a real "friend".)
- Kaj pa pravzaprav pomeni „svoboda“? (What does "freedom" actually mean anyway?)
- Ne vem, zakaj govori o „alternative medicine“; kot da bi bilo tako težko reči „alternativna medicina“. (I do not know why he/she is talking about "alternative medicine" (left intact); as though it is so difficult to say "alternative medicine".)
- Accusative 'tožilnik' je velikokrat združen z dative 'dajalnikom' v oblique 'predmetni' sklon. (The accusative is often merged with the dative into the oblique case. – notice that in this case, single up inverted commas are used)

Inverted commas are also used to mark proper nouns that could be mistaken for common nouns, such as at sentence beginnings.

- „Sonetni venec“ je zelo zapleten. (The "Wreath of Sonnets" is very complex. – referring likely to Prešeren's wreath of sonnets by that name)
  - But: Prešernov Sonetni venec je zelo zapleten. (Prešeren's Wreath of Sonnets is very complex.)

== Dash ==
A dash (–) is a one or two part non-leaning punctuation mark (except where noted). Semantically, there is no difference between the longer and the shorter dash, – and –, although common usage prefers the shorter one in all cases except upon connection of unrelated sentences. In electronic writing, a hyphen may be used instead of a dash.

A dash usually indicates pausing or abrupt interruption. When used as a sentence closing punctuation mark, the pitch is cadent, thus decreased towards the end of such a sentence, or semi-cadent, indicating a half-finished thought, or there is no change in pitch.

A dash can be used instead of a comma to emphasise separation words and clauses. Note that in example 2, unlike in English, the end of the appositive is unmarked in Slovene.

- Smrt fašizmu – svoboda narodu! (Death to fascism – freedom to the nation!)
- O problemu individuacija – rast sebstva po Frommu smo morali pisati esej. (We had to write an essay on the problem 'individuation – growth of self' as per Fromm.)

It is also used when inserting sentences or including additional information.

- Subtilna občutja – to je, nežna in občutljiva – se očividno izražajo v prebranem delu. (Subtile emotions – that is, gentle and delicate – are apparently expressed in the read work.) (note that the word 'subtile' in this sense in English is somewhat old-fashioned)
- Da – tako je tudi res bilo –, in to sem mu jasno povedala. (Yes – and it really was so, too –, and I told him that clearly.)
- Joj, prejoj – občutljivi kot smo bili – sneg je zapadel in zeblo nas je. (Oh dear and even more so – sensitive as we were – snow had fallen and we were feeling cold.)

Sentence punctuation is not changed when using dashes, so an inserted sentence before a comma is usually followed by a comma nonetheless, even though some might see this usage as rather pedantic.

A dash at the end of a sentence marks an abrupt end, a breaking of thought or unwillingness to continue:

- Zapeti bi bila morala, pa – (I should have sung, but –)
- Če v bližnji prihodnosti, kolega Novak, ne zaprete svojega kljunčka, bomo prisiljeni izvesti določene sankcije, kot so, denimo, mučenje ali preprost izgon: svarim Vas: bodite tiho, če ne –! (If you, colleague Novak (likely a university student), do not close your beak (sarcastic for mouth), we shall be forced to impose certain sanctions, such as, let us say, torture or a simple exile: I am warning you: be silent, or else –!)

In sentences without a predicate, a dash can represent the connexion between the subject and the object.

- Vino – strup ali zdravilo? (Wine – poison or medicine?)

A dash can introduce direct speech if there is no accompanying sentence before direct speech itself.

A dash sometimes separates multiple surnames, though it is more usual to merely use a space. A dash is still used when listing an alias after a full name, but only if this alias does not function as a surname. In these senses, a dash is a leaning punctuation mark.

- Katarina Čkorjanc–Vesel (or Katarina Čkorjanc-Vesel, or, as it is oftenest, Katarina Čkorjanc Vesel)
- Josip Broz–Tito
- Karel Veliki (Charles the Great)
- Karel Plešasti (Charles the Bald)

Similarly, a leaning dash is used in other instances where words are closely connected to one another and both parts are inflected.

- Kozina–Hrpelje ('Kozina in Hrpelje', two places)

A dash also expresses the meaning of 'to' or 'up to' or 'until':

- cena: 1000–1200 SIT (the price: SIT 1000–1200)
- "Otroci, na vlaku Trst–Dunaj zaspite. Tam vmes ničesar ni." (Children, on the train Triest–Vienna, go to sleep. There is nothing in between.) (Tomaž Šalamun)
- Za domačo nalogo boste rešili naloge 272–279. (For homework, you will do exercises 272–279.)
- Delovni čas: 0–24 (Opening hours: 0–24)

A dash is used as the symbol for minus, although the separate minus sign is also used:

- 5x² – 5x – 1 = 0
- –2 °C

Dashes may introduce lists. For example:
– prvi primer,
– drugi primer,
– tretji primer.

== Hyphen ==
A hyphen (- or ‐) is a leaning punctuation mark (except where noted).

In compound words that would otherwise use the word in (and) between the parts, a hyphen is used:

- zeleno-moder pulover (a green and blue jumper)
  - but 'zelenomoder pulover' if the colour is a mix of green and blue (thus also 'etnocentričen' (ethnocentric), not 'etno-centričen', since one cannot add an 'and' in between the words)
- slovensko-nemški slovar (a Slovene-German dictionary)
- angleško-francoski konflikt (an English-French conflict)
- črno-belo tiskanje (black-and-white printing)

A hyphen is also used as in the following examples:

- Janko Novak-Rovtar (as an equivalent to a dash; see above)
- 30-letnica (30th anniversary or a woman in her thirties)
- TV-oddaja (television programme)
- tri- in petdnevni tečaji (three and five day courses)
- avtonomija in -kracija (autonomy and autocracy)
- ATP, ATP-ja (inflexion of symbols and acronyms)
- le-to, le-tak, le-tako, ka-li
- Pri m-ju se ji vedno zatakne. (She always falters at m (in the alphabet).)

Hyphens are used non-syntactially in syllabification, when marking stems, suffixes, prefixes and similar (many examples at declensions above) and in prices (1000,- SIT (which is the same as 1000,0 SIT)).

The same character under the name of deljaj marks word division over two lines. At the end of a line, a word may be spelt only to the end of a certain syllable, followed by the left-leaning - or = character (sometimes, although not often, the character / is also used for this purpose), with the rest of the word following in the next line. If the last character in a line is a plus (+), a dash (–), a solidus (/), a times or division sign (·, :), an equal sign (=), a hyphen (-), or similar, the same character is repeated at the beginning of the next line.

- Prišli smo do polovice odstavka, ko je Marijino jec-
  ljanje prešlo meje normale.

We read through the first half of the paragraph when Marija's stammering exceeded the boundaries of normality.

- (17 + 15) + 3 =
  = 17 + (15 + 3) =
  = 35

== Bracket ==
Syntactical use

A bracket ((), //, ||, [], <> and {}) is a two part one-side leaning punctuation mark. The introducing bracket, known as uklepaj, is right-leaning; the closing bracket, zaklepaj, is left-leaning. Round brackets are those used most often in writing.

Brackets are used to envelop text which is the following:

1. a variation or supplement: Klorovodikova kislina (HCl) je nevarna. (Hydrochloric acid (HCl) is dangerous.) Tekst (besedilo) smo prečistili. (We cleaned the text (and a more Slovene word for text in brackets).)
2. inserted sentences or clauses: Takoj zatem (če se prav spominjam) se je zabliskalo. (Straight afterwards (if I recall correctly) lightning struck.) Druga svetovna vojna (1939–45) je terjala mnogo krvi. (The second world war (1939–45) demanded much blood.) – dashes, ellipses or commas are also used in this sense
3. word parts (in this case it may be fully leaning): Spoštovani/a gost(ja)! (Dear guest! (the feminine form is what is in the brackets))

Essentially, a thing to be borne in mind is that whatever is inside brackets may be left out with no change in meaning.

The cadence of pitch before a bracket is rising (cadent) when what is inside brackets is a variation, otherwise it is falling (anticadent). If brackets contain a fully-fledged sentence, the cadence is as per the sentence punctuation.

Non-syntactical use

A terminating bracket can be used in lists:

Izberite pravilni odgovor: a) kopje, b) lokomotiva, c) disk.

(Choose the correct answer: a) spear, b) locomotive, c) discus.)

== Solidus ==
A solidus (/) is a leaning punctuation mark. It has the following meanings:

1. or: Bolezen se prepozna po rumeni/rjavkasti lisi na čelu. (The disease can be recognised by the yellow/brownish stripe on the forehead.)
2. through: Sodni zapis 55/2. (Court record 55/2.)
3. partly one thing and partly the other: Poslovno leto 2000/01 je bilo katastrofalno. (The fiscal year 2000/01 was disastrous.)
4. separating verses when written in one line (non-leaning): Ko brez miru okrog divjam, / prijatlji prašajo me, kam? (I drift in dark unrest and pain, / 'Where now?' you ask, and ask again. (France Preseren, Kam?))
