= The Anomalies =

2003 novel by Joey Goebel

- Author: Joey Goebel
- Language: English
- Genre: Novel
- Publisher: MacAdam/Cage
- Publication date: 2003
- Publication place: United States
- Media type: Print (hardback & paperback)
- Pages: 205 pp (first edition, hardback)
- ISBN: 1-931561-29-X (first edition, hardback)
- OCLC: 51293959
- Dewey Decimal: 813/.6 21
- LC Class: PS3607.O33 A56 2003
- Followed by: Torture the Artist

The Anomalies, published as The Freaks outside of the US, is a novel by Joey Goebel published in 2003.

== Plot summary ==
In a small town in Kentucky, five outsiders have come together: an eighty-year-old woman who walks around in cowboy boots and a Sex Pistols T-shirt; a beautiful woman in a wheelchair; a young Iraqi searching for the American soldier he wounded in the First Gulf War; a precocious young girl; and an extremely articulate African American, who seems to be constantly on drugs but in reality makes his way through life completely sober. Wherever the five "freaks" show up, people laugh at them. The passion that unites them is music, their shared dream is to conquer the world with their music, and together they form the power pop new wave heavy metal punk rock band known as The Anomalies. In the words of their lead singer, "The only way to make this a better place would be for God to drop the bomb." Alone they are only outsiders, but as a group they might just be the bomb that God does not want to drop...

== Release details ==
- 2003, U.S., MacAdam/Cage Publishing (ISBN 1-931561-29-X), Pub date ? April 2003, hardback (first edition)
- 2004, U.S., MacAdam/Cage Publishing (ISBN 1-931561-84-2), Pub date 30 October 2004, paperback
