= Torture the Artist =

2004 novel by Joey Goebel

- Author: Joey Goebel
- Language: English
- Genre: Novel
- Publisher: MacCage Adams Publishing
- Publication date: 2004
- Publication place: United States
- Media type: Print (hardback & paperback)
- Pages: 250 pp
- ISBN: 978-1-931561-77-8
- OCLC: 55948181
- Dewey Decimal: 813/.6 22
- LC Class: PS3607.O33 T67 2004
- Preceded by: The Anomalies
- Followed by: Commonwealth (novel)

Torture the Artist, published as Vincent outside the US, is a novel by Joey Goebel published in 2004.

== Plot summary ==
Vincent Spinetti is an archetypal tortured artist, a sensitive young writer who falls victim to alienation, parental neglect, poverty, depression, alcoholism, illness, nervous breakdowns and unrequited love. He is painfully unaware that these torments are due to the secret manipulations of New Renaissance, an experimental organization that is testing the age-old idea that art results from suffering. Since culture is so significantly influenced by music, movies, and television, New Renaissance hopes to improve the mindless mainstream by raising writers who emphasize artistic quality over commerce. As part of its top-secret sub-project, New Renaissance hires reluctant ex-musician Harlan Eiffler to manipulate its most promising prodigy, Vincent. Wickedly antisocial and deeply disgusted by what passes for entertainment in the twenty-first century, Harlan clandestinely pulls the strings so that Vincent remains a true artist. All the while, he poses as Vincent's manager, simultaneously nurturing his prolific career and torturing his soul.

== See also ==
- Joey Goebel
- The Anomalies
