= Marija Knežević =

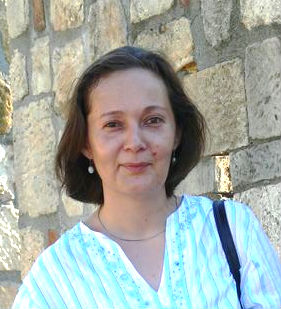
- Born: 29 December 1963; Belgrade, Yugoslavia
- Occupations: Poet, essayist, professor
- Writing career
- Notable awards: The Đura Jakšič Award

Marija Knežević (born 29 December 1963) is a Serbian poet, fiction writer, essayist, literary translator and Professor of literature.

== Biography ==
Knežević was born in Belgrade, Serbia, in 1963. She graduated from Belgrade University with a degree in Comparative Literature and Theory of Literature. She later completed her M.A. degree at Michigan State University where she also taught from 1996 to 2000. She wrote a column for the Politika newspaper.

Her poems, stories, essays, and translations appear in many domestic and international literary journals, as well as in numerous anthologies. Her poetry appeared in translation in the anthology of Serbian poetry Cat Painters, edited by Biljana Obradović and Dubravka Djurić. Her bilingual poetry collection Breathing Technique was a finalist for the 2021 Derek Walcott Poetry Prize and the 2020 Big Other Book Award for Translation.

== Selected bibliography ==
=== Poetry ===
Her poetry includes:

- Elegiac Advice to Julia, BIGZ, Belgrade. (1994)
- Things for Personal Use, Prosveta, Belgrade (1994)
- The Age of Salome, Prosveta, Belgrade. (1996)
- My Other You, Vajat, Belgrade (2001)
- Meta, Povelja, Kraljevo (2025)
- Twenty Poems about Love and One Love Poem, RAD (2003)
- Streetwalkers, RAD, (2007)
- Shen, Mali Nemo, (2011)
- Breathing Technique, Povelja, Kraljevo (2015)
- Final Poems, Povelja, Kraljevo (2020)
- My Other You, selected poems, Kontrast izdavaštvo, (2019)
- Breathing Technique, Zephyrs Press, Massachusetts, USA, bilingual English and Serbian, (2020)
- Meta, poetry, Povelja, Kraljevo (2025)

=== Prose ===
Her collection of proses include:

- Dog Food, novel published by Matica srpska, Novi Sad (1989)
- Querida, e-mail correspondence with Anika Krstić from Belgrade during bombing of Yugoslavia in 1999. Vajat; Belgrade (2001)
- The Book of Longing, Slobodna izdanja Slobodana Mašića; Belgrade. (2003)
- Das Buch vom Fehlen, bilingual, Serbian and German edition; Wieser Verlag, translation into German: Goran Novaković, Vienna. (2004)
- Ekaterini, (2005). Translation into English: Will Firth, Istros Books, London; England. (2013)
- Fabula rasa, the work on the book financed by Austrian "KulturKontakt", the author's edition; Belgrade. (2008)
- Auto, Agora; Zrenjanin. (2017)
- Sun Catcher, novel, Presing Mladenovac (2023)

== Awards ==
- The Đura Jakšič Award, 2007, for the poetry collection In tactum
- The story "Without Fear of Change" (from Fabula rasa) is included in the "Best European Fiction" edition for 2012 (Dalkey Archive Press, Illinois, US)
