= Seven Terrors =

2010 book by Selvedin Avdić

- Author: Selvedin Avdić
- Original title: Sedam Strahova
- Translator: Coral Petkovich
- Language: Bosnian
- Genre: Science fiction
- Publisher: Istros Books
- Publication date: 2010 (Bosnian); 2012 (English)
- Awards: International Dublin Literary Award nominated, longlist, 2013

Seven Terrors is a science fiction novel by Selvedin Avdić. Originally published in 2010 in Bosnian, it was translated into English by Coral Petkovich published in the UK by Istros Books in 2012.

The book, which includes themes of violence, oppression and injustice, is set in post-war Bosnia. The unnamed protagonist, while dealing with depression, navigates an underground mystical world, in search of a lost friend.

The book won praise from literary correspondents Nicholas Lezard and Eileen Battersby. It was nominated for the International Dublin Literary Award and the Science Fiction & Fantasy Translation Award.

== Publication ==
Seven Terrors is the debut novel of Bosnian writer Selvedin Avdić translated into English by Coral Petkovich in 2012. The English language publication is by Istros Books.

The book's Bosnian title is Sedam Strahova.

== Synopsis ==
The book is set in post-war Bosnia. It is narrated by an unnamed former radio journalist. The protagonist, who split with his wife 9 months prior, is struggling with depression and ethnic tensions. The protagonist meets Mirna, the daughter of an old and now missing friend Aleksa and helps her navigate a mystical underground.

Themes in the book include systemic violence, worker oppression, and injustice.

== Critical reception ==
Nicholas Lezard writing in The Guardian described the book as "remarkable" and states that "This is a story that starts off weird and gets weirder, but with the logic and clamminess of a bad dream. It's quite unlike anything I've read before, but it has all the consistency and force of something major and assured" Ali Alizadeh, writing in the Sydney Review of Books calls the novel "gripping", "spinechilling," and "a terrifically compelling discourse on war, violence and humanity's dark heart". The Irish Times' literary correspondent Eileen Battersby described the book as witty and surreal.

The book was longlisted for the International Dublin Literary Award in 2013 and shortlisted for the Science Fiction & Fantasy Translation Awards 2013. Literalab identified the book their number one on a list of 15 best books of 2012.
