= Irina Denezhkina =

Russian writer (born 1981)

Irina Denezhkina (Russian: Ирина Денежкина; born October 31, 1981) is a Russian controversial writer, notable for a vulgar style of her works, which is explained by some as a reflection of the modern reality, as of the Millennial Generation (e.g. her most famous collected stories Give Me [Songs for Lovers], Russian: "Дай мне!", published by Limbus Press in 2002).

She was born in Yekaterinburg. Her first works, signed by a pseudonym Niger's sister (сестра Нигера), appeared on the Internet in 2000. At the beginning of 2004, her book was published in the United States. In 2008, she was the recipient of Romania's Ovid Festival Prize, awarded to a prominent young talent.
