= Selvedin Avdić =

Bosnian

- Born: 1969 (age 56–57); Zenica, Bosnia and Herzegovina
- Occupations: Writer; journalist; editor
- Writing career
- Notable work: Seven Terrors

Selvedin Avdić (born 1969) is a Bosnian writer, journalist, and editor from Zenica, Bosnia and Herzegovina. He is best known for his debut novel Seven Terrors (2010), which received international acclaim and was longlisted for the International Dublin Literary Award in 2013. Avdić has also published short stories, biographies, and novels, and he serves as editor-in-chief of the independent online magazine Žurnal.

== Biography ==
Avdić was born in 1969 in Zenica, Bosnia and Herzegovina. He lives and works in Zenica as a writer and journalist, and is editor-in-chief of the online magazine Žurnal.

His first book was the short story collection Podstanari i drugi fantomi (Tenants and Other Phantoms) published in 2004. Beyond fiction, he has written nonfiction on Bosnian topics, including a cultural/guide book on Jajce and an edited volume about the Zenica prison.

His book Moja fabrika (My Factory) was published by Vrijeme in 2013 and focuses on the industrial and social history of Zenica's steelworks; it has been adapted for the stage as Moja Fabrika / My Factory (dir. Selma Spahić).

Avdić has also worked in radio: he edits the show Free Flight on BH Radio, as noted by the Dublin Literary Award author profile.

== Literary career and reception ==
Avdić's best-known work is the novel Seven Terrors (Sedam strahova), first published in 2010. The English translation by Coral Petkovich was released by Istros Books in 2012. The novel, which combines elements of psychological drama, social commentary, and surrealism, was longlisted for the 2013 International Dublin Literary Award.

Nicholas Lezard in The Guardian praised the book as “remarkable … like nothing I’ve ever read before,” highlighting how it illuminates the Bosnian war through the logic of dreams and nightmares.

His later novel, Kap veselja (A Drop of Joy, 2018), has also been announced for publication in English translation.

Another book by Avdić, Autobusne bilješke (Jesenski & Turk, 2020), is a collection of short reflective prose written during bus journeys and stationary moments, including a section titled “Putovanja po sobi” created during lockdowns when intercity travel was suspended. The work emphasizes observation of people, small details, and inner life, inviting readers to slow down and notice everyday landscapes and experiences. Critical reception notes its timely resonance with readers grappling with the pandemic and its interruption of mobility.

== Selected works ==
- Stanari i drugi fantomi (Tenants and Other Phantoms, 2004) – short story collection
- Moja fabrika (My Factory, 2009) – biography of Zenica
- Sedam strahova (Seven Terrors, 2010) – novel; English translation (2012) by Coral Petkovich
- Kap veselja (A Drop of Joy, 2018) – novel
- Autobusne bilješke (Bus Notes), Jesenski & Turk, 2020
