= Ovid Prize =

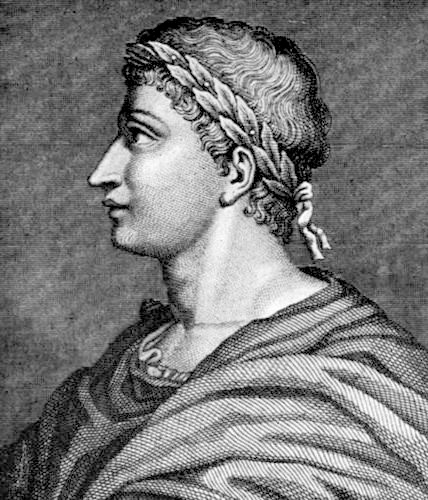
- Imaginary depiction of Ovid with laurel wreath (from an engraving)
- Location: Neptun, Romania
- Presented by: Romanian Cultural Institute and Romanian Writers' Union
- Rewards: €10,000 Ovid Prize; €5,000 Ovid Festival Prize
- First award: 2002
- Website: www.uniuneascriitorilor.ro

The Ovid Prize was a literary prize awarded annually between 2002 and 2011 by the Romanian Cultural Institute and the Romanian Writers' Union to an author from any country, in recognition of a body of work. It was named in honour of the Roman poet Ovid, who died in exile in the former Greek Black Sea colony of Tomis (today's Constanța in Romania). Laureates were awarded 10,000 euros.

The Ovid Festival Prize, worth 5,000 euros, was established in 2002. Recipients include George Szirtes, Tomaž Šalamun, and Ismail Kadare. The prize underwent a change of mandate in 2007. Starting from 2008, it was awarded to a prominent young talent. In 2012 the prize was suspended due to lack of money.

== History ==
Both Prizes are the joint initiative of the Writers' Union of Romania and the Romanian Cultural Institute (Romanian: Institutul Cultural Român). The winners are nominated by the Festival jury. The awards ceremony takes place during the Days and Nights of Literature Festival (Romanian: Zile și nopți de literatură) held jointly in Neptun and Mangalia in June. The Prize is also referred to as the Ovidius Prize.

Past recipients include Orhan Pamuk, Andrei Codrescu, Amos Oz, Jorge Semprún and António Lobo Antunes.

The 2011 Laureate was the Czech writer Milan Kundera. In a letter addressed to the chairman of the jury, Kundera, who could not attend the ceremony, accepted the award. Kundera donated the prize to Humanitas Publishing House, which has published most of his works in a Romanian translation, with the mention that the money should go to assisting Romanian literature.

The 2012 edition was cancelled due to lack of funds.

== List of laureates ==
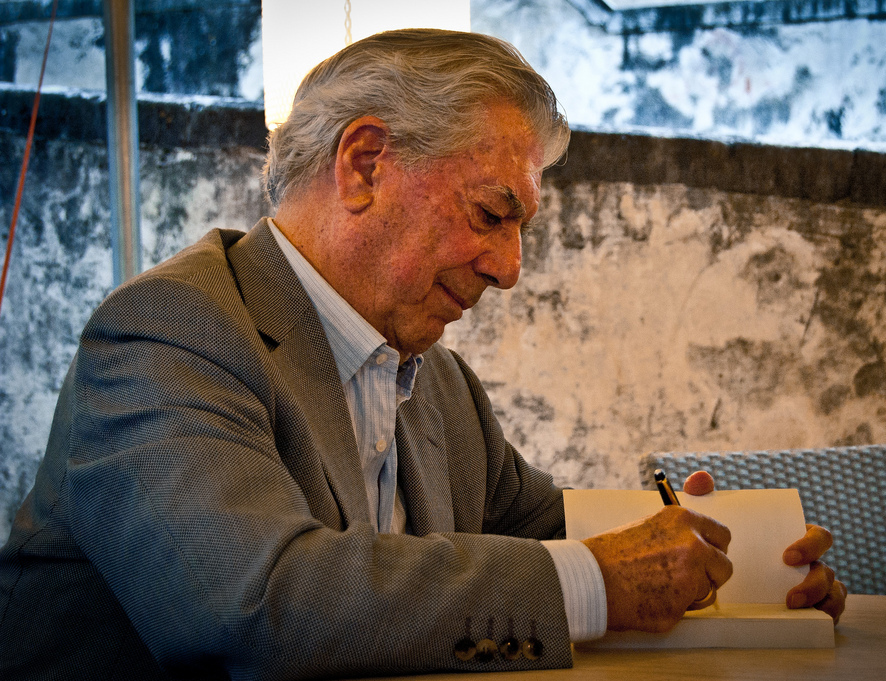
Mario Vargas Llosa

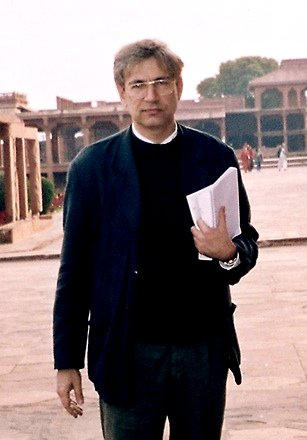
Orhan Pamuk

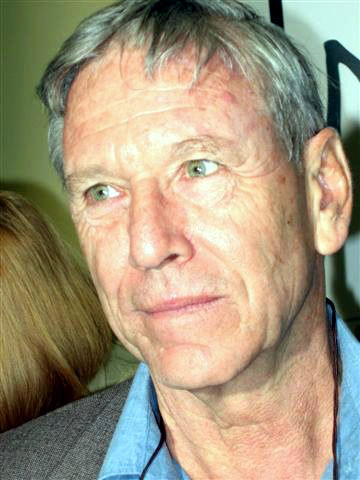
Amos Oz

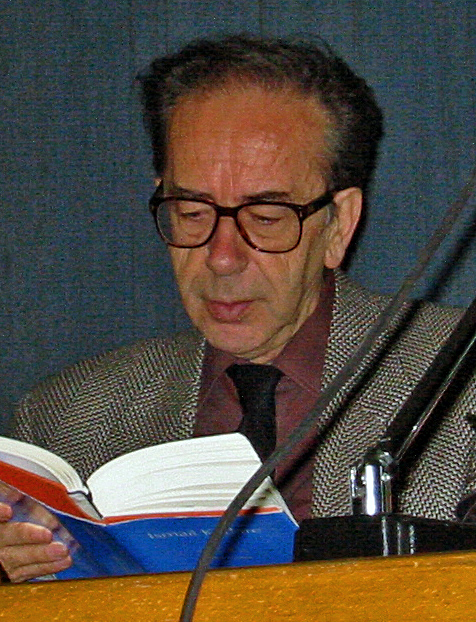
Ismail Kadare

=== 2011 ===
- Milan Kundera, France
- Ognjen Spahić, Montenegro

=== 2010 ===
- Jean d'Ormesson, France
- Madeleine Thien, Canada

=== 2009 ===
- Péter Esterházy, Hungary
- Joey Goebel, USA

=== 2008 ===
- Orhan Pamuk, Turkey
- Irina Denezhkina, Russia

=== 2007 ===
- Yevgeny Yevtushenko, Russia

=== 2006 ===
- Andrei Codrescu, USA/Romania
- George Szirtes, Great Britain

=== 2005 ===
- Mario Vargas Llosa, Peru
- Cengiz Bektaş, Turkey

=== 2004 ===
- Amos Oz, Israel
- Tomaž Šalamun, Slovenia

=== 2003 ===
- António Lobo Antunes, Portugal
- Ismail Kadare, Albania

=== 2002 ===
- Jorge Semprún, Spain
- Alain Robbe-Grillet, France

== See also ==
- List of literary awards
- List of poetry awards
