= The Poetry Lesson =

2010 book by Andrei Codrescu

- Cover
- Author: Andrei Codrescu
- Language: English
- Genre: Novel/Memoir
- Publisher: Princeton University Press
- Publication date: October 20, 2010
- Publication place: United States
- Pages: 128
- ISBN: 978-0-691-14724-6
- Preceded by: The Posthuman Dada Guide: Tzara and Lenin Play Chess (2009)

The Poetry Lesson is a 2010 book by Romanian-American poet and commentator Andrei Codrescu published by Princeton University Press. The work recounts a single three-hour session of an Introduction to Poetry Writing class taught by a professor on the eve of retirement at a Louisiana university. Neither a conventional novel nor a straightforward memoir, the narrative blends classroom scenes with digressions into the professor's memories of poets and the literary counterculture of the 1960s and 1970s. The central pedagogical device involves assigning each student a deceased or living poet as a "Ghost-Companion" to study throughout the semester. Codrescu wrote the book during his final year teaching at Louisiana State University, where he had been a professor of English for twenty-five years.

== Background ==
Codrescu wrote The Poetry Lesson during his final year of teaching at Louisiana State University, where he had taught literature and creative writing for twenty-five years before retiring in 2009. In an interview with Mark Spitzer and students at the University of Central Arkansas, Codrescu explained that he composed the book "in the hours after teaching his undergraduate poetry seminar." He described the work as "a lived piece of reportage, in one sense, an autobiographical invention on the other, and a meditation on poetry scenes that had a bearing on the 'lesson.'"

The book is based on his experience in American poetry education, which dated back to the 1970s. In 1979, while a visiting scholar at Johns Hopkins University, he conducted poetry workshops at local schools, including McDonogh School in Baltimore, where he led students outdoors to observe their surroundings rather than work from textbooks. His teaching approach emphasized spontaneity and sensory awareness over conventional instruction.

Codrescu's pedagogical approach in The Poetry Lesson reflects his engagement with Dadaist principles, which he explored at length in The Posthuman Dada Guide: Tzara and Lenin Play Chess (Princeton University Press, 2009) one year before The Poetry Lesson. In a 2009 essay for Inside Higher Ed titled "Dada in the Classroom", Codrescu described implementing Dada-inspired experimental assignments in his poetry workshops, such as having students write words on fruit which they then read aloud, rotated among classmates, and consumed as a form of performance art. He explained that such exercises demonstrated that "poetry can be edible," that "fruit is a sexier medium than paper or pixels," and that "school could be fun." The Posthuman Dada Guide articulates Codrescu's view that Dada's anti-authoritarian ethos and emphasis on spontaneity, play, and provocation provided a model for subverting conventional academic instruction—principles that underpin the unconventional teaching methods dramatized in The Poetry Lesson.

In discussing the book's composition, Codrescu said that writing it made him realize "just how boring 'teaching creative writing' is these days, and how many unimaginative drones who were themselves 'taught' by unimaginative drones are fouling the air in our institutions of so-called 'higher' learning." He described the work as using "some composite of youths of the 21st century" and writing "without fear of digression because I would inevitably return to class the next week and come back to my characters."

Codrescu's teaching philosophy, as shown in the book, rejected conventional academic approaches to poetry instruction. He told interviewers that he preferred to focus on "playing and instructing students in the poetic mode, in thinking poetically, and even living that way." He. said that the book emerged from his conviction that poetry education had become overly institutionalized and his desire to capture what he saw as the freewheeling, experimental spirit of an earlier era of American poetry.

== Summary ==
The book recounts the first day of an Introduction to Poetry Writing class taught by a poetry professor on the eve of retirement at a Louisiana university. The narrative unfolds over a single three-hour class session, though it frequently digresses into the professor's memories, philosophical reflections, and anecdotes about poets and teaching.

The book opens on the day the university tests its text-message alert system, prompting the professor to assign his students the task of writing daily epitaphs. He introduces "The Tools of Poetry," a list that includes unconventional items such as a goatskin notebook for recording dreams, a Mont Blanc fountain pen preferably once owned by Madame Blavatsky, a Chinese coin for pocket-rubbing, and susceptibility to hypnosis. He follows this with "The Ten Muses of Poetry," all variations on mishearing, misunderstanding, and other forms of creative misapprehension, concluding with the Mississippi River.

The central pedagogical device of the class involves assigning each student a "Ghost-Companion"—a deceased or living poet whose last name begins with the same letter as the student's surname. As the professor distributes these poetic mentors, the narrative weaves between the present-day classroom and his recollections of encounters with poets, including visits to the graves of John Keats in Rome, Ezra Pound in Venice, and meetings with Aimé Césaire in Martinique and Lawrence Ferlinghetti in San Francisco. Each student assignment occasions a digression: Matthew Borden's family cemetery housed in a decommissioned nuclear silo in North Dakota leads to speculations about poets' burial sites; the assignment of Allen Ginsberg prompts reflections on sexuality and the Beat Generation; discussions of Jack Kerouac raise questions about literary inheritance and the responsibilities of teaching.

Throughout the session, a black cat enters the classroom and is named Sappho by the students, becoming an impromptu class mascot. The professor contemplates his students' futures, oscillating between compassion and cynicism about their prospects. He reflects on the nature of time, especially the obsolescence of technology and his own status as what he terms an "anachronism" or "fossil" in relation to his students' digital-native world.

The narrative incorporates the professor's memories of the poetry scene in New York during the 1960s and 1970s, including poker games in Paul Blackburn's apartment, arguments about Lawrence Ferlinghetti with Ted Berrigan, and the evolution of the literary underground. He discusses the economics of poetry, the relationship between fame and immortality, and the challenge of teaching an art form he describes as fundamentally concerned with "the pursuit of the Inexplicable."

The work concludes with the assignment of the final Ghost-Companions, including a student absent from class who receives "the Sphinx" via email, and the professor carrying the cat home. The entire narrative maintains an ambiguous status between memoir and fiction, with the professor acknowledging at various points that he invents and redistributes his experiences among imaginary characters, while simultaneously insisting on the authenticity of his teaching methods and memories.

== Reviews ==
In his review, Ron Slate described the work as "altogether entertaining" and praised Codrescu's "pedagogical-memorialistic mode". He considered the professor's behavior and teaching techniques unpredictable. Slate observed that while students attended to fulfill a requirement, readers were offered "comically inspired refreshment and some laughs." Slate remarked that Codrescu's narrative voice was "confident in its charming idiosyncrasies, spicier than his NPR pieces," and said that the book was about "Codrescu's prickly narrative voice and the delight he takes in blabbing."

Alex Good deemed the work as "a fast-paced bit of pedagogical stand-up" that blurred the line between inner and outer monologues. Good found the Ghost-Companion assignment to be "one way, and an engaging way at that, of imagining the sort of endeavour Codrescu is engaged in, which is the forging of a literary tradition." Good welcomed how the book made "a witty and heartfelt case for poetry's end being its beginning," despite an undertow of gloom about poets making a living only by talking about poetry rather than writing it.

Tien Nguyen noted that the prose remained "fluid and humorous" though "slightly rushed at times," and praised how the professor "charms both his students and his readers with stories of poets ranging from Blake to Burroughs." Nguyen stressed how Codrescu "has presented a piece that simultaneously mocks, criticizes, and commemorates the literary world while inviting all its genres to play a part." Nguyen remarked that the narrative "teeters between fiction and nonfiction," with the professor eventually addressing this ambiguity directly in the text.

In his review, Josh Cook suggested that the work might be best read "as one reads Plato's Dialogues," where characters and settings serve as "support structures for ideas." Cook acknowledged that this analogy was problematic because "the core projects of philosophy and poetry are so different," and proposed that Codrescu might have attempted "to write a Ghost-Companion" itself. The reviewer considered the work "brilliant" and "filled with sentences and images you'd want hung on your study walls for occasional contemplation". Cook predicted its statements would frequently appear as epigraphs in other poets' works.

Marjorie Perloff, writing primarily about a later poetry collection, opened by calling the earlier work "a delicious parody of the college poetry workshop" that Codrescu "turns into a hilarious comedy as the ignorant but technologically sophisticated students teach their professor a thing or two." She noted that Codrescu's "sardonic wit" and "ability to pinpoint the absurdities of our culture and to laugh at himself in the bargain" were well-known to his NPR audience.
