= Antonio Gamoneda =

Spanish poet (born 1931)

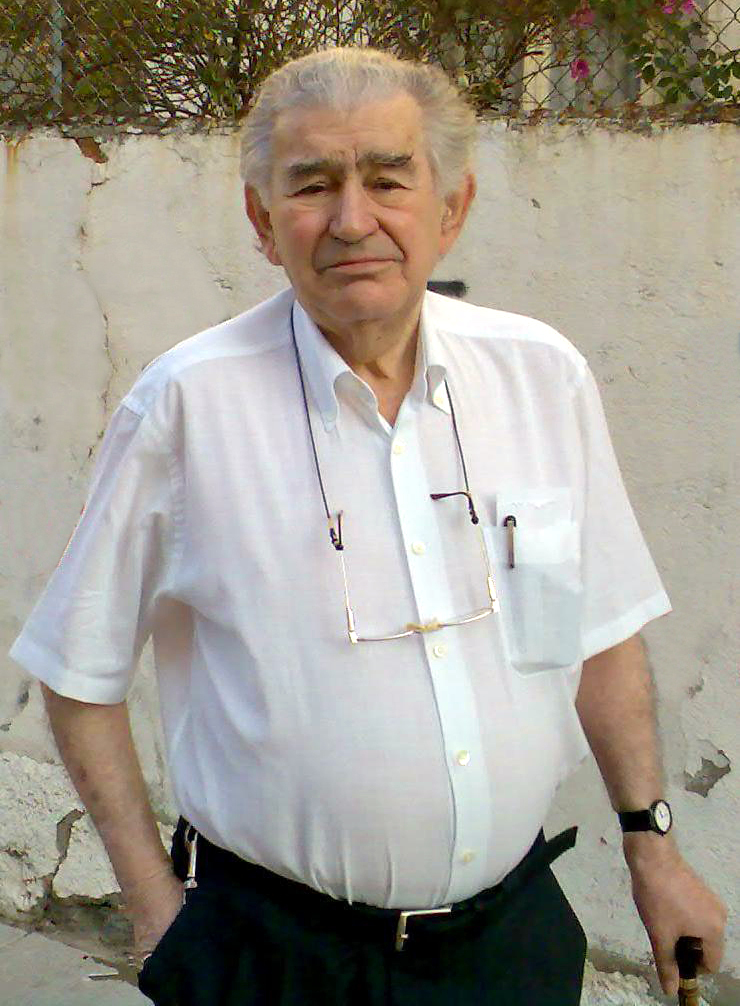
- León, 2007
- Born: Antonio Gamoneda Lobón; 30 May 1931 (age 95); Oviedo Asturias, Spain
- Occupation: Poet
- Writing career
- Notable awards: Miguel de Cervantes Prize; 2006

Antonio Gamoneda Lobón (born 30 May 1931) is a Spanish poet, winner of the Cervantes Prize in 2006.

== Biography ==
Antonio Gamoneda was born in Oviedo, Asturias, on 30 May 1931. His father, also named Antonio, was a modernist poet who published only one book, Otra más alta vida (Another higher life) in 1919. In 1934, already an orphan, he moved with his mother, Amelia Lobon, to León. The presence of his mother as a refuge from the horror and misery of war is seen in all his poetry. In 1936, with schools closed due to the Spanish Civil War, he became literate by reading, on his own, his father's book.

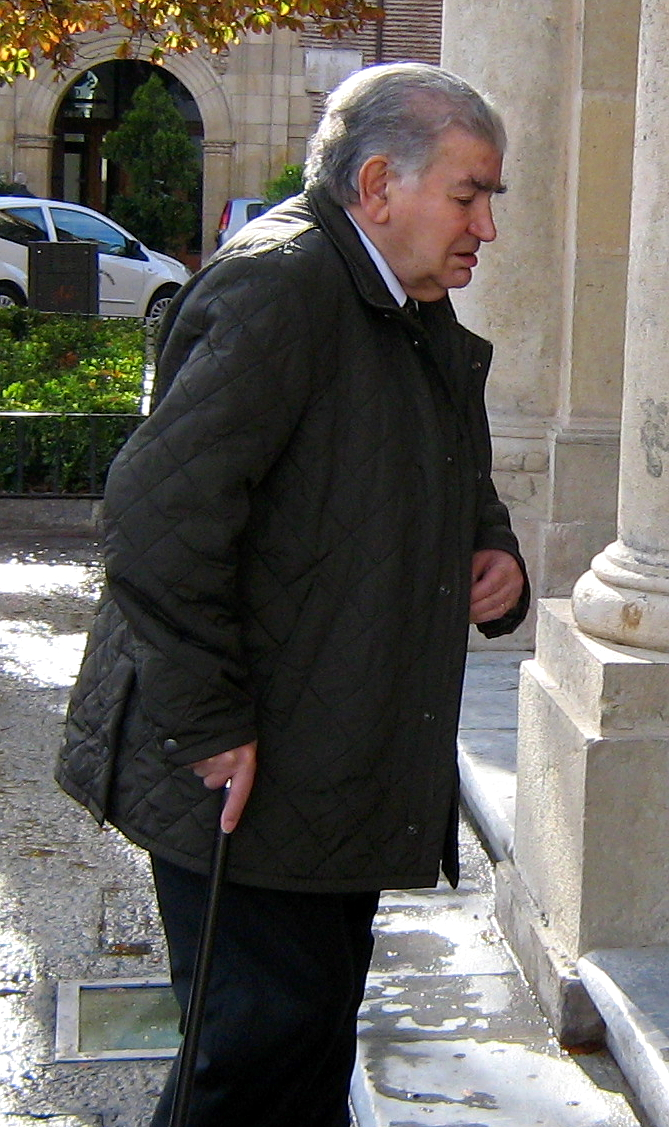
Antonio Gamoneda in León

The poet lived originally in the main working-class district of León. This place was a privileged post to observe the repression carried out during the war and postwar years.

In 1941, he joined the religious school of the Augustinian Fathers and in 1943 dropped out.

The day he turned fourteen he started working as a messenger in the Banco de Comercio. He completed his pre-university studies on his own and remained in the condition of bank employee for twenty-four years until 1969.

While working at the bank he became part of the intellectual resistance to the dictatorship of Francisco Franco. He published his first book in 1960, Sublevación inmóvil (Motionless revolt), a work that was a runner-up for the Adonais prize. The book was a break from the traditional realistic rules of the time in Spain. In 1969 he started running the cultural services of the Diputación Provincial de León, and from 1970, the León State collection of poetry, trying to promote a progressive culture with the money of the dictatorship. He was deprived of his official status, and subsequently readmitted, by court order. During these years he began working regularly in different cultural magazines.

This first stage was followed by eight years absence from the poetry world, years strongly marked by the death of the dictator Francisco Franco and the beginning of the so-called "transición". The ideological and existential crisis of the poet is felt in his next book Descripción de la mentira (A description of the lie), León 1977, a long poem that marked a shift towards a total maturity. Later publications are Lápidas (Tombstones) (Madrid, 1987) and Edad (Age), a volume collecting all his poetry until 1987, revised by the author, and that won the National Prize for Literature in Spain.

In 1992, Libro del frío (Book of the cold) was published, making him one of the most important poets in Spanish. In the year 2000 the final version of this work came out, which included Frío de límites (Cold of Limits), a work in collaboration with Antoni Tàpies.

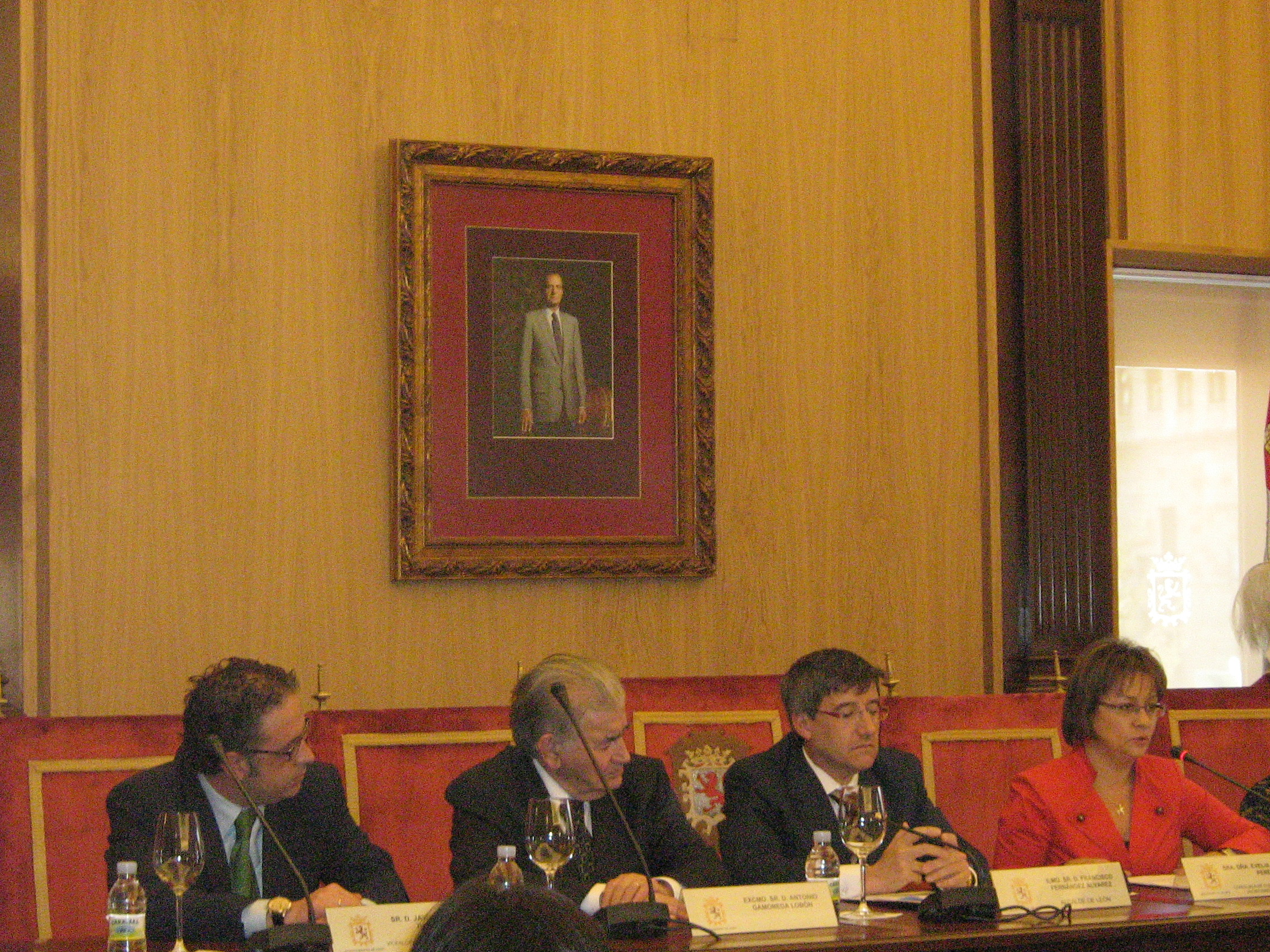
Antonio Gamoneda City Hall of Leon in November 2007

Arden las pérdidas (Losses are burning) was published in 2003, a book that crowns the period started in Descripción de la mentira. After that he published Cecilia (2004), named after his granddaughter, and La luz: Collected Poetry: (1947–2004), (2004).

In 2005, he was award the inaugural European Prize for Literature. In 2006, he was awarded the Reina Sofia Award, and the Cervantes Prize, the highest honor in Spanish literature.

He has also been awarded the Gold Medal of the city of Pau, the Silver Medal of Asturias, the "Lete" Gold Medal of the Province of León and the Gold Medal of the Círculo de Bellas Artes. He is Doctor Honoris Causa by the University of León.

The documentary Antonio Gamoneda: Escritura y alquimia premiered in March 2009. It was directed by Enrique and Cesar Rendueles Corti, with script by Amalia Iglesias and Julia Piera.

== Books of poems in Spanish ==
- Sublevación inmóvil [Motionless revolt]. Madrid, Rialp 1960
- Descripción de la mentira [A description of the lie]. 1st ed. León, Diputación Provincial, col. County, 1977. 2nd ed. Salamanca, col. Barrio de Maravillas, 1986. 3rd ed. with a text by Julián Jiménez Heffernan Madrid, Abada Editores, 2003. 4th ed. with a text by Julián Jiménez Heffernan Madrid, Abada Editores, 2003.
- León de la mirada [León of the sight]. 1st ed. León, Espadaña 1979. 2nd ed. León, Diputación Provincial, col. Breviarios de la Calle del Pez, 1990.
- Tauromaquia y destino [Tauromachy and destination]. [with drawings by Juan Barjola] León, Retablo, 1980.
- Blues castellano [Castilian Blues] (1961–1966). 1st ed. Gijón Noega, 1982. 2nd ed. Barcelona, Plaza y Janes, 1999. 3rd ed. Madrid, Bartleby, 2007.
- Lápidas [Gravestones]. Madrid, Trieste, 1986. 2nd ed. Madrid, Abada, 2006 [with an epilogue by Julián Jiménez Heffernan].
- Edad [Age] Poetry 1947–1986. 1st ed. Miguel Casado (editor and foreword). Madrid, chair, 1987 [REIMP. 1988 1988 1989 2000].
- Libro del frío [Book of the cold]. 1st ed. Madrid, Siruela 1992. 2nd ed. [foreword by Jacques Ancet] Valencia, Germany 2000 [ed. Revised and expanded]. 3rd ed. Madrid, Siruela 2003 [ed. revised]. 4th ed. Madrid, Siruela 2006 [ed. revised].
- Mortal 1936. Mérida, Asamblea de Extremadura 1994.
- El vigilante de la nieve [The snow-watcher]. Lanzarote, Fundación César Manrique, col. Penola White, 1995.
- Libro de los venenos: corrupción y fábula del Libro Sexto de Pedacio Dioscórides y Andrés de Laguna, acerca de los venenos mortíferos y de las fieras que arrojan de sí ponzoña [Book of Poisons: corruption and the fable of Book Six Pedacio Dioscorides and Andres de Laguna, about deadly poisons and the beasts that throw them]. 1st ed. Madrid, Ediciones Siruela, 1995. 2nd ed. Madrid, Siruela 1997. 3rd ed. Madrid, Siruela 2006.
- Arden las pérdidas [Losses are burning]. 1st ed. Barcelona, Tusquets, 2003. 2nd ed. Barcelona, Tusquets, 2004.
- Cecilia. Lanzarote, Fundación César Manrique, col. Penola White, 2004.
- Reescritura [Rewriting]. Madrid, Abada, 2004.
- Esta luz [This light]. Collected poetry (1947–2004). Epilogue by Miguel Casado Barcelona, Galaxia Gutenberg / Círculo de Lectores, 2004 [REIMP. 2005 2006]
- Extravío en la luz [Lost in the light], Madrid, Casariego, 2009 edition of six previously unpublished poems, with engravings by Juan Carlos Mestre.

== Books of poems translated ==
- Pierres gravées [Gravestones]. Jacques Ancet (translator and foreword), Paris, France, Lettres Vives, 1996.
- Substances, limites. Nimphea. [with photos by Michel Hanique] Jacques Ancet (translator), Toulouse, France, Le Grand Os, 1997.
- Livro do frio [Book of cold]. José Bento (translator), Lisbon, Portugal, Assírio & Alvim, 1998.
- Froid de limites [Cold of limits]. Jacques Ancet (translator), Paris, France, Lettres Vives, 2000.
- Mortel 1936. Passion et lumière de Juan Barjola (Mortal 1936. Passion and light in Juan Barjola). Jacques Ancet (translator), Europe. Revue littéraire mensuelle (Paris, France) 852 (2000) 102–109.
- Beskrivning av lögnen [A description of the lie]. Ulf Eriksson (translator), Artes, Stockholm, Sweden, 3 (2002) 76–111.
- Pétale blessé [Injured petal]. [with an original painting of Claire Pichaud] Claude Houy (translator), Barriac en Rouergue, Trames, France, 2002.
- Ardem as perdas [Losses are burning]. Jorge Melícias (translator), Vila Nova de Famalicão, Portugal, Quasi, 2004.
- Blues castillan [Castilian Blues]. Jacques Ancet (translator), Paris, France, Corti, 2004.
- De l´impossibilité [Of the impossibility]. [with engraves by Jean-Louis Fauthoux and foreword by Salah Stétié] Amelia Gamoneda (translator), Montpellier, France, Fata Morgana, 2004.
- Description du mensonge [A description of the lie]. Jacques Ancet (foreword and translation), Paris, France, Corti, 2004.
- Im ki kvar meuhar [Even though is late. Anthology]. Rami Saari (foreword and translation), Jerusalem, Israel, Carmel, 2004.
- Passion du regard [Passion of light]. Jacques Ancet (foreword and translation), Paris, Lettres Vives, 2004.
- Boek van de kou [Book of cold]. Bart Vonck (translator), Leuven, Belgium, Vlaams Fonds voor de Letteren, 2005.
- Livre du froid [Book of cold]. 1st ed. Jean-Yves Bériou and Martine Joulia (translators), Paris, Antoine Soriano Éditeur, 1996. 2nd ed. [with a foreword by Pierre Peuchmaurd] Paris, Antoine Soriano Éditeur, France, 2005.
- Cecilia. Jacques Ancet (translator), Paris, France, Lettres Vives, 2006.
- Clarté sans repos [Restless clearness]. Jacques Ancet (foreword and translation), Paris, France, Arfuyen, 2006.
- Kitab al-bard [Book of cold]. Almahdi Akhrif (foreword and translation), Casablanca, Morocco. Publicaciones del Ministerio de la Cultura.
- Dieses Licht [This light]. Eine Anhologie 1947–2005. Manfred Bös, Petre Strien-Bourmer, Karina Gómez-Montero (translators) [epilogue by Javier Gómez-Montero], Kiel, Germany, Ludwig, 2007.
- Descriçao da mentira [A description of the lie]. Vasco Gato (translator), Vila Nova de Famalicão, Portugal, Quasi, 2007.
- Förlusterna Glöder [Losses are burning]. Ulf Eriksson translator, Bokförlaget Tranan, Stockholm, 2007.
- Gravestones [Lápidas]. Donald Wellman translator, University of New Orleans Press, New Orleans, 2009.
- Description of the Lie [Descripción de la mentira]. Donald Wellman translator, Talisman House Publishers, Greenfield 2014.

== Essays ==
- "Poesía y conciencia. Notas para una revisión", Ínsula, 204, Madrid, 1963.
- "El tema del agua en la poesía hispánica". León, Fray Bernardino de Sahagún, 1972.
- "Poesía, situación, utilidad", República de las Letras, 23, Madrid, 1989, 27–29.
- "Sobre la utilidad de la poesía provinciana", República de las Letras, 24, Madrid, 1989, 165–167.
- "El arte de la memoria", El Urogallo 71, Madrid, 1992, 12-13
- "Aquella primera pasión de la lectura", in Álvaro Ruiz de la Peña (ed.), Páginas de viva voz. Leer y escribir hoy. Oviedo, Universidad de Oviedo, 1995, 69–81.
- "La poésie dans la perspective de la mort", en Bernard Noël (ed.), Qu’est-ce que la poésie? Paris, Éditions Jean-Michel Place/Ville de Saint-Denis, 1995, 228–230.
- "Una lectura posesiva de Jorge Guillén", in Francisco Javier Blasco (ed.), Jorge Guillén, el hombre y la obra. Valladolid, 1995, 293–296.
- "El cuerpo de los símbolos (Memoria, poética, ensayo)". 1st ed. Madrid, Huerga y Fierro, 1997, 2ª ed., Mexico, Calamus, 2007.
- "¿Existe o existió la Generación del Cincuenta?", in several authors, II Congreso de Poesía canaria. Hacia el próximo siglo. Gran Canaria, Caja Canarias, 1997, 29–32.
- "La creación poética: radicación, espacios, límites", en Ignacio Castro (ed.), Informes sobre el estado del lugar. Gijón, Caja de Asturias, 1998, 113–124.
- "¿Poesía en los años 2000?", La alegría de los naufragios, 1–2, Madrid, 1999, 25–28.
- "Valente: de la contemplación de la muerte", Cuadernos Hispanoamericanos, 600, Madrid, 2000, 7–10.
- "Del sentir invisible de Marga Clark", Quimera, 187, Madrid, 2000, 19–22.
- "Conocimiento, revelación, lenguajes". León, IES. "Lancia", col. Cuadernos del noroeste, 2000.
- "Hablo con Blanca Varela" [epilogue], en Blanca Varela, Obra reunida, Barcelona, Galaxia Gutenberg/Círculo de Lectores, 2001, 265–278.
- "Memoria de Valente", ABC/Cultural, Madrid 3/9/2001.
- "Luis Cernuda: el poeta y el crítico", in Nuria Martínez de Castilla y James Valender (editors), 100 años de Luis Cernuda. Madrid, Publicaciones de la Residencia de Estudiantes, 2002, 223–231.
- "Poesía y literatura: ¿límites?" in José Enrique Martínez Fernández (ed.), Estudios de literatura comparada: norte y sur, la sátira, transferencia y recepción de géneros y formas textuales. León, Universidad de León, 2002, 33–42.
- "Presencias de la poesía europea", Moenia, Lugo, 2004, 5-16
- "Poesía, existencia, muerte", in Antonio Gamoneda (ed.), Atravesando olvido. Antología personal. Mexico, Editorial Aldus, 2004, 207–221. French translation: "Poésie, existence, mort", Europe París, 875, 2002, 94–104.
- "Las lágrimas de Claudio", Archipiélago, 63, Barcelona, 2004, 21-24
- "Prólogo", en César Antonio Molina, El rumor del tiempo. Barcelona, Galaxia Gutenberg/Círculo de Lectores, 2006, 7–13.
- "Quelques mots sur la poésie", Europe, París, 928–929, 2006, 223–226.
- "Sur la poésie. Discours de réception du Prix Européen de Littérature 2006" suivi de Tombées (5 poèmes inédits). Jacques Ancet (translation), Mesnil-sur-Estrée, Librairie La Hune/Arfuyen, 2006.
- "Ángel González: un histórico", La voz de Asturias, Oviedo, 3/2/2008.
- "Valente : texto y contexto", Santiago de Compostela, Servizo de Publicacións e Intercambio Científico Campus Universitario Sur, 2007.
- "Pórtico", en Nâzim Hikmet, Poemas finales. Ültimos poemas II 1962–1963. Madrid, Ediciones del Oriente y del Mediterráneo, 2008.ra física de María Ruiz" [The physical adventure of María Ruiz], in Cuentos. León, Caja de Ahorros, 1968.
- "Relación de Don Sotero" [Relationship of Don Sotero], Los Cuadernos del Norte (Oviedo) 31, 1985, 74–76. Published again in Santos Alonso (ed.), Figuraciones. León, Diputación Provincial, 1986, 135–145.
- "Relación y fábula" ("Relación de Don Sotero" y "Fábula de Pieter") [Relationship of Don Sotero and Pieter's short-story] . Santander, EditoriaLímite, 1997.
- Un armario lleno de sombra [A wardrobe full of shadows, Autobiography], Galaxia Gutenberg - Círculo de Lectores, Madrid, 2009.

== Books with plastic artists ==
- "Lapidario incompleto" [Incomplete lapidary], in Antonio Gamoneda, Luis Mateo Díez, José Maria Merino, León: traza y memoria. [with engravings by Félix Cárdenas] Madrid, Antonio Machón, 1984, 11–40.
- Encuentro en el territorio del frío [Encounter in the land of cold]. [with drawings by Albert Agulló and foreword by José Gómez Isla] León, Instituto Leonés de Cultura, 1995.
- Eros y Thanatos. [paintings by Álvaro Delgado with eleven poems by Antonio Gamoneda] Madrid, Círculo de Bellas Artes, 1999.
- ¿Tú? [You?] [with engravings by Antoni Tàpies] Madrid, Ed. T/ Antonio Machón, 1999.
- Más allá de la sombra [Beyond the shadow]. [Bernardo Sanjurjo, Obra gráfica, 1999–2002. Antonio Gamoneda, Poemas, 2002] Oviedo, Museo de Bellas Artes de Asturias, 2002.
- Memoria volcánica [Volcanic memory]. [with engravings by Amaya Bozal] Madrid, Ediciones Sen, 2002.
- Extravío en la luz [Lost in light] with engravings by Juan Carlos Mestre and forewords by Amelia Gamoneda, Madrid, Casariego, 2008.

== Critical reception ==
Critical reception to Gamoneda's poetry has been positive since the poet began to publish:

"Gamoneda's word is tight and solid, as emerging from silence to remain within it, to return to it, a word as if detached from the wasteland, from the contemplation of a desolate landscape, born from the cold expansion to leave its melancholy record of stripping ... The poetry of Antonio Gamoneda has the nakedness of existence."

"Antonio Gamoneda has become a guide and model for younger poets, who value his linguistic wisdom and his openness to the traditions of modernity, an openness stemming from the assumption of personal and collective history."

"Antonio Gamoneda meets Trakl's expressionism, Rubén Darío's modernism and Lorca's later period. Regarding Lorca, Gamoneda is undoubtedly the only one who dares to follow suit."

"A voice tested and immersed and submerged in time, in the hallucinogenic unpredictability of the Spanish historical circumstance, turned around the spacious event of a "poetic life" followed by Gamoneda; but a voice that also occupies with authority its own place in the vast field of Spanish literature, and that takes its place, running the conquest of his space and most genuine figure in a quiet strategy whose secret is delay, silence (and some exile), and which is supported by all levels of legitimacy one can think of [...]."

"There are three pillars, insistently repeated by the poet in [his] writings, on which stands the height of his poetic thought: - The self-reference, intrareference says the poets, nature of the poetic word whose meaning and reality do not cross toward an external reference. - A poetic language filled with music ( 'The poetic thought is a thought that sings'). - The poetic language enters into intelligibility under the condition of sensitive images." "Antonio Gamoneda

"Gamoneda does not develop a story, even when he announces he will do it. Facts are fragmented into sensations, isolated in details from its context, carrying echoes of earlier times. His glace is constrained to an obsessive nucleus, that drives it centripetally towards what the poet calls internalization. Only the events internalized matter - scarce, hurtful - and they offer their stiff-necked recurrence, their metamorphosis, their staying...It is a peculiar sort of autobiographical way, non narrative or directly referential, but woven in the constant images and the center of interest, the elements that became emblematic, the figures and individuals. It is a minimalist and repetitive dynamic ... that is imposed on the complete reading of the work."

== Critical bibliography ==
- ALONSO, María Nieves, Partes iguales de vértigo y olvido. La poesía de Antonio Gamoneda. Madrid, Calambur, 2005.
- ALONSO, Santos, "Edad, de Antonio Gamoneda: la voz de la memoria y las voces de la colectividad", Ínsula (Madrid) 520 (1990) 9-10
- ÁLVAREZ MÉNDEZ, Natalia, "Fusión de la dimensión espacial y humana en León de la mirada", Estudios Humanísticos (Madrid) 22 (2000) 53-67
- ALVAREZ-UDE, Carlos, "Un canto a tres voces", Letra Internacional (Madrid) 42 (1996) 68
- AZANCOT, Leopoldo, "De una nueva épica", Historia Libertaria (Madrid) 2 (1979) 72-73
- BALCELLS, José María, "Libro de los venenos o la voz múltiple de Antonio Gamoneda", in De Jorge Guillén a Antonio Gamoneda, León, Secretariado de Publicaciones de la Universidad de León, 1998, 231-237
- BREYSSE-CHANET, Laurence, "Hacia la ‘aurora del contorno’. Una lectura de Cecilia de Antonio Gamoneda", Estudios Humanísticos (León) 30 (2008) 25-55
- CALVO VIDAL, José Luis, "Antonio Gamoneda poeta de la marginalidad", Evohé (Lugo) 1-2 (1997) 32-35
- CANDAU, Antonio, "Antonio Gamoneda: la conciencia y las formas de la ironía", Hispanic Review (Philadelphia), 62.1 (1994) 77–91.
- CANDAU, Antonio. "Para una lectura del Libro del frío", Letras peninsulares (Davidson) 9/2-3 (1996–1997) 319-338
- CARNET, Nelly, "Antonio Gamoneda: Clarté sans repos", Europe (Paris) 928-929 (2006) 353-354
- CASADO, Miguel, "Descripción de la mentira, de Antonio Gamoneda. La perplejidad es la conciencia", in Esto era y no era. Lectura de poetas de Castilla y León. Valladolid, Ámbito, 1985, I, 97–118.
- CASADO, Miguel, "El interior de la edad", Los Cuadernos del Norte (Oviedo) 40 (1986–1987) 58.
- CASADO, Miguel, "Sobre Lápidas", Los Cuadernos del Norte (Oviedo) 43 (1987).
- CASADO, Miguel, "Aún", Cambio 16 (Madrid) 1/2/1993.
- CASADO, Miguel, "Antonio Gamoneda", in De los ojos ajenos. Lecturas de Castilla, León y Portugal. Salamanca, Junta de Castilla y León, 1999, 51–63; 64–68; 80–88.
- CASADO, Miguel, "Abstracción y realidad en Antonio Gamoneda", La factoría valenciana (Valencia) 37 (1997) 3–15.
- CASADO, Miguel, "¿Placer sin esperanza?", Revista de Libros (Madrid) 47 (2000) 35–36.
- CASADO, Miguel, "Dispersión y poder de lo narrativo" in Del caminar sobre el hielo, Madrid, Antonio Machado Libros, 2001, 115–129.
- CASADO, Miguel, "Abstracción y realidad" in La poesía como pensamiento, Madrid, Huerga & Fierro, 2003, 107–133.
- CASADO, Miguel, "Cualidad de la huella", in Archivos (lecturas, 1988–2003), Burgos, Dossoles, 2004, 80–83.
- CASADO, Miguel, "Seis poetas de las periferias (Antonio Gamoneda, poeta de la realidad)", in Los artículos de la polémica y otros textos sobre poesía. Madrid, Biblioteca Nueva, 2005, 62–65.
- CASADO, Miguel, "El curso de la edad", Abada, Madrid, 2009.
- COLINAS, Antonio, "Lápidas, de Antonio Gamoneda: un humanismo para el fin de siglo", Ínsula (Madrid) 487 (1987) 16–17.
- DIEGO, José Manuel, "Antonio Gamoneda, el valor de la marginalidad", Ínsula (Madrid) 543 (1992) 11-12
- DIEGO, José Manuel, "Libro del frío: una mirada caleidoscópica", Diálogo de la Lengua (Cuenca) 2 (1993) 138-144
- DÍEZ, Luis Alfonso, "Antonio Gamoneda. Una poesía de la fugacidad (A propósito de El libro del frío)", Paideia (Madrid) 63 (2003) 117-125
- DOMÉNECH, Ricardo, "Poesía. Sublevación inmóvil de Antonio Gamoneda", Ínsula (Madrid) 173 (1961) 4
- DONCEL, Diego et alt., "Antonio Gamoneda". Madrid, Calambur, 1993
- ESCAPA, Ernesto, "Crónica de un estrago moral", Informaciones de las Artes y las Letras, 5 October 1978, 4
- ESPINASA, José María, "Cinco decenios adentrándose afuera", Letras libres, (Madrid) Año 6, 66 (junio 2004) 87-88
- EXPÓSITO HERNÁNDEZ, José Antonio, "La obra poética de Antonio Gamoneda". Tesis Doctoral. Universidad Complutense de Madrid (2003)
- FERNÁNDEZ-JÁUREGUI ROJAS, Carlota, "Apuntes para una poética del índice en César Vallejo y Antonio Gamoneda" in Despalabro. Ensayos de Humanidades (Madrid) (2007) 61-73
- GARCIA JURADO, Francisco, "Antiguos textos de ciencia convertidos en Poesía: Dioscórides y Andrés Laguna en el Libro de los venenos de Antonio Gamoneda", Epos (Madrid) XIII (1997) 379-395
- GASPAR, Sergio, "Antonio Gamoneda: leer el frío", Hora de poesía (Barcelona) 88-90 (1993) 356-357
- GÓMEZ TORÉ, José Luis: "Antonio Gamoneda: palabra corporal, poesía del cuerpo", Cuadernos del minotauro (Madrid) 2 (2005) 89-98
- GRACIA ARMENDÁRIZ, Juan, "Postnovísmos y generación del 50 José Angel Valente y Antonio Gamoneda", Actas del Congreso Jaime Gil de Biedma y su generación poética. Zaragoza, Diputación, 1996, II, 575-582
- HUERGA, Carlos, "Antonio Gamoneda: arden las pérdidas" http://www.deriva.org
- IGLESIAS SERNA, Amalia, "Antonio Gamoneda, el escultor de las palabras" in Letras libres (Madrid) 62 (2006) 40-43
- JANÉS, Clara, "Di vertigine e oblio" in Poesia (Milán) 216 (2007) 2-5
- LANZ, Juan José, "Antonio Gamoneda y la poética de la desocupación" in Ínsula (Madrid) 726 (2007) 2-5
- LÓPEZ CASTRO, Armando, "Antonio Gamoneda: la poesía de la memoria", in Voces y memoria. Poetas leoneses del siglo XX. Salamanca, Junta de Castilla y León, 151-189
- LLERA, José Antonio, "La memoria y la muerte en la poesía de Antonio Gamoneda: una lectura de Descripción de la mentira" in Laurel (Cáceres) 5 (2002) 25-61
- MARIGÓMEZ, Luis, "Antonio Gamoneda, Descripción de la mentira" in Un ángel más (Valladolid) 1 (1987) 153
- MARTÍNEZ, Santiago, "Antonio Gamoneda", Lateral (Madrid) 83 (2001) 8-9
- MARTÍNEZ FERNÁNDEZ, José Enrique, "Prometeo frente a Orfeo: poética de la renuncia frente a poética de la plenitud", Revista de teoría de la Literatura y Literatura Comparada (Zaragoza) 5 (1998) 60-66
- MARTINEZ GARCÍA, Francisco, Gamoneda, una poética temporalizada en el espacio leonés. León, Servicio de Publicaciones de la Universidad de León, 1991
- MERINO, Margarita, Ambigüedad y certidumbre en las "edades" poéticas de Antonio Gamoneda. [with an interview] Ph.D. thesis. Florida State University, 1999.
- MIRANDA, Jorge, "Música da morte", A Phala (Lisbon) 75 (1999) 177-179
- MIRÓ, Emilio, "Una colección y dos poetas: José Antonio Gabriel y Galán y Antonio Gamoneda", Ínsula, 377 (1978), 6-7
- MOGA, Eduardo, "Una antología luminosa", Lateral (Barcelona) 69 (2000) 24
- MOLINA, César Antonio, "Dos visiones épicas de lo contemporáneo", Camp de l'Arpa (Barcelona) 84-85 (1981) 65-67
- MONTAGUT, María Cinta, "Libro de los venenos", Quimera (Barcelona) 142 (1995) 73
- NAJT, Myriam, "Descripción de la mentira", Cuadernos Hispanoamericanos (Madrid) 339 (1978) 529-530
- ORTEGA, Antonio, "El uso y la sustancia del olvido", El crítico (Madrid) Segunda Época, junio 2003, s. p.
- ORTEGA, Esperanza, "La música de la oscuridad. Antonio Gamoneda", Campo de Agramante (Jerez de la Frontera) 5 (2005), 101-115
- PALOMO GARCÍA, Carmen, Antonio Gamoneda: Poéticas radicales, Tesis Doctoral, Universidad de León, 2006.
- PALLARÉS, María del Carmen, "Libro del frío. Contemplar la muerte", Reseña de Literatura, Arte y Espectáculos, (Madrid) 237 (1993), 34
- PEREZ LAS HERAS, Antonio, "De la juventud del dolor a la frialdad de la existencia: la poética unitaria de Antonio Gamoneda", in Actas del Congreso Jaime Gil de Biedma y su generación poética, Zaragoza, Diputación General de Aragón, 1996, II, 655–664.
- PICARDO, Osvaldo: "El abrazo de Orfeo" La pecera (Mar del Plata) 2 (2001) 61–67.
- REIJA MELCHOR, Francisco Javier, "Expansión do blues. Temas e tons na poesía de Antonio Gamoneda", Unión Libre (Lugo) 5 (2000) 125-132
- RODRÍGUEZ, Ildefonso, "La libertad blanca de Antonio Gamoneda", Delibros, 58, julio-agosto 1993, 49–50. Republished in El crítico (Madrid) Segunda Época, 5, s. p.
- RODRÍGUEZ, Ildefonso, "Azogue, sangre, leche alacrán: el libro de lo incierto", Espacio / Espaço escrito (Badajoz) 13-14 (1996) 209-215
- RODRÍGUEZ, Ildefonso, "La presión sobre los límites. Dos cuentos de Antonio Gamoneda", La Ortiga (Santander) 8-9 (1997) 233-235
- SÁNCHEZ SANTIAGO, Tomás, "Severidad sonámbula (lo que sigo pensando sobre Descripción de la mentira, de Antonio Gamoneda)", Solaria (Oviedo) Segunda Época, 15 (2004) 7-9
- SANZ VILLANUEVA, Santos (coord.), Historia y crítica de la literatura española. Barcelona, Crítica, 1999, 8/1, 267-270
- SERRANO, Pedro: "Gamoneda: la escasez y la necesidad", Letras libres (Madrid) 84 (2005) 84-87
- Several authors. Rencontres avec Antonio Gamoneda. Pau, Atelier Poésie Léo Lagrange, 2000
- SOLANO, Francisco, "La luz del silencio", El Urogallo (Madrid) 80-81 (1993) 71–73
- SOREL, Andrés: Iluminaciones. Antonio Gamoneda, Seville, RD Editores, 2008.
- SUÑEN, Juan Carlos, "Huellas sobre la nieve", El Crítico (Madrid) 16 (1992) 1-4
- SUÑEN, Juan Carlos, "El placer de la significación", El Urogallo (Madrid), 112-113 (1995), 66–67
- SUÑEN, Juan Carlos, "Modernidad practicable: filología y re-significación", Ínsula (Madrid) 593 (1996) 21
- VALVERDE, Álvaro, "La poesía de Antonio Gamoneda (una lectura), Cuadernos Hispanoamericanos (Madrid) 522 (1993) 134-142
- SUÑEN, Juan Carlos, "La geografía del final", Ínsula (Madrid) 553 (1993) 11-12
- VILAS, Manuel, "Arden banderas entre laureles. La Edad de Antonio Gamoneda", Cuadernos del Norte (Oviedo) 49 (1988) 55-57
- VILLENA, Luis Antonio, "Acercamiento a Gamoneda", El Urogallo (Madrid) 15,16,17 (1987) 121-122

== Monographs in magazines and journals ==
- "Un ángel más" (Valladolid) 2 (1987)
- "Filandón"/Diario de León (León) 10/7/1988
- "Noire et Blanche" (Le Havre) (1995)
- "Collection de l'Umbo" (Paris) 4 (1999)
- "Con Antonio Gamoneda", Zurgai (Bilbao) (2001)
- "La alegría de los naufragios" (Madrid) 7-8 (2003)
- "Antonio Gamoneda", in Espacio/Espaço Escrito (Badajoz) 23-24 (2004)
- "Antonio Gamoneda", en Quimera, Marta Agudo and Jordi Doce (eds.), (Madrid) 275 (2006)
- "Filandón"/Diario de León (León) 22/4/2007
- "República de las Letras" (Madrid) 104 (2007)
- "Minerva" (Madrid) 04 (2007)
- "Ínsula" (Madrid) 736 (2008)
