= Tea Tulić =

Croatian writer

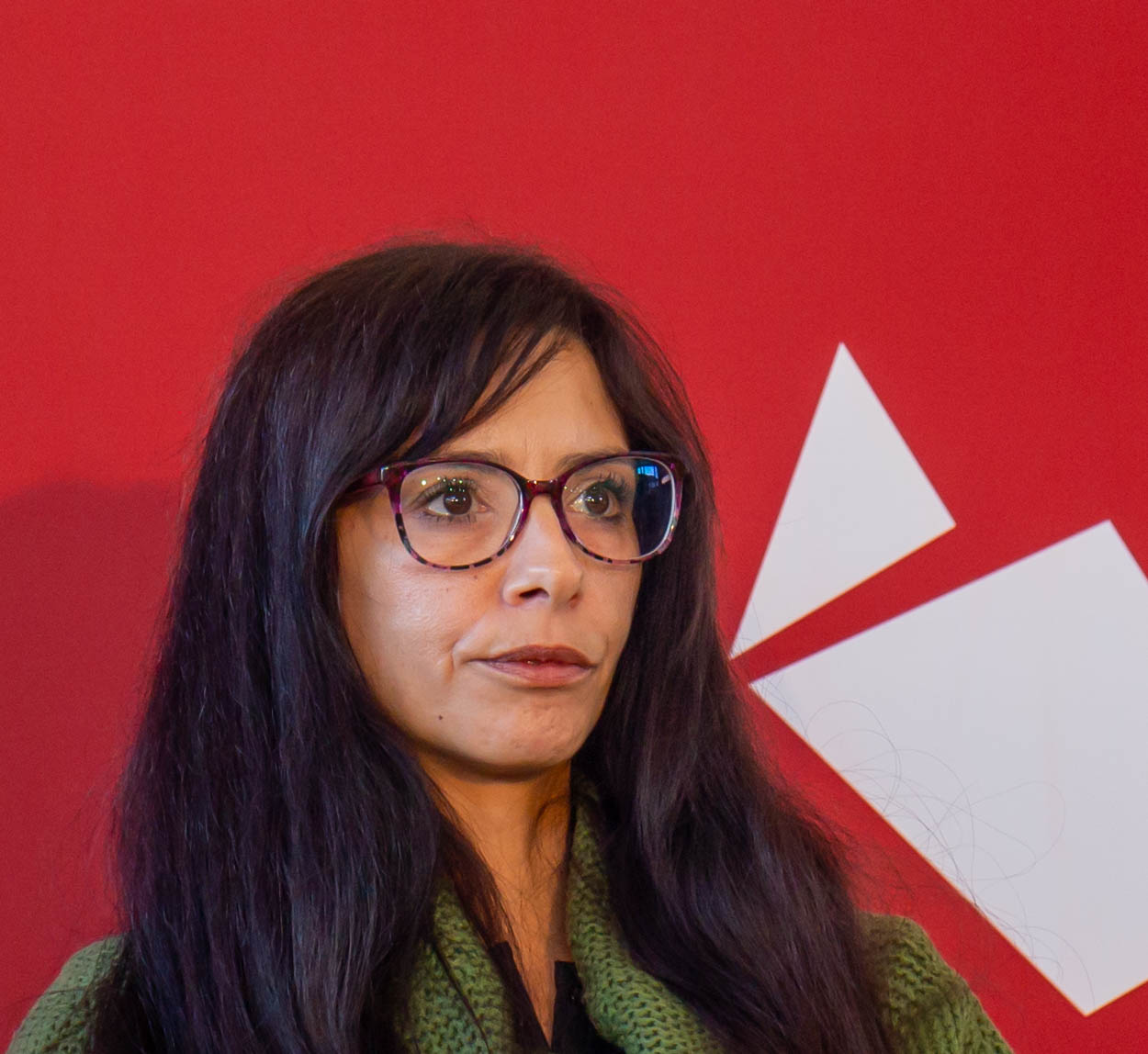
Tea Tulić at the 2024 Slovenian Book Fair

Tea Tulić (born 1978) is a Croatian writer. She was born in Rijeka. She is best known for her debut novel Kosa posvuda (Hair Everywhere) which received widespread acclaim. It has been translated into several European languages, including an English translation by Coral Petkovich.
