= Joey Goebel =

American author (born 1980)

- Born: September 2, 1980 (age 45); Henderson, Kentucky, U.S.
- Education: Brescia University; Spalding University (MFA)
- Occupation: High school teacher
- Writing career
- Genre: Fiction
- Notable work: see Bibliography
- Website: www.joeygoebel.com

Adam Joseph Goebel III (born September 2, 1980) is an American author, whose work centers around the peculiarities of culture in Middle America. He was raised in Henderson, Kentucky, a small town on the Ohio River across from Evansville, Indiana. His parents, Adam Goebel of Louisville, and Nancy Bingemer Goebel of Henderson, were both social workers and met in Frankfort, Kentucky. His older sister CeCe is also a social worker.

Goebel's books have been published in sixteen languages and have found their largest audience in Germany, Austria, and Switzerland.

Goebel currently lives in Kentucky. He is divorced and has a son, Adam Joseph Goebel IV ("Joe"). Goebel's third novel, Commonwealth, was published on July 4, 2008. His fourth and fifth novels were published in German.

== Education and careers ==
Goebel attended Brescia University in Owensboro, Kentucky, where he received an English degree with an emphasis in professional writing. He has received a Master of Fine Arts in Creative Writing from Spalding University in Louisville.

== Novels and nominations ==
MacAdam/Cage Publishing of San Francisco published Goebel's first book The Anomalies in April 2003. The Anomalies was a Book Sense 76 title selected by the nation's independent booksellers and was nominated for the Kentucky Literary Award. Goebel's second novel, Torture the Artist, was released in October 2004, also by MacAdam/Cage. Torture the Artist was the finalist for the 2004 Kentucky Literary Award and made the long list for the Dylan Thomas Prize for 2006.

In fall of 2005, Torture the Artist was published in German under the title Vincent by Diogenes Verlag, a Swiss literary publisher. Goebel attended the Frankfurt Book Fair, and he and Vincent were featured in Der Spiegel.

On July 4, 2008, Goebel's third novel, Commonwealth, was published. In 2009, he was the recipient of Romania's Ovid Festival Prize, awarded to a prominent young talent

In 2013, Goebel's fourth novel I Against Osborne was published in German under the title Ich gegen Osborne. It was also published in French.

In 2019, Diogenes published a collection of linked stories titled Irgendwann wird es gut. The English title is I Know It's Going to Happen for You Someday.

== Music career ==
=== The Mullets ===
From 1996 to 2001, prior to becoming a novelist, Goebel sang and played guitar for a punk band called The Mullets with band members Jason Sheeley and Justin Hope. The band played about one hundred shows throughout the Midwest (many in Evansville, Indiana) and released two cassette tapes, a seven-inch EP record, and three compact discs.

The band had a rabid following in the Tri-state area of Kentucky, Indiana, and Illinois. Goebel wrote over one hundred songs for the Mullets, some of them bitter love songs ("Swimmin' Alone with the Turkeys"), some scoffing at his surroundings—particularly small-town life ("Kentucky Waterfall"), some making fun of popular culture ("Intrusive T.V. Neighbors"), and some purely comedic ("At a Flea Market").

=== Novembrists ===
Goebel sang and played guitar for Novembrists, with bandmates Jr. Bailey and Luke Bickers. The band stayed together for about a year, long enough to record and release a CD. They played one farewell show. Novembrists songs were a bit darker and had a few more literary allusions, such as Vladimir Nabokov ("My Sweet Lolita") and F. Scott Fitzgerald ("All the Sad Young Men").

== Bibliography ==
Goebel's protagonists are intelligent rebels, sensible madmen, and rejected dreamers disgusted by a society that embraces boy band media and girl glam. His prose laments the absence of originality and morality in contemporary culture.

- The Anomalies (aka Freaks, German title) (2003)
- Torture the Artist (aka Vincent, German title) (2004)
- Commonwealth (aka Heartland, German title) (2008)
- I Against Osborne (aka Ich gegen Osborne, German title. Currently available in German only) (2013)
- One Day It Will Be Good (aka Irgendwann wird es gut, German title. Currently available in German only) (2019)

== Other work ==
Goebel has written several articles for the Evansville, Indiana arts and entertainment magazine News 4U.
