= Robert Perišić =

Croatian writer

Robert Perišić (born 1969 in Split, Croatia) is a Croatian writer. His books are considered as authentic portrayals of society in transformation and its antiheroes.

== Biography ==
Perišić graduated in Literature and Croatian language from the University of Zagreb. Since the beginning of the 1990s he has written poetry, short stories, plays, as well as literary reviews in various distinguished Croatian magazines such as Feral Tribune and Globus. His novel Our Man in Iraq (Naš čovjek na terenu) was the bestselling novel of 2008 in Croatia and has been published in numerous European countries and USA. From 1992 to 2000 Perišić was editor-in-chief of the cultural magazines Godine and Godine nove. Perišić currently lives and works in Zagreb.

== Writing ==
=== Our Man in Iraq ===
Our Man in Iraq is a social novel. The main characters of the novel are a young newspaper editor and his cousin, who reports from the Iraq War in 2003. The novel presents typical characters and situations of today's life in post-communist countries torn by political and social confusion, and it also gives compares experiences in the Balkan and Iraq Wars. The subjects of Our Man in Iraq include new types of society in Eastern Europe, globalisation, media life, rapid social changes, and their influences on human relationships.

Our Man in Iraq was a bestseller in Croatia and received the Jutarnji list newspaper prize for the best prose in 2007. The book was also published in English by Istros Books in London in 2012. Perišić's novel has also been awarded the Literaturpreis der Steiermärkischen Sparkasse 2011 in Graz, Austria. It was published in the United States in April 2013 as Our Man in Iraq. It had excellent reviews in the US, and was praised by the likes of The New Yorker, NPR's "All Things Considered," and The Guardian, as well as by writers such as Jonathan Franzen.

=== No-Signal Area ===
No-Signal Area, Perišić's second novel, follows two entrepreneurs as they renovate a turbine factory in a remote Croatian town. Upon its release, the novel received excellent critical responses in Croatia and neighbouring countries and was shortlisted for several literary awards. The US edition, translated by Ellen Elias-Bursać, was published in April 2020 by Seven Stories Press.

=== A Cat at the End of the World ===
A Cat at the End of the World (2022) follows an enslaved ancient Greek boy's escape to Dalmatia with his cat Miu, driven by a personified wind. It was published in the US by Sandorf Passage.

=== Short stories ===
Perišić's short counterculture stories have given him a reputation and audience in Croatia and ex-Yugoslavia countries, especially among younger readers. His first collection of twenty short stories You Can Spit On The One Who'll Ask For Us (Možeš pljunuti onoga tko bude pitao za nas), published 1999, was considered as rebellious at the post-war time and it get lot of publicity as a voice of a desperate young generation.

Horror and Huge Expenses (Užas i veliki troškovi), collection of twenty stories published in 2002, was acclaimed by critics and considereds as one of the most important Croatian books of the decade. In this book Perišić gives an authentic, somewhat tragicomic picture of the post-war society meeting consumer society. His short story "No God in Susedgrad" ("Nema boga u Susedgradu") gave the name to an anthology of contemporary Croatian writers published in German in 2008 by Schöffling & Co (Kein Gott in Susedgrad). Two of his short stories are included in the anthology of East-European short stories Pensi che ci saremmo potuti conoscere in un bar? (Carivan edizione, Roma, 2010).

=== Poetry ===
Perišić's book Castle America (Dvorac Amerika) is a collection of poetry published in 1995. The title Caste America refers to two of Franz Kafka's novels and the book is a kind of poetic view of a global Kafkian Castle. His second poetry book, Sometime Later (Jednom kasnije), was published in 2012.

=== Movies and Theatre ===
His black comedy Culture in Suburb (Kultura u predgrađu) was performed in the City Drama Theatre "Gavella" in Zagreb as part of the programme for the seasons 2000-2002. Perišić wrote the screenplay for the movie 100 Minutes of Glory (100 minuta Slave, 2004), directed by Dalibor Matanić. It is a dark, romantic drama based on the life of a deaf female painter, Slava Raškaj.
