= Faruk Šehić =

Bosnian poet, novelist and short story writer (1970)

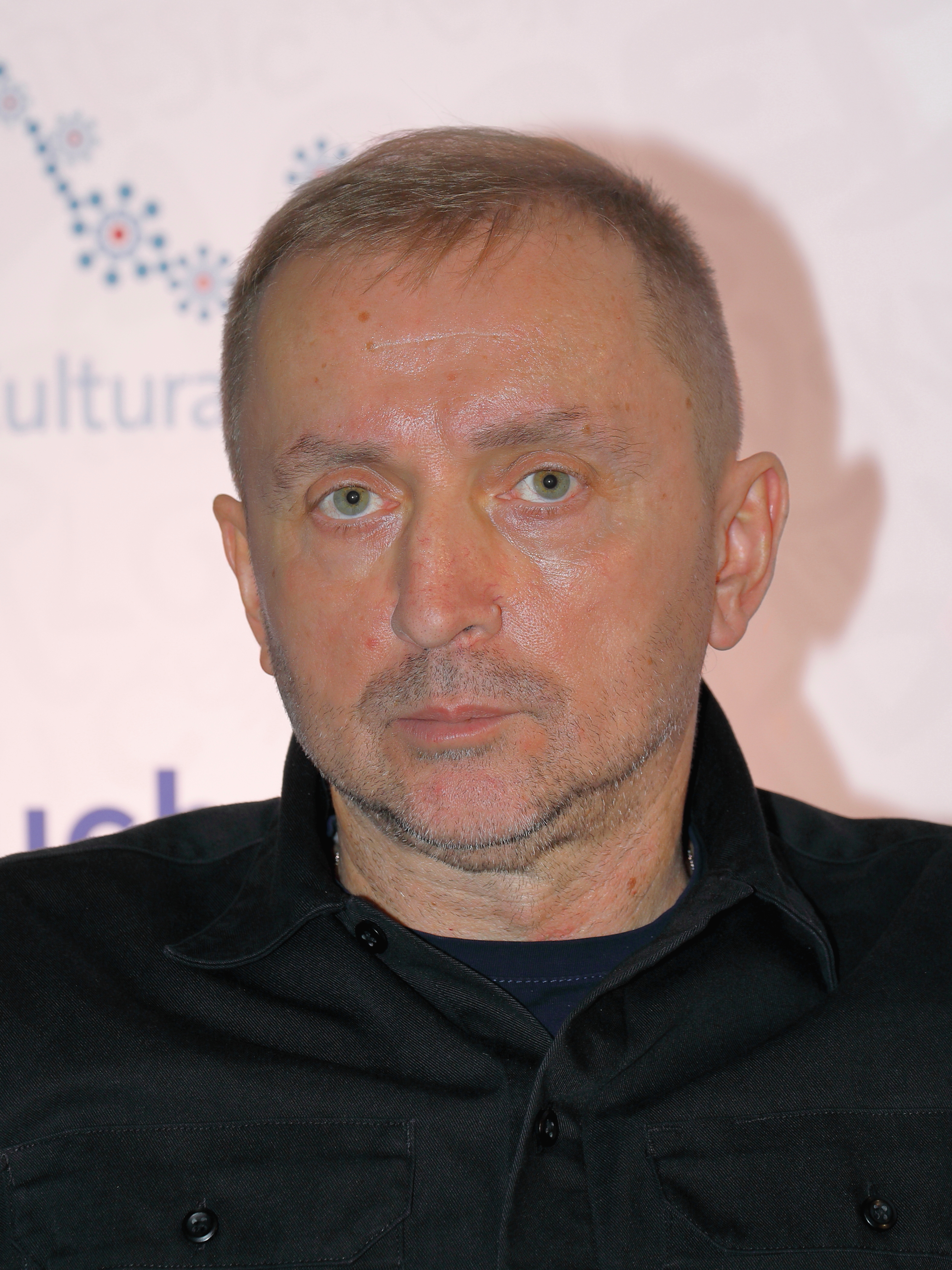
Faruk Šehić

Faruk Šehić (Serbo-Croatian Cyrillic: Фарук Шехић; born April 14, 1970) is a Bosnian poet, novelist and short story writer.

He was born in Bihać and grew up in Bosanska Krupa. He studied veterinary medicine in Zagreb until the outbreak of the Bosnian war in which he was an active combatant. After the war, he turned to literature. His first book was a collection of poems Pjesme u nastajanju (Acquired Poems, 2000). His short story collection Pod pritiskom (Under Pressure) was published in 2004 and won the Zoro Verlag Prize. The English translation of Under Pressure was published in May 2019 by Istros Books. His debut novel Knjiga o Uni (Quiet Flows the Una, 2011), was translated into English in 2016 by Istros Books and into Italian in 2017 by E. Mujčić (Il mio fiume) for Mimesis, and also into Romanian, Bulgarian, Turkish, Spanish, Macedonian, Arabic, Dutch, Polish, Slovenian and Hungarian languages. Quiet Flows the Una won the Meša Selimović prize for the best novel published in the former Yugoslavia in 2011, and the EU Prize for Literature in 2013. His most recent poetry book is a collection of poetry entitled My Rivers (Moje rijeke, Buybook, 2014), for which he received the Risto Ratković Award for the best poetry book in Serbia, Bosnia and Herzegovina, Montenegro and Croatia in 2014, and Annual award from the Association of Writers of Bosnia and Herzegovina. He also received XXXI Premio Letterario Camaiore Francesco Belluomini (Premio Internazionale 2019) for selected poems "Ritorno alla natura" as a youngest laureate so far. In 2018, he published a collection of short stories, Clockwork Stories.

Šehić lives in Sarajevo, where he works as a columnist and journalist. He is a member of the Writers’ Association and the PEN Centre of Bosnia and Herzegovina. His books have been translated into 15 languages and published in 19 countries. In 2017, Šehić has signed the Declaration on the Common Language of the Croats, Serbs, Bosniaks and Montenegrins.

== Published works ==
- Pjesme u Nastajanju (Acquired Poems), 2000
- Hit depo (Hit Depot), 2003
- Pod Pritiskom (Under Pressure), 2004
- Transsarajevo 2006
- Hit depo, Pod pritiskom, Transsarajevo, Apokalipsa iz Recycle bina/Dodatne scene (Hit Depot, Under Pressure, Transsarajevo, Apocalypse from Recycle Bin/Additional Scenes), 2007/2018
- Knjiga o Uni (Quiet Flows the Una), 2011
- Moje rijeke (My Rivers), 2014
- Priče sa satnim mehanizmom (Clockwork Stories), 2018
- Greta (Greta), 2021.

== Works translated into English ==
- Quiet Flows the Una (Istros Books, London, 2016)
- Under Pressure (Istros Books, London, 2019)
