= Neon (magazine) =

British film magazine

- Editor: Adam Higginbotham
- Categories: Film
- Frequency: Monthly
- First issue: December 1996
- Final issue: February 1999
- Company: EMAP
- Country: United Kingdom
- Language: English

Neon was a British film magazine published monthly by EMAP from December 1996 to February 1999. It attempted to be a refreshing alternative to other UK film magazines such as Sight & Sound and was seen as the movie version of Select magazine as Empire was originally to Q.

== History and profile ==
Started in 1996, Neon included latest film news, previews, actor profiles, interviews and contemporary movie profiles all written with a characteristic sense of humor. Each issue featured A Monthly Selection of Ten Favourite Things with a celebrity listing a particular category for their ten favorite films, for example, James Ellroy in the July 1998 issue picked his ten favorite crime movies.

What's your favourite Chevy Chase movie? featured the magazine asking various celebrities from the Beastie Boys to Pamela Anderson and Tommy Lee their favorite Chase film.

100 Scenes From... was an irreverent Top 100 list that parodied the notion of such lists.

Blow Up was a 12-page insert included in the middle of every issue that featured stills, promotional pictures of posters of movies and movie stars.

Another regular staple was called, Flashback, a detailed, oral history of a classic movie with comments culled from cuttings and original interviews with cast and crew members. This format was later copied by another UK film periodical, Hotdog Magazine.

Finally, Graham Linehan's Filmgoer's Companion took a satirical look at the entertainment industry.

Neon also championed lesser known films like Mike Leigh's Naked and ran in-depth profiles of films such as Steven Soderbergh's Out of Sight and Fear and Loathing in Las Vegas.

The magazine did not make a profit and after the original editor left, it took a more commercial direction. The circulation numbers diminished and Neon was eventually cancelled in February 1999.
