= European Prize for Literature =

Literary award sponsored by the city of Strasbourg

European Prize for Literature (Prix Européen de Littérature) is a European-wide literary award sponsored by the city of Strasbourg with support from the Ministry of Foreign and European Affairs (France). The prize is awarded by the Jurys des Grands Prix Littéraires, in Strasbourg, at the same time as the Prix de Littérature Francophone Jean Arp and the Prix du Patrimoine Nathan Katz.

The award is presented to an author for their entire body of work, which best represents the cultural dimensions of Europe.

== Honorees ==
Year	Author	Nationality	Ref
2006	Antonio Gamoneda	Spain	
2006	Bo Carpelan	Finland	
2007	Tadeusz Różewicz	Poland	
2008	Tankred Dorst	Germany	
2009	Kiki Dimoula	Greece	
2010	Tony Harrison	United Kingdom	
2011	Drago Jančar	Slovenia	
2012	Vladimir Makanin	Russia	
2013	Erri De Luca	Italy	
2014	Jon Fosse	Norway	
2016	Jaan Kaplinski	Estonia	
