= Tomaž Šalamun =

Slovenian poet (1941–2014)

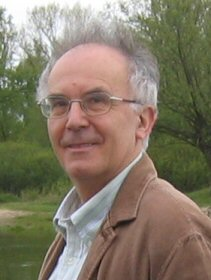
- Šalamun in 2005
- Born: July 4, 1941; Zagreb, Independent State of Croatia
- Died: December 27, 2014 (aged 73); Ljubljana, Slovenia
- Education: University of Ljubljana
- Occupation: Poet
- Spouse: Metka Krašovec
- Writing career
- Language: Slovene
- Notable awards: Pushcart Prize, Prešeren Fund Award, European Prize for Poetry
- Movement: Neo-avant-garde

Tomaž Šalamun (July 4, 1941 – December 27, 2014) was a Slovenian poet who was a leading figure of postwar neo-avant-garde poetry in Central Europe and an internationally acclaimed absurdist. His more than 50 books of Slovene poetry have been translated into more than twenty-five languages. His work has been called a poetic bridge between old European roots and America. Šalamun was a member of the Slovenian Academy of Sciences and Arts. He lived in Ljubljana, Slovenia, and was married to the painter Metka Krašovec.

== Life ==
As members of the Slovene minority in Italy (1920–1947), Šalamun's mother's family joined thousands of Slovenes who left their homes because of forced Italianization and moved from Italy to Yugoslavia, where he was born in 1941 in Zagreb. His father's family came from Ptuj, where his grandfather had been a mayor. After his family moved to Koper, the local high school teachers of French and Slovene aroused his interest in language. In 1960, he began to study art history and history at University of Ljubljana where he graduated in 1965. His mother was an art historian, his brother Andraž is an artist, and his two sisters Jelka and Katarina are a biologist and a literary historian respectively. Šalamun died on 27 December 2014 in Ljubljana.

== Work ==
In 1964, as editor of the literary magazine Perspektive, he published his iconoclastic poem "Duma '64" (Thought '64). When Ivan Maček, a Titoist hard-liner, saw the dead cat in the poem as a reference to himself (the Slovene word maček means 'cat'), Perspektive was banned and Šalamun was arrested. He spent five days in jail and came out something of a culture hero, but he refrained from including the poem in his first poetry book, which appeared in 1966 in a samizdat edition, full of absurdist irreverence, playfulness, and wild abandon.

Matthew Zapruder wrote the following about him and his work in The New York Times:

There was no purer contemporary surrealist than the Slovenian poet Tomaz Salamun, whose poems are not designed to be interpreted but instead to act upon us, in order to open up in us a little dormant space of weirdness where we can hopefully feel more free.

== Poetry collections translated into English ==
Several collections of Šalamun's poetry have been published in English, including The Selected Poems of Tomaž Šalamun (Ecco Press, 1988), The Shepherd, the Hunter (Pedernal, 1992), The Four Questions of Melancholy (White Pine, 1997), Feast (Harcourt, 2000), Poker (Ugly Duckling Presse), Row! (Arc Publications, 2006), The Book for My Brother (Harcourt), Woods and Chalices (Harcourt, 2008, translated by Brian Henry), There's the Hand and There's the Arid Chair (Counterpath, 2009), On the Tracks of Wild Game (Ugly Duckling Presse, 2012), Soy Realidad (Dalkey Archive Press, 2014), Justice (Black Ocean, 2015), Andes (Black Ocean, 2016), Druids (Black Ocean, 2019), Opera Buffa (Black Ocean, 2022), and Kiss the Eyes of Peace: Selected Poems 1964-2014 (Milkweed, 2024). American poets that influenced him include Frank O'Hara, John Ashbery, and Walt Whitman.

== International reception ==
=== United States ===
In July 1970, he was personally invited to exhibit his work at the Museum of Modern Art in New York City. Šalamun spent two years at the University of Iowa, including one year in the International Writing Program from 1971 to 1972, and lived for periods of time in the United States after that. From 2005 to 2007 he taught at the University of Pittsburgh.

=== Slovenia ===
For a time, he served as Cultural Attaché to the Consulate General of Slovenia in New York. Literary critic Miklavž Komelj wrote: "Šalamun’s inventiveness with language has, indeed, never been more dynamic than in his most recent books. But in this dynamism there is also a monotone quality, which the poet makes no attempt to hide. It is as if this ecstasy resulted from spinning endlessly in a circle, like the whirling dervishes—a religious order, incidentally, that was founded by the mystic Rumi, one of Šalamun’s favorite poets....It seems that the intensity of Šalamun’s language lies precisely in the endless insistence of its pulsation."

== Prizes ==
Šalamun won a Pushcart Prize, as well as Slovenia's Prešeren Fund Award and Jenko Prize. Šalamun and his German translator, Fabjan Hafner, were awarded the European Prize for Poetry by the German city of Muenster. In 2004, he was the recipient of Romania's Ovid Festival Prize.
