= Coral Petkovich =

Australian writer and translator

- Born: Perth, Western Australia
- Education: University of Western Australia
- Occupations: Writer; translator
- Notable work: Seven Terrors (English translation)
- Awards: Science Fiction & Fantasy Translation Awards (2013 shortlist)

Coral Petkovich is an Australian writer of biographies and a translator of both Bosnian and Croatian to English.

Her 2012 translation of Selvedin Avdić's 2010 book Seven Terrors was shortlisted for the Science Fiction & Fantasy Translation Awards in 2013.

== Early life and education ==
Petkovich was born in Perth to mother May Watson.

She studied at the University of Western Australia.

== Career ==
Petkovich has written two biographies, her first being Ivan, From the Adriatic to Pacific published in 2009 by Glass House books is a memoir of Croatian man Ivan Antulich who grew up during World War I. Her second book, May's Story, published in 2016, is a biography of her mother's life.

She has also translated two novels from Bosnian and Croatian into English: Seven Terrors by Selvedin Avdić and Hair Everywhere by Tea Tulić.

Her translation of Seven Terrors was shortlisted for the Science Fiction & Fantasy Translation Awards in 2013 and longlisted for the International Dublin Literary Award in 2013.

== Personal life ==
Petkovich lives in Perth, Western Australia.
