= Ognjen Spahić =

Montenegrin writer

- Born: 1977 (age 47–48) Titograd, Socialist Federal Republic of Yugoslavia

Ognjen Spahić (born 1977 in Podgorica, Montenegro), is a Montenegrin novelist. Spahić has published two collections of short stories: Sve to (All That, 2001) and Zimska potraga (Winter Search, 2007). His novel Hansenova djeca (Hansen's Children, 2004) won him the 2005 Meša Selimović Prize for the best new novel from Croatia, Serbia, Montenegro and Bosnia-Herzegovina. To date, Hansenova djeca has been published in French, Italian, Slovenian, Romanian, Hungarian, Macedonian, Arabic and English (by the UK publisher Istros Books).

His short story “Raymond is No Longer with Us—Carver is Dead” was included in the anthology Best European Fiction 2011 published by Dalkey Archive Press in the USA. In 2007, he was a writing resident at the University of Iowa's International Writing Program.

In 2011, he was the recipient of Romania's Ovid Festival Prize, awarded to a prominent young talent.

== Awards and honours ==
- 2014 European Union Prize for Literature, Montenegro, Puna glava radosti

== Bibliography ==
- "Hansen’s Children" London: Istros Books, 2011.
- Zimska potraga [‘Winter Search’]. Zagreb: Durieux, 2007.
- Hansenova djeca [Hansen's Children’]. Zagreb: Durieux, 2004.
- Sve to [‘All That’]. Ulcinj: Plima, 2001.
