= Ewald Osers =

Czech translator and poet (1917–2011)

Ewald Osers (13 May 1917 – 11 October 2011) was a Czech translator and poet born in Prague, Austria-Hungary.

== Career ==
He translated several important Czech poetry works of the 20th century into English, including Jaroslav Seifert, Vítězslav Nezval, Miroslav Holub and Jan Skácel. He also translated several German-language authors such as Thomas Bernhard, as well as Macedonian-language books (Mateja Matevski), poetry of the Silesian poet Óndra Łysohorsky, and two major Slovak poets, Miroslav Válek and Milan Rúfus.

== Selected bibliography ==
Works

- Arrive Where We Started (poems), 1995
- Snows of Yesteryear (memoir), 2007

Translations

- Modern Czech Poetry: An Anthology, 1945 (with J.K. Montgomery)
- Richard Strauss, A Working Friendship: The Correspondence between Richard Strauss and Hugo von Hofmannsthal, 1961 (with H. Hammelmann)
- Paul Carell, Scorched Earth: Hitler's War on Russia, Vol. 2, 1970
- Three Czech Poets: Vítězslav Nezval, Antonín Bartušek, Josef Hanzlík, 1971 (with G. Theiner)
- Óndra Łysohorsky, Selected Poems, 1971
- Reiner Kunze, With the Volume Turned Down, and Other Poems, 1973
- Contemporary German Poetry, 1976
- Rose Ausländer, Selected Poems, 1977
- Rudolf Langer, Wounded No Doubt: Selected Poems, 1979
- Nahapet Kuchak, A Hundred and One Hayrens, 1979
- Jaroslav Seifert, The Plague Column, 1979
- Walter Helmut Fritz, Without Remission: Selected Poems, 1981
- Sebastian Haffner, The Meaning of Hitler, 1983
- Jaroslav Seifert, An Umbrella from Piccadilly, 1983
- Miroslav Holub, On the Contrary, and Other Poems, 1984
- Nikola Vaptsarov, Nineteen Poems, 1984
- Voices from across the Water: Translations from Twelve Languages, 1985
- Karel Čapek, War with the Newts, 1985, new trans., 1990
- Lyubomir Levchev, Stolen Fire: Selected Poems, 1986
- The Selected Poetry of Jaroslav Seifert, 1986 (with G. Gibian)
- Miroslav Holub, The Fly, 1987 (with J. Milner and G. Theiner)
- Jaroslav Cejka, Michael Cernik, and Karel Sys, New Czech Poetry, 1988
- Vladimír Janovic, The House of the Tragic Poet, 1988
- Mateja Matevski, Footprints of the Wind: Selected Poems, 1988
- Thomas Bernhard, Wittgenstein's Nephew, 1986
- Thomas Bernhard, Cutting Timber, 1988
- Thomas Bernhard, Old Masters, 1989
- Thomas Bernhard, The Cheap-Eaters, 1990
- Miroslav Holub, Poems Before and After: Collected English Translations, 1990 (with I. Milner, J. Milner, and Theiner)
- Rüdiger Safranski, Schopenhauer and the Wild Years of Philosophy, 1990
- Thomas Bernhard, Yes, 1991
- Ivan Klíma, Love and Garbage, 1991
- Josef Hanzlík, Selected Poems, 1992 (with I. Milner and J. Milner)
- Michael Krüger, The End of the Novel, 1992
- Konrad Spindler, The Man in the Ice, 1994
- Heinz Piontek, Selected Poems, 1994
- Miroslav Válek, The Ground Beneath Our Feet: Selected Poems, 1996
- Albrecht Fölsing, Albert Einstein: A Biography, 1997
- Rüdiger Safranski, Martin Heidegger: Between Good and Evil, 1997
- Jan Skácel, Banned Man: Selected Poems, 2001
- Vítězslav Nezval Edison: Poem with Five Cantos, 2003
- Milan Rúfus, And That's the Truth! Poems in English & Slovak, 2005
- Vítězslav Nezval Prague With Fingers of Rain, 2009

== Awards ==
- 1971: Schlegel-Tieck Prize, for Scorched Earth by Paul Carell
- 1987: European Poetry Translation Prize, for The Selected Poetry of Jaroslav Seifert
