= Schopenhauer (disambiguation) =

Arthur Schopenhauer was a German philosopher best known for his work The World as Will and Representation.

Schopenhauer may also refer to:

- 7015 Schopenhauer, a main-belt asteroid

== People with the surname ==
- Johanna Schopenhauer (1766–1838), German author, Arthur Schopenhauer's mother
- Adele Schopenhauer (1797–1849), German author, Arthur Schopenhauer's sister
- Vincent Cervoni Schopenhauer or Happy (born 1991), French Counter-Strike player
