= Shelley Frisch =

American literary translator

Shelley Laura Frisch (born January 1952) is an American literary translator from German to English. She is best known for her translations of biographies, most notably of Franz Kafka, Friedrich Nietzsche, Albert Einstein, Leonardo da Vinci, and Marlene Dietrich/Leni Riefenstahl (dual biography).

== Biography ==
Born in New York City, Frisch now lives in Princeton, New Jersey. She received a Ph.D. in Germanic languages and literature from Princeton University in 1981 after completing a doctoral dissertation titled "Speculations of the origin of language and German Romanticism." She taught at Bucknell University and Columbia University (where she was Executive Editor of Germanic Review), then served as Chair of the Bi-College German Department at Haverford and Bryn Mawr Colleges until turning to translation full-time in the mid-1990s. In addition to her translation work, she co-directs international translation workshops with Karen Nölle, and serves on several juries to award translation prizes, e.g., the Kurt and Helen Wolff Translation Prize.

== Awards and honors ==
- Longlisted for Warwick Prize for Women in Translation (2018), for Maybe Esther, by Katja Petrowskaja.
- Winner, Helen and Kurt Wolff Translation Prize (2014)
- Winner, Aldo and Jeanne Scalgione Prize, 2005-2006 - for Kafka: The Decisive Years.
- Longlisted for the PEN Translation Prize, the National Book Critics Circles Awards, and the National Translation Award.

== Publications ==
Frisch has written and lectured widely on themes pertaining to literature, cinema, and exile. Her book, The Lure of the Linguistic, was published by Holmes & Meier in 2004.

Selected Book Translations

- Thomas Meyer, Hannah Arendt: A Life of the Mind. (Penguin Press, 2026).
- Jan Mohnhaupt, The Zookeepers' War: The Incredible True Story of an Animal Arms Race (Simon & Schuster, 2019).
- Helmuth James von Moltke and Freya von Moltke, Last Letters: The Prison Correspondence Between Helmuth and Freya von Moltke 1944-45. Edited by Helmuth Caspar von Moltke, Johannes von Moltke, and Dorothea von Moltke (New York Review Books, 2019).
- Katja Petrowskaja, Maybe Esther (HarperCollins, 2018).
- Reiner Stach, Kafka: The Early Years (Princeton University Press, 2016).
- Karin Wieland, Dietrich & Riefenstahl (Liveright/W. W. Norton, 2015).
- Reiner Stach, Kafka: The Years of Insight (Princeton University Press, 2013).
- Richard David Precht, Who Am I—And If So, How Many? (Spiegel & Grau/Random House, 2011).
- Stefan Klein, Leonardo's Legacy (Da Capo Press, 2010).
- Götz Aly and Michael Sontheimer, Fromms: How Julius Fromm's Condom Empire Fell to the Nazis (Other Press, 2009).
- Hannelore Brenner-Wonschick, The Girls of Room 28 (Schocken Books, 2009) - co-trans. with John E. Woods.
- Hape Kerkeling, I'm Off Then: Losing and Finding Myself on the Camino de Santiago (Free Press/Simon & Schuster, 2009).
- Suraiya Faroqhi, The Ottoman Empire: A Short History (Markus Wiener Publishers, 2008).
- Stefan Klein, The Secret Pulse of Time (Marlowe & Company, 2007).
- Jürgen Neffe, Einstein: A Biography (Farrar, Straus & Giroux, 2007).
- Reiner Stach., Kafka: The Decisive Years (Harcourt, 2005).
- Michael Brenner, Zionism (Markus Wiener Publishers, 2003).
- Rüdiger Safranski, Nietzsche: A Philosophical Biography (W. W. Norton, 2002).
- Piotr Scholz, Eunuchs and Castrati (Markus Wiener Publishers, 2000) co-trans. with John Broadwin.
- Werner Zips, Black Rebels (Ian Randle Publishers, 1998).
- Jürgen Osterhammel, Colonialism: A Theoretical Overview (Ian Randle Publishers, 1997).
