= Fiesco (play) =

Tragedy by Friedrich Schiller (1783)

Fiesco (full title – Die Verschwörung des Fiesco zu Genua, or Fiesco's Conspiracy at Genoa) is the second full-length drama written by the German playwright Friedrich Schiller. It is a republican tragedy based on the historical conspiracy of Giovanni Luigi Fieschi against Andrea Doria in Genoa in 1547. Schiller began it after the 1782 premiere of his first play, The Robbers, and dedicated it to his teacher Jakob Friedrich von Abel. It has 75 scenes, which is more than Goethe's highly popular Götz von Berlichingen. It premiered in Bonn in 1783 at the Hoftheater.

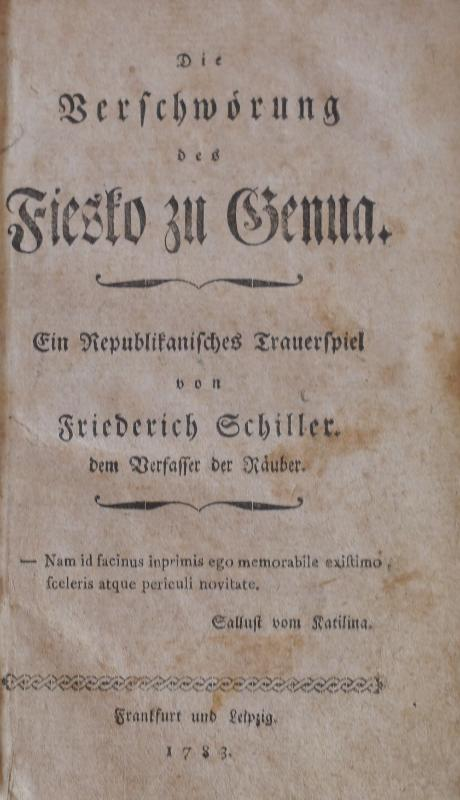
Fiesco

The play was the basis for the 1921 German silent film The Conspiracy in Genoa directed by Paul Leni.

== Introduction ==
When Schiller fled from Stuttgart to Mannheim on 22 September 1782, he took with him the almost completed manuscript of a play which he asserted he was striving to bring to a state of perfection never before seen on the German stage. A piece that would be free of all the weaknesses which still clung to his first piece. With Fiesco's Conspiracy, which he intended to share with no less than Lessing, Wieland and Goethe before publication, something he in the end refrained from doing, he was convinced that he would finally establish his reputation as a playwright.

On 27 September the author recited his play to the players of the Mannheim Theater at the home of Wilhelm Christian Meyer, its director. Andreas Streicher, who had fled with Schiller, gave an account of the afternoon: The reaction of the listeners was devastating. By the end of the second of five acts, the company had dispersed except for Meyer and Iffland. As they were leaving, the director asked Streicher if he was really convinced that Schiller had written The Robbers. "Because Fiesco is the worst piece I have ever heard in my life, and because it is impossible that the same Schiller who wrote The Robbers would have produced anything so coarse and dreadful". Streicher left the manuscript with him, and after reading it that night, Meyer completely reversed his previous opinion. What he had found so disagreeable about the piece was due to the author's strong Swabian accent and the "terrible way he declaimed everything", a style of presentation Schiller himself esteemed highly. "He recites everything in the same pompous way, whether he is reading, 'he closed the door' or one of his hero's main speeches". But the drama itself had Meyer convinced. "Fiesco", he said, "is a masterpiece and far superior to The Robbers!"

== The plot ==
=== The characters ===
- Andreas Doria, Doge of Genoa. A venerable old man 80 years old. A trace of fire. Main attributes: Gravity, a stern and imperious brevity.
- Gianettino Doria, His nephew. Claimant. A man 26 years old. Crude and offensive language, gait and manners. Boorishly proud. At odds with himself. (Both Dorias wear scarlet).
- Fiesco, Count of Lavagna. Head of the conspiracy. Young, slender, radiantly handsome man 23 years old, well-mannered pride, majestic friendliness, politely adroit as well as wily. (All the nobility wear black. The costumes are all old-style German.)
- Verrina, Dedicated republican. A man 60 years old. Massive, serious and gloomy.
- Bourgognino, Conspirator. A youth of 20 years. Noble and pleasant. Proud, spontaneous and unpretentious.
- Calcagno, Conspirator. Gaunt sensualist. 30 years old. Pleasing and enterprising.
- Sacco, Conspirator. A man 45 years old. An ordinary person.
- Lomellino, Gianettino's Confidant.
- Leonore, Fiesco's spouse. A woman 18 years old. Pale and frail. Delicate and sensitive. Attractive, but not showy. Gives an impressive of effusive melancholy. Black clothing.
- Julia, Countess and imperial dowager. Doria's sister. A woman 25 years old. Tall and stout. Proud flirt. Beauty spoiled by bizarreness. Splendid but not pleasing. An unpleasant mocking character. Black clothing.
- Bertha, Verrina's daughter. An innocent young girl.
- Romano, Painter. Informal, direct and proud.
- Muley Hassan, Moor from Tunis. Suspicious looking character. Physiognomy a peculiar mixture of roguery and whimsy.
- Rosa, Arabella, Leonore's chambermaids.
- A German in the ducal bodyguard. Honorable simplicity. Hearty bravery.
- Centurions, Zibo, Asserato, several of the nobility, locals, Germans, soldiers, servants, thieves, three rebellious inhabitants and other malcontents.

=== Background ===
Genoa in 1547. This commercial center had gained its independence from France as well as a new prince through the actions of Andrea Doria 19 years previously. But the Doge Doria is now an old man 80 years old and there are fears that his nephew, Gianettino Doria, will be his successor. Among the Genoese nobility there is resistance to the rule of the Dorias and especially to his tyrannical nephew. A few of the dissatisfied rally around the strong-willed republican Verrina, but most have their own selfish goals. Sacco joins the conspiracy because he thinks he will be able to rid himself of his debts if there is a rebellion. Calcagno wants Fiesco's wife Leonore. Bourgognino wants to finally marry his bride Bertha, Verrina's daughter. Her seduction and rape by Gianettino Doria provide the immediate motive for the conspiracy.

The behavior of Fiesco, the young Count of Lavagna, leaves the conspirators unsure about whether he is one of them or not. He woos the disreputable sister of the schemer Gianettino and behaves in general as an unprincipled playboy without any political ambition. Even Leonore, Fiesco's wife, does not know where she is with her husband. Verrina alone distrusts the Count's actions. He suspects that behind his mask of a hedonist lurks a conspirator, and accordingly fears him. He decides to get rid of him as soon as the conspiracy is over and Genoa free. Gianettino Doria also sees a danger in Fiesco and wants the Moor Muley Hassan to eliminate him. But the moor reveals the attempted murder and Fiesco gains in him someone who will help him initiate his counterscheme. He then informs the other noblemen about his own secret plans for a coup, without giving them all the details. He is recognized at once as head of the conspiracy. Only Verrina remains suspicious. He fears that Fiesco does not want a republic but rather the rank of a duke for himself. In a secret scene in the forest, he shares his thoughts with his future son-in-law Bourgognino; he is quite sure: "When Genoa is free, Fiesco dies".

So Schiller spins in his tragedy a threefold conspiracy: Gianettino is preparing a putsch to dethrone Andreas Doria and destroy all the remaining republicans. The conspirators and Fiesco pursue the downfall of the Dorias, and in order to preserve the republic Verinna plans to murder Fiesco if the conspiracy is successful.

Verrina's concern is not totally unfounded, because Fiesco himself is not sure about either his own or Genoa's future. "What a turmoil in my breast! What a malicious flight of thoughts…. Fiesco the republican? Duke Fiesco?...." After a thoughtful pause he firmly states, "To win a crown is great, but to throw it away is heavenly." Then decisively, "Perish, tyrant. Be free, Genoa, and I…" softly, "your happiest citizen!" One scene later Fiesco is more uncertain than ever. "I the greatest man in all Genoa? And small minds shouldn’t gather around great minds?"

=== The revolt ===
Fiesco has made up his mind, and the conspiracy takes its course. Under the pretext of equipping a number of galleys for an expedition against the Turks, Fiesco gathers support in the form of several hundred mercenaries and smuggles them into the city. Under his leadership the conspirators take over the city's St. Thomas gate, occupy the harbor and gain control of the galleys and the main city squares. The youth Bourgognino takes revenge on Gianettino Doria for raping his bride by striking him down, as he has sworn to do. Andreas Doria flees. The city seems to be entirely in Fiesco's hands but there is still widespread confusion. Disobeying her husband and dressed in men's clothing, Leonore has gone into the streets with her servant Arabella. She observes the action with high-flown pride. She finds the dead Gianettino and with passionate enthusiasm puts on his purple cloak. Fiesco, who sees her rushing through the streets mistakes her for Doria and brings her down. When he realizes that he has just murdered his beloved wife, with whom he wanted to share his glory, he is plunged into deep despair. But then he quickly recovers.

If I understand this sign correctly, the fates have given me this wound only to test my heart for the greatness which is to come?….Genoa is waiting for me, you say? – I will give Genoa a prince of a kind never before seen in Europe – Come! – I will arrange such a memorial service for this unhappy princess that lovers of life will be envious, and decay and decomposition will be radiant as a bride – Now follow your duke.

=== Climax and dénouement ===
Indeed, Genoa is ready to recognize Fiesco joyously as the new duke. But Verrina keeps his vow. Using some excuse he lures Fiesco to the seaside, where he first wistfully and then on his knees begs him to renounce his purple robes. But Fiesco remains firm, whereupon Verrina pushes him into the water. The heavy purple robe pulls him down to the depths. The conspirators arrive at the beach shortly thereafter with the news that Andreas Doria has returned. They ask about Fiesco's whereabouts. "He drowned", is Verrina's answer, "Or, if it sounds better, he was drowned – I am going to Andreas". Everyone remains standing, frozen in rigid groups. The curtain falls.

== Fiesco and the adventure of freedom ==
"True greatness of heart", wrote Schiller in 1788 in the eleventh of his twelve letters about Don Carlos, "leads no less often to a violation of the freedom of others than does egoism and a thirst for power, because it acts for the sake of the deed and not the individual subject".

Magnanimity of character was for Schiller, an admirer of the antique biographies of Plutarch, always appealing. This was also true for the figure of "Count Fiesque". He is described in the historical tradition as strong, handsome, crafty, popular with women, from a proud noble family, and filled with unrestrained political ambition. But it is not clear whether he wanted to free Genoa from princely rule or assume power himself. As a Renaissance Man he is beyond any categorization as good or evil. Greatness of personality makes him a hero for Schiller, regardless of whether virtuous or criminal.

In a postscript to the Mannheim stage version he writes,

Fiesco, a mighty, fearsome person who, under the deceptive camouflage of an effeminate, epicurean idler, in quiet, noiseless darkness, like an engendering spirit hovering above chaos, alone and unobserved, giving birth to a new world while wearing the empty, smiling expression of a good-for-nothing, while enormous plans and raging wishes ferment in his fiery breast – Fiesco, long enough misunderstood, finally emerges like a god to present his mature and masterly work to an amazed public, and then finds himself a relaxed observer when the wheels of the great machine unavoidably run counter to the desired goal.

In his hero, Schiller wanted to put someone on the stage who is incomprehensible, a person of overwhelming impenetrability, who is so free that he incorporates both possibilities, a tyrant and a liberator from tyranny. When Schiller began working on the play he had not decided which possibility to select. If he had been able to decide, he would also have known how the piece should end. But he did not know that until everything was finished except for the last two scenes. Fiesco does not know until the end what he is going to do, because Schiller does not know what he should have him do. Fiesco remains undecided, as Schiller does. This was true until beginning of November 1782, when he finally decided on one of the two different endings. And both are absolutely logical, because Fiesco is free enough to decide for either option. Schiller mentioned to Streicher in this context that the two last scenes, "cost him much more thinking" then all the rest of the play.

Rüdiger Safranski's biography Lit. comes to the conclusion that Schiller, the "freedom enthusiast", is not concerned in Fiesco about how one should act, but rather about what action one truly wants. "It is not a matter of what one should want, but what one wants to want". What Schiller shows is, according to Safranski, that "freedom is what makes people unpredictable, both to themselves and to others".

In The Robbers, Schiller took as his theme "the victim of extravagant emotions". In Fiesco he attempted "the opposite, a victim of artifice and intrigue". The concern about the appropriateness for the stage of a "cold, sterile affair of state" is expressed by the author himself in his preface: "If it is true that only emotions can give rise to emotions, then, it seems to me, a political hero is no subject for the stage to the extent to which he has to disregard people in order to become a political hero". Nevertheless, 75 performances proved the play's outstanding success. (See above).

Today, however, Fiesco's Conspiracy at Genoa appears relatively seldom on the German stage. One reason could be Schiller's relation to democracy. In the eighth scene of the second act he presents a "crowd scene" with twelve (!) workmen. These people know precisely what they do not want (the establishment of absolutistic reign in Genoa), but not what they want instead. In their perplexity they turn to Fiesco, who should "rescue" them. He tells them a fable in which rule by a large, fierce dog is to be replaced with rule by a lion (in other words, the rule of the Dorias replaced with rule by Fiesco). He persuades them to give up their wish to establish a democracy by pointing out that democracy is "the rule of the cowardly and the stupid", that there are more cowardly people than courageous ones and more stupid people than clever ones, and that in a democracy the majority rules. Their cheers confirm Fiesco's opinion, whereupon he becomes euphorically confident of victory.

The view that democracy means "the rule of the cowardly and the stupid" and that, accordingly, the rule of a "benevolent prince" is preferable, is not considered appropriate today, but it was common in Schiller's time, also because of the reception of Plato's Politeia (The Republic), where Plato shows, among other things, that in the end it is better for all members of a society if those people rule who are best suited to rule. And in Plato's opinion that is only a tiny minority. Plato has Socrates say that the majority is better suited to other tasks, such as national defense, trade, manufacture, etc., and if everybody does what he can do best, that is best for everyone. This view can also be sensed in Schiller's poem Lied von der Glocke (Song of the Bell): "The master can break open the form / with a careful hand at the proper time / But beware, if in flaming streams /the glowing metal frees itself!" Fiesco's problem is also that he would perhaps rather be the "fox" than the "lion" (the "masterly" and thus legitimate ruler in the fable), in other words, he asks himself whether he is really "better" than the "large, fierce dog". In the play Fiesco is himself unable to decide between republican and monarchic ideals, and almost gives in to the urging of his wife Leonore to give up his desire to rule in favor of love and conventional family life, but only almost. He is a tragic hero in the Aristotelian sense to the extent that he also has shortcomings, and in the play's original conclusion these actually bring about his downfall (he is murdered). In the later stage version, Schiller altered the tragic end into a surprisingly happy one, in which Fiesco does without a crown and the monarchy becomes a republic. After 1790 this was interpreted as a stand in favor of revolution, and this version of the play was accordingly often prohibited.

== Schiller’s understanding of historical veracity on the stage ==
Schiller immersed himself in historical accounts while working on Fiesco; he pored over trade statistics and studied documents about the daily life of the time in order to obtain a feeling for the historical veracity of the conspiracy of 1547, something which had interested him already as he was writing his third dissertation. For reasons similar to Sallust in The Conspiracy of Catiline, apparently, whom he quotes right at the beginning of the piece.

Nam id facinus inprimis ego memorabile existimo sceleris atque periculi novitate. (Because I consider it an undertaking absolutely worthy of recording, due to the unusual nature of his guilt and what threatens him.)

However, different from the historian Sallust, Schiller was not concerned with the historical events in order to acquaint the public with them in this way, but rather to give his dramatic character a historically plausible background. The theatrical effect of likelihood was more important to him than historical truth per se. Schiller makes this view clear in his postscript to the stage version, and it is also the reason why he presents a free interpretation of the conspiracy and Fiesco's death.

I expect to soon come to grips with the history, since I am not his (Fiesco’s) chronicler, and as far as I am concerned, a single, great surge in the breasts of my audience caused by my daring fabrication makes up for any rigidly historical precision.

== Literature ==
(in German) Matthias Luserke-Jaqui: Friedrich Schiller. (A. Francke), Tübingen, Basel 2005
(in German) Rüdiger Safranski: Schiller oder Die Erfindung des Deutschen Idealismus. (Hanser), München 2004, ISBN 3-446-20548-9
