= E.T.A. Hoffmann. Das Leben eines skeptischen Phantasten =

1984 book by Rüdiger Safranski

- Author: Rüdiger Safranski
- Language: German
- Subject: E. T. A. Hoffmann
- Genre: biography
- Publisher: Carl Hanser Verlag
- Publication date: 1984
- Publication place: West Germany
- Pages: 533
- ISBN: 3446138226

E.T.A. Hoffmann. Das Leben eines skeptischen Phantasten (lit. 'E. T. A. Hoffmann: The Life of a Sceptical Fantasist') is a biography of E. T. A. Hoffmann, written by the German philosopher Rüdiger Safranski and published in 1984 by Carl Hanser Verlag. It was Safranski's first biography, a genre he would come to specialise in.
