= Varrak =

Company based in Estonia

- Type: Public (Aktsiaselts)
- Industry: Book publisher
- Founded: 1991
- Headquarters: Tallinn, Estonia
- Key people: Priit Maide, Maret Maide
- Website: www.varrak.ee

Varrak is an Estonian book publishing company founded in 1991, which quickly grew to one of the most popular book publishers in Estonia. It publishes both Estonian and translated works, including children's books, biographies, fiction and history books.

The company is named after a character in the Estonian epic poem Kalevipoeg.

== History ==
Varrak was founded in 1991 by Priit and Maret Maide. They had 1000 rubles, which could buy 1.5–2 tons of paper. She wanted to try to run a book publishing company, knowing that they had nothing to lose on the money. Maret had two works – a book about cocktails compiled by her, and her translation of William Somerset Maugham's The Painted Veil, which is now published by Estonian publisher Canopus, which is known for publishing many other books by Maugham. Alongside Varrak, other publishers started as well, including Huma, Monokkel and half a year later, the schoolbook publisher Koolibri.

Their first translator was Krista Kaer, who started working at Varrak in 1992. Arthur Conan Doyle's stories of Sherlock Holmes were the first work of translation after The Painted Veil. In 1993, Varrak published the translation of Brideshead Revisited, this time translated by Henno Rajandi. In 1996, Kaer came to work translating at Varrak as a full-time job, and the company made their first partnership with Dorling Kindersley.

As of 2017, Varrak was Estonia's best-selling fiction publisher.

=== Book club ===
In 1998, Varrak and Yhtyneet Kuvalehdet OY, publisher of the magazine Suomen Kuvalehti of Finland, cooperated to create the first Estonian book club, known as Suur Eesti Raamatuklubi ("Large Estonian Book Club", shortened as "SERK"), a promotional effort that would allow its members lower prices on Varrak's books. The club also provided a monthly newsletter, alongside a Book of the Month, which would be extensively promoted in the newsletter. The club was then broken to two individual clubs in 2006, forming SERK and the Varrak book club, the latter of which than included 15,000 members. The two rejoined in 2008 back into SERK, now with 35,000 members.

== Authors ==
=== Estonian authors ===
Notable Estonian authors whose works are published exclusively by Varrak include:

- Aime Hansen
- Urmas Laansoo

=== Foreign authors ===
Foreign authors whose works have been translated into Estonian exclusively for Varrak include:

- Agatha Christie
- Ann Granger
- Dick Francis
- Fay Weldon
- George R. R. Martin
- John Grisham
- Lee Child
- Louise Penny
- Santa Montefiore
- Simon Sebag Montefiore
- Stefan Klein
- Stieg Larsson
- Sofi Oksanen (mother was Estonian, father was Finnish)
