= Martin Heidegger: Between Good and Evil =

1994 book by Rüdiger Safranski

- Title page for Ein Meister aus Deutschland. Heidegger und seine Zeit (1994)
- Author: Rüdiger Safranski
- Original title: Ein Meister aus Deutschland. Heidegger und seine Zeit
- Translator: Ewald Osers
- Language: German
- Subject: Martin Heidegger
- Genre: biography
- Publisher: Carl Hanser Verlag
- Publication date: 1994
- Publication place: Germany
- English publication date: 15 April 1998
- Pages: 520
- ISBN: 978-3-446-17874-8

Martin Heidegger: Between Good and Evil (German: Ein Meister aus Deutschland. Heidegger und seine Zeit) is a 1994 biography of the philosopher Martin Heidegger, written by Rüdiger Safranski. It confronts Heidegger as someone who participated in a particularly German way of studying being, which Heidegger, according to Safranski, pushed further than anyone else, and where incomprehension became a deliberate feature due to a disbelief in the active human mind. The German title, which means "A Master from Germany", is an allusion to the poem "Todesfuge" by Paul Celan.

Richard Rorty reviewed the book for The New York Times and wrote that it manages to display both Heidegger's pettiness and imaginative power. He called it "the first comprehensive biography of the man" and wrote that it supersedes books about Heidegger and Nazism by Victor Farías and Hugo Ott.
