= Romanticism: A German Affair =

2007 book by Rüdiger Safranski

- Author: Rüdiger Safranski
- Original title: Romantik. Eine deutsche Affäre
- Translator: Robert E. Goodwin
- Language: German
- Subject: Romanticism
- Publisher: Carl Hanser Verlag
- Publication date: 15 August 2007
- Publication place: Germany
- English publication date: 2014
- Pages: 416
- ISBN: 978-3-446-20944-2

Romanticism: A German Affair (German: Romantik. Eine deutsche Affäre) is a 2007 book by the German writer Rüdiger Safranski. It is about Romanticism which it takes a broad approach to, stretching from the middle of the 18th century to the movement's continuing impact in the second half of the 20th century.
