= Wieviel Wahrheit braucht der Mensch? =

1990 book by Rüdiger Safranski

- Author: Rüdiger Safranski
- Language: German
- Publisher: Carl Hanser Verlag
- Publication date: 1990; 36 years ago
- Publication place: Germany
- Pages: 208
- ISBN: 3446160450

Wieviel Wahrheit braucht der Mensch? Über das Denkbare und das Lebbare (lit. 'How Much Truth Does Man Need? On the Conceivable and the Liveable') is a book by the German philosopher Rüdiger Safranski, published in 1990 by Carl Hanser Verlag.

== Summary ==
The book is an examination of the search for truth. It covers subjects such as the writings of Jean-Jacques Rousseau, Heinrich von Kleist and Friedrich Nietzsche, conflicts between conceived truth and reality, and metaphysics, where truth is located separately from the world.
