= Goethe: Life as a Work of Art =

2013 book by Rüdiger Safranski

- German language original Goethe. Kunstwerk des Lebens (2013)
- Author: Rüdiger Safranski
- Original title: Goethe. Kunstwerk des Lebens
- Translator: David Dollenmayer
- Language: German
- Subject: Johann Wolfgang von Goethe
- Genre: biography
- Publisher: Carl Hanser Verlag
- Publication date: 26 August 2013
- Publication place: Germany
- English publication date: 16 May 2017
- Pages: 752
- ISBN: 978-3-446-23581-6

Goethe: Life as a Work of Art (German: Goethe. Kunstwerk des Lebens) is a biography about Johann Wolfgang von Goethe by the German writer Rüdiger Safranski. It was published by Carl Hanser Verlag in 2013.

== Summary ==
The book is a biography that focuses on the thoughts of the German writer and philosopher Johann Wolfgang von Goethe (1749–1832). It covers Goethe's status in Europe and high self-esteem established with his early successes Götz von Berlichingen and The Sorrows of Young Werther, his interactions with contemporaries such as Wolfgang Amadeus Mozart, Voltaire, Friedrich Schiller and Arthur Schopenhauer, the profound influence his journey to Italy had on his cultural ideals, his interest in natural science and his views regarding theology.

== Reception ==
Publishers Weekly called it "a learned and arguably definitive account of Johann Wolfgang von Goethe". Kirkus Reviews wrote that Safranski "brings sensitivity and authority to a sweeping chronicle of Goethe's life".
