= Einzeln sein =

2021 book by Rüdiger Safranski

- Author: Rüdiger Safranski
- Language: German
- Publisher: Carl Hanser Verlag
- Publication date: 23 August 2021
- Publication place: Germany
- Pages: 288
- ISBN: 978-3-446-25671-2

Einzeln sein. Eine philosophische Herausforderung (lit. 'Being Separate: A Philosophical Challenge') is a 2021 book by the German philosopher Rüdiger Safranski. It is about individuality, which it covers by portraying historical thinkers from the Renaissance to the middle of the 20th century.

== Summary ==
Safranski presents an intellectual history of being alone and the tension between being an individual and belonging to a society. The book contains 16 chapters or essays that portray people from the Renaissance until the middle of the 20th century, focusing their attempts to discover and cultivate individuality. Among the people portrayed are Martin Luther, Michel de Montaigne, Jean-Jacques Rousseau, Denis Diderot, Søren Kierkegaard, Stefan George, Jean-Paul Sartre, Karl Jaspers, Hannah Arendt, Ernst Jünger and Ricarda Huch.

== Reception ==
Jens Balzer of Deutschlandfunk Kultur wrote that the book is entertaining and clever, and manages to give a sense of intellectual evolution without trying to force its subjects into a conceived progress. Balzer wrote that the book showcases Safranski's skill at combining biography with philosophical considerations. He criticised the book's historical scope, as its chronology ends with Jünger's The Forest Passage from 1951, thus omitting important later developments even in the thinkers it portrays. Thomas Ribi of the Neue Zürcher Zeitung wrote that the chapters about Stendhal, Kierkegaard and Huch are masterpieces. Ribi wrote that although Safranski avoids generalisation, there is a theme about the individual's need to belong to a society while at the same time life cannot be too limited by belonging.
