= Schaaffhausen =

Schaaffhausen is a surname. Notable people with the surname include:

- Hermann Schaaffhausen (1816–1893), German anatomist, anthropologist, and paleoanthropologist
- Sibylle Mertens-Schaaffhausen (1797–1857), German art collector and musician
