= Nietzsche: A Philosophical Biography =

2000 book by Rüdiger Safranski

- Author: Rüdiger Safranski
- Original title: Nietzsche. Biographie seines Denkens
- Translator: Shelley Frisch
- Language: German
- Subject: philosophy of Friedrich Nietzsche
- Genre: biography
- Publisher: Carl Hanser Verlag
- Publication date: 2000
- Publication place: Germany
- English publication date: 2002
- Pages: 400
- ISBN: 9783446199385

Nietzsche: A Philosophical Biography (German: Nietzsche. Biographie seines Denkens) is a biography of the German philosopher Friedrich Nietzsche, written by Rüdiger Safranski and published by Carl Hanser Verlag in 2000. It focuses on the developments and changes of Nietzsche's philosophy, with little discussion of his personal life. The final chapter is about Nietzsche's influence in the 20th century. Publishers Weekly wrote that the book "brings out contradictions and tensions in Nietzsche's thought without dismissing him".
