= Der Zauberer von Meßkirch =

1989 documentary film

- Directed by: Ulrich Boehm; Rüdiger Safranski
- Country of origin: West Germany
- Original language: German

Production
- Producer: Friedhelm Maye
- Cinematography: Günter Rumpsfeld
- Editors: J.-Sibylle Ewel-Hohnstock; Anja Wetzel
- Running time: 59 minutes
- Production company: Westdeutscher Rundfunk

Original release
- Network: West 3
- Release: 23 January 1989

Der Zauberer von Meßkirch (lit. 'The Magician of Meßkirch') is a 1989 documentary film about the German philosopher Martin Heidegger. It was directed by Ulrich Boehm and Rüdiger Safranski for Westdeutscher Rundfunk. It premiered on West 3 on 23 January 1989.

== See also ==
- Meßkirch
