= Sibylle Mertens-Schaaffhausen =

German art collector (1797–1857)

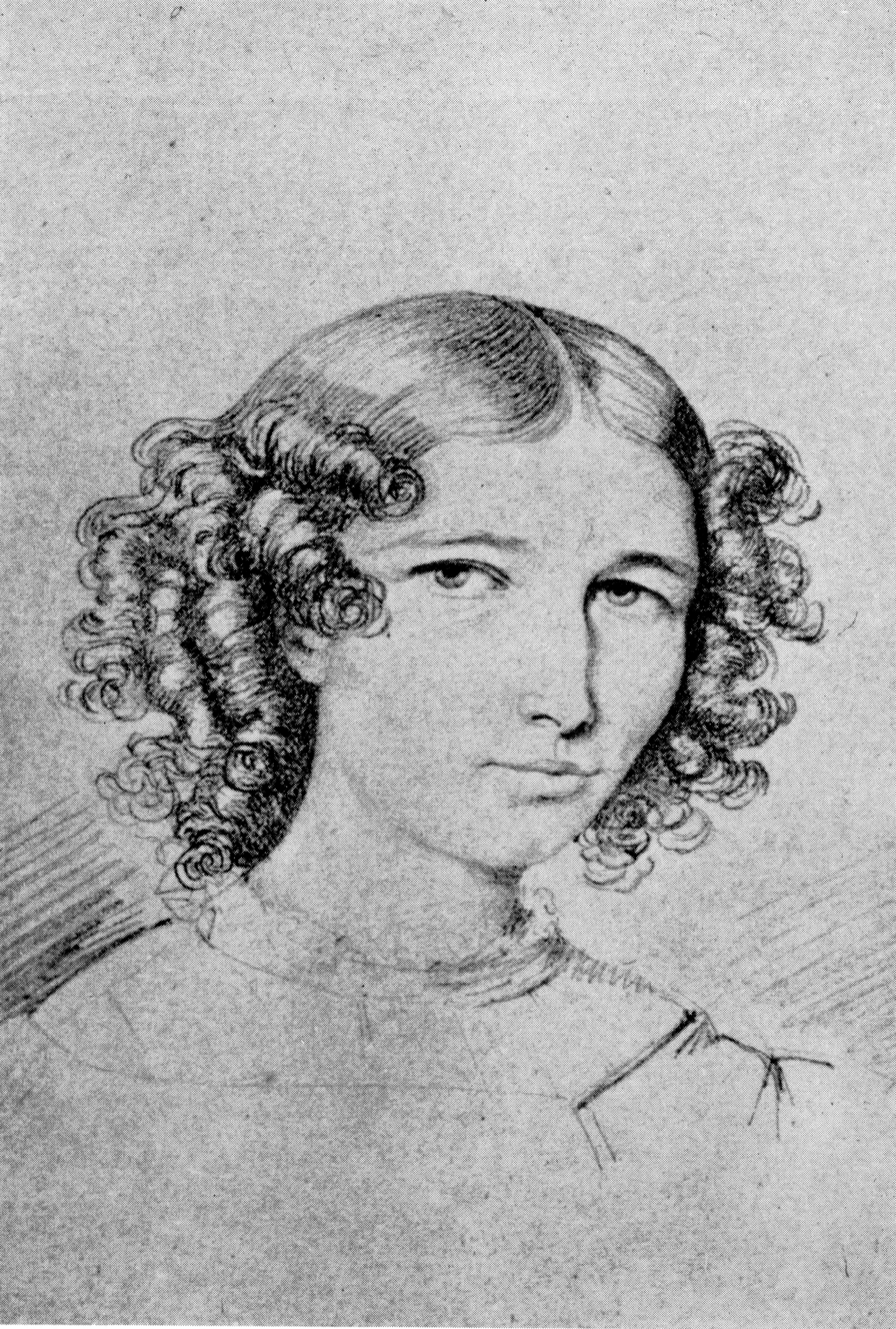
- 1820 drawing by Heinrich Rapp
- Born: January 29, 1797; Cologne, Electorate of Cologne
- Died: October 22, 1857 (aged 60); Rome, Papal States
- Occupations: Archaeologist and art collector

Sibylle Mertens-Schaaffhausen (29 January 1797 – 22 October 1857) was a German art collector and musician who became significant due in part to interest in archaeology. She hosted a salon of importance. She became notable for knowledge of gems and coins and was invited to scientific meetings in Rome. She supported the German revolutions of 1848–49 and had affectionate relationships with women such as Adele Schopenhauer. She has been referred to as the "countess from the Rhine," and her nation's first recognized female archaeologist.

In 1816, she married a banker from Cologne, Joseph Ludwig Mertens. He was 16 years older than she was. Although they had six children together, the marriage was an unhappy one from the beginning. A divorce however was out of the question due to religious reasons. Annette von Droste-Hülshoff, a writer from her salon and close friend, called it an 'Ehehölle', "marital hell". Their wealth made it possible for them to live separate lives: she lived mostly on Schloss Petersburg, while her husband lived mostly in Cologne. Although it is suggested that her relationship to women extended to nothing more than "loyal friendships", there is strong evidence that she was a lesbian, something she could not express in public. The intimate entries in her diary, which she left to her long time lover Laurina Spinola, are testimony to this. Other notable female lovers include Adele Schopenhauer, sister to the famous German philosopher, with whom she had lived together since 1826, along with the mother Johanna Schopenhauer. After the death of Laurina, the two women grew closer again.
