= Johanna Schopenhauer =

German writer (1766–1838)

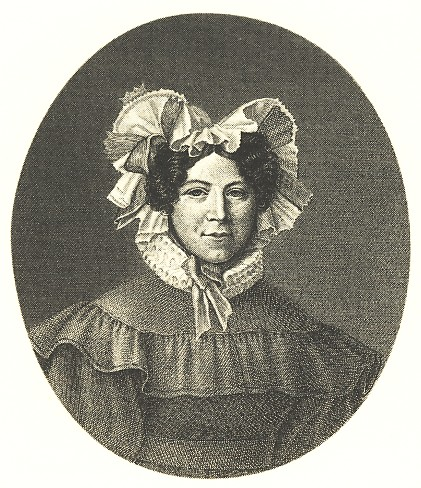
- Johanna Schopenhauer in 1800
- Born: Johanna Henriette Trosiener; 9 July 1766; Danzig (Gdańsk), Royal Prussia, Kingdom of Poland
- Died: 17 April 1838 (aged 71); Jena, Kingdom of Prussia, German Confederation
- Citizenship: Polish, German
- Occupation: Author
- Spouse: Heinrich Floris Schopenhauer (m. 1785–1805)
- Children: Arthur Schopenhauer; Adele Schopenhauer
- Writing career
- Language: German

Johanna Schopenhauer (née Trosiener; 9 July 1766 – 17 April 1838) was a German writer and salonnière. She was the mother of the philosopher Arthur Schopenhauer and author Adele Schopenhauer.

== Biography ==
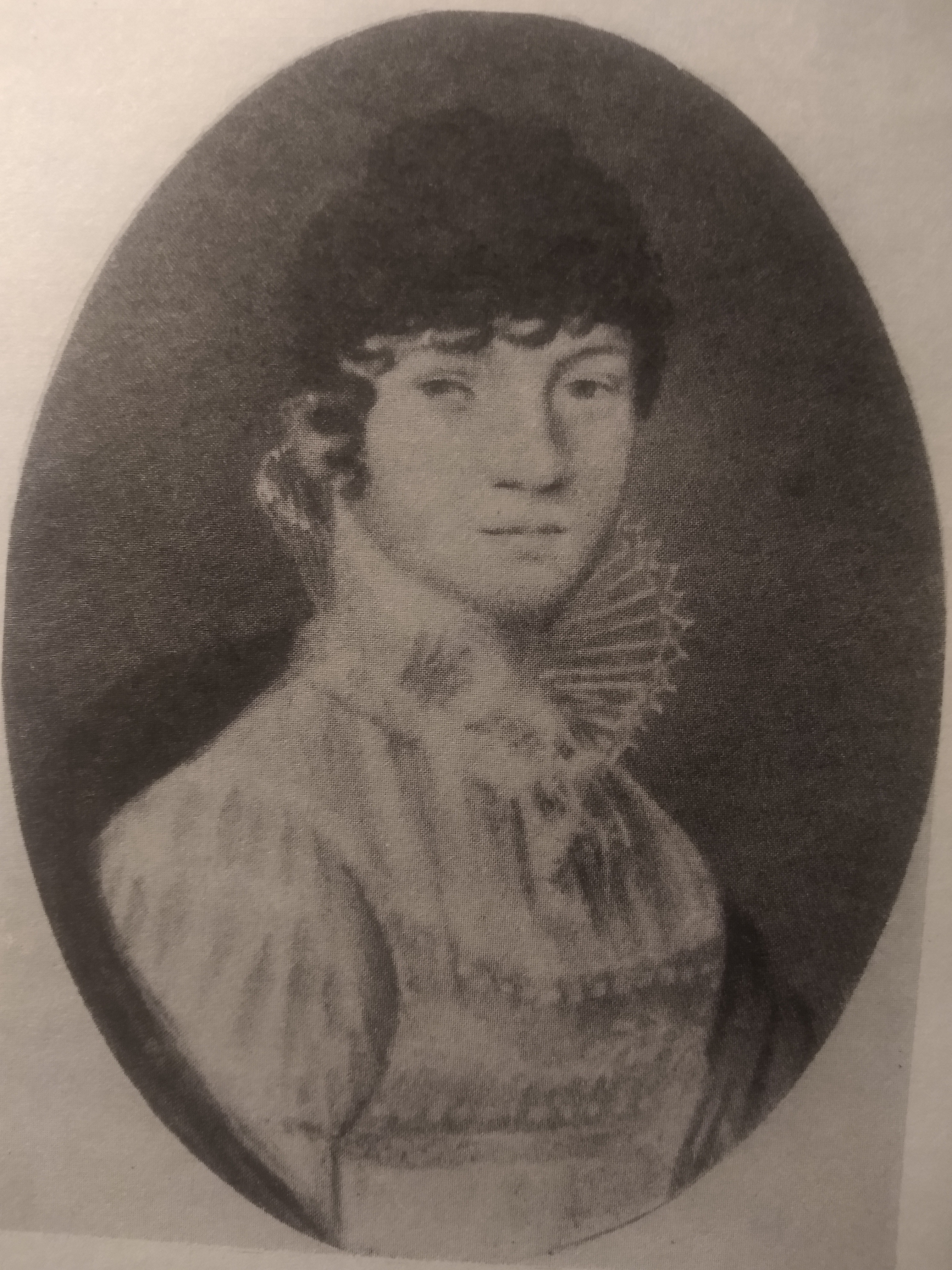
Johanna as an adolescent

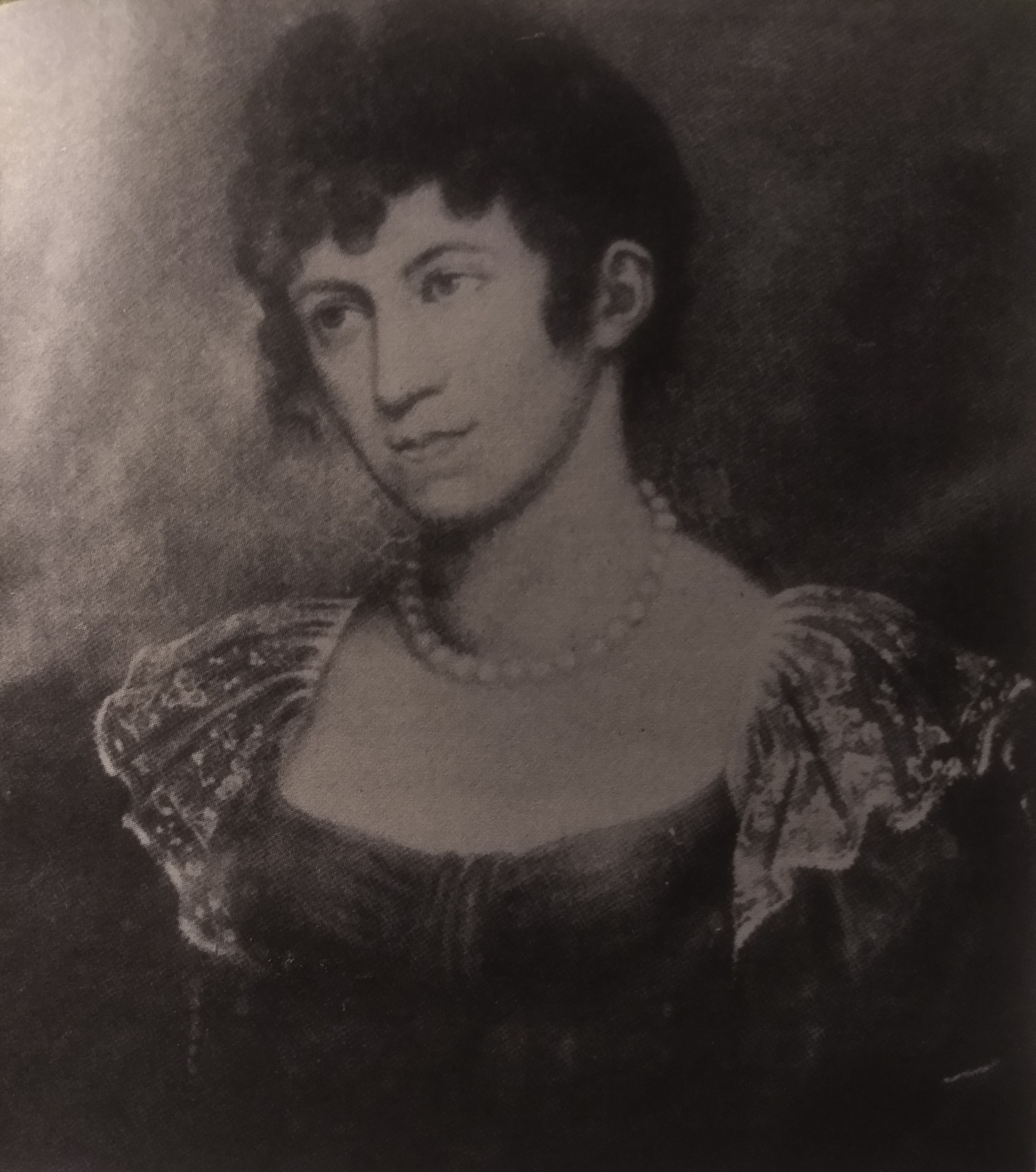
Johanna Schopenhauer. Oil on canvas by Gerhard Kügelgen, 1817

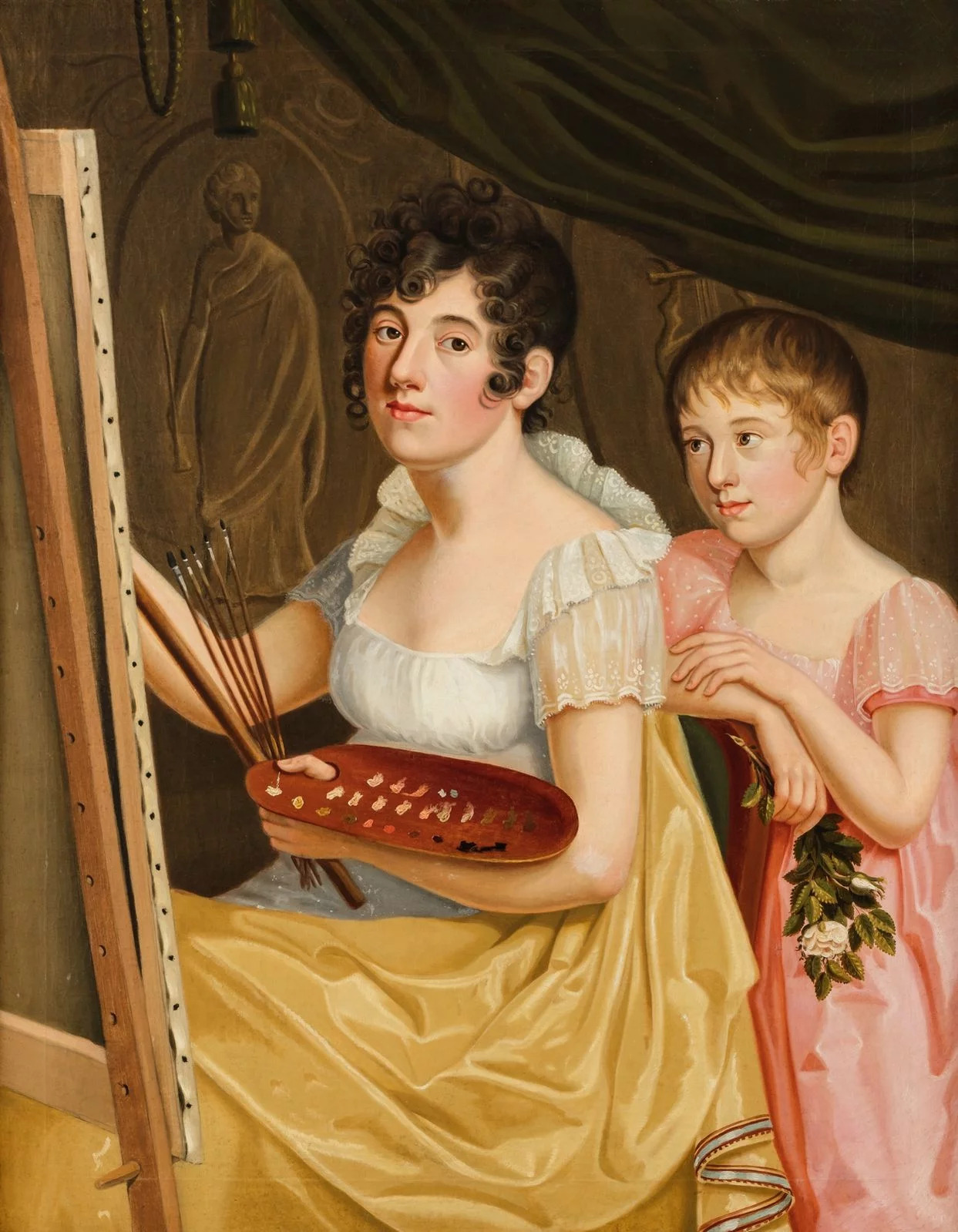
Johanna Schopenhauer with her daughter Adele in 1806. Painting by Caroline Bardua.

Johanna Schopenhauer was born in Danzig (Gdańsk), in the Crown of the Kingdom of Poland, to a family of middle-class merchants. Her parents were Christian Heinrich Trosiener (1730–1797) and Elisabeth Trosiener, nee Lehmann (1745–1818). Her father was also a councillor in the city. She was the eldest child in the family, and had three younger sisters, Charlotte Elizabeth (1768–1828), who married Felix Ratzky, Anna (1769–1814) and Juliane Dorothea (1773–1849). She was a precocious girl, sensitive to art and with great talent for learning foreign languages. Before turning 10, she already knew Polish, French, and English apart from her native German. As a youth, she aspired to become a painter, a desire her parents however nipped right in the bud, considering it improper that a girl of her class exercised "a trade."

On May 16, 1785, at age 18, she married Heinrich Floris Schopenhauer (1747–1805), a much wealthier merchant twenty years her senior. He was to become the father of her two children, Arthur and Adele, who were born in 1788 and 1797, respectively. In her autobiography, in which Johanna promised to tell the facts of her life "without poetry", Johanna made clear that she "no more pretended ardent love to him than he demanded it". She denied, however, that she came under pressure from her parents to marry Heinrich Floris. On the contrary, she subtly admitted that what attracted her to a union with him was his social rank and the possibilities that his wealth could open to her. The marriage was stable, but from the beginning Johanna felt that her happiness and that of her husband depended on her resignation to his will.

In 1793, the family moved to Hamburg when Danzig became part of Prussia as part of the Second Partition of Poland. In 1805, a year after her husband's death, Johanna and her daughter moved to Weimar, a town where Johanna had neither relatives nor close friends and which was, moreover, about to be the stage of war between Prussia and the invading troops of Napoleon. Though Johanna did not know of the imminent risk of war, she refused to leave the city when the situation became clear, as transportation was only available to her and her daughter, and her servants would have to be left to their own fate.

During the war, Johanna was active in providing services to those in need, nursing German soldiers and giving asylum to less fortunate citizens, whose houses had been taken over by French soldiers. With that, she quickly became a popular figure in Weimar.

After the war, she gained a high reputation as a salonnière (as she had planned before she left Hamburg), and for years to come her semiweekly parties were attended by several literary celebrities: Christoph Martin Wieland, the Schlegel brothers August and Friedrich, Ludwig Tieck, and, above all, Johann Wolfgang von Goethe, whose awareness was probably what attracted Johanna to Weimar in the first place. Goethe's endorsement was a big factor behind Johanna's social success, and what greatly contributed to their friendship was that Johanna was the first upper-class woman in Weimar to open the doors of her house to Christiane Vulpius, Goethe's mistress, who had hitherto been excluded from the shining social scene of the city owing not only to her lowly background, but also to the fact that Goethe and Vulpius were no more than lovers, despite living together.

At first, Arthur Schopenhauer chose to stay in Hamburg. At that moment he had every intention to fulfil a promise made to his father, that of concluding his merchant apprenticeship, however much that pained him and however much he would have preferred to study philosophy. Johanna encouraged her son to leave these studies behind and follow his desire to become a scholar.

Mother and son, however, did not get along. In letters written to Schopenhauer, Johanna makes it very clear how distressed she was at her son's pessimism, his arrogance, and his imperious ways. In one letter, she wrote: "You are unbearable and burdensome, and very hard to live with; all your good qualities are overshadowed by your conceit, and made useless to the world simply because you cannot restrain your propensity to pick holes in other people." (She destroyed his letters to her.) When, in 1809, Schopenhauer finally moved to Weimar, he established himself, not in his mother's house, but in that of his young instructor, Franz Passow, as it was the mother's impression that living under the same roof as her son was a bad idea. In 1813, she finally allowed him to move into her house, renting him a room, but the arrangement was soon broken after frequent arguments, motivated by Johanna's friendship with another lodger, a younger man called Georg von Gerstenbergk.

After 1814, mother and son never met again. All the communication between the two was from then on through letters, but even this was interrupted after Johanna read a correspondence from Schopenhauer to his sister Adele, where he blamed their mother for the death of their father, understood to have been by suicide, accusing her of going to amuse herself at parties while Heinrich Floris was bedridden, sick and abandoned to the care of a loyal employee. In 1819, however, Schopenhauer made an attempt to approach his family. That year, the Schopenhauer ladies lost most of their fortune in a banking crisis. Schopenhauer volunteered to share with them the inheritance he received from his father, but Johanna refused the offer.

It was only in 1831 that the correspondence between mother and son resumed. It was Arthur who took the first step, motivated, apparently, by his many difficulties: from the failure to sell his books to his bodily ailments. The correspondence continued sporadically until Johanna's death in 1838. Despite the cordial tone of the last communications between Johanna and Arthur, the latter continued to speak ill of her even after her death, making little of Johanna's mother skills and painting her as a thoroughly self-centered woman. For her part, in her will Johanna made Adele her sole heir. But this was probably intended not so much to slight her son as in recognition that her daughter would be in greater difficulties in future years, since Arthur not only managed to conserve his part of the fatherly inheritance but even doubled it, whereas Adele would have few resources at her disposal.

In Weimar, Johanna Schopenhauer made a name as an author. She was the first German woman to publish books without a pseudonym, and from the late 1810s to the early 1830s, her works turned her into the most famous woman author in Germany. In 1831, her books received a second edition, and the collection filled no less than 24 volumes. Despite all this production, her critical acclaim and commercial success, Johanna was never able to make up for the financial losses of the 1810s. Unable to maintain their lifestyle in Weimar, and also for health reasons, Johanna and Adele moved to Bonn. In the mid-1830s, Johanna's fame declined and their financial situation worsened. Almost without resources, Johanna wrote to the Duke of Weimar detailing her plight. In 1837, the Duke, in recognition of Johanna's fame and contribution to the city's culture, offered her a small pension and invited her to move to Jena. Johanna died there the following year. She left incomplete the manuscript of her last work, her autobiography, which narrates her early life until shortly after Arthur's birth.

== Work ==
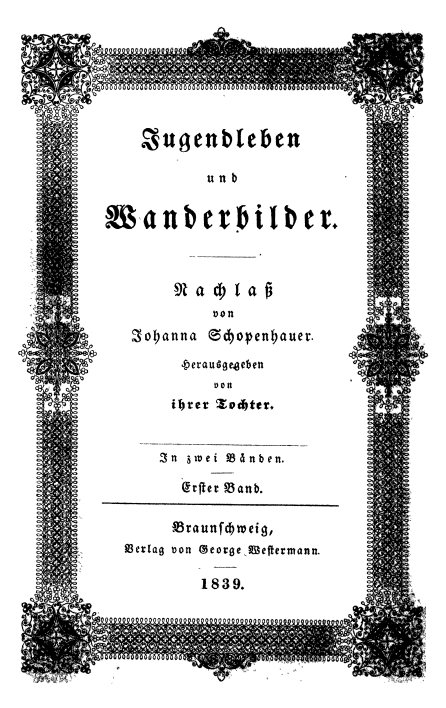
Cover of Schopenhauer's Jugendleben und Wanderbilder

Not long after her arrival in Weimar, Schopenhauer began to publish her writings, consisting of articles on paintings with special attention on Jan van Eyck's work. These were later published in two volumes in 1822.

In 1810, she published her first book: a biography of her friend Karl Ludwig Fernow, who had died two years before. She wrote the book with the generous intention to pay Fernow's heirs' debts with his editor. The work met with critical success, which encouraged Johanna to pursue a career as an author, on which her livelihood and that of Adele would depend after the aforementioned financial crisis.

First came the publication of her travelogues. Prior to Heinrich Floris' death, the family made trips through Western Europe, mostly in order to help Arthur, then a teenager, develop the skills of a merchant. But the trips were also of great use to Johanna, serving as raw material for her travelogues, which were very successful at the time they were published, decades later. In 1990, her travelogue to England and Scotland was translated into English by Chapman & Hall — Johanna's only book to be introduced to the Anglophone world since the turn of the 20th century. Then came her fiction work, which, for a little more than a decade, turned her into the most famous woman author in Germany. The following are her best known novels: Gabriele (1819), Die Tante (1823) and Sidonia (1827).

== Sources ==
- Cartwright, David (2010). Schopenhauer: A Biography. Cambridge University Press. ISBN 978-0-521-82598-6.
- Diethe, Carol (1998). Towards emancipation: German women writers of the nineteenth century. Berghahn Books. ISBN 9781571819338.
- Safranski, Rüdiger (1990). Schopenhauer and the Wild Years of Philosophy. Harvard University Press. ISBN 978-0-674-79275-3.
