= Reiner Stach =

German author

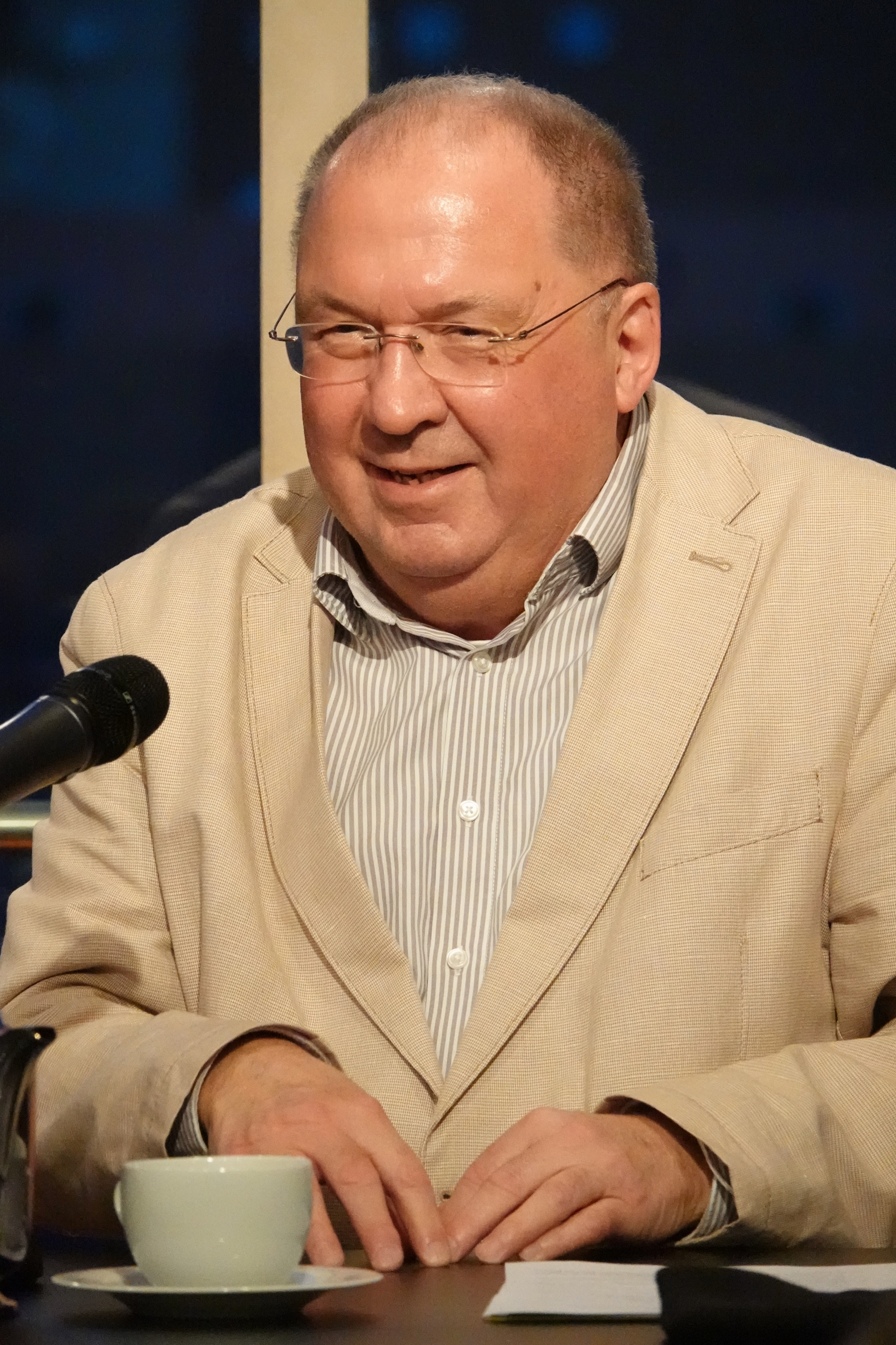
- Stach in 2024
- Born: 1951 (age 74–75); Rochlitz, East Germany
- Occupations: Biographer; publicist; publisher
- Writing career
- Language: German
- Notable works: Kafka – Die Jahre der Entscheidungen (Kafka: The Decisive Years), Kafka – Die Jahre der Erkenntnis (Kafka: The Years of Realization)

Reiner Stach (born 1951) is a German author, biographer of Franz Kafka, publisher, and publicist. Stach lives and works as a freelancer in Berlin.

== Early life and education ==
Stach was born in Rochlitz, Saxony. At age 17, he left home due to familial conflicts. He studied philosophy, literature, and mathematics at the Johann Wolfgang Goethe University in Frankfurt am Main. Stach graduated in 1985 with a PhD. His dissertation was titled Kafkas erotischer Mythos. Eine ästhetische Konstruktion des Weiblichen (Kafka's erotic myth. An aesthetic construction of femininity).

== Career ==
First Stach worked for major publishers as a science editor and publisher of nonfiction. He published several essays and reviews about the works of Hans Henny Jahnn and Franz Kafka, in various journals and anthologies, such as in the Neue Rundschau and in Revista de Libros, Madrid. He discovered the estate of Kafka's fiancée Felice Bauer in the United States and showed it as an exhibit "Kafka's Bride" in Frankfurt, Vienna, and Prague, among other places, during 1998 and 1999.

While Kafka had a relatively small literary output, his influence is so immense that Stach estimates there are at least 130,000 web sites devoted to him. Stach stopped his own internet count of Kafka sites when he got to 500 of them. There are dozens of Kafka biographies. Stach decided to write a detailed Kafka biographical trilogy because despite all this, "No definitive biography of Franz Kafka exists".

Stach divided his biography of Kafka into three volumes: from birth to age 27 (1910), the period when he wrote his most famous works (1910–1915), and everything thereafter (1916–1924). However, obtaining enough suitable research material for the period covering early family, childhood, adolescence, and early adulthood (1883–1910), relies in part on obtaining access to the estate of Max Brod in Tel Aviv, which has so far largely been inaccessible to research due to legal issues. Consequently, Stach decided to start writing this trilogy with period 1910–1915, the years Kafka's diaries start, so the first volume covers second chronological period. It took Stach about 10 years to write this volume. The first published volume of his Kafka biography, covering the years 1910 to 1915, appeared in 2002 as Kafka – Die Jahre der Entscheidungen (Kafka: The Decisive Years, literally: The years of decisions). This was translated into English in 2005 by Shelley Frisch. The second published volume, Kafka – Die Jahre der Erkenntnis (Kafka: The Years of Realization or "insight"), appeared in 2008, dealing with the last eight years of Kafka's life. This volume was published in English in late 2011. The final volume, covering the earliest chronological period, was published in German in 2014. An English translation of this volume by Shelley Frisch is slated for October 2016. The trilogy has been described as "massive" and going "into painstaking detail".

In 2008 he won a Special prize of the Heimito von Doderer-Literaturpreis for his biography Kafka – Die Jahre der Erkenntnis.

== Selected works ==
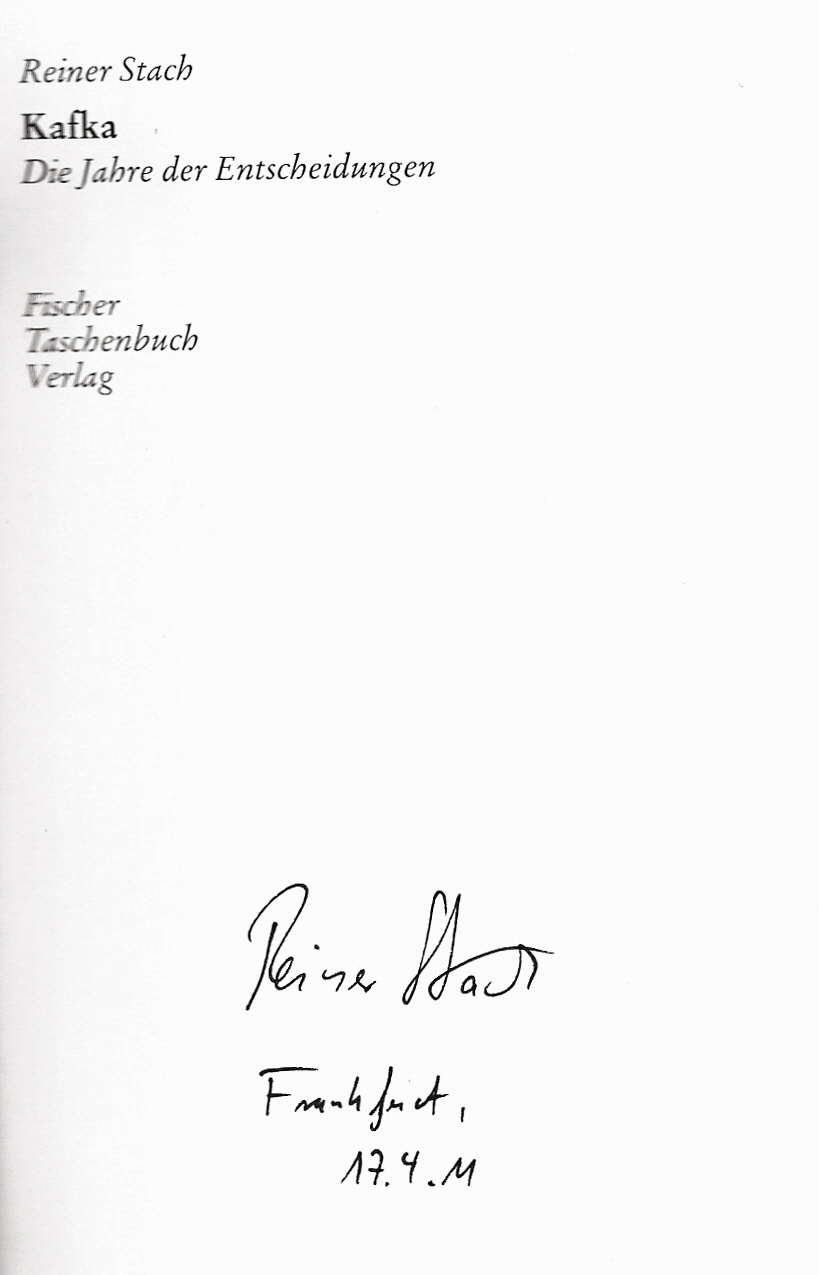
Stach's autograph on a paperback copy of Kafka: Die Jahre der Entscheidungen

- 100 Jahre S. Fischer Verlag 1886–1986. Kleine Verlagsgeschichte [100 Years of S. Fischer Verlag 1886–1986. A Brief History.]. Frankfurt am Main: S. Fischer Verlag. 1986. ISBN 978-3-100-75106-5.
- Kafkas erotischer Mythos. Eine ästhetische Konstruktion des Weiblichen [Kafka's Erotic Myth. An Aesthetic Construction of Femininity.]. Frankfurt am Main: Fischer Taschenbuch Verlag. 1987. ISBN 978-3-596-27370-6. (Dissertation, Johann Wolfgang Goethe-Universität Frankfurt am Main, 1985)
- Gottfried Bermann Fischer und Brigitte Bermann Fischer: Briefwechsel mit Autoren [Gottfried Bermann Fischer and Brigitte Bermann Fischer: Correspondence With Authors.]. Frankfurt am Main: S. Fischer Verlag. 1990. ISBN 978-3-100-21602-1.
- "Die fressende Schöpfung. Über Hans Henny Jahnns Romantrilogie Fluss ohne Ufer" [The Carnivorous Creation. About Hans Henny Jahnns Trilogy River Without Banks]. Forum Homosexualität und Literatur. 15. Siegen, Germany: Universität-GH Siegen: 41–50. 1992.
- "Stil, Motiv und fixe Idee: Über einige Untiefen der Jahnn-Lektüre" [Style, Motif, and Obsession: Some Lectures about Jahnn]. Literaturmagazin. 35. Berlin: Rowohlt Verlag: 79–92. 1995.
- Kafka – Die Jahre der Entscheidungen [Kafka — The Decisive Years]. Frankfurt am Main: S. Fischer Verlag. 2002. ISBN 978-3-10-075114-0.
- "Das Ärgernis Hans Henny Jahnn" [The Scandal of Hans Henny Jahnn]. Literaturen. 5. Berlin: Friedrich Berlin Verlag: 52–57. 2003.
- Kafka – Die Jahre der Erkenntnis [Kafka — Kafka — The Years of Insight]. Frankfurt am Main: S. Fischer Verlag. 2008. ISBN 978-3-10-075119-5.
- Kafkas Spiele. Eine kleine, kommentierte Kreuzfahrt durch Kafkas Nachlass [Kafka's Games. A small commented tour through Kafka's Legacy]. Düsseldorf: Onomato Verlag. 2011. ISBN 978-3-942864-19-0. (Audio Book)
- Ist das Kafka? 99 Fundstücke [Is that Kafka? 99 Finds]. Frankfurt am Main: S. Fischer Verlag. 2012. ISBN 978-3-10-075135-5.
- Kafka. Die frühen Jahre [Kafka. The Early Years.]. Frankfurt am Main: S. Fischer Verlag. 2014. ISBN 978-3-10-075130-0.
