= Óndra Łysohorsky =

Czech poet and translator

Óndra Łysohorsky was the pseudonym of Ervín Goj (6 July 1905 – 19 December 1989), a Czech poet of Silesian origin and awareness. He is known for his works written in the Lach dialects (intermediate between Czech and Polish), which he helped to systematize as a literary language. He also wrote in German; Friedrich Hölderlin was a large influence on his writing.

== Life ==
Born in Frýdek, Austrian Silesia, within Austria-Hungary, Goj began writing his poems around 1926, eventually making a name for himself in the 1930s shortly after adopting the Łysohorsky pseudonym. Following the Munich Conference, Łysohorsky quit his teaching post rather than collaborate with the Nazis. Upon German occupation, he fled to Poland, where he joined a Czechoslovak military force shortly before the outbreak of World War II in 1939. Captured by the Soviet Union early in the war, he was interned by the USSR briefly before moving to Moscow for several years.

While in Moscow his works first gained widespread recognition and were translated into Russian by several influential writers, including Boris Pasternak. He later returned to Czechoslovakia after the war, but was severely hampered in his career by the local Communist officials, who disdained his poems (often openly critical of the regime) and the fact that he published in a local dialect and in German rather than write in Czech. Frustrated by all successful attempts to block his accession of any academic posts offered to him, he appealed directly to Joseph Stalin via his Russian peers and was thus able to secure a teaching position and fellowship in local literary associations. He still continued to clash with the national authorities in the 1960s; following the successful publishing of a first volume of his collected Lachian poetry, the second volume was blocked from release by the government.

Nonetheless, over the course of decades following the war, a steady stream of Łysohorsky's work began to be translated and published abroad, such as an English release, Selected Poems (1970, ed. Ewald Osers), which included translations by W. H. Auden. David Gill also brought out a collection celebrating fifty years of Łysohorsky's poetry entitled In the Eye of the Storm (1976). While decently recognized by the international community during the Cold War, it appeared as of 2011 that none of his work currently remains in print in English.
