= Závažná Poruba =

- Municipality
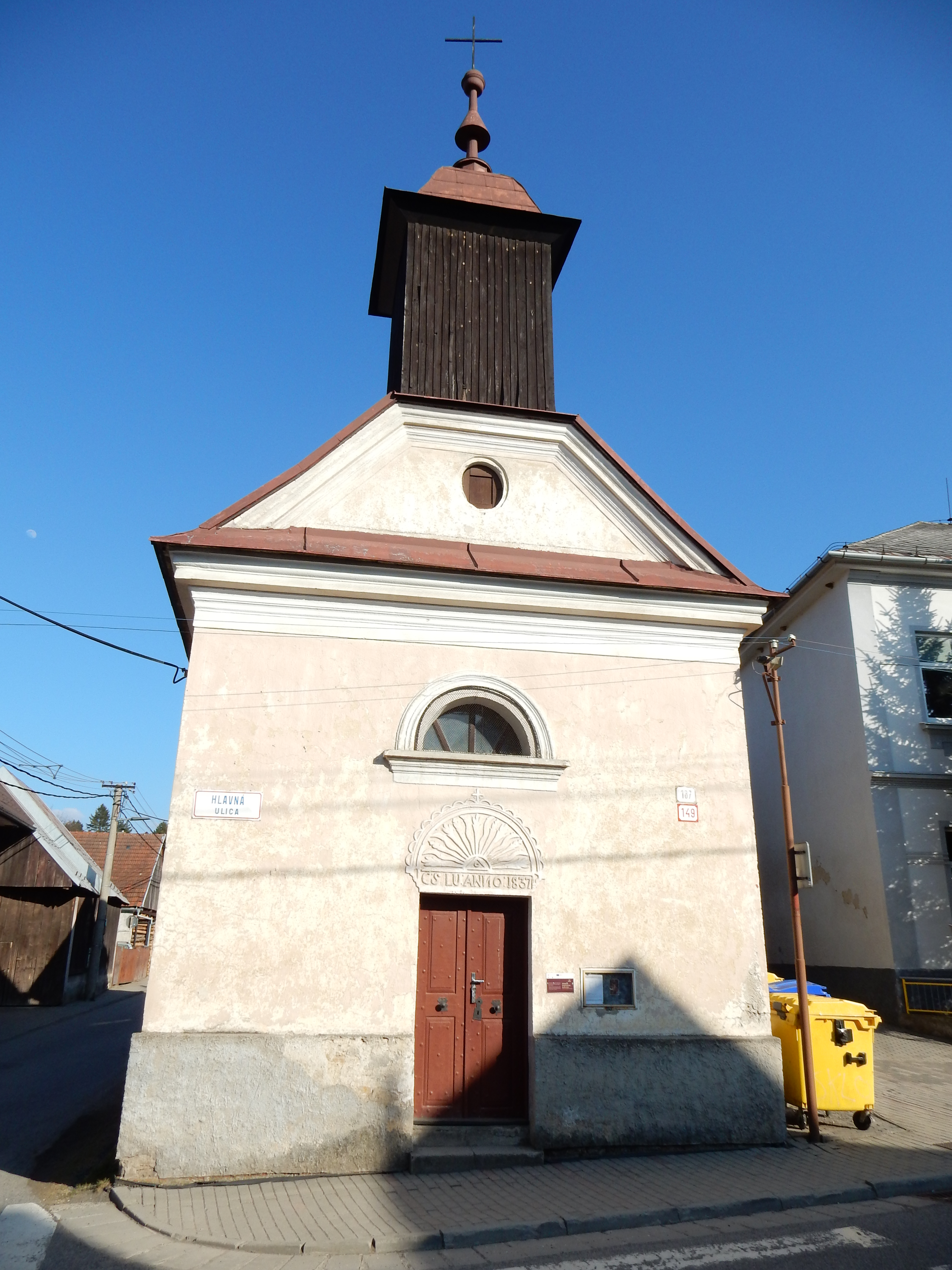

- Flag

- Location of Závažná Poruba in the Žilina Region Location of Závažná Poruba in Slovakia
- Coordinates: 49.07°N 19.65°E
- Country: Slovakia
- Region: Žilina Region
- District: Liptovský Mikuláš District
- First mentioned: 1263

Area
  - Total: 18.65 km^{2} (7.20 sq mi)
- Elevation: 616 m (2,021 ft)

Population (2025)
  - Total: 1,285
- Time zone: UTC+1 (CET)
  - Summer (DST): UTC+2 (CEST)
- Postal code: 310 2
- Area code: +421 44
- Vehicle registration plate (until 2022): LM
- Website: www.zavaznaporuba.sk

Závažná Poruba (Hungarian: Németporuba) is a village and municipality in Liptovský Mikuláš District in the Žilina Region of northern Slovakia.

== History ==
In historical records the village was first mentioned in 1263. Before the establishment of independent Czechoslovakia in 1918, it was part of Liptó County within the Kingdom of Hungary. From 1939 to 1945, it was part of the Slovak Republic.

The Slovak poet Milan Rufus was born in the village in 1928.

== Geography ==
The municipality lies at an altitude of 616 metres (2,021 ft) and covers an area of 18.65 km^{2} (7.20 sq mi) (2025).

== Population ==
Population statistic (10 years)
Year	1995	2005	2015	2025
Count	1232	1225	1267	1285
Difference		−0.56%	+3.42%	+1.42%

Population statistic
Year	2024	2025
Count	1295	1285
Difference		−0.77%

It has a population of 1285 people (31 December 2025).

=== Ethnicity ===
Census 2021 (1+ %)
Ethnicity	Number	Fraction
Slovak	1206	96.63%
Not found out	35	2.8%
Czech	15	1.2%
Total	1248	

In year 2021 was 1248 people by ethnicity 1206 as Slovak, 35 as Not found out, 15 as Czech, 3 as Russian, 2 as Rusyn, 2 as Moravian, 2 as Other, 1 as Ukrainian, 1 as Polish, 1 as German, 1 as Hungarian and 1 as English.

Note on population: The difference values of population numbers in the table "Population statistic" and in the sections "Ethnicity" & "Religion" is caused by the use of various statistical methods.

=== Religion ===
Census 2021 (1+ %)
Religion	Number	Fraction
Evangelical Church	530	42.47%
None	445	35.66%
Roman Catholic Church	201	16.11%
Not found out	34	2.72%
Total	1248	

In year 2021 was 1248 people by religion 530 from Evangelical Church, 445 from None, 201 from Roman Catholic Church, 34 from Not found out, 10 from Greek Catholic Church, 8 from Ad hoc movements, 7 from Jehovah's Witnesses, 5 from Other, 3 from Other and not ascertained christian church, 1 from Eastern Orthodox Church, 1 from Christian Congregations in Slovakia, 1 from Islam, 1 from United Methodist Church and 1 from Buddhism.
