= Schopenhauer and the Wild Years of Philosophy =

1987 book by Rüdiger Safranski

- Author: Rüdiger Safranski
- Original title: Schopenhauer und die wilden Jahre der Philosophie
- Translator: Ewald Osers
- Language: German
- Subject: Arthur Schopenhauer
- Genre: biography
- Publisher: Carl Hanser Verlag
- Publication date: 1987
- Publication place: Germany
- English publication date: 1991
- Pages: 556
- ISBN: 9783446144903

Schopenhauer and the Wild Years of Philosophy (German: Schopenhauer und die wilden Jahre der Philosophie. Eine Biographie) is a 1987 book by the German writer Rüdiger Safranski. It is a biography about the philosopher Arthur Schopenhauer.

== Reception ==
In the Journal of the History of Philosophy, James Snow and Dale E. Snow wrote that Safranski manages to portray Schopenhauer's brusque and hostile character, as well as the suffering and insecurities his behaviour concealed. The critics wrote that the book is at its best when it describes scenes from Schopenhauer's life, but is too sweeping when it portrays his intellectual milieu, and commits outright errors by omitting subjects such as the pantheism controversy and the impacts of Baruch Spinoza, Friedrich Heinrich Jacobi and Gottlob Ernst Schulze. Snow and Snow compared the book unfavourably to Arthur Hübscher's Schopenhauer biography Thinker Against the Tide.
