= Schiller oder Die Erfindung des Deutschen Idealismus =

2004 book by Rüdiger Safranski

- Title page for Schiller oder Die Erfindung des Deutschen Idealismus (2004)
- Author: Rüdiger Safranski
- Language: German
- Subject: Friedrich Schiller; German idealism
- Genre: biography
- Publisher: Carl Hanser Verlag
- Publication date: 10 September 2004
- Publication place: Germany
- Pages: 560
- ISBN: 978-3-446-20548-2

Schiller oder Die Erfindung des Deutschen Idealismus (lit. 'Schiller or The Invention of German Idealism') is a 2004 biography about the German writer and philosopher Friedrich Schiller, written by Rüdiger Safranski. It covers Schiller's life and work with his adherence to German idealism at the centre, presenting Schiller as a dynamic and influential figure driven by enthusiasm, friendship, poetry and freedom. The book was written to be out for the 200th anniversary of Schiller's death in 2005.

It was awarded the 2005 Leipzig Book Fair Prize.
