= Milan Rúfus =

Slovak poet and writer (1928–2009)

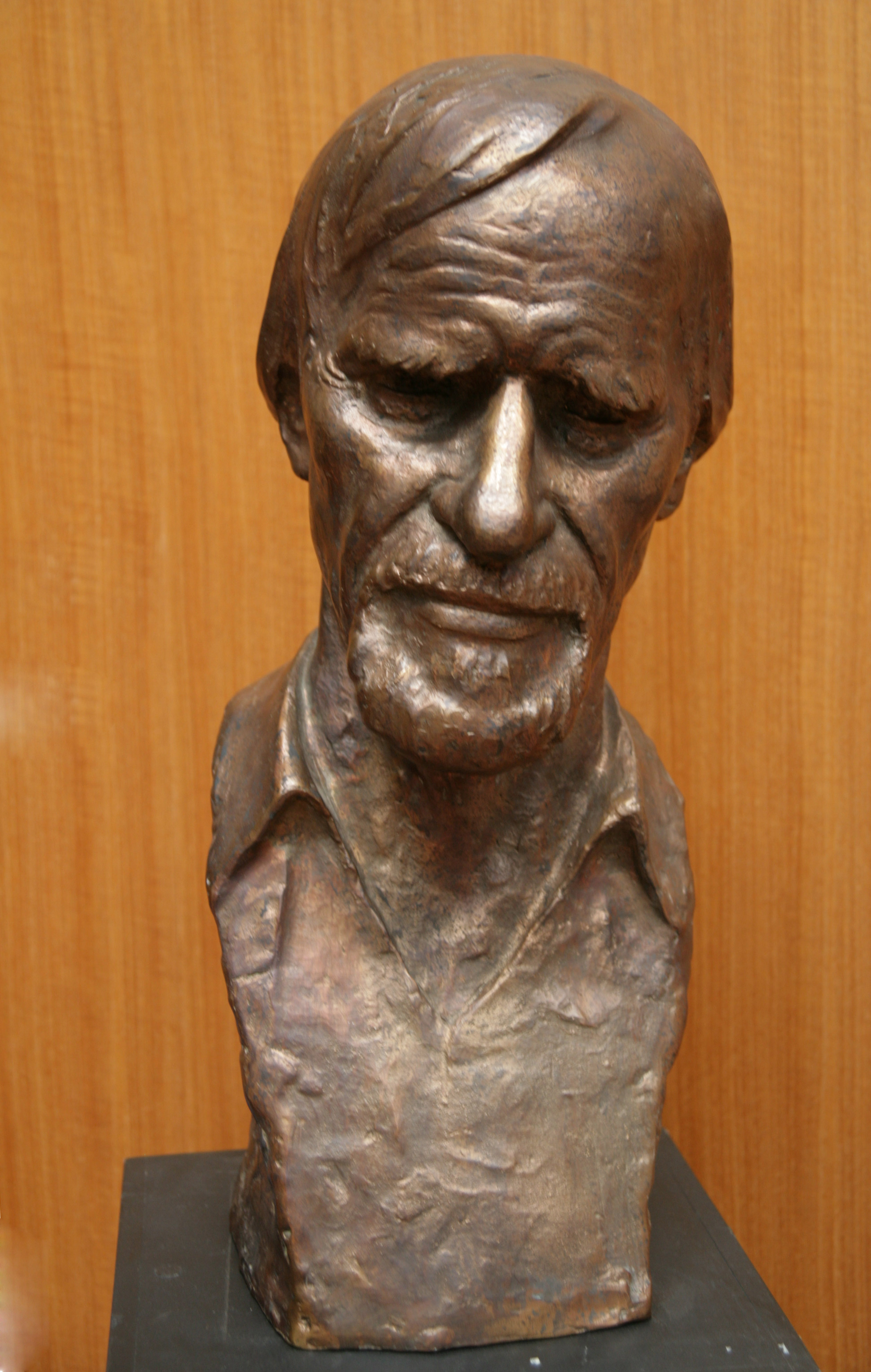
- Born: December 10, 1928; Závažná Poruba, Czechoslovakia (now part of Slovakia)
- Died: January 11, 2009 (aged 80); Bratislava, Slovakia
- Education: Comenius University in Bratislava
- Occupations: poet, translator
- Spouse: Magda (née Podhorňáková)
- Writing career
- Language: Slovak

Milan Rúfus (December 10, 1928 – January 11, 2009) was a Slovak poet, essayist, translator, children's writer and academic. Rúfus is the most translated Slovak poet into other languages.

== Life ==
Milan Rúfus was born to a family of bricklayers in Závažná Poruba. Rúfus was a cradle Lutheran. Aged 32, in 1960, he married Magda née Podhorňáková from Žilina (1934 – 2026), later doctor of philosophy, ethnographer, foreign broadcast editor in Slovenská televízia, who was of Catholic faith, and their only child Zuzana was born in 1961 (died 2023) in Liptovský Mikuláš the following year. Zuzana, who was born prematurely and with severe mental disability, had often been named Rúfus' "greatest muse".

After graduating from a local grammar school in the town of Liptovský Mikuláš in 1948, he studied the Slovak language, literature, and history in the Faculty of Arts at Comenius University in Bratislava. From 1952 until his retirement in 1989, he lectured at the University on the history of Slovak and Czech literature. From 1971 to 1972 he also taught Slovak language and literature at the University of Naples, Italy. He retired in 1990 and lived with his family in Bratislava. On 11 January 2009, Rúfus died a month after his 80th birthday, at the University Hospital in that city.

== Work ==
Rúfus published his first poems in the magazines Prameň (Stream), Nový rod (New lineage), Mladá tvorba (Production of young ones) and Borba in the 1940s. His first collection, Až dozrieme ("When We Grow Mature") debuted in 1956. Až dozrieme was a huge progression in understanding of poetry in that period. His work was influenced by symbolism, while he also exhibited strong social feelings. His sources of inspiration included Slovak folk art, the compositions of various Slovak painters, and also the work of photographer Martin Martinček.

His poetry is known for the way he incorporated moral and life values, love, truth, beauty, suffering and the tragedy of both humans and the world during the second half of the 20th century. His works reflect his search for the meaning and essence of life, showing both perception and sensibility. In his poems, he delved into life's sorrows, uncertainties, delights, happiness and also resistance. He is credited with reminding the Slovak people to hold onto their traditions during the Communist era.

In a book of essays, Človek, čas a tvorba ("Human, Time and Creation"), he examined questions of poetry and its relation to truth, homeland and time. Toward the end of his life he also published Báseň a čas ("Poem and Time") and Vernosť ("Fidelity").

Beside writing for adults, he is known for his children's literature. A children's book, Modlitbičky ("Little Prayers") has been called his most successful work.

As a translator he produced a Slovak version of Henrik Ibsen's Peer Gynt.

== Awards and recognition ==
Rúfus, whose works have been translated into more than 20 languages, had been nominated for the Nobel Prize for Literature multiple times beginning in 1991. He became the first winner of the international Crane Summit Award for poetry 2008, introduced in Bratislava on his birthday, 10 December 2008. As part of the award, his poems have been translated into Chinese.

In 1998, a minor planet 33158 Rúfus was named after him. On December 10, 2013, a Google Doodle celebrated his life and work.
