= Miroslav Válek =

Slovak writer, author

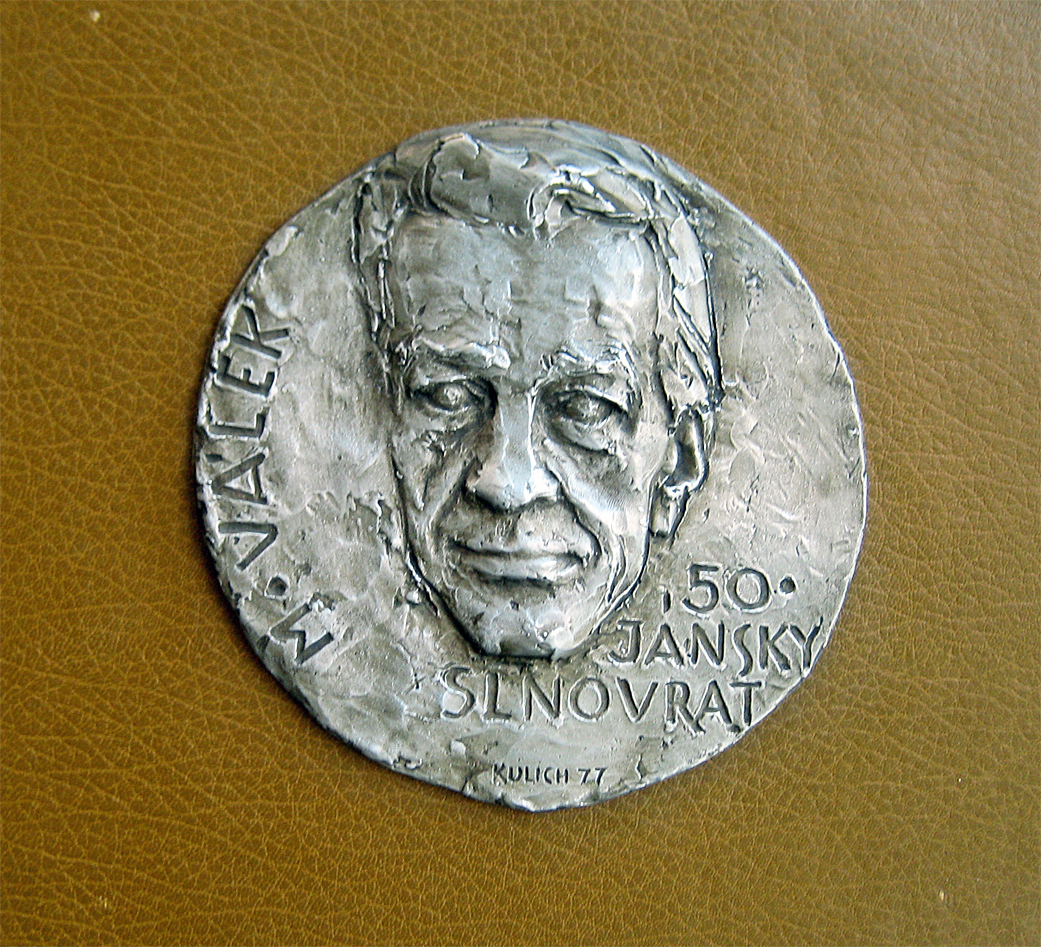
- Born: 17 July 1927; Trnava, Czechoslovakia
- Died: 27 January 1991 (aged 63); Bratislava, Czechoslovakia
- Occupations: Writer, politician

Miroslav Válek (July 17, 1927 – January 27, 1991) was a Slovak poet, publicist and politician.

== Biography ==
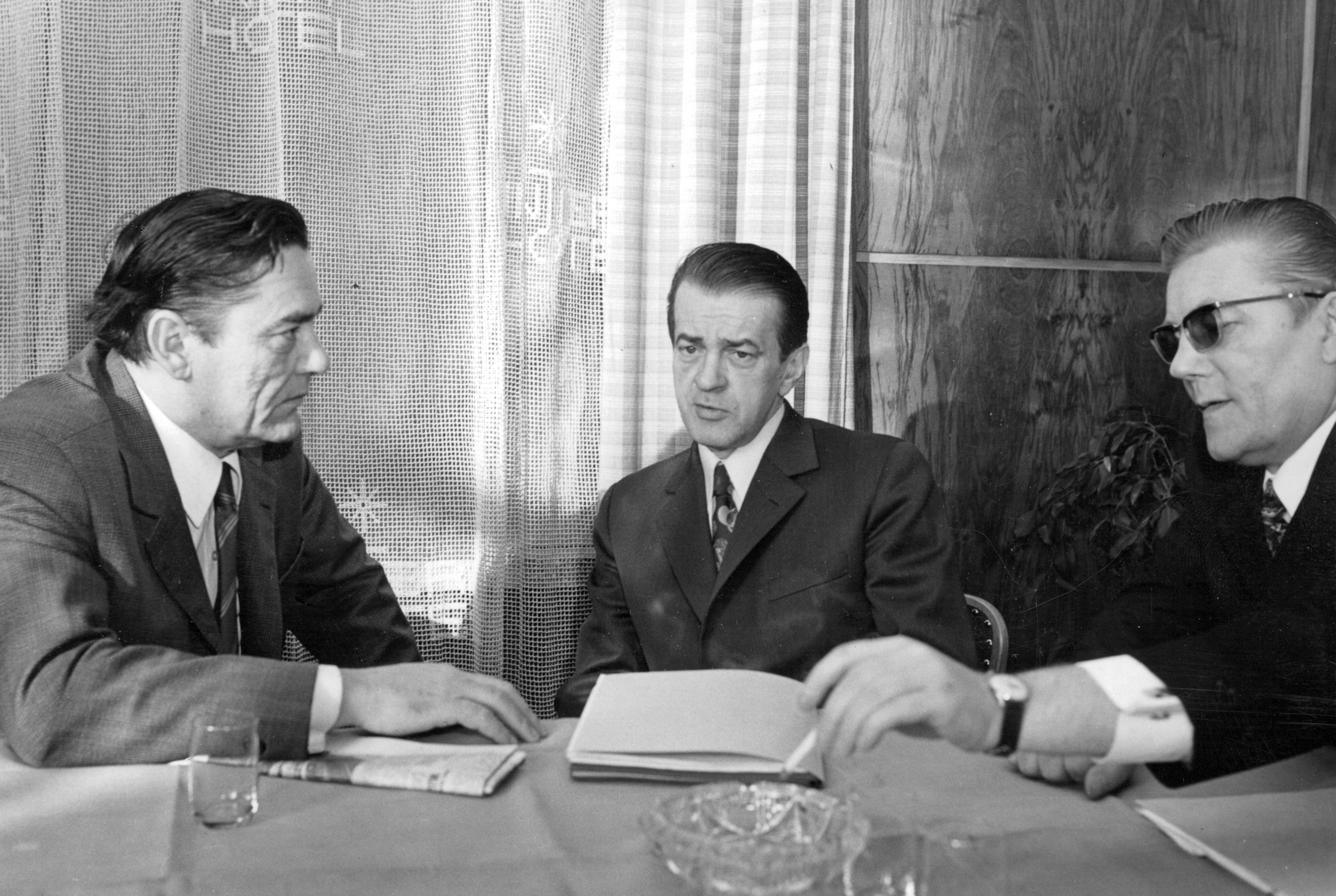
Miroslav Válek (in the middle) talking with functionaries of Matica Slovenská

Miroslav Válek was born in Trnava and from 1947 to 1949 he studied at Vysoká škola obchodná in Bratislava. During the years 1949–1963 he worked as an editor for magazines (Slovenský roľník, Týždeň, Družstevný obzor), finally becoming general editor of Mladá tvorba.

In 1962 he joined the Communist party of Czechoslovakia. In the years 1966–1967 he was general editor of the magazine Romboid and also the secretary of Zväz slovenských spisovateľov, later (1967–1968) serving as its president.

Válek was politically active and became high ranking party official. As a result of Constitutional Act on the Czechoslovak Federation, the Ministry of Culture of Slovakia was established in 1969, with Miroslav Válek as its minister, position he held until 1988. In 1971 he became a member of party central committee, position he retained until 1986.

When the Candle demonstration in Bratislava was broken up by the authorities on March 25, 1988, Válek was among the party officials overseeing the crackdown, and later reported on it at a party meeting.

He died in Bratislava.

== Writing career ==
Miroslav Válek established himself with modernist poetic expression. Through the devices of avant-garde poetics he analysed the situation of modern man and was sceptical of his activity where he intervened in the way the world went.

=== Books of poetry ===
- 1959 – Dotyky (Touches)
- 1961 – Príťažlivosť (Attraction)
- 1963 – Nepokoj (Unrest)
- 1965 – Milovanie v husej koži (Lovemaking in Goose Skin)
- 1973 – Súvislosti (Contexts)
- 1976 – Slovo (Word)
- 1977 – Z vody (From Water)
- 1977 – Zakázaná láska (Forbidden Love)
- 1983 – Básne (Verses) (collected edition)

=== English translations ===
- 1996 – Ground Beneath Our Feet
- 2015 – Collection of Poems: Miroslav Válek

== Legacy ==
Regarded as acclaimed Slovak language poet, Miroslav Válek remains highly controversial figure due his political activities.

Some of Válek's poetry pieces were set on music, most notably Jesenná láska (The Autumn Love) recorded by Miroslav Žbirka and Smutná ranná električka (Sad Morning Tram) recorded by Pavol Hammel and Marián Varga.
