= Adele Schopenhauer =

German author (1797–1849)

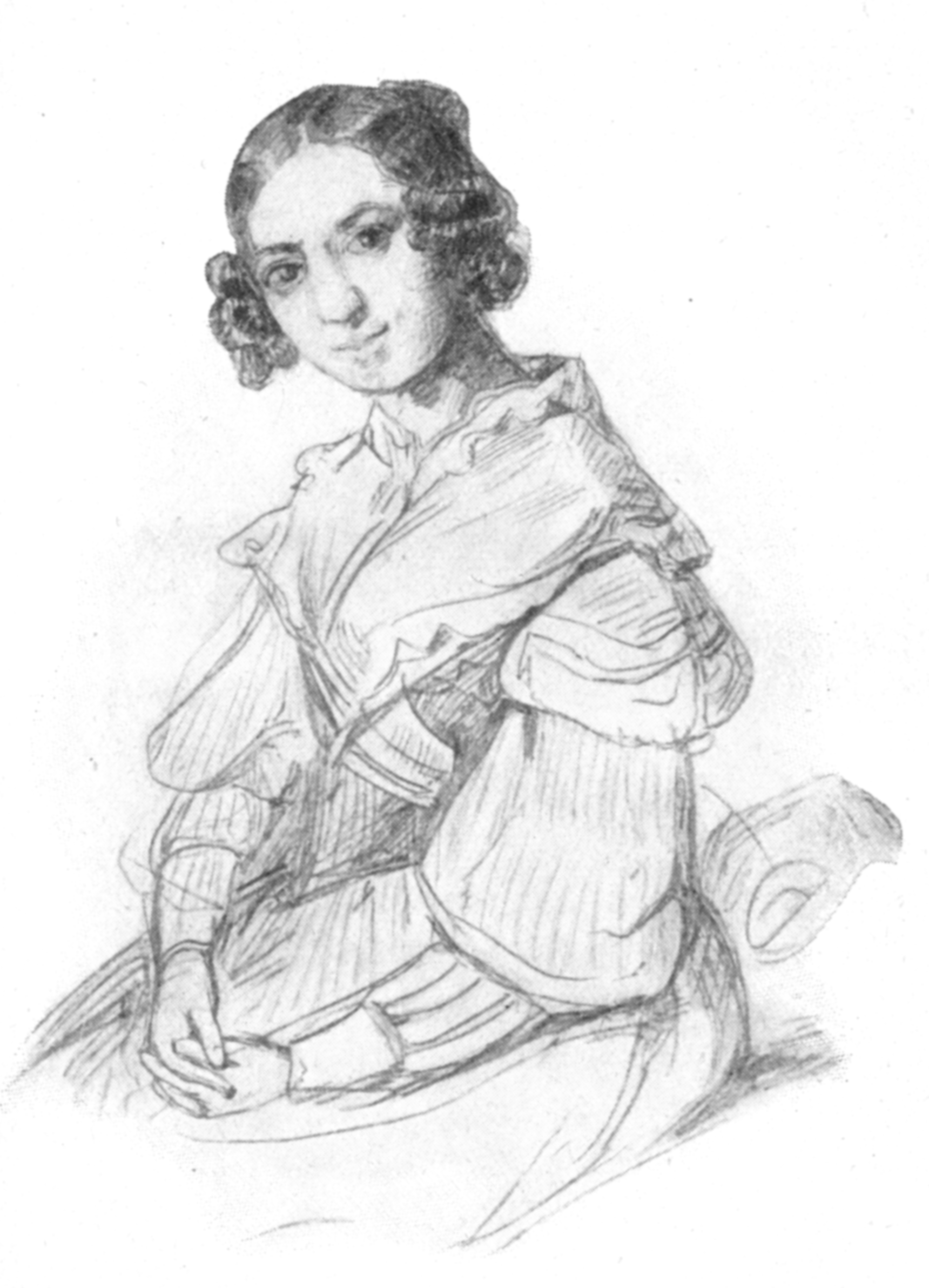
- Adele Schopenhauer in 1841; Portrait by Alexander von Sternberg
- Born: Luise Adelaide Lavinia Schopenhauer; 12 June 1797; Hamburg, Holy Roman Empire
- Died: 25 August 1849 (aged 52); Bonn, German Confederation
- Resting place: Bonn, Germany
- Occupations: Author; papercut artist
- Parent: Johanna Schopenhauer (mother)
- Relatives: Arthur Schopenhauer (brother)
- Writing career
- Pen name: Henriette Sommer; Adrian van der Venne
- Language: German

Luise Adelaide Lavinia Schopenhauer, known as Adele Schopenhauer (12 June 1797 – 25 August 1849), was a German author. She was the sister of the philosopher Arthur Schopenhauer and daughter of author Johanna Schopenhauer. Henriette Sommer and Adrian van der Venne were pseudonyms used by her.

== Life and work ==
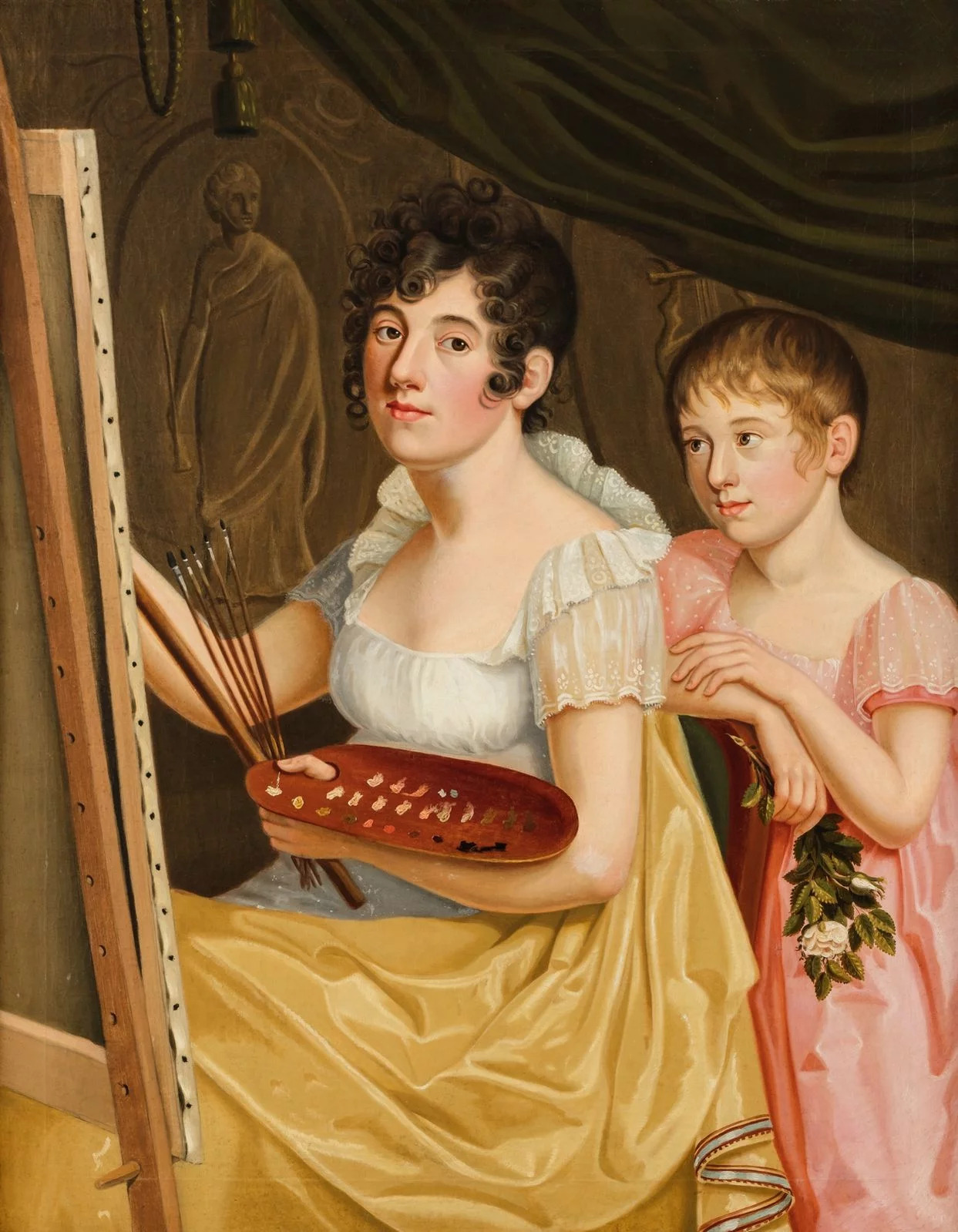
Johanna and Adele Schopenhauer (as a child), 1806. Painting by Caroline Bardua.

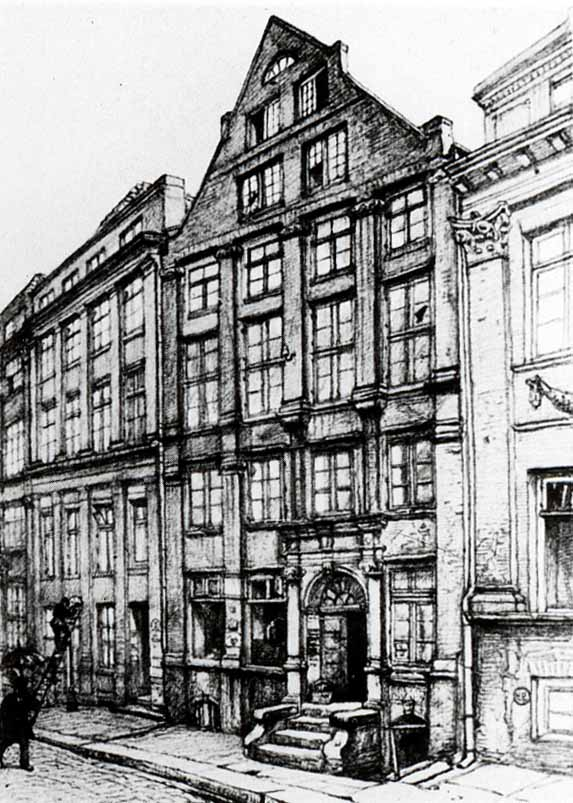
Residence and business office of the Schopenhauer family until 1805, located at New Wandrahm 92, Hamburg (since demolished, today Speicherstadt)

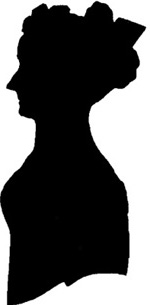
Papercut self-portrait

Adele Schopenhauer was born in Hamburg to Heinrich Floris Schopenhauer, a businessman, and his wife Johanna. She grew up in Weimar under the influence of a circle of artists and scholars who gathered in the literary salon run by her mother, but she received no formal education. She was highly gifted and engaged in literature and poetry. She not only wrote fairy tales, poems, and novels, but was also a talented papercut artist. Both her papercuts and her literary contributions have been recognized and appreciated, especially in the English-speaking world. She was sociable and likable, but her love interests were unrequited, and she never married.

== Loss of assets in 1819 ==
In May 1819, the Danzig banking house Muhl collapsed. Johanna and Adele Schopenhauer had deposited all the money they had inherited upon Heinrich Schopenhauer's death in 1805 in that bank, and thus lost a large part of their assets when the bank collapsed. Arthur Schopenhauer had wisely left only one-third of his assets in Muhl and was not willing to engage in a settlement with Muhl. This incident led to a further deterioration of the relationship between the two women and Arthur, because they repeatedly sent him letters, in vain, asking him to approve the settlement. The further development of the lawsuit proved Arthur right. Mother and daughter settled on an agreement with a 70% loss and lost most of their wealth. Arthur, however, waited and refused to cash in his promissory notes. Muhl, who was considered a shrewd tactician, tried till the end to get Arthur to agree to a settlement with the generous offer of a 70% asset return plus a flock of sheep. But when Muhl recovered financially and again became solvent, Arthur was able to get his entire money back some years later.

A close friend of Goethe's daughter-in-law Ottilie (de), Adele Schopenhauer often visited Goethe's house in Weimar. She was known to have called Goethe "father", and he praised her abilities.

This loss of wealth was not without drastic consequences. Although Johanna could make some earnings through her writing career and Adele retained some residual assets because she was protected in part by her immaturity, the lifestyle of the Schopenhauer women in the 1820s was very different from that of earlier years. This is also apparent from a letter Adele wrote 17 years after the loss, in which she speaks of "false prosperity".

== Move to Bonn ==
Due to the change of circumstances in Weimar and their unfavorable financial situation, the standing of the Schopenhauers in Weimar apparently dropped. Adele was able, in 1828, to persuade her mother Johanna to move to Bonn. They could not initially afford to live year-round in Bonn, so they temporarily moved to Unkel, a cheaper city. In Bonn, Adele was a close friend of Annette von Droste-Hülshoff and of Sibylle Mertens-Schaaffhausen.

After her mother's death in 1838, Schopenhauer travelled a lot, mostly to Italy, until she finally returned to Bonn, seriously ill, where she died in 1849 and was buried on Goethe's 100th birthday. Her friend Sibylle Mertens-Schaaffhausen made a touching epitaph in Italian. Four days after Schopenhauer's funeral, Mertens-Schaaffhausen held a private memorial service, following a pattern from classical antiquity, in her garden on Wilhelmstraße. Adele Schopenhauer's grave is located in the old cemetery in Bonn.

== Literary works ==
- Anna. Ein Roman aus der nächsten Vergangenheit [Anna: A novel from the most recent past]. Parts 1–2. Leipzig: Brockhaus, 1845.
- Eine dänische Geschichte [A Danish story], Braunschweig: Westermann, 1848.
- Gedichte und Scherenschnitte [Poems and silhouettes]. 2 volumes. Edited by H. H. Houben and Hans Wahl. Leipzig: Klinkhardt, 1920.
  - Volume 1: Poetry
  - Volume 2: Papercuts
- Haus-, Wald- und Feenmärchen [Fairy tales of the home, the forest, and of fairies]. Leipzig: Brockhaus, 1844.
- Tagebuch einer Einsamen [Diary of a lonely one]. Edited, and with an introduction, by H. H. Houben. With silhouettes of the author and an appendix by Rahel E. Feilchenfeldt-Steiner; Munich: Matthes & Seits Verlag, 1985.
- Florenz. Ein Reiseführer mit Anekdoten und Erzählungen [Florence: A guide with anecdotes and stories]; 1847/48. Edited by Waltraud Maierhofer. Weimar: VDG, 2007.
- Vom-Niederrhein [From the lower Rhine]. Edited by Ulrich Bornemann. Calendar for the Kleverland for the year 2009. Kleve 2008, pages 99–117. ISBN 978-3-89413-009-1

== Papercut art ==
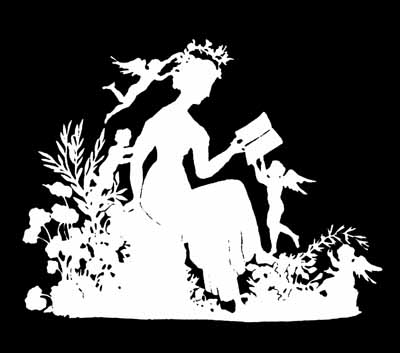

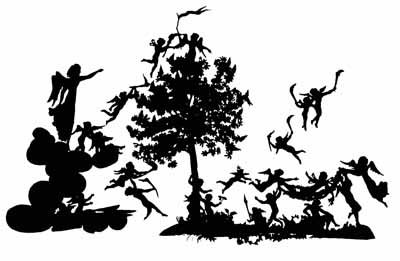

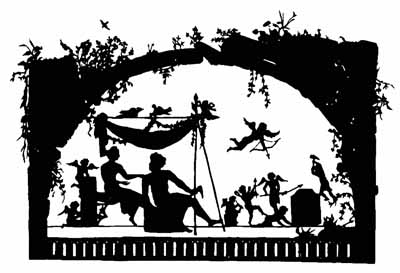

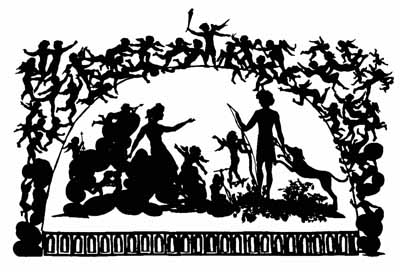

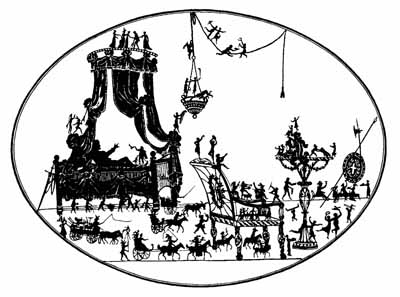

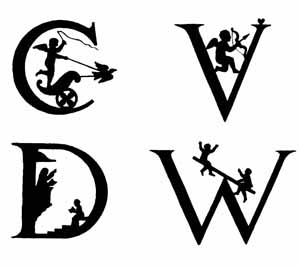
