= Stefan Klein =

German physicist, author and essayist (born 1965)

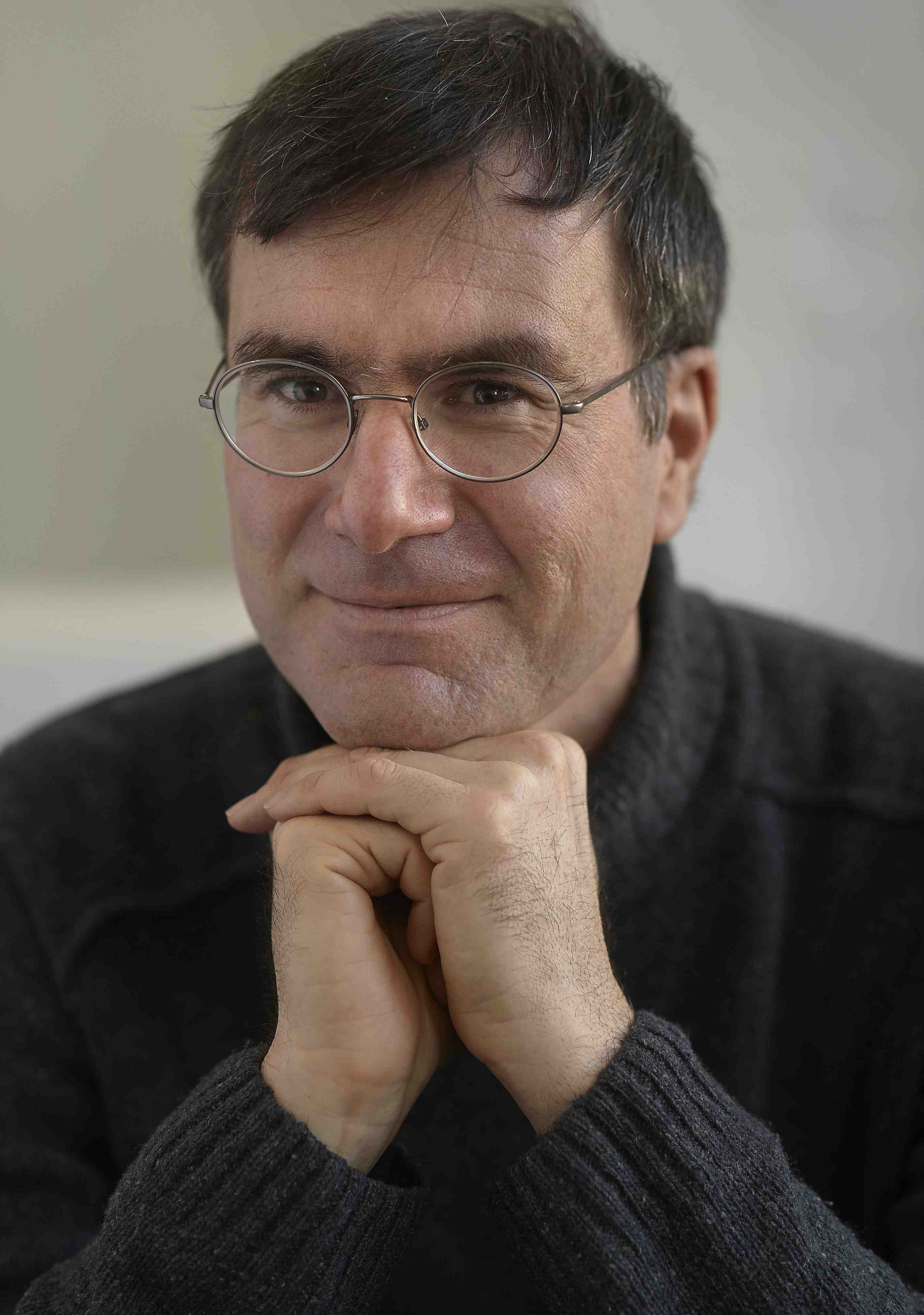
- Born: October 5, 1965; Munich, Germany
- Citizenship: Austrian
- Education: Physics, Ph. D.
- Alma mater: LMU Munich
- Occupations: Writer, Professor
- Website: www.stefanklein.info

Stefan Klein (born October 5, 1965, Munich) is a physicist, author, essayist and visiting professor at Berlin University of the Arts. He is best known for his books The Science of Happiness and Time: A User's Guide. His works have been translated into 25 languages and became bestsellers in many countries.

== Life and work ==
Klein was born in Munich, Germany. Both his parents were chemists and had emigrated from Austria; their ancestors had been scientists for three generations. Klein studied physics and analytical philosophy at LMU Munich and Grenoble Alpes University and graduated in theoretical biophysics at the University of Freiburg, Germany. He left his academic career to become science editor at Der Spiegel, a newsmagazine, in 1996, and quickly made a name for himself through a series of ten highly regarded cover stories. He was awarded the Georg von Holtzbrinck Preis, a prestigious German prize for science writing in 1998. After a stint at Geo, a popular scientific magazine, he has worked as a freelance author since 2000.

His 2002 book The Science of Happiness is a synthesis of findings from neuroscience, social psychology and philosophy on how positive emotions can arise in the human brain. Klein explains Happiness as an automatic signal the brain uses to mark situations promising a benefit for the organism. As it is triggered when a given situation appears better relative to a previous state, no external conditions whatever can account for lasting happiness. However, Klein believes subjective well-being can be raised by training the awareness for positive emotions when they are generated in the brain. . Alison Abbott from Nature Magazine called The Science of Happiness "an extremely well-written, easy-to-read and expertly researched book on a theme which has long been begging for pop-science treatment". It was on the German bestseller list for more than a year.

In The Secret Pulse of Time (2006), Klein explored the human capacity to perceive time. It describes most people's constant difficulties in dealing efficiently with time as a consequence of the brain's organisation: Awareness for time and the ability to follow one's plans are functions of highly evolved and vulnerable cognitive mechanisms. Frankfurter Allgemeine Zeitung, a German national newspaper, characterized this book as 'a protest against the deeply unfair fact that memorable time flies by whereas unbearable time stumbles'. Library Journal elected its English translation as one of the best science books in 2007 .

Klein has advocated for novel ways to communicate science. In his view, science should rather be told as stories rather than by teaching facts. He also opposed the unique use of English as a language of science and argued that it would be better to teach science in national languages, at least at an undergraduate level.

His essays were published by leading German newspapers and by various English-language media such as the New York Times and Nature.

Klein lives in Berlin. He is married and has two daughters and one son.

== Bibliography ==
=== English ===
- The Science of Happiness, Marlowe 2006, ISBN 1-56924-328-X
- The Secret Pulse of Time, Marlowe 2007, ISBN 1-60094-017-X
  - Published in Paperback as Time: A User's Guide, Penguin 2008, ISBN 0-14103-463-7
- Leonardo's Legacy: How Da Vinci Reimagined the World, Da Capo Press 2010, 0-30681-825-6
- Survival of the Nicest, The Experiment 2014, ISBN 1-61519-090-2
- We Are All Stardust: Scientists Who Shaped Our World Talk about Their Work, Their Lives, and What They Still Want to Know, The Experiment, 2015, ISBN 1-61519-059-7

=== German ===
- Die Tagebücher der Schöpfung, dtv: Munich 2000 ISBN 3-423-34154-8
- Die Glücksformel, Rowohlt: Reinbek 2002 ISBN 3-498-03509-6
- Alles Zufall, Rowohlt: Reinbek 2004 ISBN 3-498-03519-3
- Zeit, S.Fischer: Frankfurt 2006 ISBN 3-10-039610-3
- Da Vincis Vermächtnis oder Wie Leonardo die Welt neu erfand, Frankfurt 2008, ISBN 978-3-10-039612-9
- Der Sinn des Gebens, S. Fischer Frankfurt 2010. ISBN 3-10-039614-6
- Wir alle sind Sternenstaub, S. Fischer: Frankfurt 2010. ISBN 3-596-18070-8
- Wir könnten unsterblich sein, S. Fischer: Frankfurt 2014. ISBN 3-596-19606-X
- Träume, S. Fischer: Frankfurt 2014, ISBN 3-10-039615-4
