= Rüdiger Safranski =

German philosopher

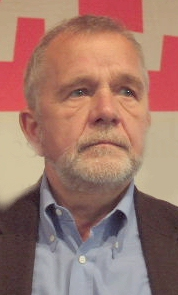
- Safranski in 2007
- Born: 1 January 1945 (age 81); Rottweil, Württemberg, Germany (today Baden-Württemberg, Germany)
- Occupations: Philosopher; Author
- Writing career
- Notable awards: Leipzig Book Fair Prize; 2005

Rüdiger Safranski (born 1 January 1945) is a German philosopher and author.

== Life ==
From 1965 to 1972, Safranski studied philosophy (among others, with Theodor W. Adorno), German literature, history and history of art at Goethe University in Frankfurt am Main and as well at the Free University in Berlin (then West Berlin). There, he worked as an assistant lecturer for German literature from 1972 to 1977. He earned a PhD from FU Berlin in 1976 for a dissertation by the title of "Studies on the Development of Working-Class Literature in the Federal Republic of Germany" (original German: Studien zur Entwicklung der Arbeiterliteratur in der Bundesrepublik). In the late 1970s, he worked as the co-publisher and editor of the Berliner Hefte, a journal on literary life. From 1977 to 1982, Safranski worked as a lecturer in adult education. Since 1987 he has worked as a freelance writer.

In 2005 he married his longtime girlfriend Gisela Nicklaus. He lives in Berlin and Badenweiler.

== Works and TV appearances ==
Safranski's most popular works are monographs on Friedrich Schiller, E.T.A. Hoffmann, Arthur Schopenhauer, Friedrich Nietzsche, Martin Heidegger, and Johann Wolfgang Goethe.

Since 1994, he is a member of the P.E.N. Center, since 2001 member of the Deutsche Akademie für Sprache und Dichtung (German Academy for Language and Poetry) in Darmstadt.

He co-directed Der Zauberer von Meßkirch, a 1989 television documentary about Heidegger. From 2002 to 2012, he and Peter Sloterdijk co-hosted a bi-monthly debate on philosophical and ethical questions, Das Philosophische Quartett (lit. 'The Philosophical Quartet'), for German public-service TV station ZDF.

=== Selected works ===
- Einzeln sein. Eine philosophische Herausforderung.Munich, Hanser. 2021. ISBN 978-3-446-25671-2
- Goethe. Kunstwerk des Lebens. Goethe: Life as a Work of Art. München ua, Hanser. Munich, Hanser. 2013. ISBN 978-3446235816
- Goethe and Schiller. Geschichte einer Freundschaft. Story of a friendship. München ua, Hanser. Munich, Hanser. 2009. ISBN 978-3-446-23326-3
- Romantik. Eine deutsche Affäre. Romanticism. A German affair. München ua, Hanser. Munich, Hanser. 2007. ISBN 978-3-446-20944-2 [Review of the English translation by Omid Mehrgan in Modern Language Notes, April 2015; see also: Hans-Dieter Gelfert in The Berlin Review of Books, 30 November 2009]
- Schiller als Philosoph – Eine Anthologie. Schiller as Philosopher – An Anthology. Berlin, wjs-Verlag. Berlin, wjs-Verlag. 2005. ISBN 3-937989-08-0
- Schiller oder Die Erfindung des Deutschen Idealismus. Schiller, or the invention of German idealism. München ua, Hanser. Munich, Hanser. 2004. ISBN 3-446-20548-9 [Rezension: Manfred Koch in NZZ, 25.; see also: Manfred Koch in the NZZ, 25 September 2004]
- Wieviel Globalisierung verträgt der Mensch? How much globalization can a human being tolerate? München ua: Hanser. Munich: Hanser. 2003. ISBN 3-446-20261-7
- Nietzsche. Biographie seines Denkens. [Nietzsche: Biography of his thinking]. München ua, Hanser. Munich, Hanser. 2000. ISBN 3-446-19938-1 [Rezension: Ijoma Mangold in Berliner Zeitung, 18.; see also: Ijoma Mangold in Berliner Zeitung, 18 August 2000]
- Das Böse oder Das Drama der Freiheit. Evil or the drama of freedom. München ua, Hanser. Munich, Hanser. 1997. ISBN 3-446-18767-7 [Rezension: Micha Brumlik in Die Zeit, 19.; see also: Micha Brumlik in Die Zeit, 19 September 1997]
- Ein Meister aus Deutschland. Heidegger und seine Zeit. A master from Germany. Heidegger and his time. München ua, Hanser. Munich, Hanser. 1994. ISBN 3-446-17874-0
- Wieviel Wahrheit braucht der Mensch? How much truth do we need? Über das Denkbare und das Lebbare. About the thinkable and liveable. München ua, Hanser. Munich, Hanser. 1990. ISBN 3-446-16045-0
- Schopenhauer und die wilden Jahre der Philosophie. Schopenhauer and the wild years of philosophy. Eine Biographie. A biography. 2. 2. Aufl. München ua: Hanser. Munich et al. ed: Hanser. 1988. ISBN 3-446-14490-0
- E.T.A. Hoffmann. Das Leben eines skeptischen Phantasten. The life of a skeptical dreamer. München ua: Hanser. Munich: Hanser. 1984. ISBN 3-446-13822-6
- Studien zur Entwicklung der Arbeiterliteratur in der Bundesrepublik (Dissertation), Berlin, Freie Univ., 1976. Studies on the development of working-class literature in the Federal Republic (dissertation), Berlin, Freie Univ., 1976.

== Awards ==
- 1995 Friedrich Märker Prize for Essayists
- 1996 Wilhelm Heinse Medal of the Mainz Academy of Sciences and Literature
- 1998 Ernst Robert Curtius Prize for Essay Writing
- 2000 Friedrich Nietzsche Prize of the State of Saxony-Anhalt
- 2003 Premio Internazionale Federico Nietzsche, the Italian Nietzsche Society
- 2005 Leipzig Book Fair Prize in the category Non-Fiction/Essays for "Schiller, or The Invention of German Idealism"
- 2006 Friedrich-Hölderlin-Preis of the City of Bad Homburg
- 2006 Welt-Literaturpreis
- 2009 Corine Literature Prize, Lifetime Achievement prize from the Bavarian Minister President
- 2014 Thomas Mann Prize
