= Carl Hanser Verlag =

German publishing house

- Founded: 1928
- Founder: Carl Hanser
- Country of origin: Germany
- Headquarters location: Munich
- Key people: Wolfgang Beisler, Jo Lendle, Stephan D. Joß
- Publication types: Books, journals
- No. of employees: 200
- Official website: www.hanser.de

Carl Hanser Verlag is a German publishing company headquartered in Munich. Founded in 1928 by Carl Hanser, it is one of the few medium-sized publishing companies in the German-speaking area still owned by the founding family.

== History ==
From its inception, the publishing house was active in the fields of fiction and literature, with fiction being published from 1933 to 1946.

A foundational turning point of the company was the incorporation of the magazine Betriebsstechnik in 1933. Forays into the field of trade journals, with 21 publications, played an important role in addition to literature and specialist books.

The founder, Carl Hanser, withdrew from active publishing management in 1976, and died in 1985. Wolfgang Beisler, a grandson of Carl Hanser, became a member of the management in 1996. Michael Krüger was Managing Director of Carl Hanser Verlag until 2013, when Jo Lendle took over.

In 1961, Carl Hanser Verlag was one of eleven founding members of the Dtv Verlagsgesellschaft. By 1954, it was one of the founders of the book series Die Bücher der Neunzehn (The Books of the Nineteen). In 1993, the joint venture Hanser Gardner Publications was founded in Cincinnati. That same year, Carl Hanser Verlag extended its activities to include children's literature.

In 1995, Carl Hanser Verlag took over the publishing houses of Fachbuchverlag Leipzig and Sanssouci Verlag. Since 1999, its children's and youth books have been published under the name Reihe Hanser and also as paperback at dtv. In the field of audiobooks, Carl Hanser Verlag co-founded the start-up of DHV - Der Hörverlag.

== Current situation ==
Today, the publisher is one of the few publishers in Germany that does not belong to a large corporation. At the Munich and Leipzig locations, approximately 200 employees are employed and generate sales amounting to approximately €50 million.

Its subsidiaries are Paul Zsolnay Verlag in Wien (acquired in 1996), Deuticke Verlag (acquired in 2004), Nagel & Kimche Verlag in Zürich (acquired in 1999), as well as Sanssouci Verlag and Hanser Publications in Cincinnati. Participation also exists at DHV and dtv. Also included in the Hanser-Group since November 2010 is Henrich Publications, headquartered in Gilching near Munich, which is a publishing house for technical journals with readers mainly in manufacturing industry, mechanical engineering, metalworking, electrical trade, in-house logistics and the energy industry.

In 2011 the subsidiary Hanser Berlin was founded, which started with an autumn program in 2012. The initial managing director was editor Elisabeth Ruge. In 2013, she stepped away from the Hanser publishing house, with her role as management position at Hanser Berlin going to Karsten Kredel.

According to the Cicero magazines publishing questionnaire, Hanser is currently the most important publisher of German-language literature, with authors such as Herta Müller, Martin Mosebach, Reinhard Jirgl and David Grossman. In the area of children and youth books, Hanser has consistently secured the rights of important authors. Among other authors who write at Hanser are David Almond, John Green, Finn-Ole Heinrich, Janne Teller, Peter Pohl and Rafik Schami. The publisher's work was awarded the Virenschleuder-Preis at the Frankfurt Book Fair in 2012.

Hanser Fachbuch publishes trade and specialized books from the fields of computer, technology, economy and knowledge. With its computer books, the publisher covers the areas of programming, software development, IT and project management as well as online marketing. On HanserUpdate, the authors of the computer books news and trades section blog about IT topics.
