= Neaera (mythology) =

Greek mythological figures with same name

Neaera (/niˈɪərə/; Ancient Greek: Νέαιρα), also Neaira (/niˈaɪrə/), is the name of multiple female characters in Greek mythology:

- Neaera, one of the 3,000 Oceanids, water-nymph daughters of the Titans Oceanus and his sister-wife Tethys.
- Neaera or Neera, a Nereid and possible mother of Absyrtus by King Aeetes of Colchis.
- Neaera, a lover of Xanthus (Scamander).
- Neaera, a nymph who became the mother of Aegle by Zeus.
- Neaera, a nymph of Thrinacia, mother of Lampetia and Phaethusa by Helios.
- Neaera, a nymph of Mount Sipylus in Lydia, mother of Dresaeus by Theiodamas.
- Neaera, mother of Evadne by Strymon.
- Neaera, a daughter of Pereus, mother of Auge, Cepheus, and Lycurgus by Aleus. In another version, she married Autolycus.
- Neaera, a daughter of Autolycus, mother of Hippothous, eventually killed herself after hearing of the death of her son.
- Neaera, one of the Niobids.
- Neaera of Lemnos, a friend of Eurynome in whose guise Pheme came to warn Eurynome of her husband's infidelity.
- Neaera, possibly the mother of Triptolemus by Celeus.
