= Phaethusa =

Daughter of Helios in Greek mythology

- Shepherdess of Helios' Sacred Sheep
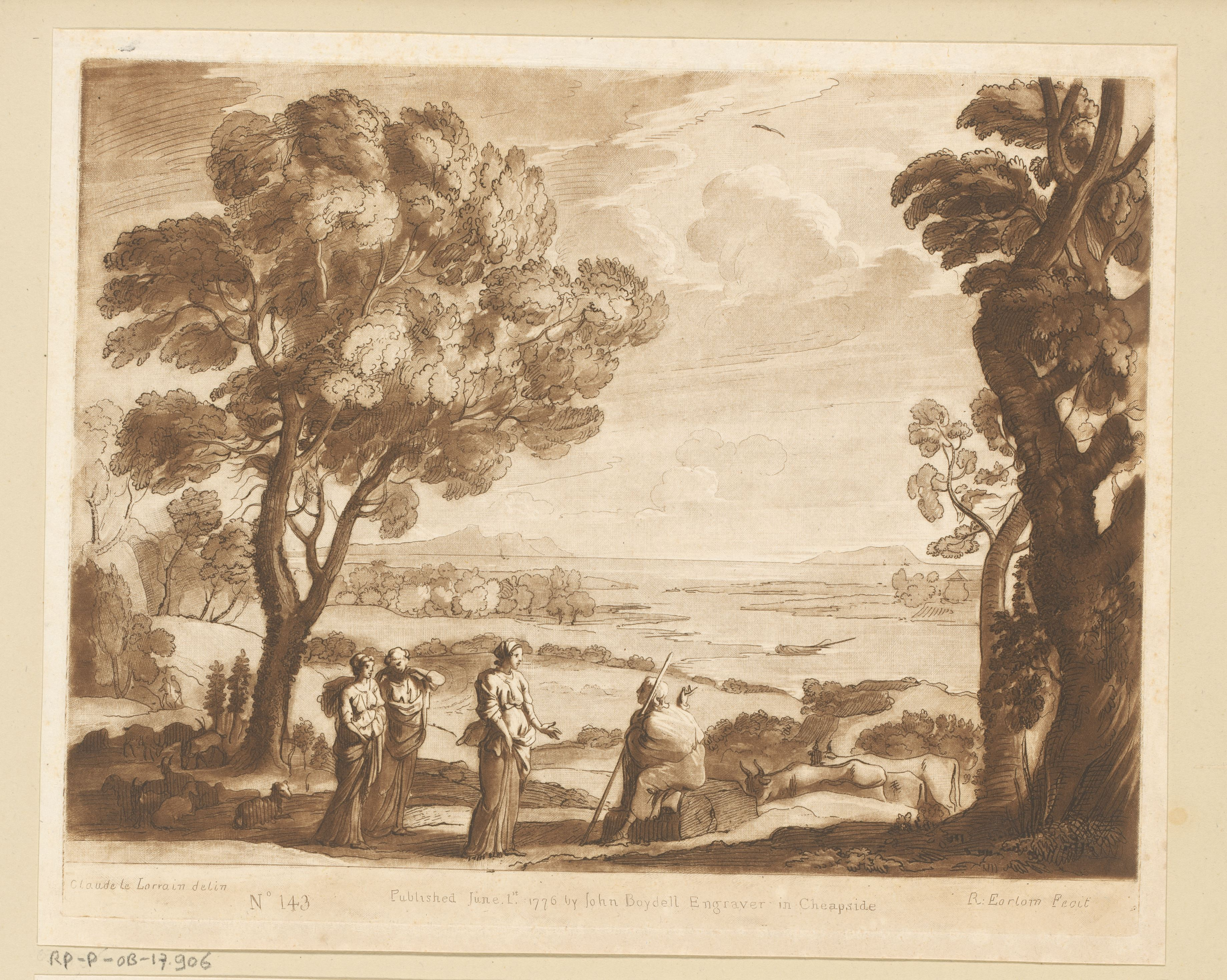
- Phaethusa and Lampetia search for their brother Phaethon. Print by Richard Earlom after a painting by Claude Lorrain (1776)
- Abode: Thrinacia (Sicily)

Genealogy
- Parents: Helios (father); Neaera or Clymene (mother)
- Siblings: Lampetia, Merope, Helie, Aegle, Phoebe, Aetherie, and Dioxippe

In Greek mythology, Phaethusa or Phaëthusa /ˌfeɪəˈθjuːzə/ (Ancient Greek: Φαέθουσα Phaéthousa, "radiance") was a daughter of the sun god Helios. She and her sister Lampetia watched over their father's sacred herds of cattle and sheep on the island of Thrinacia (Sicily or Malta). Phaethusa wielded a silver crook and herded the sheep.

== Family ==
Phaethusa is most commonly described as a daughter of Helios and Neaera, a minor goddess or nymph. As a daughter of Neaera, she would have had one older biological sister, Lampetia, and many half-siblings through her father.

Alternately, Phaethusa has been named as one of the Heliades. This would have made her the daughter of Helios and Clymene, one of the Oceanids. As one of the Heliades, she would have had up to seven biological sisters: Merope, Helie, Aegle, Phoebe, Aetherie, Lampetia, and Dioxippe. However, authors have named different combinations and numbers of Heliades. She would have also had a brother, Phaethon, who was killed by Zeus after attempting and failing to drive Helios' chariot. Phaethusa and Lampetia still attended to their father's flocks in these versions.

== Mythology ==
As young children, Phaethusa and her sister Lampetia were sent to Thrinacia (identified as Sicily or Malta) by Neaera to guard their father's prized herds of cattle and sheep. The animals were beautiful, with white coats and golden horns, and did not age or breed. In Homer's Odyssey, Odysseus and his men land on Thrinacia. A storm created by Zeus prevented the crew from leaving the island, and the men eventually ran out of supplies. While Odysseus was away praying, his men decided to kill and eat some of the sacred cattle; Phaethusa and Lampetia ran to inform their father, and Helios demanded that Zeus punish the offenders. When the storm finally cleared and the men set sail again, Zeus struck the ship with a bolt of lightning, and all the men except Odysseus died.

In versions of the story where Phaethusa is one of the Heliades and a sister of Phaethon, she and Lampetia were transformed into poplar or alder trees while mourning their brother's death. As trees, their tears continued to flow, and crystalized into amber. However, in the Argonautica, which takes place after Phaethon's death, Phaethusa and her sister are still alive and caring for their father's herds.

== Namesake ==
- 296 Phaëtusa
