= Eliade (surname) =

Eliade (Romanian pronunciation: [eliˈade]) and Eliad are surnames used by several Romanian people. They may refer to any of the following:

- Ion Heliade Rădulescu (also known as Eliade Rădulescu and Eliad) (1802–1872), writer, historian and philosopher
- Mircea Eliade, historian of religions and philosopher
- Pompiliu Eliade (1869–1914), literary historian and linguist
- Sandu Eliad, journalist and theater director

== See also ==
- Eliad (disambiguation)
- Heliades
- Eliade's Truth
- Eliada, Biblical figure
