= Merops (king of Aethiopia) =

Mythical king

In Greek mythology, Merops (Ancient Greek: Μέροψ, romanized: Mérops) is a king of a far-east land, Aethiopia. He became the husband of Clymene and putative father of her son Phaethon, who unbeknownst to Merops had actually been fathered by Helios, the god of the Sun. Merops raised Phaethon as his own without knowing the truth until the boy was killed while trying to drive the sun-chariot of his father. He appears in several texts, most notably Euripides's lost tragedy Phaethon and Ovid's Metamorphoses.

== Mythology ==
=== Euripides' Phaethon ===
Merops' most prominent appearance is in Euripides's fragmentary tragedy Phaethon of the fifth century BC, one of the earliest sources of Phaethon's tale. According to it, Merops was king of Aethiopia, a far-away eastern land very close to where Helios and his sister Eos (the goddess of the dawn) kept their horses, at the remotest boundary of the world; Aethiopians living on the western and easternmost edges of the world is found as early as Homer, allowing Merops' lands to enjoy an association with the sun god.

Merops, sovereign of that land, which from his four-horsed chariot first the rising sun strikes with his golden rays; and which its swarthy neighbours call The radiant stable of the Morn and Sun [...] The (Sun-)lord's hot flame rises high above the earth and scorches its remote parts, but keeps those near here moderate.

— Euripides, Phaethon fragments 771–772

Merops married Clymene, daughter of the Ocean. Clymene's secret liaison with Helios produced a child, Phaethon, but she lied that Merops was the true father of all her children. (Note: Schmitz 1867, s.v. Merops 2; Avery 1962, p. 703; Bell 1991, p. 131) Years passed, and as Phaethon grew up Merops arranged a marriage for him. The identity of the bride is not clear, but it is very likely it was one of the Heliades, daughters of Helios and Phaethon's half-sisters. Phaethon was obdurant to Merops' suggestions of marriage, and the two men clashed with the aging Merops urging Phaethon to agree to the proposal. Meanwhile, Clymene revealed to her son his true parentage, and encouraged him to visit his father Helios and get confirmation from him.

Phaethon asked Helios to drive his sun-chariot for a day, but his attempt was a disaster and he was struck from the sky. His smoldering corpse was brought back to the palace while preparations for the wedding were still in full swing, but Clymene tried to conceal the truth from Merops, still in joyous mood over the upcoming wedding and taking part in festive singing. He was horrified when he was alerted by a servant about the smoking body of his son. He interrogated a tutor about Phaethon's fate, and likewise the truth about his son's parentage was also revealed to him. In his fury and grief, Merops attacked Clymene, but she was saved-perhaps via the interference of a god (likely Oceanus, or even Helios himself), like her father-and the two were likely conciliated in the end.

=== Other sources ===
In Ovid's Metamorphoses Merops is mentioned only twice, but Ovid apparently follows Euripides in making him the husband of Clymene and the boy's stepfather. What is notable is that in this version, Phaethon openly knows (and is proud) of his true parentage, only travelling to meet Sol when his paternity is doubted; this introduces an oddity, for the presence of a husband and putative father is at conflict with an openly adulterous Clymene and divine-sired Phaethon. While Merops' inclusion bespeaks of the influence of Euripides in Ovid, his limited appearance is a clear sign of Ovid's choice to ignore the crux of the play and follow the versions where Clymene has no mortal husband. In Ovid, Phaethon's paternity is brought into question by his peer Epaphus, son of Zeus and Io who was born and raised in Egypt, implying that in the Metamorphoses Merops might be Egyptian rather than Aethiopian.

== Analysis ==
James Diggle thinks that the Aethiopian setting in Euripides' version indicates that Merops is dark-skinned but both Clymene and Phaethon are white in the play. Alternatively, Euripides' emphasis on the sun scorching their dark neighbours but being moderate for them could mean that everyone in Merops' palace was portrayed as white in contrast to his dark-skinned subjects (a theory that Diggle finds unconvincing).

In a version recorded by Hyginus, Phaethon was born to Clymenus (a son of Helios) and Merope, a reversal of the names Clymene and Merops.

== See also ==
- Amphitryon
- Tyndareus
- Acrisius

== Bibliography ==
- Avery, Catherine B., ed. (1962). New Century Classical Handbook. New York, US: Appleton-Century-Crofts.
- Bell, Robert E. (1991). Women of Classical Mythology: A Biographical Dictionary. ABC-Clio. ISBN 9780874365818.
- Collard, Christopher; Cropp, Martin, eds. (2009). Euripides Fragments: Oedipus-Chrysippus, Other Fragments. Loeb Classical Library 506. Cambridge, MA: Harvard University Press.
- Diggle, James (1970). Euripides: Phaethon. Cambridge Classical Texts and Commentaries. Vol. 12. Cambridge University Press. ISBN 978-0-521-60424-6.
- Gantz, Timothy (1993). Early Greek Myth: A Guide to Literary and Artistic Sources. Vol. I. Johns Hopkins University Press. ISBN 978-0-8018-5360-9.
- Hard, Robin (2004). The Routledge Handbook of Greek Mythology: Based on H. J. Rose's "Handbook of Greek Mythology". Routledge. ISBN 9780415186360.
- Homer; The Odyssey with an English Translation by A.T. Murray, PH.D. in two volumes. Cambridge, MA., Harvard University Press; London, William Heinemann, Ltd. 1919. Online version at the Perseus Digital Library.
- Hyginus, Gaius Julius, The Myths of Hyginus, edited and translated by Mary A. Grant, Lawrence: University of Kansas Press, 1960. Available on Topos Text.
- Lloyd-Jones, Hugh (December 1971). "Euripides, Phaethon by James Diggle, Euripides". The Classical Review. 21 (3). JSTOR i228538.
- Ovid (2000). Metamorphoses. Translated by Anthony S. Kline. Borders Classics. ISBN 9781587261565.
- Schmitz, Leonhard (1867). Smith, William (ed.). A Dictionary of Greek and Roman Biography and Mythology. London, UK: John Murray, printed by Spottiswoode and Co. Online version at the Perseus.tufts library.
- Strabo, The Geography of Strabo, Vols. 1-3, with an English translation by Hamilton, Hans Claude and Falconer, William. London: Henry G. Bohn, 1854-1857. Available online on Perseus Digital Library.
- Tripp, Edward (June 1970). Crowell's Handbook of Classical Mythology (1st ed.). Thomas Y. Crowell Co. ISBN 069022608X.
- Wright, Matthew (2019). The Lost Plays of Greek Tragedy. Vol. 2: Aeschylus, Sophocles and Euripides. London, UK: Bloomsbury Academic. ISBN 978-1-4742-7646-7.
