= Lampetia =

Daughter of Helios in Greek mythology

- Shepherdess of the Oxen of the Sun
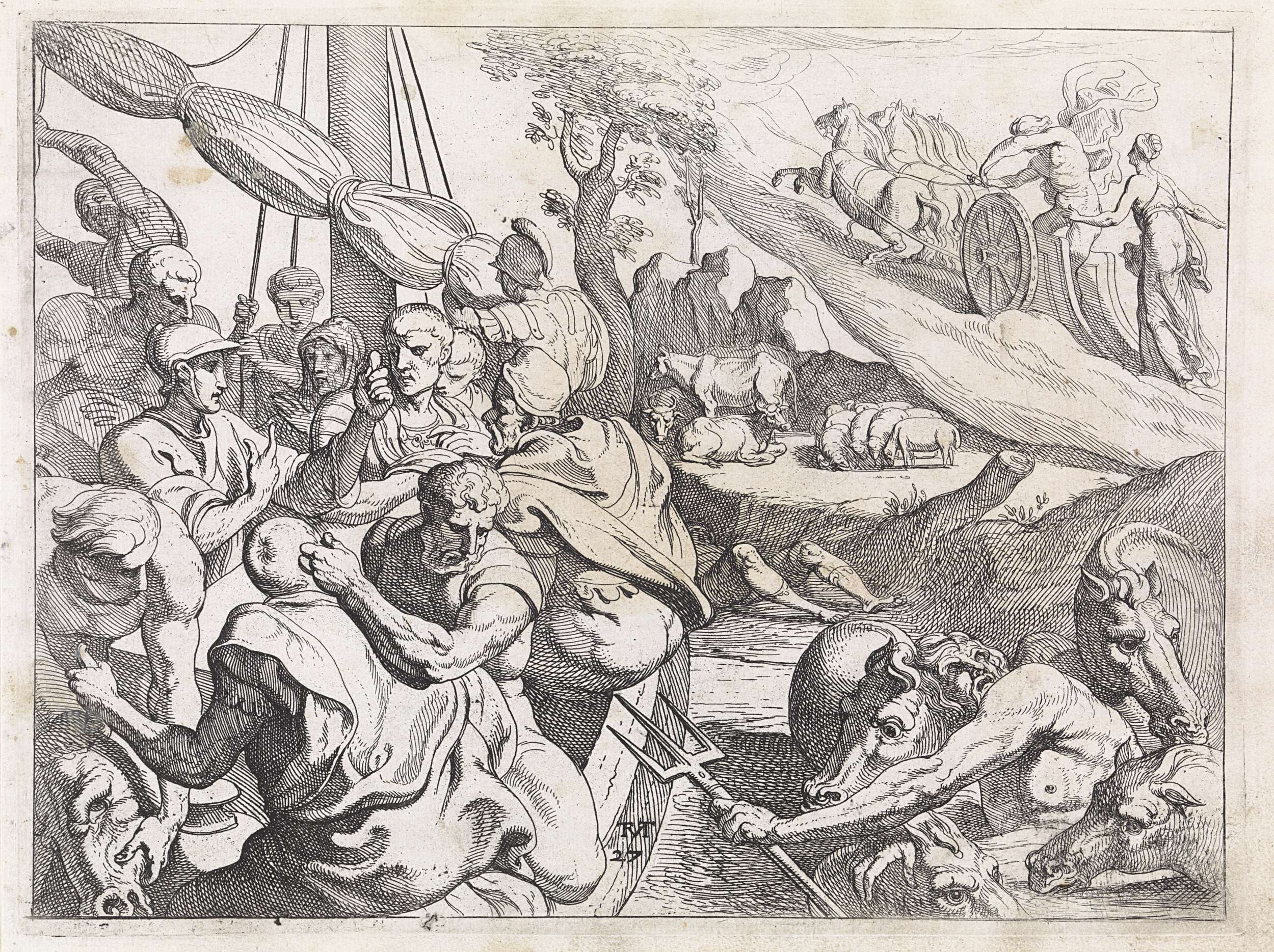
- Odysseus' men slay and eat the sacred cattle while one of Helios' daughters, Lampetia or Phaethusa, inform their father
- Abode: Thrinacia (Sicily)

Genealogy
- Parents: Helios (father); Neaera or Clymene (mother)
- Siblings: Phaethusa, Merope, Helie, Aegle, Phoebe, Aetherie, and Dioxippe
- Children: Machaon, Podaleirius, Iaso, Panacea, and Aegle

In Greek mythology, Lampetia /ˌlæmˈpiːʃə/ (Ancient Greek: Λαμπετίη, romanized: Lampetíē or Λαμπετία, Lampetía, 'shining') also spelled Lampetie, was a daughter of the sun god Helios. She and her sister Phaethusa watched over their father's prized herds of cattle and sheep on the island of Thrinacia (Sicily). Lampetia wielded an orichalcum staff and herded the cattle.

== Family ==
Lampetia is most commonly described as a daughter of Helios and Neaera, a minor goddess or nymph. In this telling, she had one younger sister: Phaethusa, but had many half-siblings through her father.

Lampetia has alternately been named as one of the Heliades, which would have made her the daughter of Helios and Clymene, an Oceanid. As one of the Heliades, she would have had up to seven biological sisters: Merope, Helie, Aegle, Phoebe, Aetherie, Phaethusa, and Dioxippe. However, different authors have named different combinations and numbers of Heliades. She would have also had a brother: Phaethon. Lampetia and Phaethusa still attended to their father's flocks in these versions.

In Hermippus' Trimeters, he writes that Lampetia bore five children by Asclepius, the god of medicine: Machaon, Podaleirius, Iaso, Panacea, and Aegle.

== Mythology ==
As children, Lampetia and Phaethusa were sent to Thrinacia (identified as Sicily) by Neaera to guard their father's prized herd of cattle and sheep. The animals were beautiful, with white coats and golden horns, and did not age or breed. In Homer's Odyssey, Odysseus and his men land on Thrinacia. A storm created by Zeus prevented the crew from leaving the island, and the men eventually ran out of supplies. While Odysseus was away praying, his men decided to kill and eat some of the sacred cattle; Lampetia and Phaethusa ran to inform their father, and Helios demanded that Zeus punish the offenders. When the storm finally cleared and the men set sail again, Zeus struck the ship with a bolt of lightning, and all the men except Odysseus died.

In versions of the story where Lampetia is one of the Heliades and a sister of Phaethon, Lampetia and Phaethusa were transformed into poplar or alder trees while mourning their brother's death. As trees, their tears continued to flow, and crystalized into amber. However, in the Argonautica, which takes place after Phaethon's death, Lampetia and Phaethusa are still alive and caring for their father's herds.
