= Eliad =

Eliad may refer to:

== Places ==
- Eliad, Golan Heights (Hebrew: אליעד), an Israeli settlement in the Golan Heights

== Persons ==
=== Given names ===
- Eliad Cohen (born 1988), Israeli producer, actor, model, entrepreneur
- Eliad Nachum (born 1990), Israeli singer and actor

=== Family names ===
- Nissim Eliad, born N. Amsalem; 1919–2014), Israeli politician

=== Others ===
- Ion Heliade Rădulescu (pen name is I. Eliad)

== See also ==
- Eliade (surname)
- Heliades, daughters of Helios
- Iliad
