= The Fall of Phaeton (Rubens) =

Painting by Peter Paul Rubens

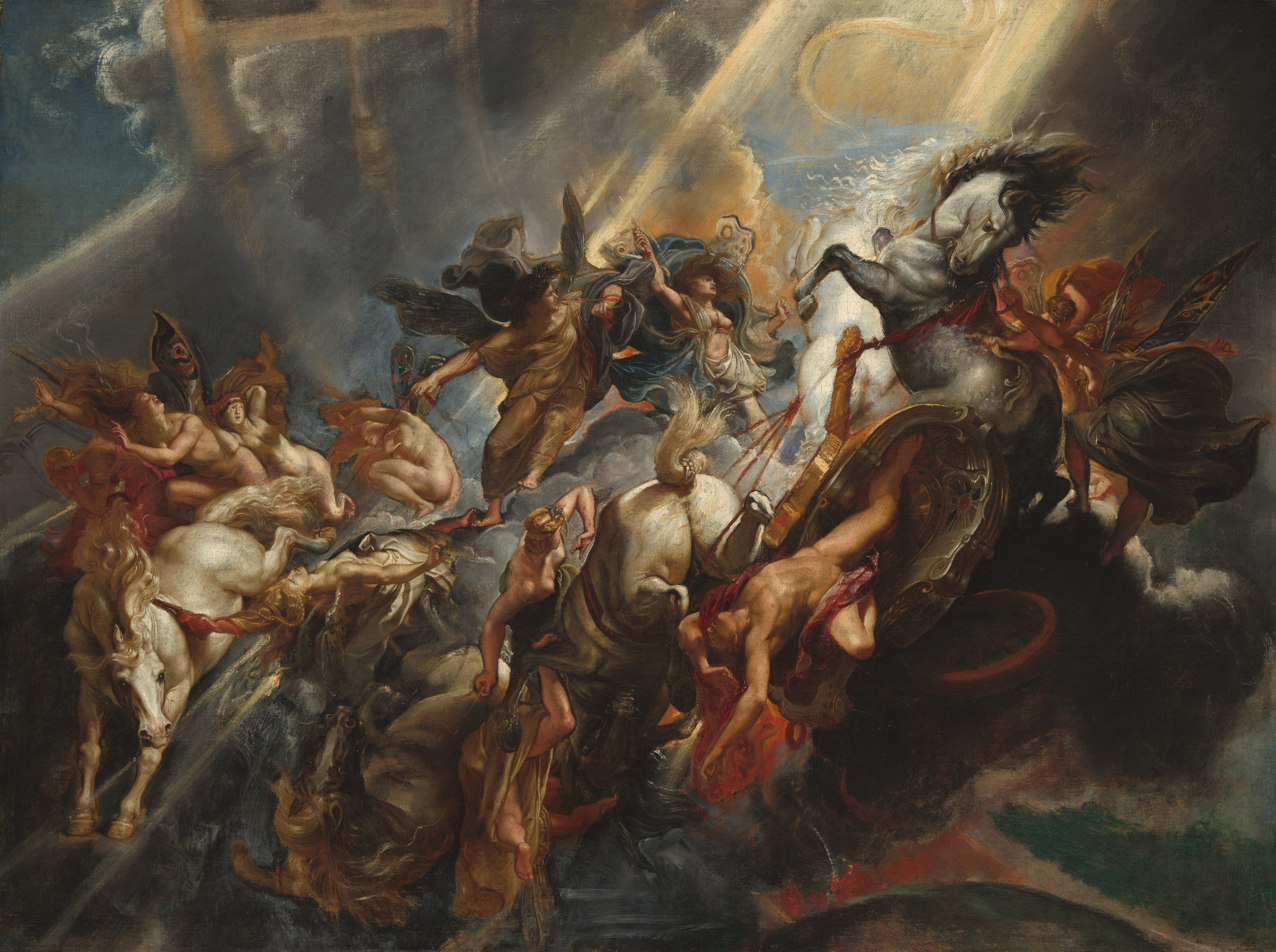
- Artist: Peter Paul Rubens
- Year: c. 1604/1605
- Medium: Oil on canvas
- Dimensions: 98.4 cm × 131.2 cm (38.7 in × 51.7 in)
- Location: National Gallery of Art, Washington, D.C.

The Fall of Phaeton is a painting by the Flemish master Peter Paul Rubens, featuring the ancient Greek myth of Phaeton (Phaethon), a recurring theme in visual arts. Rubens chose to depict the myth at the height of its action, with the thunderbolts hurled by Zeus to the right. The thunderbolts provide the light contrast to facilitate the display of horror on the faces of Phaeton, the horses and other figures while preserving the darkness of the event. The butterfly winged female figures represent the hours and seasons, who react in terror as the night and day cycle becomes disrupted. The great astrological circle that arches the heavens is also disrupted. The assemblage of bodies forms a diagonal oval in the center, separating dark and light sides of the canvas. The bodies are arranged so as to assist the viewer's travel continually around that oval.

Rubens painted The Fall of Phaeton in Rome and the painting was probably reworked later around 1606–1608. It has been housed in the National Gallery of Art since 5 January 1990. Rubens also painted other Greek mythological subjects, such as The Fall of Icarus, Perseus Freeing Andromeda, and The Judgement of Paris.

== Sketch ==
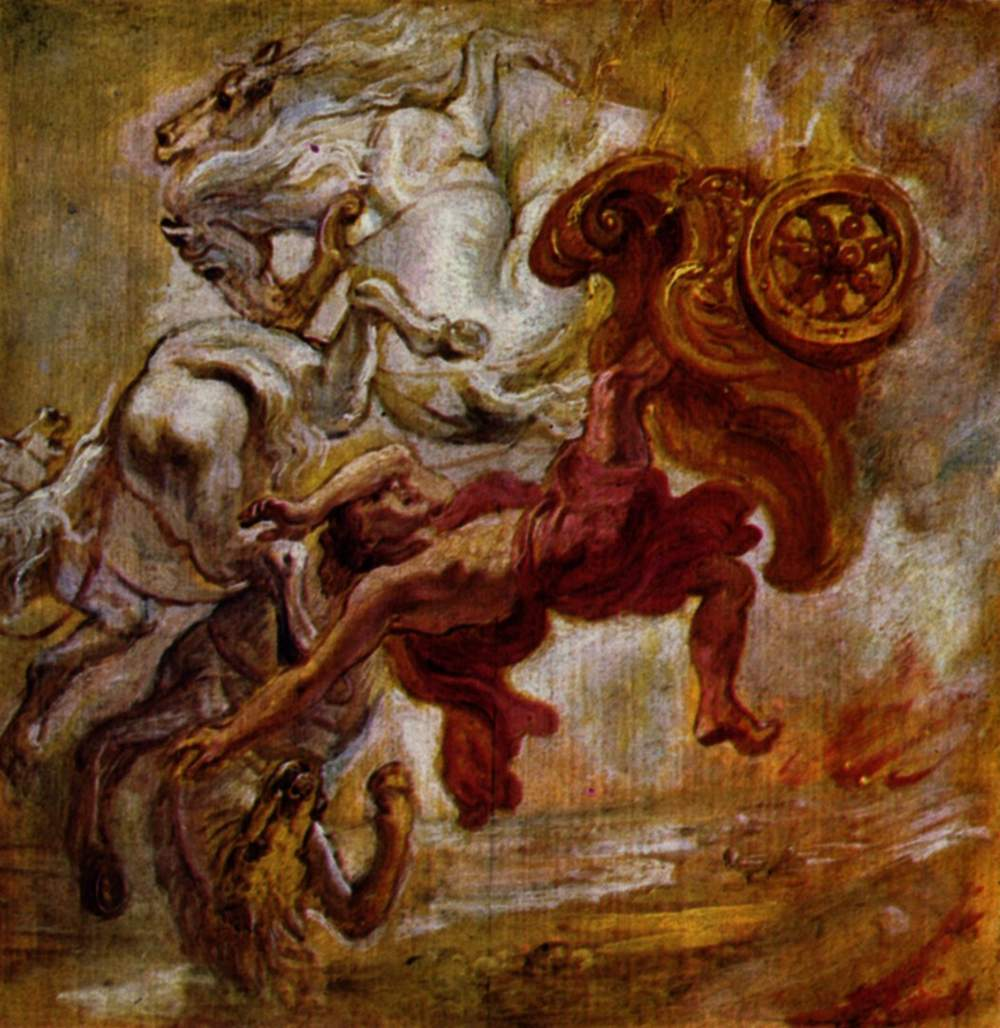
Oil on panel, 28.1×27.5 cm, Royal Museums of Fine Arts of Belgium
