= Phaethon =

Son of Helios in Greek mythology

The fall of Phaethon on a 2nd-century Roman sarcophagus in the Hermitage Museum, Russia

Phaethon (/ˈfeɪ.əθən/; Ancient Greek: Φαέθων, romanized: Phaéthōn, lit. 'shiner', pronounced [pʰa.é.tʰɔːn]), also spelled Phaëthon, is the son of the Oceanid Clymene and the sun god Helios in Greek mythology.

According to most authors, Phaethon is the son of Helios who, out of a desire to have his parentage confirmed, travels to the sun god's palace in the east. He is recognised by his father and asks for the privilege of driving his chariot for a single day. Despite Helios' fervent warnings and attempts to dissuade him, counting the numerous dangers he would face in his celestial journey and reminding Phaethon that only he can control the horses, the boy is not dissuaded and does not change his mind. He is then allowed to take the chariot's reins; his ride is disastrous, as he cannot keep a firm grip on the horses. As a result, he drives the chariot too close to the Earth, burning it, and too far from it, freezing it.

In the end, after many complaints, from the stars in the sky to the Earth itself, Zeus strikes Phaethon with one of his lightning bolts, killing him instantly. His dead body falls into the river Eridanus, and his sisters, the Heliades, cry tears of amber and are turned to black poplar as they mourn him.

Phaethon's tale was commonly used to explain why uninhabitable lands on both sides of extremity (such as hot deserts and frozen wastelands) exist, and why certain peoples have darker complexions, while his sisters' amber tears accounted for the river's rich deposits of amber.

== Etymology ==
Ancient Greek: Φαέθων means "radiant", from the verb φαέθω, meaning "to shine." Therefore, his name could be understood as, "the shining/radiant (one)" Ultimately the word derives from φάος, phaos, the Greek word for light, from the Proto-Indo-European root *bheh_{2}-, 'to shine.'

== Family ==
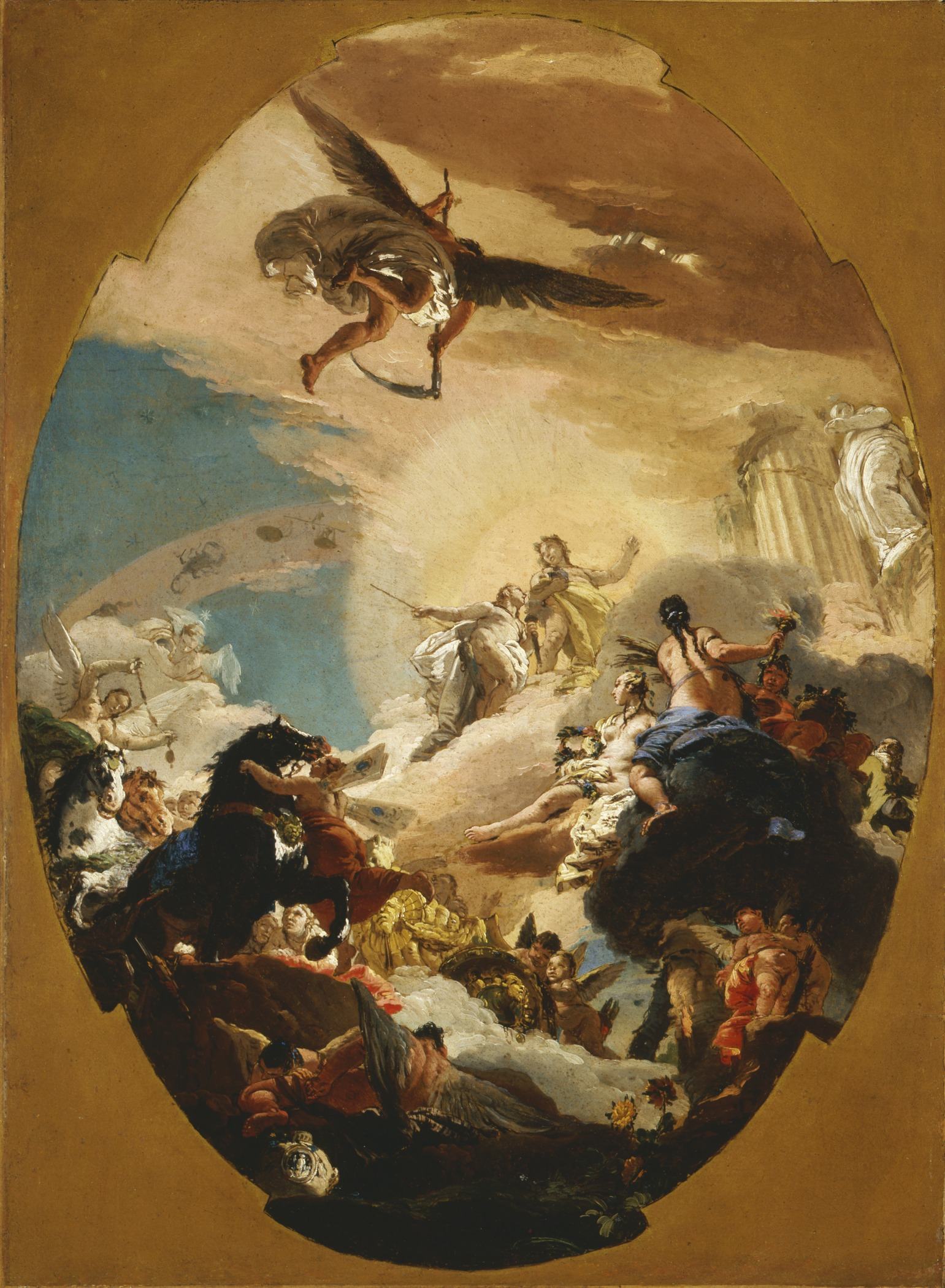
Apollo (as Helios the Sun) and Phaëthon, by Giovanni Battista Tiepolo, c. 1731

Phaethon was said to be the son of Clymene the Oceanid and Helios, god of the sun. Alternatively, less common genealogies make him a son of Clymenus by a different Oceanid, Merope, of Helios and Rhodos and thus a full brother of the Heliadae, or of Helios and Prote. According to a scholion on the Odyssey, Phaethon's mother Clymene was not an Oceanid, but rather a mortal woman, a daughter of Minyas, who married Helios.

== Mythology ==
Details vary across different versions, but most have Phaethon travel far east to meet his father, sometimes in order to get him to assure his paternity. There, he asks Helios for permission to drive his father's Sun-chariot for a single day. Despite Helios' protests and advice against, Phaethon does not back down from his initial wish, and thus Helios reluctantly allows him to drive his chariot. Placed in charge of the chariot, Phaethon was unable to control the horses. In some versions, the Earth first froze when the horses climbed too high, but when the chariot then scorched the Earth by swinging too near, Zeus decided to prevent disaster by striking it down with a thunderbolt. Phaethon fell to Earth and was killed in the process.

=== Homer and Hesiod ===
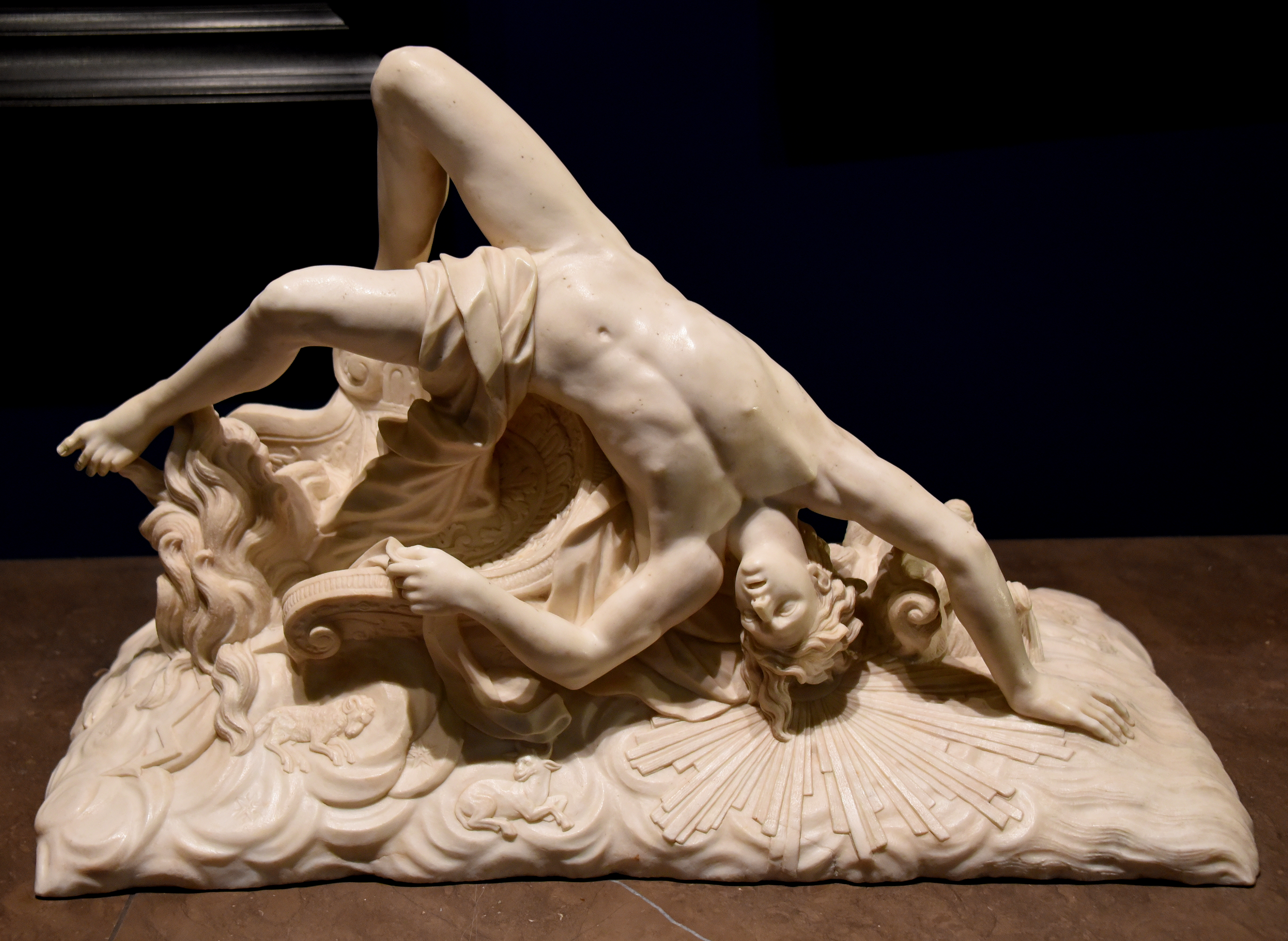
The Fall of Phaeton Statue; marble, c. 1700–1711 by Dominique Lefèvre, from Paris, France, now at The Victoria and Albert Museum, London

Although Helios himself is present in their works, for the two earliest ancient Greek authors, Homer and Hesiod, the chariot and the four horses that pull Helios each morning do not seem to exist at all; the oldest work in which they appear being the Homeric Hymns.

Neither seems to know Phaethon as an individual, as "Phaethon", meaning "the radiant" seems to be exclusively an epithet used for Helios by them. The only Phaethon Hesiod seems to recognize is the son of Eos, Helios' sister and the goddess of the dawn, whom she had by her lover Cephalus, an Athenian prince.

The late Roman author Hyginus however attributes a version of the story to Hesiod. According to Hyginus, Hesiod wrote that Phaethon was the son of Merope, an Oceanid, and Clymenus, a son of Helios by an unnamed woman or goddess. Phaethon, upon learning that his grandfather is the Sun, put his chariot to bad use, and scorched the Earth, turning the Indians black in the process. He was struck by a thunderbolt, and fell dead on the river Eridanus. Even the firmest believers of Hyginus find the attribution of the tale to Hesiod hard to accept. A fragment from Hesiod very possibly connects Eridanus to amber. It is uncertain, but possible, that the fragment also connected Eridanus and amber to the tears of the Heliades; what is certain however is that Hesiod was not connecting Eridanus, amber and perhaps the Heliades, to the myth of Phaethon.

=== The tragic poets ===
Ancient written sources for Phaethon
Author	Work	Date
Pseudo-Hesiod?	Unknown (lost)	7th century BC
Aeschylus	Heliades (lost)	late 500s-mid 400s BC
Philoxenus of Cythera	Unknown (lost)	5th to 4th century BC
Euripides	Phaethon (fragmentary), Hippolytus	ca 420s BC
Theodorides	Phaethon (lost)	363 BC
Plato	Timaeus	360 BC
Phanocles	Loves or Beautiful Boys (fragmentary)	336-323 BC
Palaephatus	On Unbelievable Tales	late 300s BC?
Apollonius Rhodius	Argonautica	200s BC
Nicander	Unknown (Heteroeumena?) (lost)	100s BC
Satyrus the Peripatetic	Unknown (lost)	180-146 BC
Diodorus Siculus	Bibliotheca historica	60-30 BC
Lucretius	De rerum natura	c. 50s BC
Cicero	De Natura Deorum	45 BC
Virgil	Aeneid	19 BC
Strabo	Geographica	7 BC - 23 AD
Ovid	Metamorphoses	8 AD
Seneca the Younger	Medea	c. 50 AD
Pliny the Elder	Natural History	77 AD
Valerius Flaccus	Argonautica	c.79 AD
Statius	Thebaid	80-90 AD
Plutarch	Moralia	c.100 AD
Lucian	Dialogues of the Gods; Amber, Or The Swans	100s AD
Pausanias	Description of Greece	150-180 AD
Hyginus	Fabulae, Astronomica	100s AD
Servius	Commentary on Aeneid	ca 300s AD-400s AD
Quintus Smyrnaeus	Posthomerica	Late 300s AD?
Nonnus	Dionysiaca	400s AD
[anonymous author]	Scholia on the Odyssey	5th century BC to 9th century?
First and Second Vatican Mythographers	Mythography	9th–11th century?
John Tzetzes	Chiliades	12th century

A now-lost tragedy by Aeschylus, titled Heliades ("daughters of the Sun") was written covering the subject of this myth. Very little of this play survives now, and the form of the myth as assumed by Aeschylus is impossible to know. It would seem that in Aeschylus' play, the sisters played a significant role; two of the surviving fragments (F 71 and F 72) focus on grief, mourning, and lamentation. He seems to have transferred the location of Phaethon's fall in Iberia, west of Italy.

By contrast, Euripides' version of the story, the now lost tragedy Phaethon, while similarly fragmentary, is much better preserved, with twelve fragments surviving covering some 400 lines of text. According to the summary of the play, Phaethon is the son of Helios by an Oceanid named Clymene, who nonetheless hid the boy's true parentage and claimed he had been fathered by her nominal husband Merops, the king of Aethiopia (Merops and Clymene are an interesting swap of the names in Hyginus' Hesiodic version, Merope and Clymenus). The main conflict of the play is the upcoming marriage of an unwilling Phaethon.

The identity of the bride seems to be this fragmentary play's greatest mystery. Euripides seems to have made Aphrodite the bride of the unfortunate youth; if that is the case, then it would seem that Euripides combined the stories of two Phaethons, that of the son of Helios who drove his father's car and died, and that of Phaethon the son of Helios' sister Eos whom Aphrodite abducted to be a watchman of her shrines, and whom late antiquity writers described as a lover of the goddess, as suggested by Wilamowitz. Another explanation on how Phaethon could possibly be marrying the goddess of beauty is that Aphrodite had planned Phaethon's destruction from the very beginning, as revenge against his father for revealing to Hephaestus, her husband, the goddess' affair with Ares, the god of war. Henri Weil suggested that Phaethon is to marry one of the Heliades, and James Diggle, while deeming this suggestion unprovable, is convinced of it being the case.

Clymene reveals her son his true parentage, perhaps to help him overcome his reluctance to get married. Although doubtful at first, his mother's words convince him and agrees to travel east to find his divine father and have his parentage confirmed. What happens next is that someone, perhaps a paedagogus, arrives in the scene to inform the audience of Phaethon's disastrous ride. According to his account, Helios actually escorted his son on his doomed journey, riding on a horse named Sirius next to him and shouting instructions and advice on how to drive the chariot, an element not found in subsequent treatments of the myth.

When he had heard that much, the boy seized the reins; he struck the flanks of the chariot's winged horses and set them going, and the mares flew to heaven's folds. Behind him his father mounted Sirius and rode advising the boy, 'Drive over there! Turn the chariot this way, this way!'

— Euripides, Phaethon, fr. 779 (translated by Christopher Collard and Martin Cropp)

Surviving fragments do not clearly paint Zeus as the culprit of Phaethon's death; but next Clymene orders slave girls to hide Phaethon's smoking body from Merops (who is still unaware both of Phaethon's true parentage as well as his fiery death), pointing to Zeus having indeed played a role in the boy's death. Merops discovers his son's charred corpse, and the truth, a bit later.

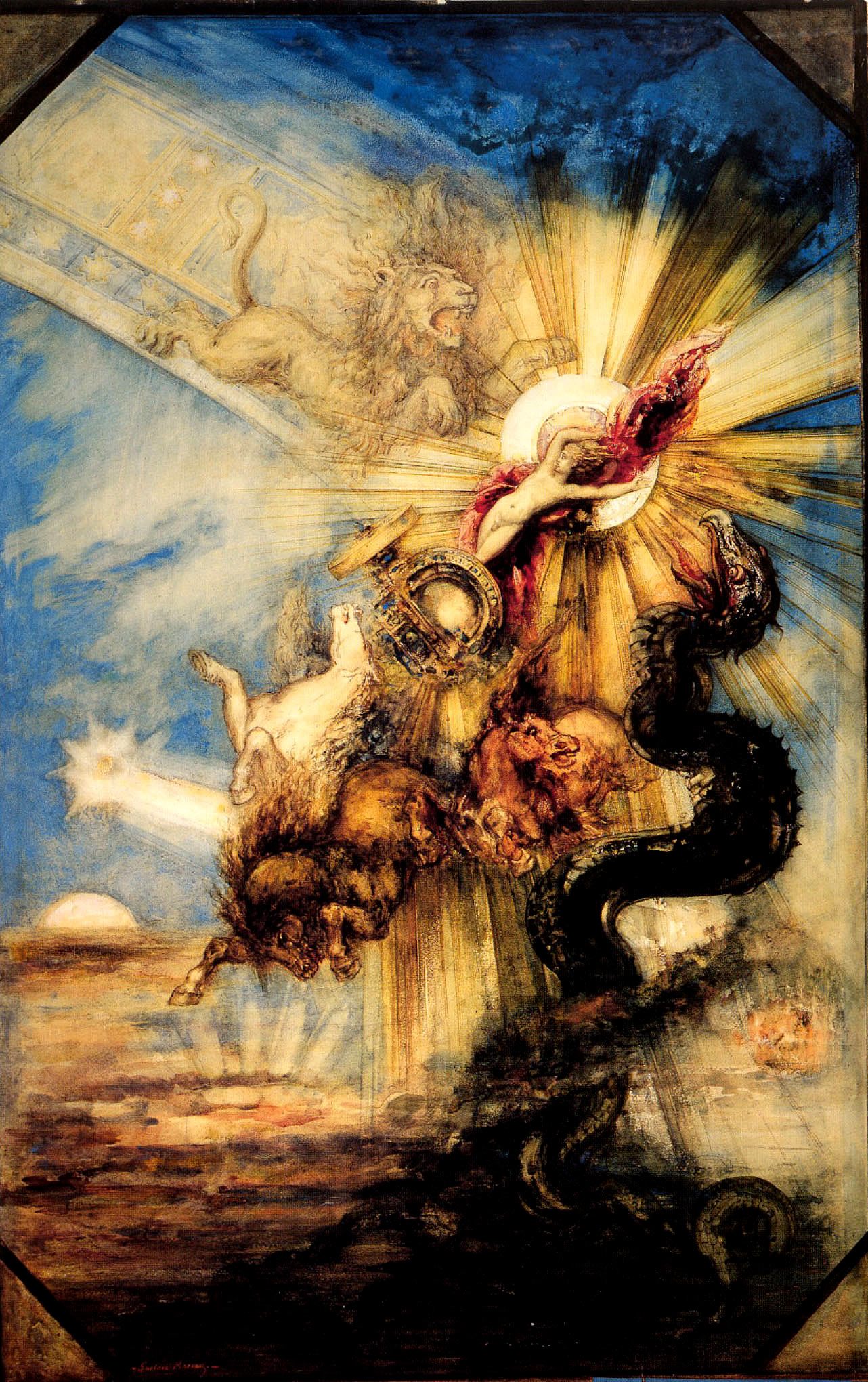
Phaethon by Gustave Moreau.

The only other tragedy about the myth is Theodorides' now lost Phaethon, performed in 363 BC at the Lenaea festival, nothing of which survives to us.

=== Brief references to the myth of Phaethon ===
With Aeschylus being the earliest (as far as it can be determined) that Phaethon's story would have been known, the next mention possibly came from a lost work of Philoxenus of Cythera (435~434 – 380~379 BC), a dithyrambic poet. Pliny the Elder mentions him second (after Aeschylus) among the authors who spoke of the myth of the Sun god's son. Pliny also names Nicander and Satyrus as other authors who knew of Phaethon.

==== Plato's Timaeus ====
In Plato's Timaeus, Critias tells the story of Atlantis as recounted to Solon by an Egyptian priest, who prefaced the story by saying:

There have been, and will be again, many destructions of mankind arising out of many causes; the greatest have been brought about by the agencies of fire and water, and other lesser ones by innumerable other causes. There is a story that even you [Greeks] have preserved, that once upon a time, Phaethon, the son of Helios, having yoked the steeds in his father's chariot, because he was not able to drive them in the path of his father, burnt up all that was upon the earth, and was himself destroyed by a thunderbolt. Now, this has the form of a myth, but really signifies a declination of the bodies moving in the heavens around the Earth, and a great conflagration of things upon the Earth, which recurs after long intervals.

==== Authors of the Hellenistic era ====
Like other authors of around this period, Palaephatus's version is not too rich in details. Naming no mother, Palaphaetus speaks of Phaethon as a son of Helios who had the irrational desire to drive his father's chariot, but had no knowledge of how to handle the reins. Unable to keep balance he was swept off course by the wild horses and drowned into the Eridanus river. Unlike several other retellings, a party behind Phaethon's death is not named, as Zeus takes no action to stop Phaethon and save the Earth.

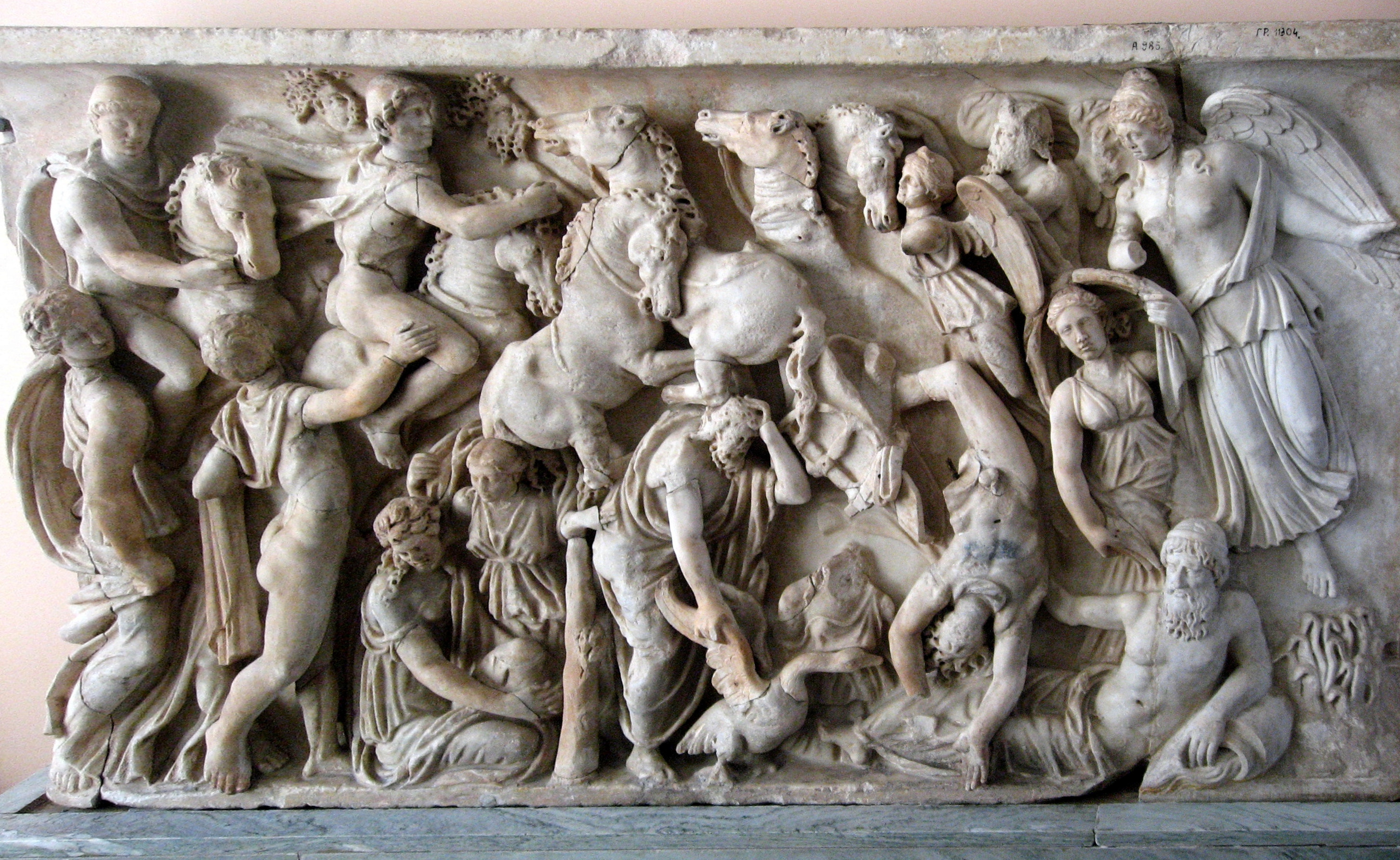
The Fall of Phaëthon on a Roman sarcophagus (Hermitage Museum)

In the Argonautica, while sailing up the Eridanus river on their way back, the Argonauts reach the outfall of the deep lake where Phaethon fell after he was struck with a lightning bolt. During the day, the crew of the Argo was tormented by the nauseating stench from Phaethon's corpse, still smoldering after all this time, and at night they had to listen to the lament of his sisters, now turned into poplar trees and shedding tears of amber.

In Diodorus Siculus' Bibliotheca Historica, Phaethon, the son of Helios, while still a youth persuaded his father to retire for a single day and give to him his chariot. His father eventually yielded to his son's wishes, and gave him his quadriga. The boy was unable to control the reins, and the horses left their accustomed course, setting ablaze the Heavens (creating the Milky Way) and the Earth (creating uninhabitable land) alike. Zeus, seeing the catastrophe, smote Phaethon with a thunderbolt and brought the Sun to its course. Phaethon fell into the Eridanus river, dead. His sisters mourned him, and turned into black poplar trees.

=== Ovid ===
The influence of Euripides' lost play can be easily recognized in Ovid's own version of the myth. Another possible inspiration of Ovid's version might have been Nicander, who is known to have written about Phaethon in some work, perhaps attested in the lost Heteroeumena (loosely translating into "transformations"). In the version of the myth told by Ovid, Phaethon is the son of Clymene and Sol, and Phaethon would often boast about being the son of the sun-god. Phaethon, challenged by Epaphus and his playmates, sought assurance from his mother that his father was truly Sol. She gave him the requested assurance and told him to turn to his father for confirmation. He asked his father for some proof that would demonstrate his relationship with the Sun. When the god swore by the river Styx to grant him whatever he wanted, he insisted on being allowed to drive the Sun chariot for a day. Sol tried to talk him out of it by telling him that not even Jupiter (the king of the gods) would dare to drive it, as the chariot was fiery hot and the horses breathed out flames. He said:

The first part of the track is steep, and one that my fresh horses at dawn can hardly climb. In mid-heaven it is highest, where to look down on earth and sea often alarms even me and makes my heart tremble with awesome fear. The last part of the track is downwards and needs sure control. Then even Tethys herself, who receives me in her submissive waves, is accustomed to fear that I might dive headlong. Moreover, the rushing sky is constantly turning, and drags along the remote stars, and whirls them in rapid orbits. I move the opposite way, and its momentum does not overcome me as it does all other things, and I ride contrary to its swift rotation. Suppose you are given the chariot. What will you do? Will you be able to counter the turning poles so that the swiftness of the skies does not carry you away? Perhaps you conceive in imagination that there are groves there and cities of the gods and temples with rich gifts. The way runs through the ambush, and apparitions of wild beasts! Even if you keep your course, and do not steer awry, you must still avoid the horns of Taurus the Bull, Sagittarius the Haemonian Archer, raging Leo and Lion's jaw, Scorpio's cruel pincers sweeping out to encircle you from one side, and Cancer's crab-claws reaching out from the other. You will not easily rule those proud horses, breathing out through mouth and nostrils the fires burning in their chests. They scarcely tolerate my control when their fierce spirits are hot, and their necks resist the reins. Beware, my boy, that I am not the source of a gift fatal to you, while something can still be done to set right your request!

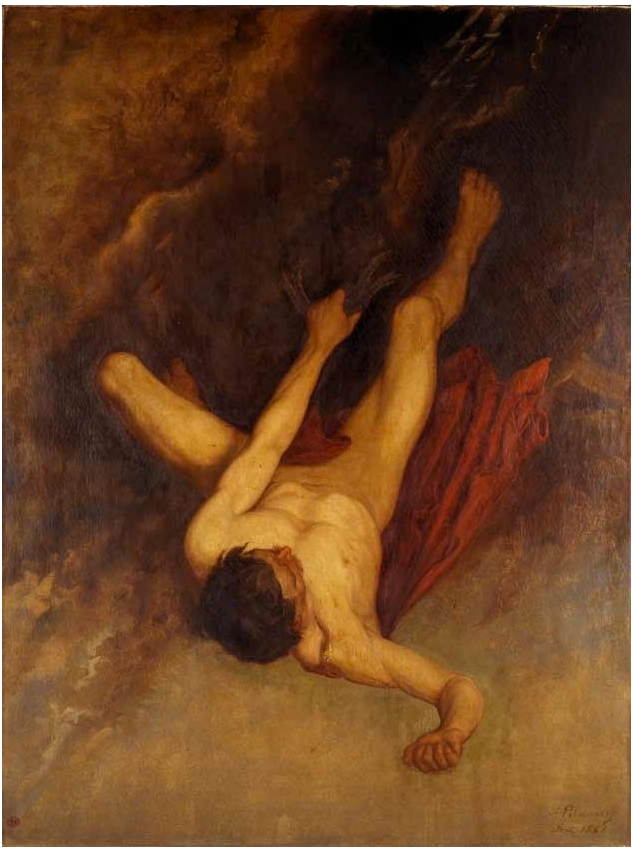
The fall of Phaethon by Adolphe Pierre Sunaert

Phaethon, however, was adamant, and thus Sol was forced to relent. When the day came, the fierce horses that drew the chariot felt that it was empty because of the lack of the sun-god's weight and went out of control. Terrified, Phaethon dropped the reins. The horses veered from their course, scorching the Earth, burning the vegetation, bringing the blood of the Ethiopians to the surface of their skin and so turning it black, changing much of Africa into a desert, drying up rivers and lakes and shrinking the sea. Earth cried out to Jupiter who was forced to intervene by striking Phaethon with a lightning bolt. Like a falling star, Phaethon plunged blazing into the river Eridanus.

The epitaph on his tomb was:

Here Phaethon lies who in the sun-god's chariot fared. And though greatly he failed, more greatly he dared.

Sol, stricken with grief at his son's death, at first refused to resume his work of driving his chariot, but at the appeal of the other gods, including Jupiter who used threats, returned to his task.

The detail of Phaethon questioning the parentage he otherwise took pride in being the result of Epaphus' words is also present in the works of Servius, who wrote that Epaphus, now presented as the succeeded king of Egypt, mocked Phaethon for being born out of adultery; the outcome is largely the same, as Phaethon travels east to meet his father, gets Helios to promise him any favor, and then drives the chariot with disastrous results.

=== Other late authors ===
Philostratus of Lemnos, who follows the typical premise of Phaethon's tale (son of Helios who asks his father to drive his chariot and ends up burning the Earth) describes in great detail the extent of the catastrophe, putting more detail in the picture and the visual representation rather than the action; Night drives away Day from the noonday sky, the Sun's orb plunges into the Earth pulling the stars along with him, the Seasons abandon their posts in fear, and Earth raises her hands in supplication as she burns. Ultimately, Phaethon falls from the chariot, on fire, and dies. The Eridanus mourns him along with the Heliades.

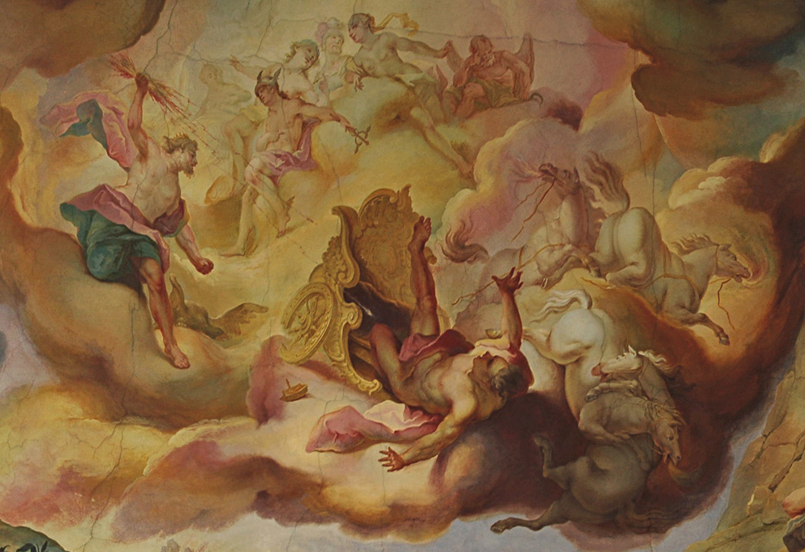
Fall of Phaethon, by Johann Michael Franz

According to Clement of Alexandria "... in the time of Crotopus occurred the burning of Phaethon, and the deluges of Deucalion". In The Twelve Caesars, Suetonius attributes to the emperor Tiberius the following repeated remark about the future emperor Caligula: "That to allow Gaius to live would prove the ruin of himself and of all men, and that he was raising a viper for the Roman people and a Phaethon for the world".

A scholiast on Homer's Odyssey provides a different parentage for Phaethon, making him the son of Helios and Rhodos instead (with him and his three sisters replacing the Heliadae), here the daughter of Asopus, the river god. The scholiast follows the version of Phaethon being raised by his mother; when he learns the truth, he seeks out Helios and asks him to drive his chariot. Helios allows him not due to some promise or vow he made to his son, but rather because of his son's persistence, despite knowing what would follow. According to other authors, Zeus strikes him with a thunderbolt. The element of Helios knowing what's in store for his child, but being unable to thwart it, is present in several tellings; Statius writes that "with tears did he warn the rejoicing youth of treacherous stars and zones that would fain not be o'errun and the temperate heat that lies midway between the poles; obedient was he and cautious, but he cruel Parcae would not suffer him to learn."

Valerius Flaccus gives attention to the wrecked chariot itself, and how Tethys, who is Phaethon's grandmother as well as the goddess who receives Helios in the western ocean as he sets, picks up the fragments of yoke and axle, and one of the horses too (Pyrois) who is fearful of a father's wrath.

Cicero, another Roman author, describes Sol as being "tricked" into letting his son drive his chariot, expressing surprise and disbelief that a god could be deceived like that.

Seneca speaks of Phaethon, the "youth who dared drive the everlasting chariot, heedless of his father's goal."

=== Phaethon as a legitimate offspring ===
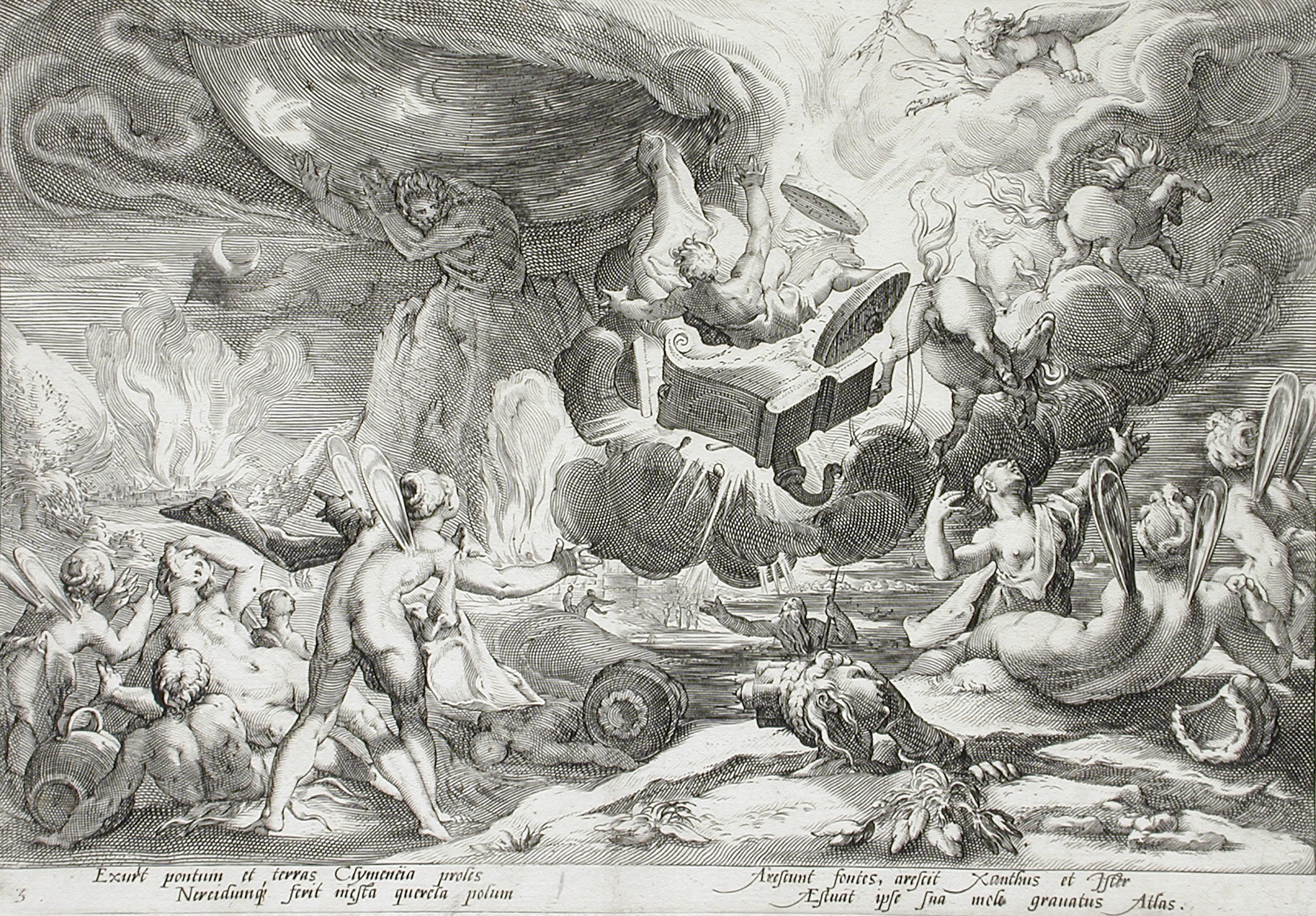
Phaeton Driving the Chariot of the Sun, by Hendrik Goltzius, (Holland, Mülbracht, 1590)

Hyginus wrote that Phaethon, son of Helios / Sol and Clymene, secretly mounted his father's chariot without said father's knowledge and leave, but with the aid of his sisters the Heliades who yoked the horses. Being inexperienced, Phaethon drove the chariot too high, and it was fear that made him plunge into the Eridanus; when Zeus struck him with a thunderbolt, the Earth began to burn. Zeus then, pretending to want to put out the fire, let loose all the rivers everywhere, causing the flood that drowned everyone except for Deucalion and Pyrrha. Phaethon secretly stealing the chariot, and his sisters helping him out perhaps implies the existence of an early version, where Phaethon and his (full) sisters are legitimate offspring of the Sun god and his wife, brought up in their father's house, rather than product(s) of an extramarital liaison. After his death, Phaethon was conveyed to the stars by his father as a constellation. The constellation associated with Phaethon was the Auriga, or the Charioteer.

The satirical author Lucian of Samosata treated the myth in a comedic matter in his Dialogues of the Gods. In the short dialogue, Zeus angrily berates Helios for letting his inexperienced son drive his chariot, which almost resulted in the world being destroyed. Helios acknowledges his error, but claims he was pressured by Phaethon and Phaethon's mother Clymene both (another implication of the union between Helios and the mother of Phaethon being marital in nature, not an affair, and thus making their child legitimate), and could have not foreseen the extent of the disaster. Zeus is displeased to hear it, unconvinced that he would not know that an inexperienced driver like Phaethon would not be able to control the steeds. Helios then asks Zeus to be merciful, as his son has already been punished (being dead) and he himself is in great mourning. Zeus disagrees that this punishment is enough, returns Helios his damaged chariot which is in need of repair, and threatens to strike him with one of his thunderbolts should he ever do such thing again. In True History, another work of Lucian's, Phaethon is the king of the Sun and is at war with the Moon, ruled by King Endymion.

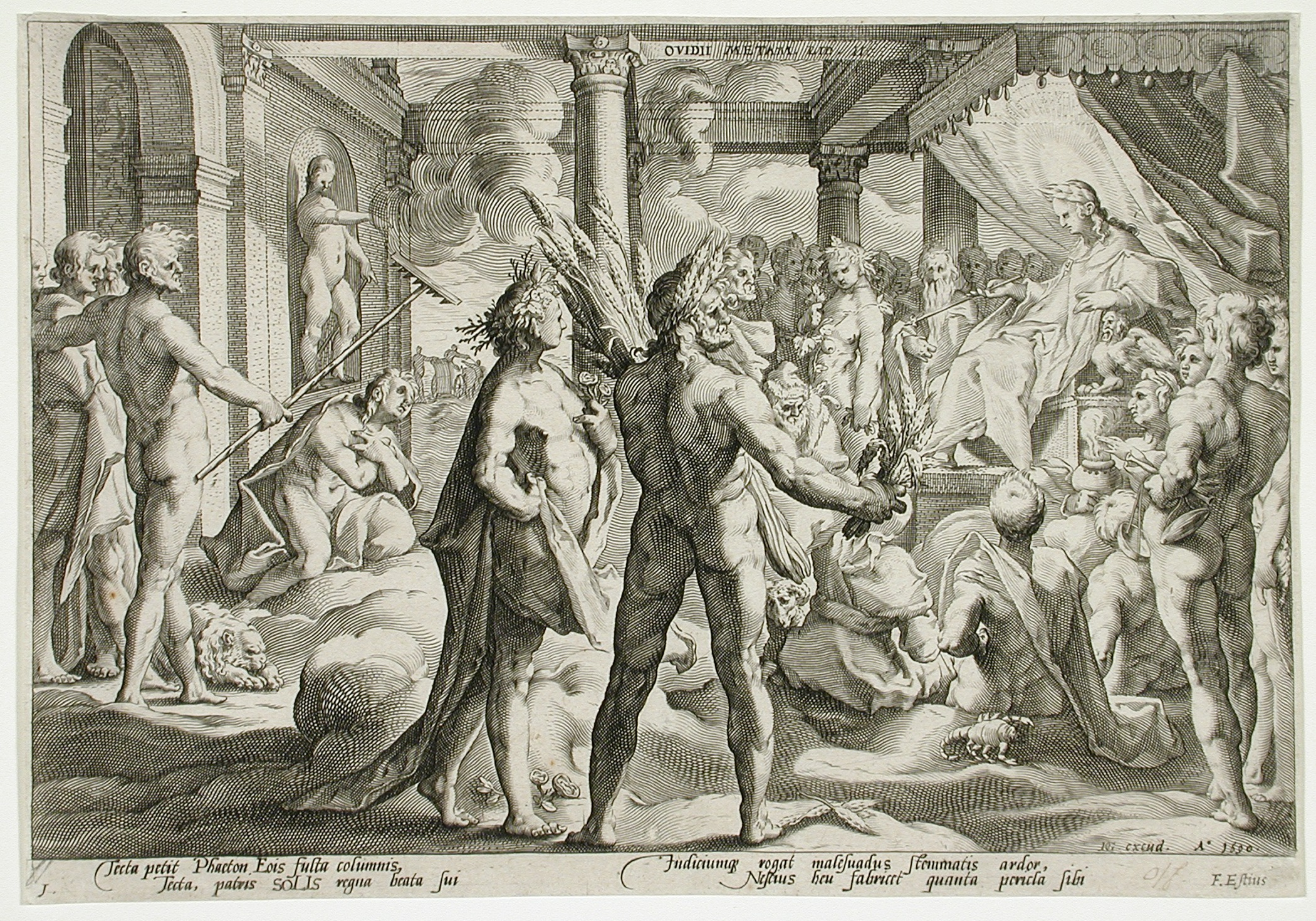
Phaethon asks his father for the chariot, engraving by Hendrik Goltzius, 1590

Nonnus' late version of the story is one of the two extensive narratives to survive, the other being Ovid's. In Nonnus' account, found in his epic Dionysiaca, Hermes tells Dionysus the tragic story of Phaethon. Helios and the beautiful nymph Clymene fall in love and get married with her father Oceanus' blessing, and together they have Phaethon. Phaethon is raised by his parents, in the company of Oceanus and the Oceanid nymphs. As a boy, he would mimic his father and his daily journey by driving a wagon of his own design, with burning torches standing in for the fire. When he grows up, he begs his father to let him drive his chariot, but Helios refuses, arguing that sons are not necessarily fit to follow on their fathers' footsteps (bringing up how Ares, Hephaestus, Apollo and Hermes do not hold lightning bolts like their father Zeus does). Phaethon nevertheless is not a bit discouraged by his worried father's words, and then pressures him more, as does Clymene; with great reluctance, Helios consents, and gives his son a very extensive and detailed speech about all the dangers and the hazards of the ride. He then dresses Phaethon up in his own robes, helmet and solar crown and gives him the reins. With a final warning from his father, Phaethon yokes the horses and ascends in the sky, as his mother Clymene cheerfully waves him goodbye, still unaware of the danger that awaits her son. Like in all other versions, his ride is a disaster, as he burns the Earth. Zeus then kills him with a lightning bolt, and places him among the stars as the constellation Auriga, the charioteer of the heavens. Nonnus's version of the events is similar to that of Lucian, as both make (or imply) Clymene a wife to Helios, their son Phaethon born in marriage, and Clymene is actively present in persuading Helios to let their son drive the chariot.

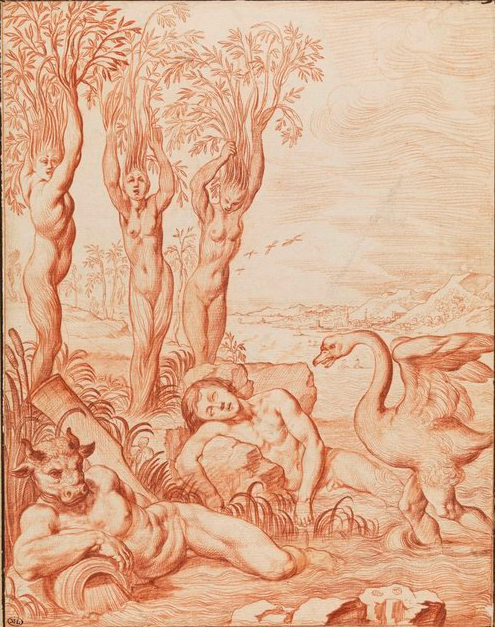
The Heliades by Pierre Brébiette.

=== Mourning for Phaethon ===
==== The mournful sisters ====
A very common element of the story is that Phaethon's sisters, the Heliades, mourn his death by the river and transform into black poplars, shedding tears of amber for their lost brother. According to Pliny the Elder, it was Aeschylus who introduced the transformation of the sisters into poplar trees. Their number and names vary; a scholiast on Homer gives an alternative parentage where Phaethon and his three sisters (Phaethusa, Lampetia and Aegle) are the children of Helios and Rhodos, here the daughter of Asopus. Hyginus names seven; Merope, Helie, Aegle, Lampetia, Phoebe, Aetherie and Dioxippe. Ovid has at least three, but only two (Phaethusa and Lampetia) are named. Servius only mentions Phaethusa and Lampetia.

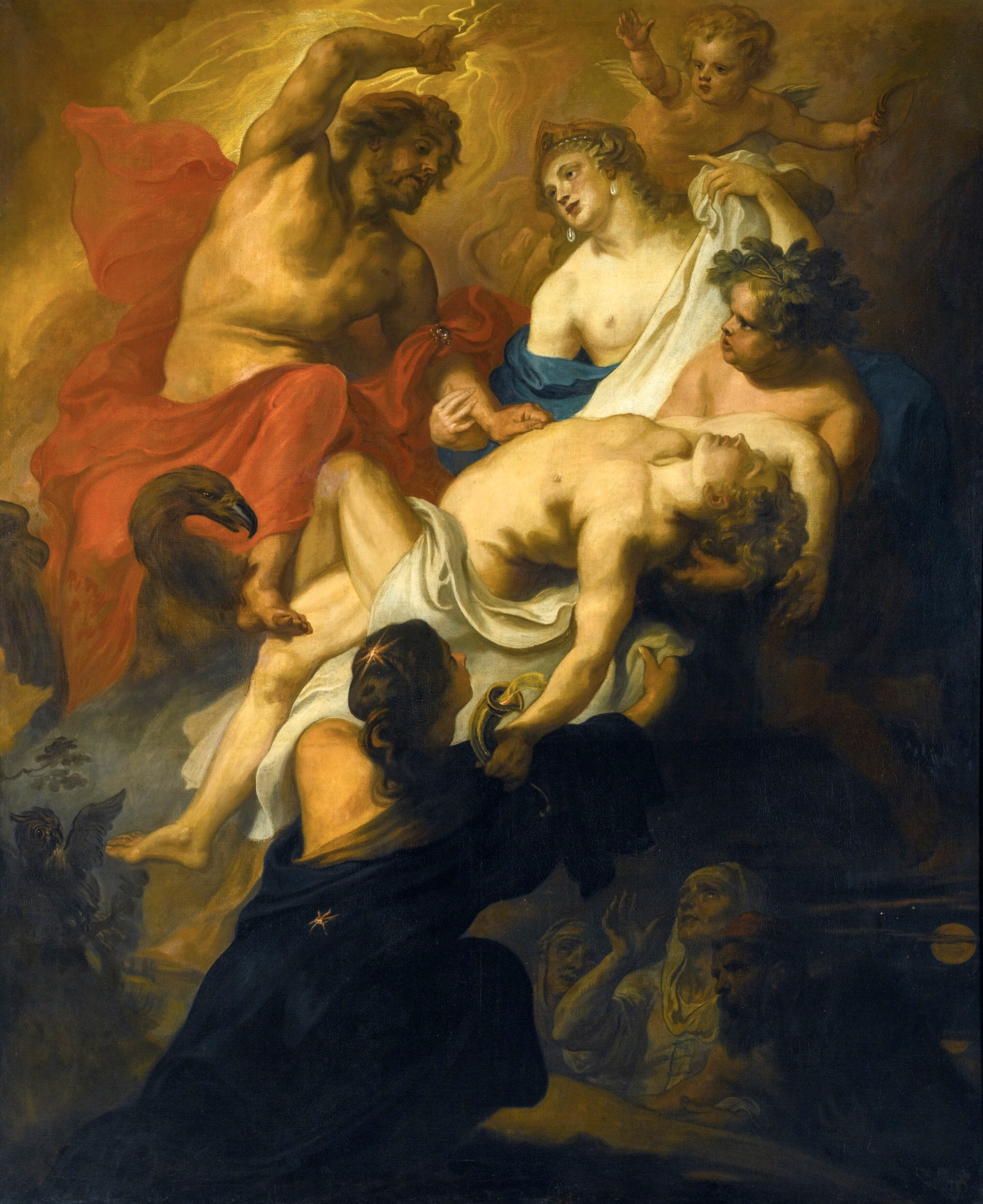
The Gods mourning Phaeton by Theodoor van Thulden

Although the Heliades' role and fate in the myth is not mentioned in any of the surviving fragments of Phaethon, Euripides briefly brings up the Heliades and their shedding of amber tears for their brother by the Eridanus in another play, Hippolytus.

Ovid vividly describes the sisters cry and mourn for their brother by the banks of the Eridanus for four months unmoving. Then, as they try to move, find themselves rooted to the ground, unable to leave. Their mother Clymene finds them, and although she tries to free her daughters by breaking off the forming branches and snapping the barks, she is unable to help them and the metamorphosis is completed.

The Odyssey scholiast writes that Zeus, feeling pity for them, changed them into the amber-crying poplar trees, and allowing them to retain the memories of their old lives and sorrows.

The part concerning the Heliades might have been a mythical device to account for the origin of amber; it is probably of no coincidence that the Greek word for amber, elektron (ἤλεκτρον), resembles elektor (ἠλέκτωρ), an epithet of Helios. The poplar tree was considered sacred to Helios, due to the sun-like brilliance its shining leaves have.

Quintus Smyrnaeus described that Helios turned their tears into amber, for their honor to Phaethon, and Hyginus wrote that they were transformed into trees for yoking the chariot without their father's consent.

==== The mournful lover ====
Later authors, particularly the Romans, mention the story of Cycnus, a man who was Phaethon's lover and deeply mourned his death and was turned into a swan, birds who are known for mourning the loss of their mates for days. The earliest of these authors appears to have been Phanocles. In Ovid's account, the gods turned the inconsolable Cycnus into a swan soon after Phaethon's own death; even as a swan he retained memories of Phaethon's fiery demise, and the bird would thereafter avoid the sun's heat. Virgil instead writes that Cycnus mourned for Phaethon well into his old age, thereupon he was turned into a swan, his white hair becoming the bird's white feathers upon transformation. Pausanias and Servius explicitly name Apollo as the god who turned Cycnus into a swan, after having blessed him with talent in singing at some time before; Apollo then placed him among the stars, as the constellation Cygnus, "the swan". Cycnus' profession as a musician seems to be a direct reference to the swan song swans are famous for.

== Artistic evidence ==
On one of the earliest extant artistic attestations of the myth, a cast taken from an Arretine mould now housed in the Museum of Fine Arts, Boston, Phaethon is shown fallen from the car, a wheel lying next to him while another is being collected by the water goddess Tethys, his grandmother, as Valerius Flaccus wrote. The god behind Phaethon's death, Zeus, is seen hurling his thunderbolt, while Helios appears on horse-back, with a spare horse by his side (matching Euripides' telling where Helios accompanies his son in the sky), having caught two of the horses and now directing his attention to the other two (like Lucretius describes him doing). Artemis is there too, perhaps alluding to some obscure version where she played a role in the story, as is Iris, the rainbow and messenger goddess. Another figure, perhaps Isis, is also present. An Apulian crater of c. 360-350 has a scene with named characters Merops, Clymene and Melanippus (TrGF adesp . 5f).

The myth of father and son was immortalized in Corinth (where Helios had a significant cult), where Pausanias describes two gilded chariots, one carrying Phaethon the other Helios, adorning a gateaway near Corinth's market:

On leaving the market-place along the road to Lechaeum you come to a gateway, on which are two gilded chariots, one carrying Phaethon the son of Helius (Sun), the other Helius himself.

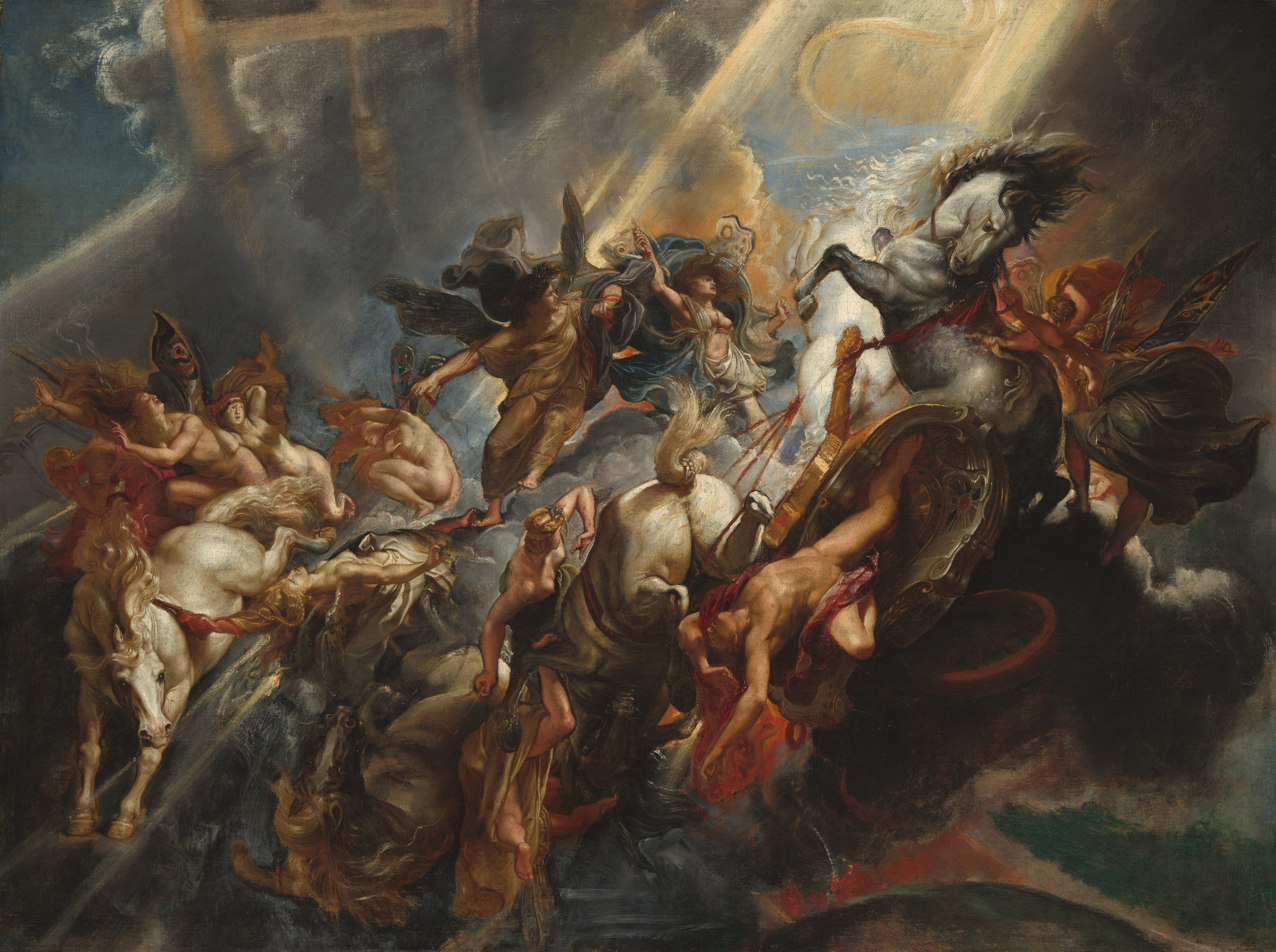
The Fall of Phaethon by Peter Paul Rubens, c. 1604/1605

== Connections ==
The lesser-known myth of Sirius the dog star god and the harvest goddess Opora share some elements with the myth of Phaethon. In that myth, Sirius visits the earth on some mission but then meets and falls in love with Opora. His unfulfilled love makes him burn hotter, which results in the humans suffering under the great heat he causes. They pray to the gods, and eventually Boreas the god of the north wind orders his sons to deliver Opora to Sirius while he uses cold wind blasts to cool the earth. To commemorate the event, Sirius would continue to burn hot each year during the harvest season, explaining the intense heat of the dog-days of summer, attributed to Sirius by the ancients. In addition, some ancient authors used 'Sirius' (meaning "scorching") as an epithet for Helios himself.

Phaethon's story shares some similarities to the myth of Asclepius, as mortal sons of divine fathers (Helios and Apollo) who disrupted natural order (Phaethon by driving the chariot off-course, Asclepius by resurrecting the dead) and were then killed by Zeus in order to establish that order again after complains from other divinities (Gaia and Hades), bringing sorrow to said fathers. Phaethon's myth was the preeminent myth involving amber in classical antiquity, and according to Celtic tradition, Apollo shed tears of amber for Asclepius' death; while Apollo's association with amber is not extraordinary, the context of it (mourning for his son) is significant. Diodorus Siculus in his own account of Phaethon ended by saying that amber was commonly used in connection to mourning the death of young people, and the link between resin and tears was not an uncommon one, as seen in the myths of Myrrha and Meleager (according to a lost play by Sophocles); the ancient Greek word for tear dakruon could also mean sap or gum. The first of the Vatican Mythographers tried to merge the two myths, writing that Phaethon brought Hippolytus back to life (Asclepius in myth), and that after he was killed by Zeus, Apollo slew the Sicilian smiths who forged Zeus' thunderbolts (Apollo slaying the Cyclopes who forged Zeus' lightning bolts after he slew Asclepius). The second narrative on Phaethon however, from the so-dubbed "Second Vatican Mythographer", recounts the more traditional version of the myth with no traces of amalgamation with other myths or any connection to Asclepius.

Phaethon, just like the nymph Clytie, is a Helios-related myth commonly associated with Apollo in modern times, although original Greek and Roman sources do not mention him. Although Ovid is largely seen as the reason for the conflation between the gods in post-classical times, he himself did not identify them; the father of Phaethon (and Clytie’s lover) is a solar but distinctive non-Apolline figure, described as the son of Hyperion, and existing separately from the god of light.

== Post-classical works ==
- Dante refers to the episode in the Inferno, in "Purgatorio" canto IV and Paradiso canto XVII of his Divine Comedy.
- William Shakespeare uses the story of Phaethon in four places, most famously as an allegory in his play Richard II, comparing the King to the divinity of the sun: "Down, down I come; like glistering Phaethon, wanting the manage of unruly jades" (3.3). He also makes Juliet wish "Phaëthon would whip [Phoebus's horses] to the west" as she waits for Romeo in Romeo and Juliet 3.2.3. It also appears briefly in The Two Gentlemen of Verona 3.1.154, and twice in Henry VI, Part 3 (1.4.33 and 2.6.12)
- John Marston includes reference to Phaeton in The Malcontent whereby Mendoza's monologue describes the '... sparkling glances (of women), ardent as those flames that singed the world by heedless Phaeton!' – act 1, sc 5
- Jean-Baptiste Lully wrote a musical tragedy, Phaëton, in which he referred indirectly to the fate of Nicolas Fouquet, whose ambitions to imitate Louis XIV – The Sun King – brought about his downfall. This opera is also used in the second version of Paul Hindemith’s opera Cardillac (1952).
- Camille Saint-Saëns wrote a symphonic poem entitled Phaéton in 1873.
- Niccolò Jommelli wrote an opera Fetonte to an Italian-language libretto by Mattia Verazi using various sources, principally Ovid, for the myth of Phaeton. It was first performed at the Ducal Theatre, Ludwigsburg in February, 1768, where Duke Karl-Eugen of Württemberg maintained an opera troupe.
- Wilhelm Waiblinger’s epistolary novel Phaëthon amalgamates the Phaethon myth with Goethe’s Werther as well as Hölderlin’s Hyperion.
- Johann Wolfgang Goethe published a poetic reconstruction of Euripides’ fragmented tragedy in Kunst und Altertum (1823), which served as a basis for various full-scale dramatic adaptations such as Marie Wernicke’s Phaethons Sturz (1893), Karl Wilhelm Geißler’s Phaëthon (1889) and Arnold Beer’s Phaeton (1875).
- Gerhart Hauptmann’s long poem Helios und Phaethon (1936) omits the cosmic disaster in order to focus on the relationship between godly father and mortal son.
- In Otakar Theer's symbolist tragedy Faëthón (1916), the hero epitomizes man's revolt against the world order ("the gods") and against human destiny. The tragedy was adapted in 1962 into a celebrated eponymous radio play by Miloslav Jareš (director) and Jaromír Ptáček (dramaturge).
- Paul Goodman’s early Phaëthon, Myth (1934) juxtaposes the Phaethon myth with a grotesque version of a Christological narrative.
- Benjamin Britten’s Six Metamorphoses after Ovid for oboe, first performed at the Aldeburgh Festival on 14 June 1951, include the short piece Phaeton, which as a solo piece seems to focus on the individual lost in space, rather than the furious effects emphasised by earlier instrumental renditions of the myth.
- In Ayn Rand's 1957 novel Atlas Shrugged, an in-universe opera is composed by the character of Richard Halley, where Phaeton succeeds in his attempt to control the chariot of the Sun, as an allegory for the power of mankind and individualism.
- Donald Cotton wrote a comedy radio play The Tragedy of Phaethon broadcast on BBC Network 3, 10 February 1965.
- Angus Wilson’s novel Setting the World on Fire (1980) opens with the description of a Phaethon painting which proves pivotal to the protagonist's emerging self-conception, leading up to his production of Lully’s Phaëton.
- John C. Wright's The Golden Oecumene trilogy (2002) features a protagonist named Phaethon, whose father's name is Helion. Mythical references abound.
- In 2002, Volkswagen introduced the VW Phaeton.
- In 2012, former Disco Inferno frontman Ian Crause adapted the story of Phaethon as The Song of Phaethon for his first musical release in over a decade. Crause used the story as an analogy for Britain's entry into the Second Gulf War.
- In 2016, Taffety Punk Theatre premiered Michael Milligan's play "Phaeton" in Washington, DC.
- In 2019, Carl Rütti set to music an early modern interpretation of Sebastian Brant's Phaethon story, which equates the fall of Phaethon with a solar eclipse, but has Phaethon survive and return triumphant. Two versions exist for male choir and mixed choir, the latter as part of Rütti's four-part solar eclipse cantata "Eklipsis".

== Shared name ==
The name "Phaethon", which means "Shining One", was given also to Phaethon of Syria, to one of the horses of Eos (the Dawn), the Sun, the constellation Auriga, and the planet Jupiter, while as an adjective it was used to describe the sun and the moon. In some accounts the planet referred to by this name is not Jupiter but Saturn.

When 1 Ceres and 2 Pallas – the first asteroids – were discovered, astronomer Heinrich Olbers suggested that they were fragments of a much larger hypothetical planet, which was later named Phaethon. However, the 'Phaeton hypothesis' has been superseded by the accretion model, in which the asteroid belt represented the remainder of the protoplanetary disk that never formed a planet, due to the interference of the gravity of Jupiter. However, fringe theorists still consider the Phaeton hypothesis likely.

In modern times, an asteroid whose orbit brings it close to the Sun has been named "3200 Phaethon" after the mythological Phaethon.

The French form of the name "Phaethon" is "Phaéton". This form of the word is applied to a kind of carriage and automobile.

An order, family, and genus of birds bear the name Phaethon in their taxonomic nomenclature, the tropicbirds.

== Genealogy ==
Gaia
Uranus
Hyperion	Theia	Oceanus	Tethys
Helios	Clymene
Phaethon

== See also ==
- Bellerophon
- Icarus
- Lucifer
- "Phaeton: The Chariot of Fire" episode

== Sources ==
=== Greek ===
- Euripides (2008). "Online version". In Collard, Christopher; Cropp, Martin (eds.). Fragments: Oedipus-Chrysippus: Other Fragments. Loeb Classical Library. Vol. 506. Cambridge, MA: Harvard University Press. ISBN 978-0-674-99631-1.
- Apollonius Rhodius, (1912). Argonautica translated by Robert Cooper Seaton (1853–1915), R.C. Loeb Classical Library Volume 1. London, UK: William Heinemann. Online version at the Topos Text Project.
- Diodorus Siculus, (1888–1890). Bibliotheca Historica. Vols 1–2. Immanel Bekker. Ludwig Dindorf. Friedrich Vogel. in aedibus B.G. Teubneri, Leipzig. Greek text available at the Perseus Digital Library.
- Tzetzes, John, (1826). Book of Histories, Books II–IV translated by Gary Berkowitz from the original Greek of T. Kiessling's edition. Online version at Theoi.com
- Philostratus the Elder, (1913). Imagines, translated by A. Fairbanks, Loeb Classical Library, No. 256. Harvard University Press, Cambridge, Massachusetts. 1931. Internet Archive
- Quintus Smyrnaeus, Quintus Smyrnaeus: The Fall of Troy, translated by A.S. Way, Cambridge, Massachusetts: Harvard University Press. Internet Archive.
- Nonnus, (1940). Dionysiaca; translated by Rouse, W.H.D., III Books XXXVI–XLVIII. Loeb Classical Library No. 346, Cambridge, Massachusetts, Harvard University Press; London, UK: William Heinemann. Internet Archive.
- Lucian, (1905). Dialogues of the Gods; translated by Fowler, H.W. and F.G. Oxford, UK: The Clarendon Press.
- Palaephatus, (1996). On Unbelievable Tales, translation, introduction and commentary by Jacob Stem, Bolchazy-Carducci Publishers, ISBN 0-86516-310-3. Google books
- Decharme, Paul, (1884). Mythologie de la Grèce antique, Garnier Frères. Google books (in French).
- Pausanias, (1918). Pausanias Description of Greece with an English Translation by W.H.S. Jones, Litt.D., and H.A. Ormerod, M.A., in 4 Volumes. Cambridge, MA: Harvard University Press; London, UK: William Heinemann. Online version at the Perseus Digital Library.
- Hesiod, (1914). Theogony, in The Homeric Hymns and Homerica with an English Translation by Hugh G. Evelyn-White, Cambridge, MA: Harvard University Press; London, UK: William Heinemann. Online version at the Perseus Digital Library.

=== Roman ===
- Ovid, (1977). Metamorphoses, Volume I: Books 1–8. Translated by Frank Justus Miller. Revised by G.P. Goold. Loeb Classical Library No. 42. Cambridge, Massachusetts: Harvard University Press, first published 1916. ISBN 978-0-674-99046-3. Online version at Harvard University Press.
- Gaius Julius Hyginus, Astronomica from The Myths of Hyginus translated and edited by Mary Grant. University of Kansas Publications in Humanistic Studies. Online version at the Topos Text Project.
- Maurus Servius Honoratus, (1881). In Vergilii carmina comentarii. Servii Grammatici qui feruntur in Vergilii carmina commentarii; recensuerunt Georgius Thilo et Hermannus Hagen. Georgius Thilo. Leipzig, DE: B.G. Teubner. Online version at the Perseus Digital Library.
- Vergil, (1910). Aeneid. trans. Theodore C. Williams. Boston, MA: Houghton Mifflin. Online version at the Perseus Digital Library.
- Gaius Julius Hyginus, Fabulae from the Myths of Hyginus translated and edited by Mary Grant. University of Kansas Publications in Humanistic Studies. Online version at the Topos Text Project.
- Marcus Tullius Cicero, (1878). 'Nature of the Gods' from the Treatises of M.T. Cicero translated by Charles Duke Yonge (1812–1891), Bohn edition. Online version at the Topos Text Project.
- Marcus Tullius Cicero, (1917). De Natura Deorum. O. Plasberg. Leipzig, DE: Teubner. Latin text available at the Perseus Digital Library.
- Pliny the Elder, (1938–1962). Pliny – Natural History, 10 volumes. Translated by Rackham, H.; Jones, W.H.S.; Eichholz, D.E. Loeb Classical Library.
- Seneca, (1917). Tragedies, translated by Miller, Frank Justus. Loeb Classical Library Volumes. Cambridge, Massachusetts: Harvard University Press; London, UK: William Heinemann.
- Hyginus, Gaius Julius, (1960). The Myths of Hyginus, Book 1. Edited and translated by Mary A. Grant, Lawrence: University of Kansas Press.
- Valerius Flaccus, (1928). Argonautica translated by Mozley, J.H. Loeb Classical Library Volume 286. Cambridge, MA: Harvard University Press; London, UK: William Heinemann. Online version at Theoi.com.

=== Secondary ===
- Beekes, Robert S. P. (2009). Etymological Dictionary of Greek. Leiden: Brill.
- Cook, A.B. (1914). Zeus: A study in ancient religion. Vol. I "Zeus God of the Bright Sky". Cambridge University Press – via Internet Archive (archive.org).
- Causey, Faya (2011). Amber and the Ancient World. Getty Publications. ISBN 978-1-60606-082-7.
- Euripides (1970). Diggle, J. (ed.). Euripides: Phaethon. Cambridge Classical Texts and Commentaries. Vol. 12. Cambridge University Press. ISBN 978-0521604246.
- Falkner, David E. (2011). "The Winter Constellations". The Mythology of the Night Sky: An amateur astronomer's guide to the ancient Greek and Roman legends. Springer Science+Business Media. p. 41. ISBN 978-1-4614-0137-7 – via Google Books.
- Fontenrose, Joseph Eddy (1968). "The Gods Invoked in Epic Oaths: Aeneid, XII, 175-215". The American Journal of Philology. 89 (1): 20–38. doi:10.2307/293372. JSTOR 293372.
- Gantz, T. (1996). Early Greek Myth: A guide to literary and artistic sources. Baltimore, MD: Johns Hopkins University Press; in two volumes: (Vol. 1) ISBN 978-0-8018-5360-9; (Vol. 2) ISBN 978-0-8018-5362-3.
- Grimal, Pierre (1996). The Dictionary of Classical Mythology. Wiley-Blackwell. ISBN 978-0-631-20102-1.
- MacDonald Kirkwood, Gordon (2000). A Short Guide to Classical Mythology. Cornell University, Bolchazy-Carducci Publishers, Inc. ISBN 0-86516-309-X.
- Marshall, Hallie; Marshall, C.W. (2020). Greek Drama V: Studies in the theatre of the fifth and fourth centuries BCE. Bloomsbury Academic. ISBN 978-1-3501-4235-0.
- Norton, Elizabeth (2013). Aspects of Ecphrastic Technique in Ovid's Metamorphoses. Cambridge Scholars Publishing. ISBN 978-1-4438-4271-6.
- The Vatican Mythographers, Ronald E. Pepin (2008), Fordham University Press, ISBN 978-0-8232-2892-8.
- Smith, W. (1873). Dictionary of Greek and Roman Biography and Mythology. London, UK.
