= Neaera (consort of Helios) =

Nymph in Greek mythology, loved by Helios

In Greek mythology, Neaera (/niˈɪərə/; Ancient Greek: Νέαιρα, Néaira), also Neaira (/niˈaɪrə/), is the name of a minor goddess, a lover of Helios the god of the sun and the mother by him of the girls Phaethusa and Lampetia.

== Mythology ==
In the Odyssey, Circe informs Odysseus that after Neaera bore and nursed her daughters, she sent them to the island of Thrinacia, the island where Helios kept his sacred cows, to tend to the flocks of their father. Homer calls her "divine" without giving her any parentage; Hesychius of Alexandria wrote that 'Neaera' is the name of an Oceanid nymph, though it is not clear whether this Neaera is the same person.

Neaera's name, roughly meaning "younger", relates to Helios, as do the names of their daughters, since the sun is new and young each morning, adding to the symbolism of the Oxen of the Sun episode.

== See also ==
- Rhodos
- Perse
- Clymene
