= 296 Phaëtusa =

Main-belt asteroid

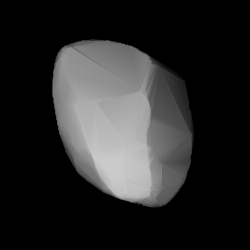
- Modelled shape of Phaëtusa from its lightcurve

Discovery
- Discovered by: Auguste Charlois
- Discovery date: 19 August 1890

Designations
- Pronunciation: /feɪ.əˈtjuːsə/
- Named after: Phaethusa
- Alternative designations: A890 QB; A917 XB; 1930 YH
- Minor planet category: Main belt

Orbital characteristics
- Epoch 31 July 2016 (JD 2457600.5)
- Uncertainty parameter 0
- Observation arc: 105.57 yr (38560 d)
- Aphelion: 2.58602 AU (386.863 Gm)
- Perihelion: 1.87155 AU (279.980 Gm)
- Semi-major axis: 2.22879 AU (333.422 Gm)
- Eccentricity: 0.16028
- Orbital period (sidereal): 3.327442 yr (1215.348 d)
- Average orbital speed: 19.95 km/s
- Mean anomaly: 272.510°
- Mean motion: 0° 17^{m} 46.586^{s} / day
- Inclination: 1.74838°
- Longitude of ascending node: 121.548°
- Argument of perihelion: 252.449°

Physical characteristics
- Mean diameter: 8.196±0.100 km
- Synodic rotation period: 4.5385 h (0.18910 d)
- Geometric albedo: 0.379±0.046 (geometric)
- Spectral type: B–V = 0.887±0.013; U−B = 0.463±0.051
- Absolute magnitude (H): 12.53

296 Phaëtusa is a small Main belt asteroid. It was discovered by Auguste Charlois on 19 August 1890 in Nice.

== Discovery ==
Phaëtusa was discovered on 19 August 1890 by Charlois A. at Nice.

== Observations ==
The observation arc of Phaëtusa began on 7 September 1920 and was last observed on 4 April 2026. Giving it a long observation arc of 106 years. In these 106 years, Phaëtusa has been observed 7820 times.

== Orbit ==
Phaëtusa is a main belt asteroid that orbits the Sun at a distance of 1.872–2.586 astronomical units (AU) with a semi-major axis or average orbital distance of 2.229 AU once every 3.33 years (for reference, Ceres's orbit is at 2.77 AU).

Phaëtusa's orbit has an eccentricity of 0.1603 and an inclination of 1.748° with respect to the ecliptic.

== Physical characteristics ==
Phaëtusa has a diameter of approximately 8.196±0.100 km, its geometric albedo is 0.379±0.046. Phaëtusa rotates on its axis once every 4.5385 hours. The B-V color index of Phaëtusa is 0.887±0.013.
