= Eridanos (geology) =

River that flowed where the Baltic Sea is now

The Eridanos river system, projected on the map of the present European continent (text in Dutch)

Eridanos (/əˈrɪdəˌnɒs/) was an ancient river which once flowed through the current Baltic Sea. Its river system is also known as the "Baltic River System".

== Etymology ==
Eridanos (Ancient Greek: Ἠριδανός) is a mythonymic toponym given by geologists in honor of the Ancient Greek mythological river of the same name.

== Geology ==
The formation of the Eridanos began about 40 million years ago in the Eocene. By about 12 million years ago in the Miocene, the Eridanos had reached the area currently occupied by the North Sea, where sediments carried by the river built an immense delta. The Eridanos disappeared in the early Middle Pleistocene, about 1 million years ago, when the Ice Age glaciers excavated the Baltic Sea bed.

The Neogene uplift of the South Swedish Dome deflected the Eridanos river from its original path across south-central Sweden into a course south of Sweden in the Pliocene.

The geological Eridanos was most important during the Baventian Stage about two million years ago in the late early Pleistocene, when it was about 2,700 kilometres (1,700 mi) long, a little shorter than the modern Danube. It began in Lapland, and then flowed through the area of the modern-day Gulf of Bothnia and Baltic Sea to western Europe, where it had an immense delta, which, it is reckoned, was comparable in size to that of the current-day Amazon River.

Eridanos deposits in the Netherlands dating from the late Early Pleistocene Menapian glacial stage show the presence of Scandinavian erratic boulders ("Hattem Layers"). These erratics are supposed to be transported by fluvial drift ice and are the first indicators in this part of the North Sea Basin of a major glaciation in the Scandinavian mountains. Most probably the reshaping of the Eridanos source areas in the Scandinavian mountains had already started during this glacial stage. During the succeeding Bavel Interglacial the fluvial system reached its largest size, but sedimentation rates already dropped at that time. The repeated buildup of the Scandinavian ice cap during successive ice ages after this interglacial resulted in a complete destruction of the source area, decapitating the fluvial system, and in the birth of a glacially excavated area surrounding the Scandinavian mountainous areas, in which region the Baltic Sea would later come into existence. During the first glacial stage of the Cromerian Complex, about 0.7 Ma ago, sedimentation in the Netherlands of the Baltic River System came to an end, indicating the end of the Eridanos.

Remnants of the Eridanos are found all through northern Europe, from the current North Sea and the Netherlands at its western end to sediments in northern Lapland.

Eridanos sediments in the Netherlands and the neighbouring North Sea can be recognized by a high content of transparent blue-grey, lightgrey, and colorless quartz in the sand, as well as in the gravel fractions. The color of the mainly coarse sands is grey-white, and in the Netherlands these deposits are, therefore, known as the White Sands ("Witte Zanden"). During the Early Pleistocene in the Netherlands fluvial deposits of eastern provenance mix with fluvial deposits of the river Rhine. At that time the Rhine was far less important than the Eridanos. Sediment mixing can be recognized by the presence of a high proportion of "milky quartz" that is highly characteristic of sands and gravels deposited by the river Rhine. After the disappearance of the Eridanos, the river Rhine is left as the most important river in this part of the North Sea Basin.
