= Eridanos (mythological river) =

River mentioned in Greek mythology

In Greek mythology, the Eridanos /əˈrɪdəˌnɒs/ or Eridanus (/əˈrɪdənəs/; Ancient Greek: Ἠριδανός) is a river. Eridanus is also the name of the river god associated with this stream.

== Mythical stream ==
Hesiod, in the Theogony, calls it "deep-eddying Eridanos" in his list of rivers, the offspring of the Titans Tethys and her brother-husband Oceanus. He was called the king of the rivers.

Herodotus suspects the word Eridanos to be essentially Greek in character, and notably forged by some unknown poet, and expresses his disbelief in the whole concept—passed on to him by others, themselves not eye-witnesses—of such a river flowing into a northern sea, surrounding Europe, where the mythical Amber and Tin Isles were supposed; he upholds the belief in the abundance of natural goods at the world's ends though, to be found in the north of Europe as well as in India (east: big animals, gold, cotton) and Arabia (south: incense, myrrh, etc.). The Eridanos was later associated with the river Po, because the Po was located near the end of the Amber Trail.

According to Apollonius of Rhodes, Euripides, and Ovid, amber originated from the tears of the Heliades, encased in poplars as dryads, shed when their brother, Phaethon, died and fell from the sky, struck by Zeus' thunderbolt, and tumbled into the Eridanos, where "to this very day the marsh exhales a heavy vapour which rises from his smouldering wound; no bird can stretch out its fragile wings to fly over that water, but in mid-flight it falls dead in the flames"; "along the green banks of the river Eridanos," Cygnus mourned him—Ovid told—and was transformed into a swan. There in the far west, Heracles asked the river nymphs of Eridanos to help him locate the Garden of the Hesperides. Strabo commented disregardingly on such mythmaking:

[...] one must put aside many of the mythical or false accounts such as those of Phaethon and of the Heliades changed into black poplars near the Eridanos (a river that does not exist anywhere on earth, although it is said to be near the Po), and of the Islands of Amber that lie off the Po, and of the guinea-fowl on them, because none of these exist in this area. [...] τὰ δὲ πολλὰ τῶν μυθευομένων ἢ κατεψευσμένων ἄλλως ἐᾶν δεῖ͵ οἷον τὰ περὶ Φαέθοντα καὶ τὰς Ἡλιάδας τὰς ἀπαιγειρουμένας περὶ τὸν Ἠριδανόν͵ τὸν μηδαμοῦ γῆς ὄντα͵ πλησίον δὲ τοῦ Πάδου λεγόμενον͵ καὶ τὰς Ἠλεκτρίδας νήσους τὰς πρὸ τοῦ Πάδου καὶ μελεαγρίδας ἐν αὐταῖς· οὐδὲ γὰρ τούτων οὐδέν ἐστιν ἐν τοῖς τόποις.

Euripides' tragedy Hippolytus likewise connects the Eridanos (the place where Phaethon's sisters in tree form mourn their brother with amber tears) with the Garden of the Hesperides, when the chorus imagines venturing to these places at the ends of the known world to escape Phaedra's impending suicide.

Virgil introduced it as one of the rivers of Hades in his Aeneid.

=== "Starry Eridanus" ===
When in Nonnus' fourth- or fifth-century CE Dionysiaca the vast monster Typhon boasts that he will bathe in "starry Eridanus", it is hyperbole, for the constellation Eridanus, represented as a river, was one of the 48 constellations listed by the second-century astronomer Ptolemy; it remains one of the 88 modern constellations.

== Real river ==
There have been various guesses at which real river was the Eridanos: these include the Po River in north Italy, the Rhone in France, and the Rhine. The Eridanos is mentioned in Greek writings as a river in northern Europe rich in amber (Vistula on Amber Road?). A small river near Athens was named Eridanos in ancient times, and has been rediscovered with the excavations for construction of the Athens Metro.There were no serious scientific works that would investigate the connection of Eridanus with the Balkan hydronym for the river Drina, although such studies would be necessary, bearing in mind the proximity of the Lower Danube to ancient trade centers on the Mediterranean, as well as the archaeologically increasingly confirmed importance of this area in ancient and pre-antique history.

An ancient river that no-longer exists has been given the name Eridanos in honor of the mythological river.
