= Clymene (mother of Phaethon) =

Consort of Helios and mother of Phaethon from Greek mythology

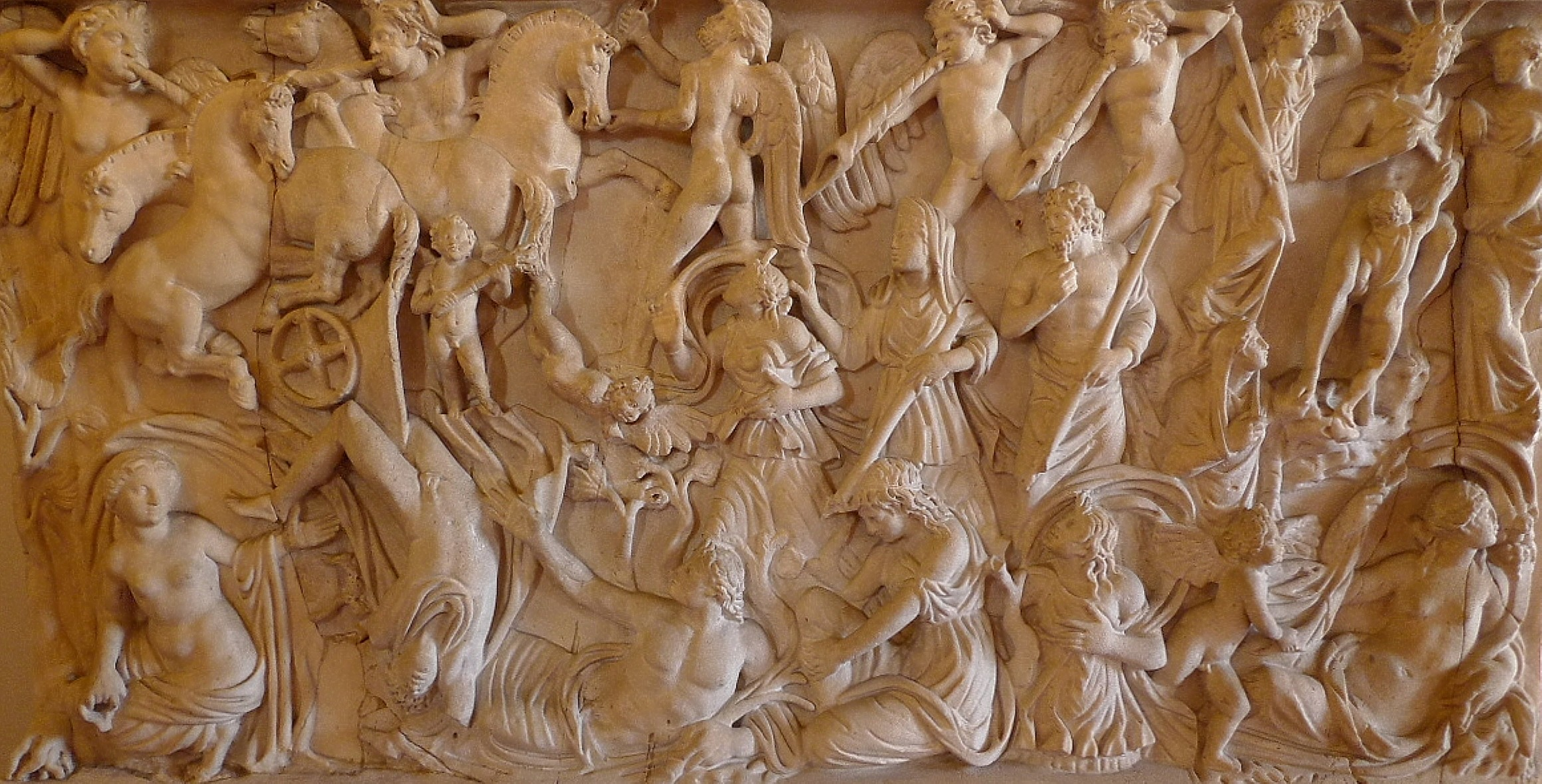
- A woman, perhaps Clymene, leaning against Helios (far right) in a Phaethon sarcophagus
- Other names: Merope
- Abode: Aethiopia

Genealogy
- Parents: Oceanus and Tethys
- Siblings: the Oceanids, the river gods
- Consort: Helios, Merops
- Children: Phaethon, the Heliades, Astris

In Greek and Roman mythology, Clymene or Klymene (Note: Ancient Greek: Κλυμένη, romanized: Kluménē, lit. 'fame'; feminine form of Κλύμενος; /ˈklɪmɪniː, ˈklaɪ-/, KLIM-ə-nee or KLY-mə-nee) is an Oceanid nymph who was loved by the sun-god Helios and became the mother by him of Phaethon and the Heliades. In most versions, Clymene is the one to reveal to Phaethon his divine parentage and encourage him to seek out his father, and even drive his solar chariot to catastrophic results.

== Etymology ==
The Greek proper name Κλυμένη (Kluménē) is the feminine form of Κλύμενος (Klúmenos), meaning "famous". In turn, κλύμενος derives from the verb κλύω, meaning 'to hear, to understand', itself from the Proto-Indo-European root *ḱlew-, which means 'to hear'. It thus shares the same root and meaning as "Clytie", another Oceanid nymph whom Helios loved.

== Family ==
Clymene is one of the three thousand Oceanid nymph daughters of the Titans Oceanus and Tethys. Although she shares name and parentage with Clymene, the wife of Iapetus, who is also a daughter of Oceanus and Tethys (and thus one of her sisters), she is nevertheless distinguished from her.

In another version, attributed to the pseudo-Hesiodic work Catalogue of Women, Clymene is the mortal daughter of Minyas, who married Helios and had Phaethon by him. Alternatively, she married Phylacus, the son of Deion, and bore him Iphiclus, a very swift son.

Byzantine writer John Tzetzes recorded an alternative genealogy where Clymene is the mother of a boy named Phaethon by Helios, but not the Phaethon who drove his father's chariot (who is instead the son of a woman named Prote).

== Mythology ==
=== Euripides' account ===
Euripides wrote a version of Phaethon's story that does not survive in full. In Euripides' version of the tale, Clymene was given as wife to Merops, the king of Aethiopia, as a bride. Although everyone assumes that Merops is the father of her son Phaethon, his father is really Helios. In the words of Strabo:

And Euripides in his Phaeton says that Clymene was given

“To Merops, sovereign of that land,
Which from his four-horsed chariot first
The rising sun strikes with his golden rays;
And which its swarthy neighbours call
The radiant stable of the Morn and Sun.”

Here the poet merely describes them as the common stables of the Morning and of the Sun; but further on he tells us they were near to the dwellings of Merops, and in fact the whole plot of the piece has reference to this.

According to the hypothesis, Clymene revealed to her son Phaethon that he was the child of Helios, rather than her husband Merops. It has been suggested that Clymene made this revelation to Phaethon in order to overcome his reluctance to get married; the greatest problem of the fragmentary plot is to confirm the identity of Phaethon's bride. Henri Weil suggested it is one of Phaethon's half-sisters, the Heliades, and James Diggle noted that while this suggestion is unprovable, he is convinced that it is correct.

After Phaethon's disastrous ride, near the end Clymene mourns her son, and orders slave girls to bring Phaethon's dead, still smoking body in the palace and hide it from Merops, while lamenting Helios' role in his demise. Plutarch reports that she mourned her son's death saying:

My best beloved, but now he lies
And putrefies in some dark vale.

Another fragment, of uncertain position in the play, also preserved by Plutarch, has Clymene state she loathes the handy horned bow, and youths' pastime exercises, as they remind her of her son.

Near the end, Merops, now knowing the truth about his supposed son's parentage, tries to retaliate against Clymene by killing her as the chorus tells Clymene to plead with her father Oceanus to save her from perishing; it is unclear whether Clymene survives thanks to an ex machina intervention by a god, as well as that god's exact identity, whether it is Oceanus indeed trying to save his daughter, Helios or even Athena.

=== Ovid's account ===
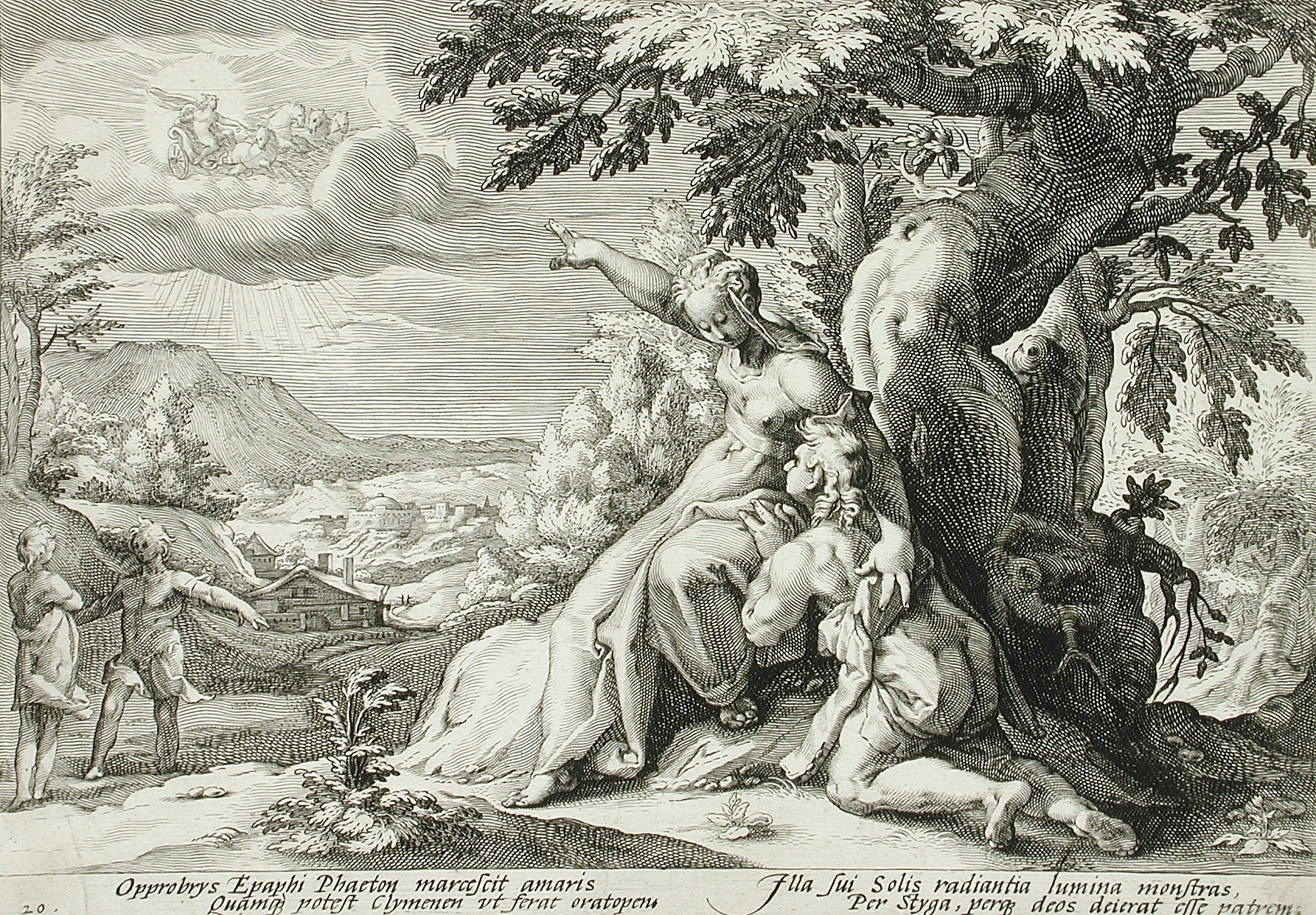
Clymene urging Phaethon, 1589 engraving.

Like Euripides's version of the story, in Ovid's Clymene is the wife of Merops and also the mother of Phaethon and the Heliades by Helios. Phaethon is proud to be the son of the sun god, but his claim is mocked and questioned by his friend Epaphus, the son of Zeus and Io. Phaethon asks for confirmation of his parentage from his mother, who tells him to seek for Helios himself.

By that brightness marked out by glittering rays, that sees us and hears us, I swear to you, my son, that you are the child of the Sun; of that being you see; you are the child of he who governs the world; if I lie, may he himself decline to look on me again, and may this be the last light to reach our eyes! It is no great effort for you yourself to find your father’s house. The place he rises from is near our land. If you have it in mind to do so, go and ask the sun himself!

Phaethon follows his mother's advice and travels east, past Aethiopia and India, to meet Helios. His father warmly receives him, confirming his parentage, and Phaethon asks as a favour to drive Helios' chariot for one day, and Helios, not being able to go back on his word he swore on the river Styx, agrees. The results are catastrophic; the earth burns when Phaethon drives too close to it, and freezes when he drives too high. Zeus, wanting to save the world, strikes Phaethon with a thunderbolt, killing him. Clymene, in deep grief, searches out to find her son's body, or at the very least his bones, only to find out he has already been buried by the Eridanus, the river he fell into. When her daughters begin to transform into black poplar trees, they call out to her for help, and though Clymene tries to free them by breaking off the branches, she ultimately fails, and the transformation is completed.

Sometime later, after Aphrodite cursed Helios to fall in love with the mortal princess Leucothoe, he is said to have forgotten all his previous lovers, Clymene included.

=== Nonnus' account ===
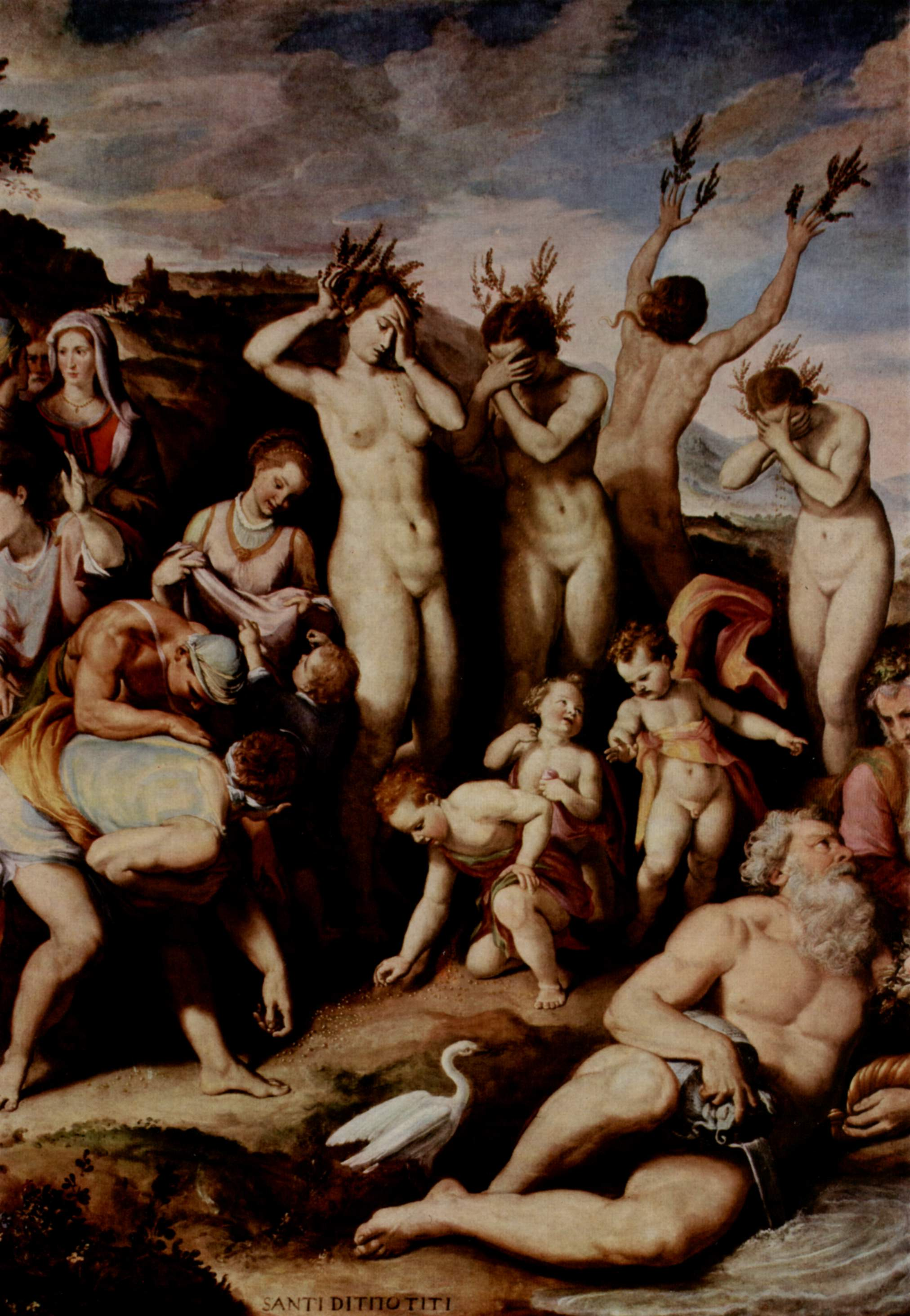
The Sisters of Phaethon are Transformed into Poplars by Santi di Tito, 16th century.

In Nonnus' version of the story, Helios and Clymene fell in love with each other and got married, with the blessing of Clymene's father Oceanus. Their wedding was attended by the Horae, Naiad nymphs who danced around, the lights of the sky such as Helios' sister Selene and Eosphorus (the planet Venus), the Hesperides, and Clymene's family.

For her beauty Helios pined, Helios who spins round the twelvemonth lichtgang, and travels the sevenzone circuit garland-wise — Helios dispenser of fire was afflicted with another fire! The torch of love was stronger than the blaze of his car and the shining of his rays, when over the bend of the reddened Ocean as he bathed his fiery form in the eastern waters, he beheld the maiden close by the way, while she swam naked and sported in her father's waves.

Soon, Clymene fell pregnant and a son was born to the couple, whom Helios named Phaethon ("shining") after himself. When the boy grew up, he kept pestering his father to let him drive his chariot for one day; Clymene joined her son in that, until eventually Helios gave in and gave his chariot to Phaethon, with horrifying results. Clymene watched with joy and pride as Phaethon climbed his father's chariot.

Nonnus also made Clymene the mother of Helios' daughter Astris (who is not counted among the Heliades), although elsewhere Nonnus names another Oceanid, Ceto, as Astris' mother.

=== Other authors ===
Hyginus records another version of Phaethon's parentage, which he attributes to Hesiod; according to him, Phaethon was the son of an Oceanid named Merope and Clymenus (a reversal of the usual names Merops and Clymene), who is the son of Helios by an unnamed mother, thus making Helios and Phaethon grandfather and grandson. The attribution to Hesiod however is highly contested, and mostly doubted.

In his Dialogues of the Gods, the satirical writer Lucian of Samosata mentions that Clymene along with Phaethon pressured Helios to lend his chariot to the boy, and that sometimes Helios lingers with Clymene, forgetting to drive his chariot. A passage from Greek anthology also mentions Helios visiting Clymene in her room.

Other authors that make Clymene the mother of Phaethon include Hyginus and Servius.

== Legacy ==
The Themistian asteroid 104 Klymene was named after the many women called Clymene in Greek mythology, Phaethon's mother included.

== Genealogy ==
Clymene's family tree

Uranus
Oceanus	Tethys
CLYMENE
Heliades

Gaia
Hyperion	Theia
Helios
Phaethon

== See also ==
- Rhodos
- Perse
- Semele
