= Cattle of Helios =

In Greek mythology, cattle owned by the sun god

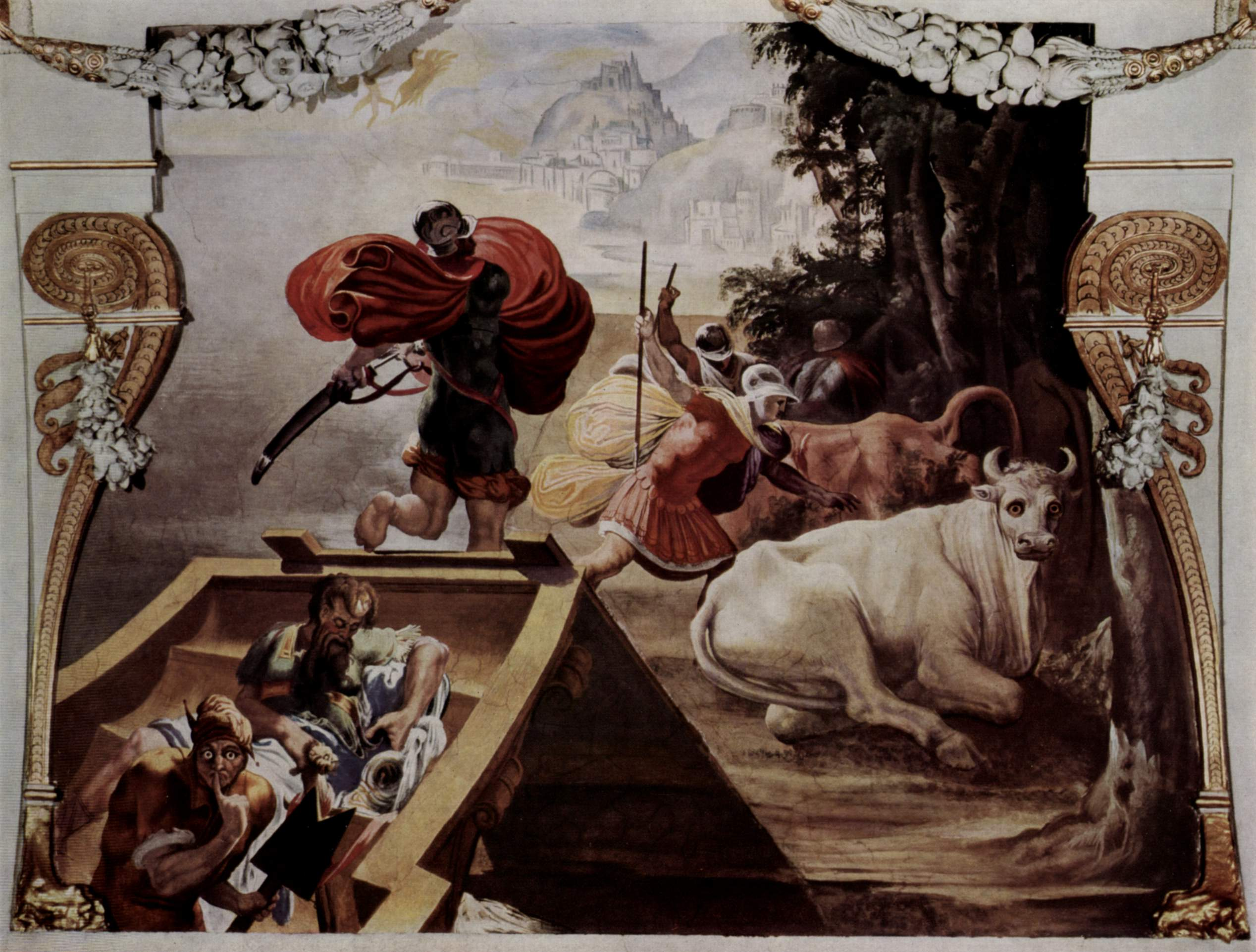
The Companions of Odysseus Steal the Cattle of Helios (fresco by Pellegrino Tibaldi, 1554/56)

In Greek mythology, the Cattle of Helios (Greek: Ἠελίοιο βόες, romanized: Ēelíoio bóes), also called the Oxen of the Sun, are cattle pastured on the island of Thrinacia, or Thrinakia (in later sources identified with Sicily).

== Mythology ==
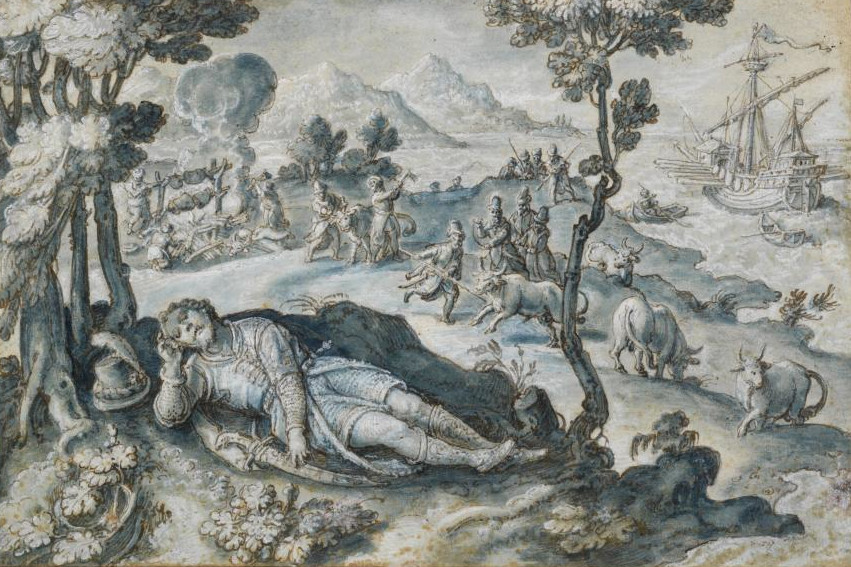
Odysseus sleeps while his men slaughter the cattle (Stradanus, 1600s)

Helios, who in Greek mythology is the god of the Sun, is said to have had seven herds of oxen and seven flocks of sheep, each numbering fifty head. In the Odyssey, Homer describes these immortal cattle as handsome (ἄριστος), wide-browed (εὐρυμέτωπος), fat, and straight-horned (ὀρθόκραιρος). The cattle were guarded by Helios's daughters, Phaëthusa and Lampetië, and it was known by all that any harm to any single animal was sure to bring down the wrath of the god.

Tiresias and Circe both warn Odysseus to shun the isle of Helios (Thrinacia). Odysseus and his crew arrive at Thrinacia after passing Scylla and Charybdis. When Eurylochus begs to be allowed to land to prepare supper, Odysseus grudgingly agrees on condition that the crew swear that if they come upon a herd of cattle or a great flock of sheep, no one will kill any of them. They are held on the isle for a month by an unfavorable storm sent by Poseidon.

When Odysseus goes up the island to pray to the gods and ask for extra help, Eurylochus convinces the crew to drive off the best of the cattle of Helios and sacrifice them to the gods: "if he be somewhat wroth for his cattle with straight horns, and is fain to wreck our ship, and the other gods follow his desire, rather with one gulp at the wave would I cast my life away, than be slowly straitened to death in a desert isle." When he returns to the ship, Odysseus rebukes his companions for disobeying his orders. But it is too late; the cattle are dead and gone.

Lampetië tells Helios that Odysseus's men have slain his cattle. In turn, Helios orders the gods to take vengeance on Odysseus's men. He threatens that if they do not pay him full atonement for the cattle, he will take the sun to the Underworld and shine it among the dead. Zeus promises Helios to smite their ship with a lightning bolt and cleave it in pieces in the midst of the ocean.

Soon the gods show signs and wonders to Odysseus's men. The skins begin creeping and the flesh bellowing upon the spits, both the roast and raw, and there is a sound like the voice of cattle. For six days, Odysseus's company feast on the kine of Helios. On the seventh day, the wind changes. After they set sail, Zeus keeps his word and the ship is destroyed by lightning during a storm and all of his men die. Odysseus escapes by swimming to Calypso's island. Odysseus is spared but, as forewarned by Circe and Tiresias, is himself punished when his return to Ithaca is delayed by a seven-year sojourn on Ogygia.

== Thrinacia ==
Thrinacia (Homeric Greek Θρινακία Thrinakíā, from θρῖναξ "trident"; English pronunciation /θrɪˈneɪʃə, θraɪ-/) is the island home of the Cattle of Helios in Book XII of Homer's Odyssey, guarded by Helios's daughters Lampetia and Phaethusa, born to him by Neaera. Homeric Thrinacia was later identified with Sicily, and its name re-interpreted as Trinakria (Τρινακρία, from τρεῖς and ἄκραι, as "[island] with three headlands").

In the Argonautica of Apollonius Rhodius, the sailors pass by the island of Thrinacia and see the daughters tending the sheep and cattle of Helios, “not one of them was dark in hue but all were white as milk and glorying in their horns of gold.”

== See also ==
- Archimedes's cattle problem
