= Heliades =

Daughters of Helios in Greek mythology

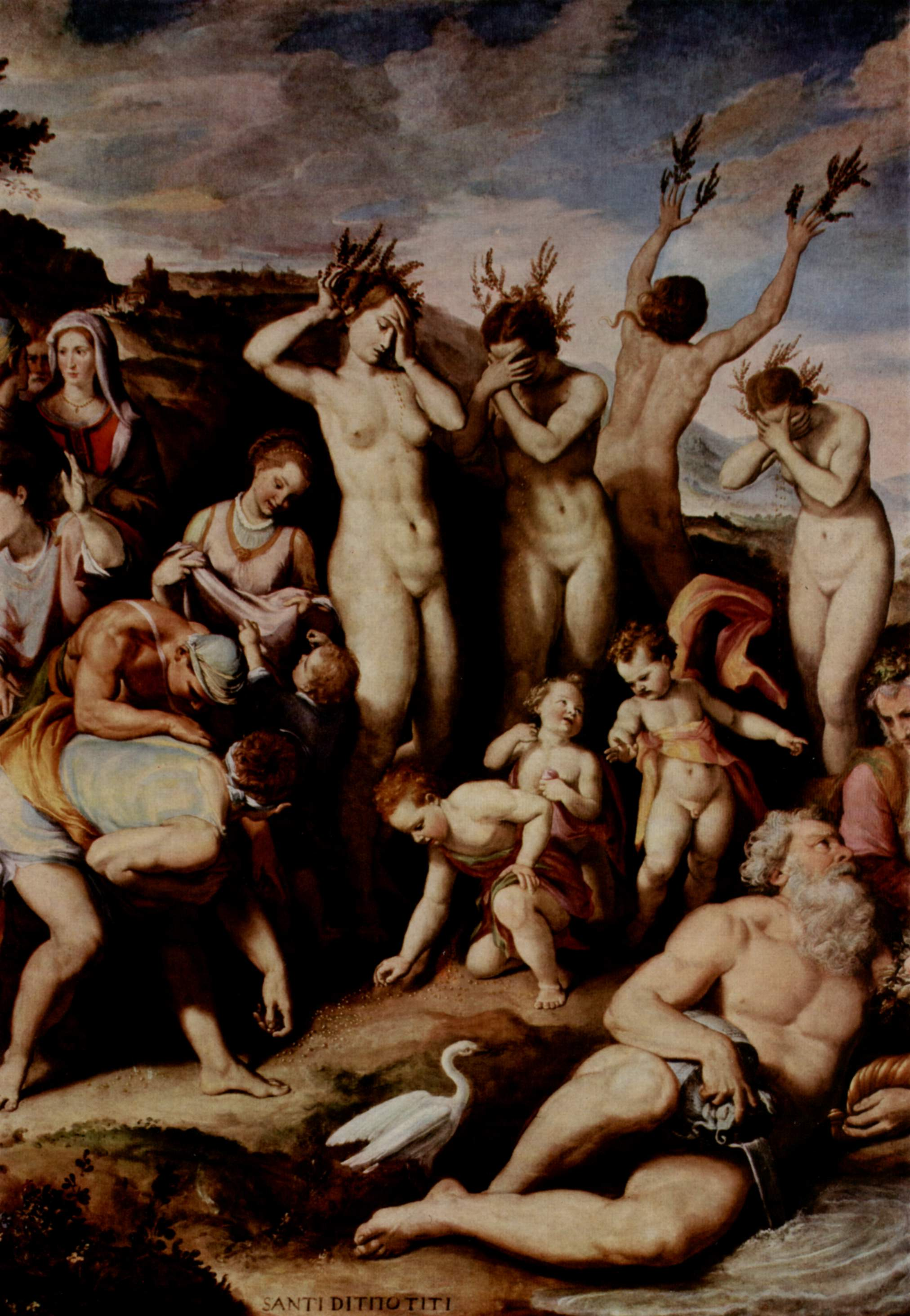
The Sisters of Phaeton Transformed into Poplars by Santi di Tito (2nd half of 16th century)

In Greek mythology, the Heliades (Ancient Greek: Ἡλιάδες, lit. 'daughters of the sun'; /hiːˈlaɪ.ədiːz/, hee-LYE-ə-deez) were the daughters of Helios and Clymene, an Oceanid nymph. They were also called Phaethontides (Ancient Greek: Φαεθοντίδες, lit. 'daughters of Phaethon'), due to "Phaethon" being a common epithet for Helios.

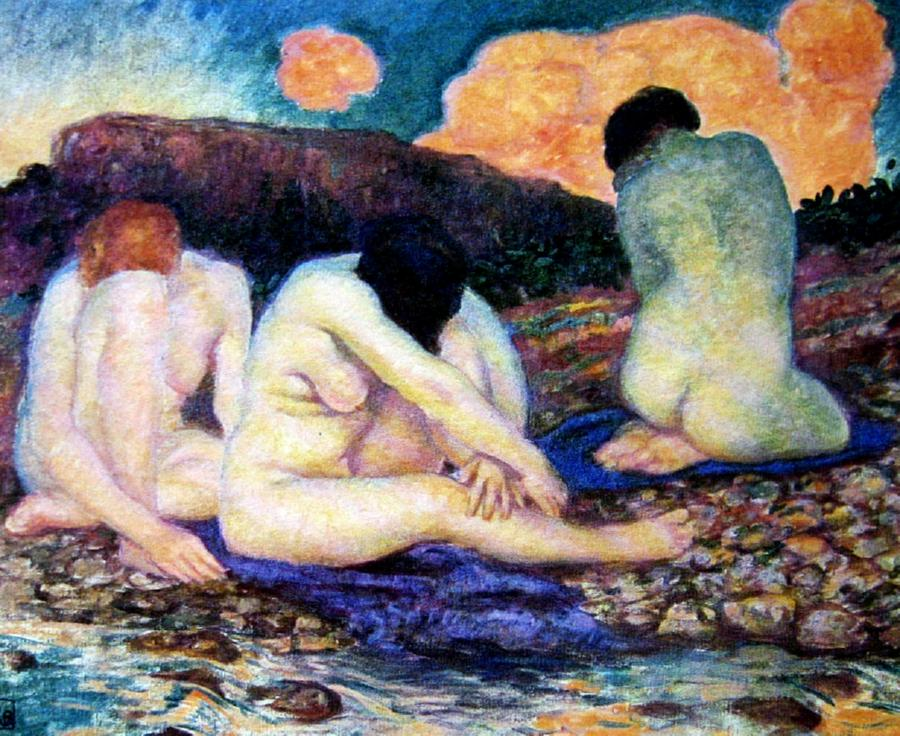
Heliades by Rupert Bunny, 1920s

== Names ==
According to one version recorded by Hyginus, there were seven Heliades: Merope, Helia, Aegle, Lampetia, Phoebe, Aetherie and Dioxippe. Aeschylus's fragmentary Heliades names Phaethousa and Lampetia, who are otherwise called daughters of Neaera and have a different role in myth, being in charge of their father's sheep and cattle. A scholiast on the Odyssey gives their names as Phaethusa (Φαέθουσα), Lampetia (Λαμπετίην) and Aegle (Αἴγλην).

== Mythology ==
Their brother, Phaëthon, died after attempting to drive his father's chariot (Helios the sun) across the sky. He was unable to control the horses and fell to his death (according to most accounts, Zeus struck his chariot with a thunderbolt to save the Earth from being set afire). The Heliades grieved enormously, and through this grief they turned themselves into poplar trees, and as they kept crying, their tears turned into amber. According to some sources, their tears (amber) fell into the river Eridanus, in which Phaethon had fallen.

According to one of the two versions by Hyginus, the Heliades were turned to poplar trees because they yoked the chariot for their brother without their father Helios' permission.

A proverb preserved in Plutarch associates the tears of the Heliades with great wealth.
