= Henri Weil =

French classical philologist (1818–1909)

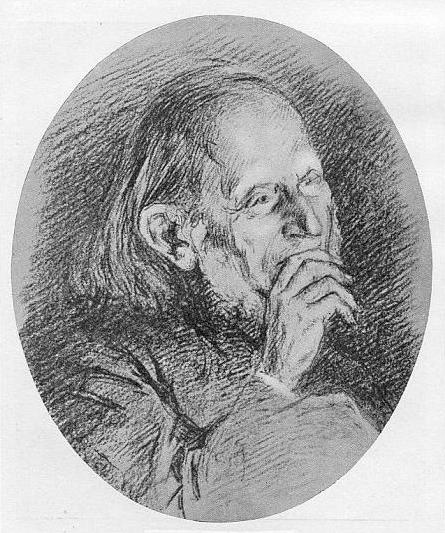
Henri Weil

Henri Weil (August 27, 1818 – November 5, 1909) was a French philologist.

== Biography ==
Born to a Jewish family in Frankfurt, he was educated at the universities of Bonn, Berlin, and Leipzig. He went to France, and continued his studies at Paris, graduating as Docteur ès lettres in 1845, and becoming "agrégé" in 1848. Appointed professor of ancient literature at the University of Besançon, he was in 1872 elected dean of the faculty. In 1876 he was called to Paris to fill a vacancy as instructor at the École Normale Supérieure and to assume charge of the École Pratique des Hautes Études, both of which positions he resigned in 1891. In 1866 he was elected corresponding member of the Académie des Inscriptions et Belles-Lettres, becoming full member in 1882 as the successor of Édouard Dulaurier. In 1887 he received the cross of the Legion of Honor.

He died in Paris.

Weil edited the poems of Aeschylus, eight tragedies of Euripides, and the orations of Demosthenes. Among his works may be mentioned: De l'Ordre des Mots dans les Langues Anciennes Comparées aux Langues Modernes (Paris, 1844; 3d ed. 1879); De Tragædiarum Græcarum cum Rebus Publicis Conjunctione (with L. Beuloew, Paris and Berlin, 1845); Théorie Générale de l'Accentuation Latine (ib. 1855); and Etudes sur le Drame Antique (ib. 1897).

== Bibliography ==
- Curinier, Dict. Nat. i. 142
- La Grande Encyclopédie
