= Dioxippe =

Dioxippe (Ancient Greek: Διωξίππη, romanized: Diōxíppē, lit. 'she who drives away horses' or 'horse-chaser') is a name in Greek mythology that may refer to:

- Dioxippe, one of the Heliades.
- Dioxippe, one of the 50 Danaïdes as a daughter of King Danaus of Libya (and later Argos) and Pieria. On the orders of her father, she married and murdered her cousin–husband Aegyptus, namesake of his father King Aegyptus of Egypt and Gorgo.
- Dioxippe, an Amazon.
- Dioxippe, wife of Agenor and mother of Sipylus who killed her unwittingly.
- Dioxippe, one of Actaeon's dogs.
