= Baptism =

Christian rite of initiation into the Church

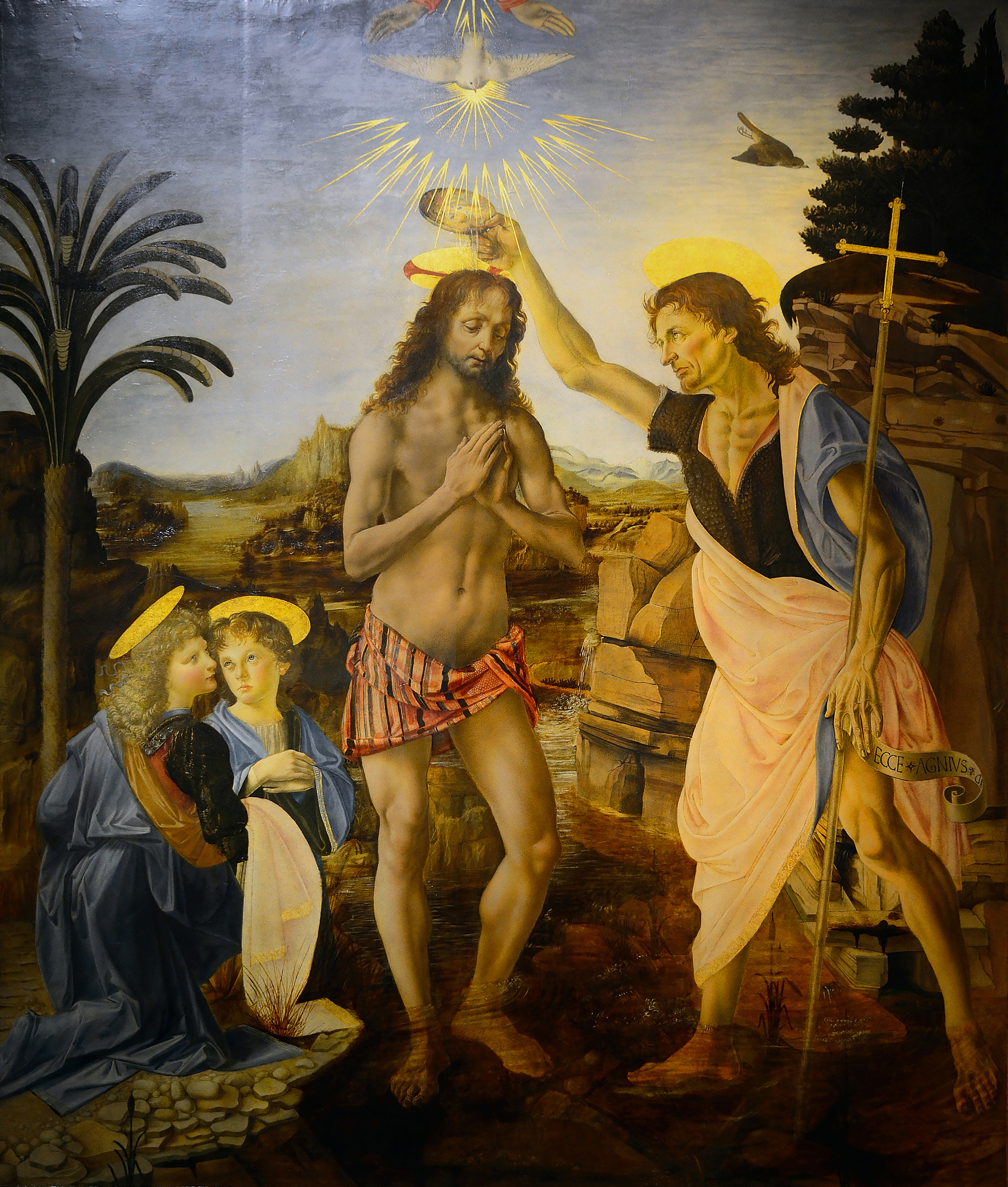
Verrochio's and Leonardo's depiction of the Baptism of Christ (c.1475).

Baptism (from Koine Greek: βάπτισμα, romanized: váptisma, lit. 'immersion, dipping in water') is a Christian rite of initiation almost invariably with the use of water. It may be performed by sprinkling or pouring water on the head, or immersing in water (partially or completely), traditionally three times for each person of the Trinity. It is also called christening, although this is typically reserved for the baptism of infants. Baptism is regarded as a sacrament in most churches and an ordinance in others. The synoptic Gospels recount that John the Baptist baptized Jesus.

Baptism according to the Trinitarian formula, which is done in most mainstream Christian denominations, is seen as being a basis for ecumenism, the concept of unity among Christians. In certain Christian denominations, such as the Catholic Church, Eastern Orthodox Church, Oriental Orthodox Churches, Assyrian Church of the East, and Lutheran churches, baptism is the door to church membership, with candidates taking baptismal vows. It has also given its name to the Baptist churches and denominations.

Certain schools of Christian thought (such as Catholic and Lutheran theology) regard baptism as necessary for salvation (though not without exception), but some writers, such as Huldrych Zwingli (1484–1531), have denied its necessity. Though water baptism is extremely common among Christian denominations, some, such as Quakers, some Unitarians (in particular Unitarian Universalists), and the Salvation Army, do not practice water baptism at all. Among denominations that practice baptism, differences occur in the manner and mode of baptizing and in the understanding of the significance of the rite. Most Christians baptize using the Trinitarian formula "in the name of the Father, and of the Son, and of the Holy Spirit" (following the Great Commission), but Oneness Pentecostals baptize using Jesus' name only. The majority of Christians baptize infants; (Note: As of 2010, out of a total of about 2,100,000,000 Christians, infant baptism is in use in the Catholic Church (1,100,000,000), the Eastern Orthodox Church (225,000,000), most of the 77,000,000 members of the Anglicanism, Lutherans, and others.) many others, such as Baptist churches, regard only believer's baptism as true baptism. In certain denominations, such as the Eastern and Oriental Orthodox Churches, the individual being baptized receives a cross necklace that is worn for the rest of their life, inspired by the Third Council of Constantinople.

There are three modes of baptism: sprinkling, affusion, and immersion, though the use of each mode varies by Christian denomination. A specific form of baptism by immersion, known as trine immersion consists of "the dipping of the candidate in the water three times-first, in the name of the Father, second, in the name of the Son, and, third, in the name of the Holy Spirit." In the present day, trine immersion is practiced by the River Brethren and Schwarzenau Brethren, as well as by parts of the Eastern Orthodox Church.

The term baptism has also been used metaphorically to refer to any ceremony, trial, or experience by which a person is initiated, purified, or given a name. Martyrdom was identified early in Christian church history as "baptism by blood", enabling the salvation of martyrs who had not been baptized by water. Later, the Catholic Church identified a baptism of desire, by which those preparing for baptism who die before actually receiving the sacrament are considered saved. In the Methodist tradition, baptism with the Holy Spirit, has referred to the second work of grace, entire sanctification; in Pentecostalism, baptism with the Holy Spirit is identified with speaking in tongues.

Outside of Christianity, Mandaeans undergo repeated baptism for purification instead of initiation. They consider John the Baptist to be their greatest prophet and name all rivers yardena after the Jordan River.

== Etymology ==
The English word baptism is derived indirectly through Latin from the neuter Greek concept noun báptisma (Greek βάπτισμα, 'washing, dipping'), (Note: βάπτισμα, βαπτισμός, βαπτίζω, βάπτω. Liddell, Henry George; Scott, Robert; A Greek–English Lexicon at the Perseus Project. "The several Greek words from which the English word baptism has been formed are used by Greek writers (in classical antiquity, in the Septuagint, and in the New Testament) with a great latitude of meaning, including "to make Christian" and "baptisma pyros (baptism of fire)"" — The University of Texas at Austin, College of Liberal Arts, Linguistics Research Center, Indo-European Lexicon, PIE (Proto-Indo-European) Etymon and IE (Indo-European) Reflexes: "baptism" and "baptize", Greek baptein, baptizein, baptos — New Advent, Catholic Encyclopedia: "Baptism": Etymology — Spirit Restoration, Theological Terms: A to B Dictionary: "baptize" (scroll down to "baptism") — Harper, Douglas R. "baptize". Online Etymology Dictionary. Lancaster, Pennsylvania: Author. OCLC 51773921. — International Standard Bible Encyclopedia: "baptism" — two parallel online sources, Search God's Word and Eliyah, for "Strong's numbers": Strong's Exhaustive Concordance of the Bible: Greek Lexicon 907 βαπτίζω "baptize" /907 baptizo "baptize", 908 βάπτισμα "baptism" /908 baptisma "baptism", 909 βαπτισμός "baptisms" /909 baptismos "baptisms", and 910 βαπτστἠς "baptist" /910 baptistes "baptist".) which is a neologism in the New Testament derived from the masculine Greek noun baptismós (βαπτισμός), a term for ritual washing in Greek language texts of Hellenistic Judaism during the Second Temple period, such as the Septuagint. Both of these nouns are derived from the verb baptízō (βαπτίζω, 'I wash' transitive verb), which is used in Jewish texts for ritual washing, and in the New Testament both for ritual washing and also for the apparently new rite of báptisma.

The Greek verb báptō (βάπτω), 'dip', from which the verb baptízō is derived, is in turn hypothetically traced to a reconstructed Indo-European root *gʷabh-, 'dip'.

The Greek words are used in a great variety of meanings. βάπτω and βαπτίζω in Hellenism had the general usage of "immersion", "going under" (as a material in a liquid dye) or "perishing" (as in a ship sinking or a person drowning), with the same double meanings as in English "to sink into" or "to be overwhelmed by", with bathing or washing only occasionally used and usually in sacral contexts.

== History ==
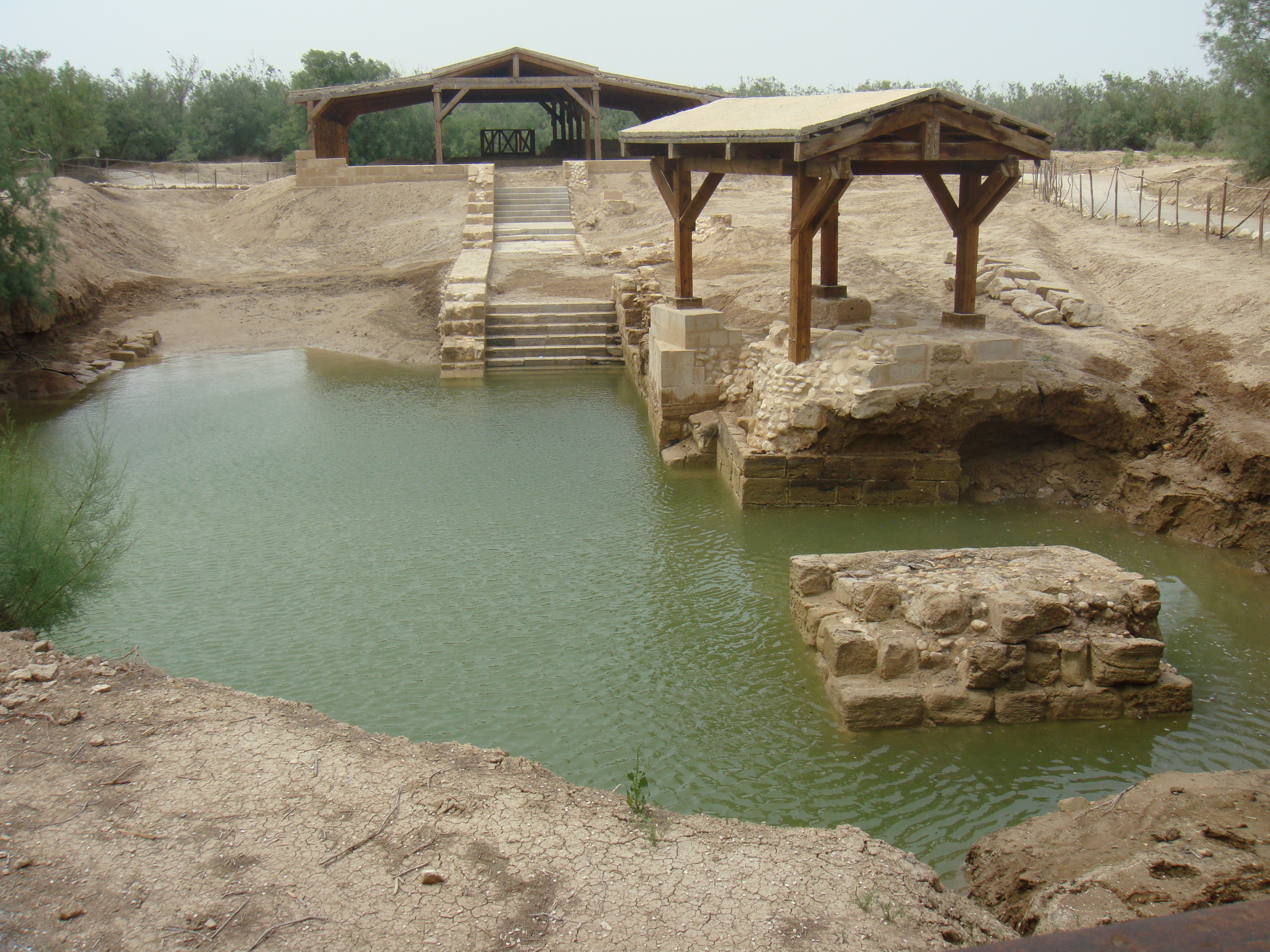
The Al-Maghtas ruins on the Jordanian side of the Jordan River, traditionally considered the location for the Baptism of Jesus and the ministry of John the Baptist.

The practice of baptism emerged from Jewish ritualistic practices during the Second Temple Period, when figures such as John the Baptist emerged. At that time, Jewish ritual immersion was rooted in the purification practices prescribed in the Hebrew Bible, such as those described in Leviticus 15. This immersion (tevilah) was practiced in a ritual bath known as a mikveh or in natural bodies of water, including rivers. For example, various texts in the Dead Sea Scrolls (DSS) corpus at Qumran describe ritual practices involving washing, bathing, sprinkling, and immersing. One example of such a text is a DSS known as the Community Rule, which says "And by the compliance of his soul with all the laws of God his flesh is cleansed by being sprinkled with cleansing waters and being made holy with the waters of repentance."

The Mandaeans, who are followers of John the Baptist, practice frequent full immersion baptism (masbuta) as a ritual of purification. According to Mandaean sources, they left the Jordan Valley in the 1st century AD.

John the Baptist, who is considered a forerunner to Christianity, used baptism as the central sacrament of his messianic movement. The apostle Paul distinguished between the baptism of John, ("baptism of repentance") and baptism in the name of Jesus, and it is questionable whether Christian baptism was in some way linked with that of John. However, according to Mark 1:8, John seems to connect his water baptism as a type of the true, ultimate baptism of Jesus, which is by the Spirit. Christians consider Jesus to have instituted the sacrament of baptism.

Though some form of immersion was likely the most common method of baptism in the early church, many of the writings from the ancient church appeared to view this mode of baptism as inconsequential. The Didache 7.1–3 (AD 60–150) allowed for affusion practices in situations where immersion was not practical. Likewise, Tertullian (AD 196–212) allowed for varying approaches to baptism even if those practices did not conform to biblical or traditional mandates (cf. De corona militis 3; De baptismo 17). Finally, Cyprian (ca. AD 256) explicitly stated that the amount of water was inconsequential and defended immersion, affusion, and aspersion practices (Epistle 75.12). As a result, there was no uniform or consistent mode of baptism in the ancient church prior to the fourth century.

By the third and fourth centuries, baptism involved catechetical instruction, chrismation, exorcisms, laying on of hands, and recitation of a creed.

In the Early Middle Ages, infant baptism became common and the rite was significantly simplified and increasingly emphasized. In Western Europe Affusion became the normal mode of baptism between the twelfth and fourteenth centuries, though immersion was still practiced into the sixteenth. In the medieval period, some radical Christians rejected the practice of baptism as a sacrament. Sects such as the Tondrakians, Cathars, Arnoldists, Petrobrusians, Henricans, Brethren of the Free Spirit, and the Lollards were regarded as heretics by the Catholic Church. In the sixteenth century, Martin Luther retained baptism as a sacrament, but Swiss reformer Huldrych Zwingli considered baptism and the Lord's Supper to be symbolic. Anabaptists denied the validity of the practice of infant baptism, and rebaptized converts.

== Mode and manner ==
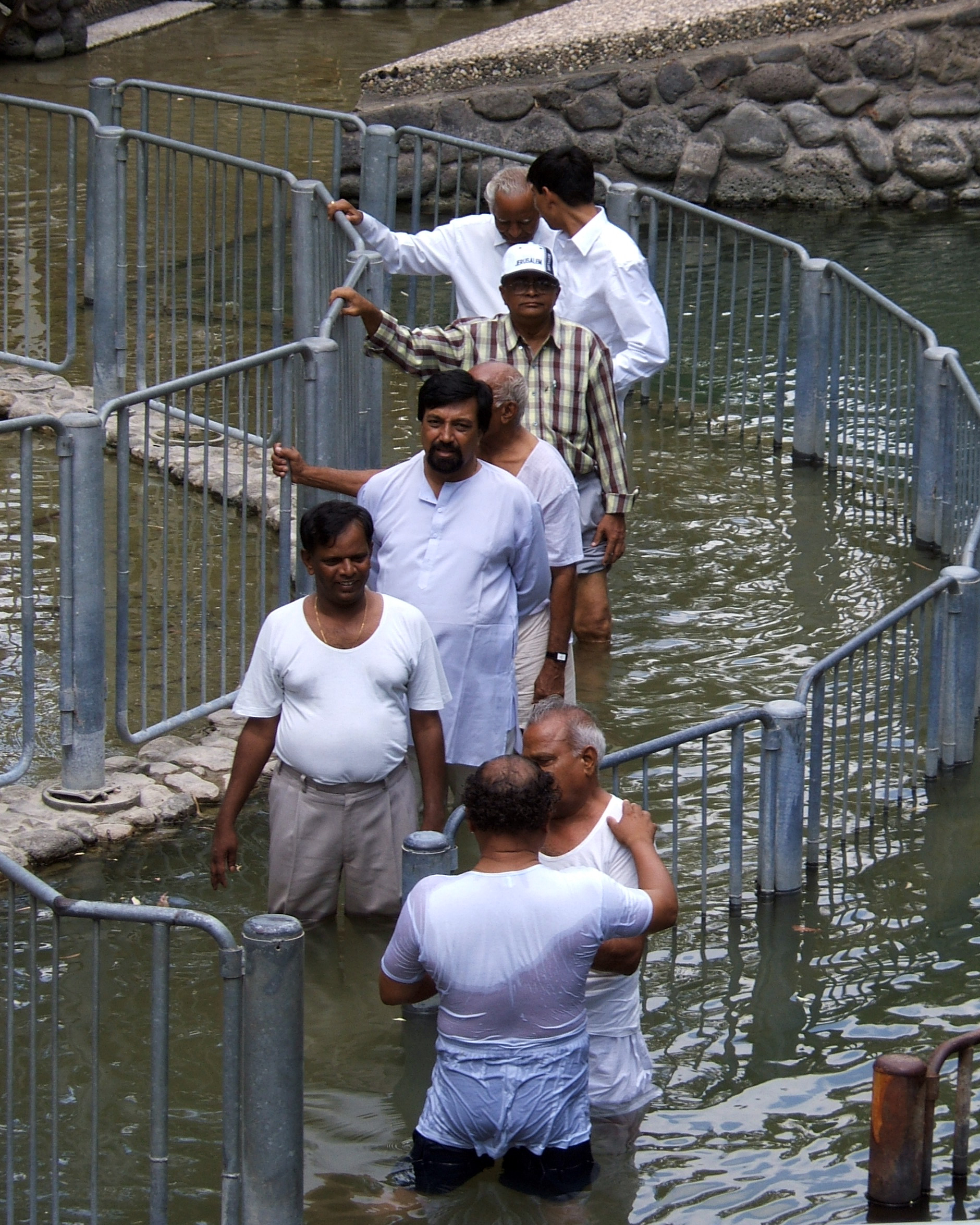
Men lined up to be baptized by immersion in the Jordan River.

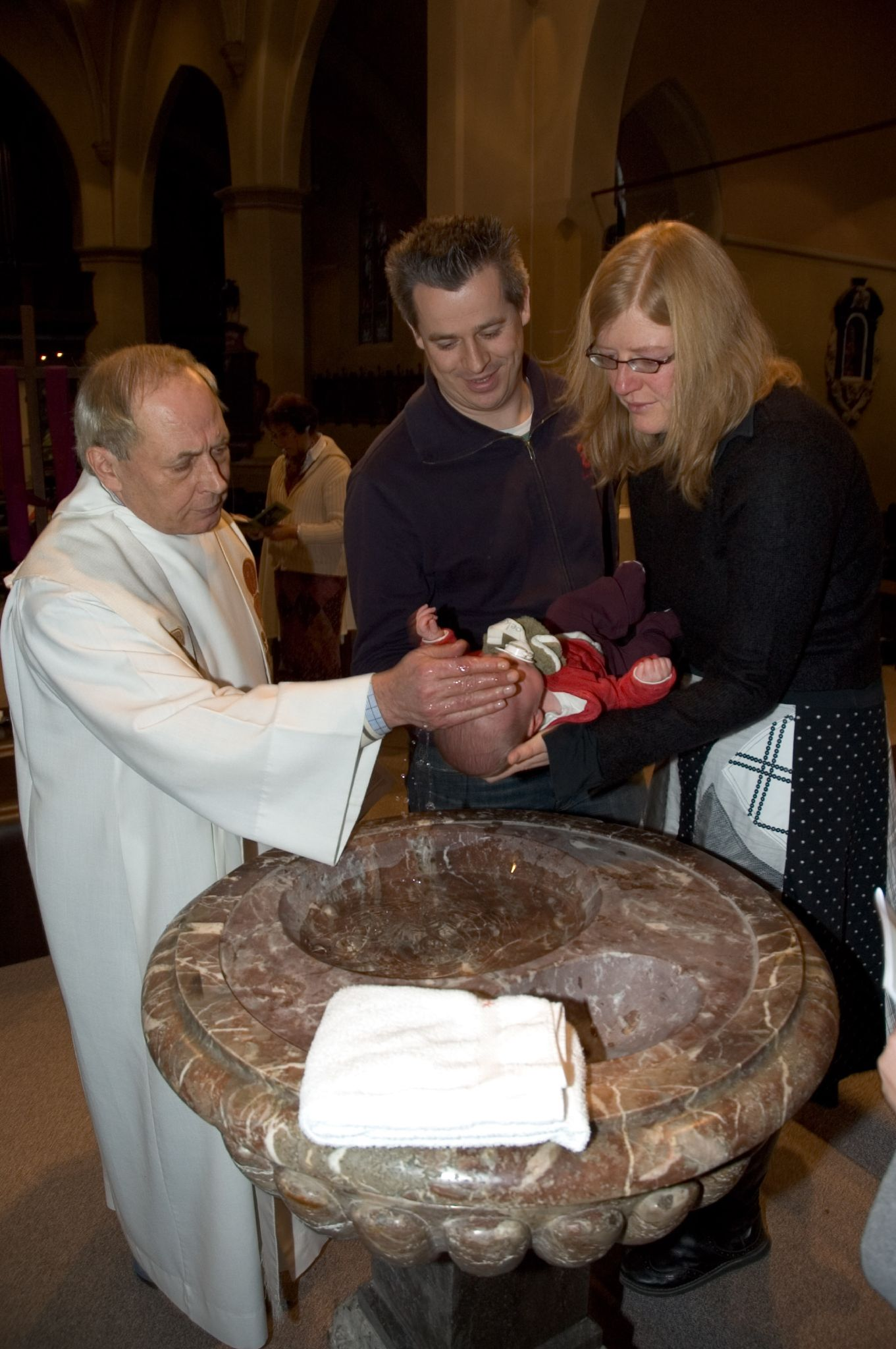
Baptism of a child by affusion

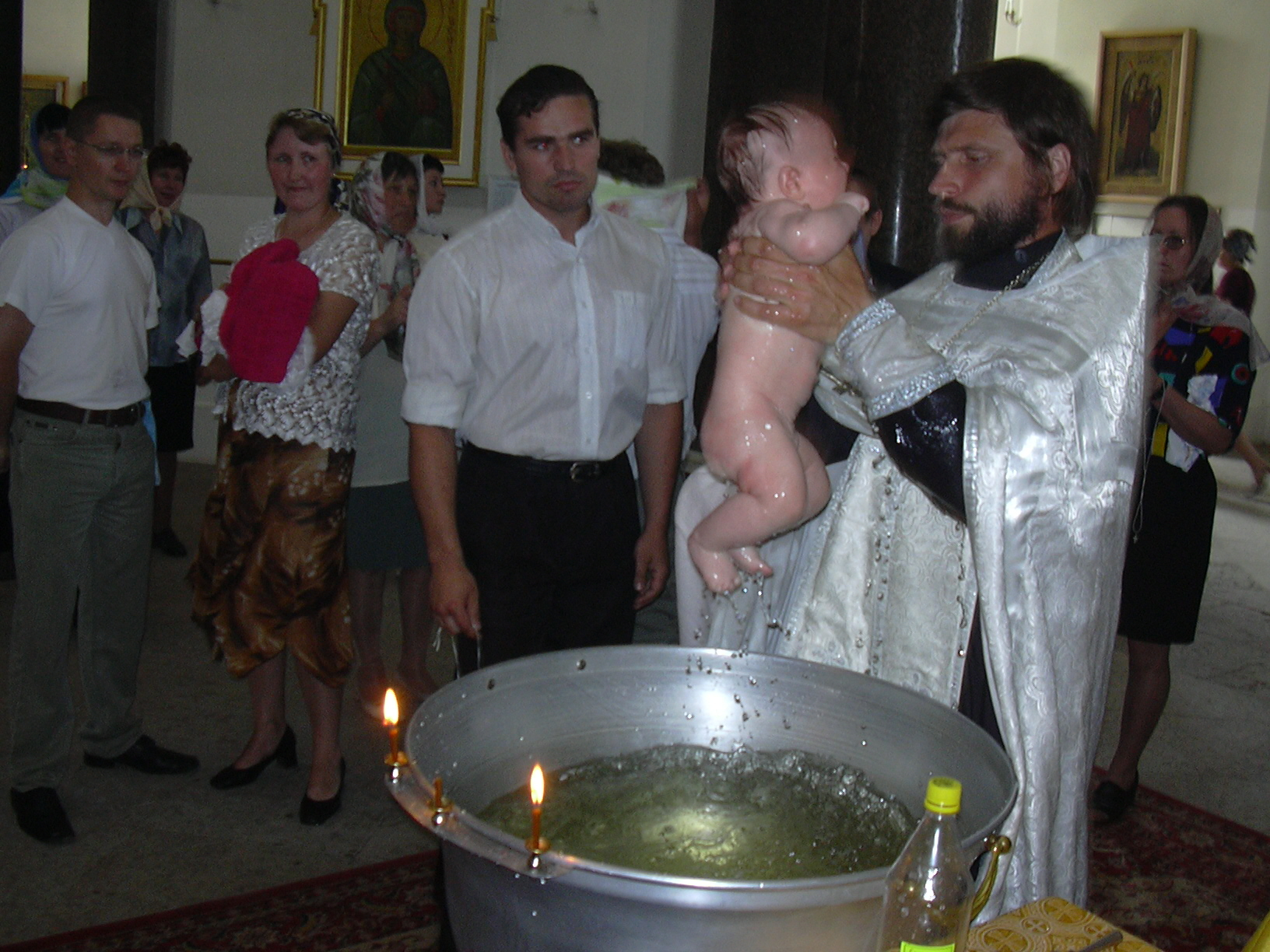
Baptism by submersion in the Eastern Orthodox Church (Sophia Cathedral, 2005)

Baptism is practiced in several ways. Aspersion is the sprinkling of water on the head, and affusion is the pouring of water over the head. Traditionally, a person is sprinkled, poured, or immersed three times for each person of the Holy Trinity, with this ancient Christian practice called trine baptism or triune baptism. The Didache specifies:

This is how you should baptize: Having recited all these things, [the first half of the Teaching, "The Way of Life and the Way of Death"] baptize in the name of the Father and the Son and the Holy Spirit, in running water. If you do not have running water, then baptize in still water. The water should be cold, but if you do not have cold water, then use warm. If you have neither, then just pour water on the head three times in the name of the Father, the Son, and the Holy Spirit. Both the one who is baptized and the one who baptizes should fast beforehand, along with any others who are able, the one that is baptized being told to fast for a day or two.

— J. B. Lightfoot, Stephen Tompkins, Dan Graves, The Didache, Christian History Institute

The word "immersion" is derived from Late Latin immersio, a noun derived from the verb immergere (in – "into" + mergere "dip"). In relation to baptism, some use the term to refer to any form of dipping, whether the body is put completely under water or only partially dipped in water. They thus speak of immersion as being either total or partial. Others, particularly within the Anabaptist traditions, use "immersion" to refer exclusively to plunging someone entirely under the surface of the water. The term "immersion" is also used of a form of baptism in which water is poured over someone standing in water, without fully submerging the person. For the three different meanings of the word "immersion", see Immersion baptism.

When "immersion" is used in opposition to "submersion", it indicates the form of baptism in which the candidate stands or kneels in water and water is poured over the upper part of the body. Immersion in this sense has been employed in West and East since at least the 2nd century and is the form in which baptism is generally depicted in early Christian art. In the West, this method of baptism began to be replaced by affusion baptism from around the 8th century, but it continues in use in Eastern Christianity.

The word submersion comes from the Late Latin (sub- "under, below" + mergere "plunge, dip") and is also sometimes called "complete immersion". It is the form of baptism in which the water completely covers the candidate's body. Submersion is practiced in the Orthodox and several other Eastern churches. In the Latin Church of the Catholic Church, baptism by submersion is used in the Ambrosian Rite and is one of the methods provided in the Roman Rite of the baptism of infants. It is seen as obligatory among some groups that have arisen since the Protestant Reformation, such as Baptists.

=== Meaning of the Greek verb baptizein ===
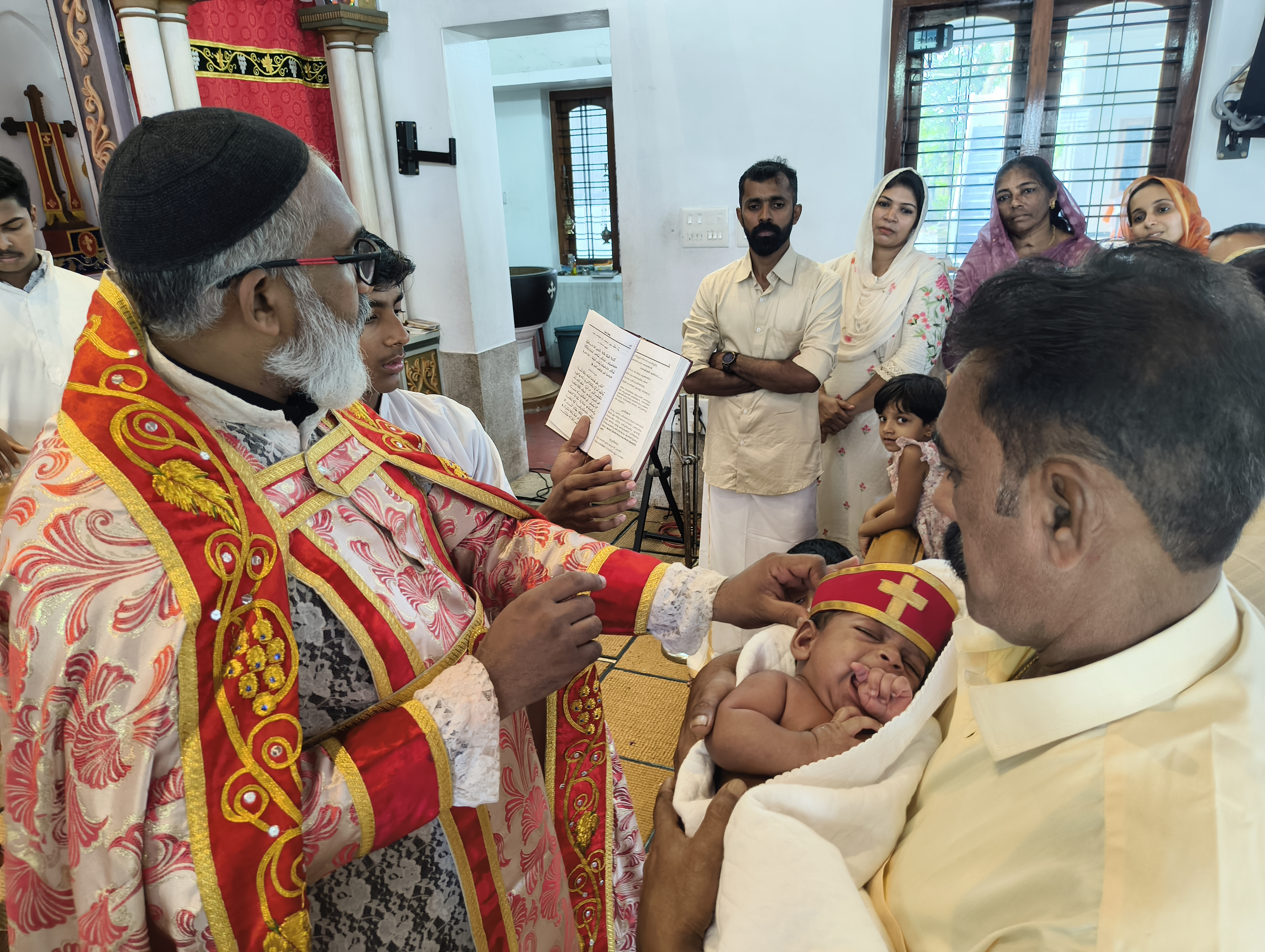
The Holy Baptism in a Syriac Orthodox Church in India

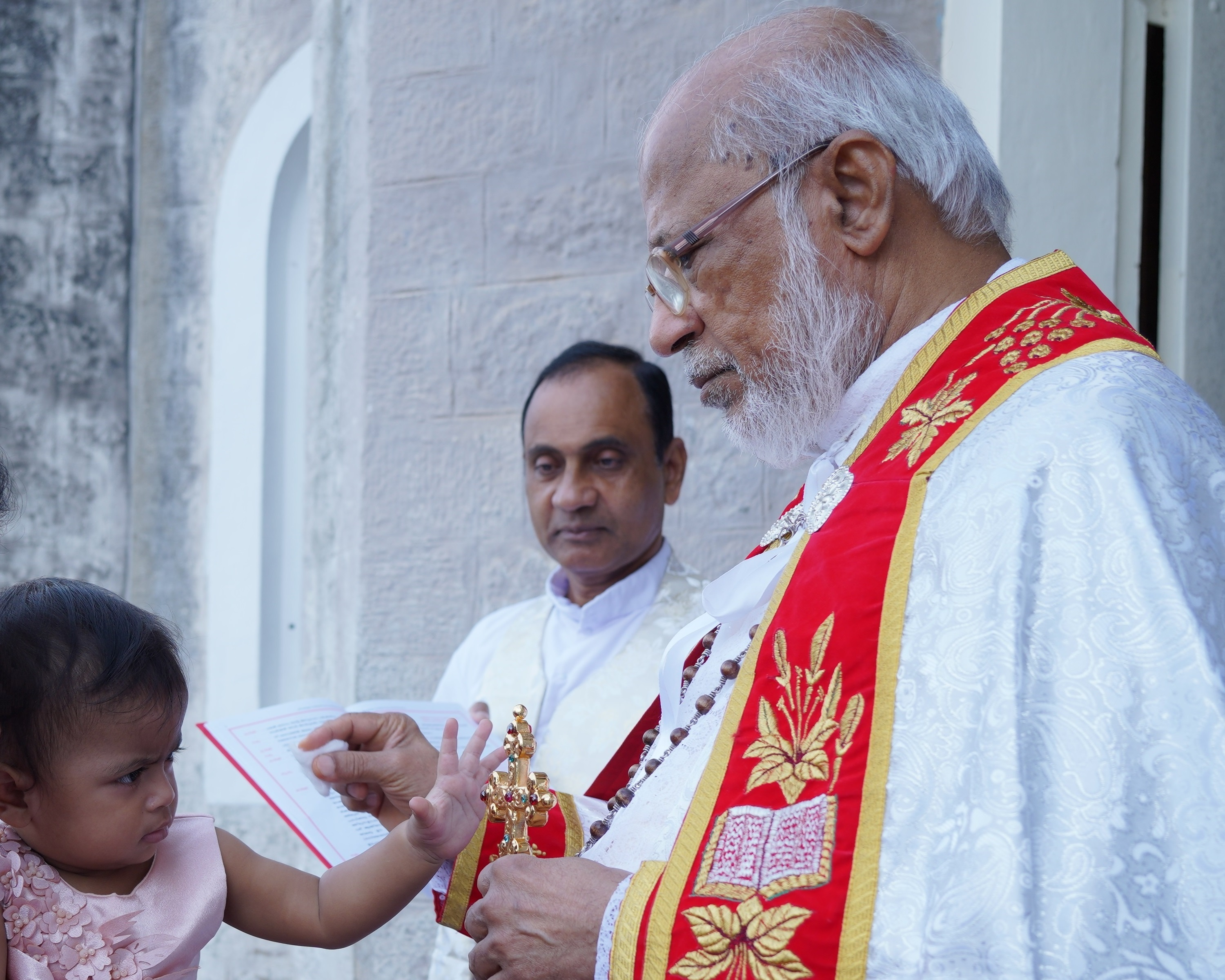
Baptism of a child solemnized by George Alencherry, Major Archbishop of the Syro-Malabar Catholic Church

The Greek-English Lexicon of Liddell and Scott gives the primary meaning of the verb baptízein, from which the English verb "baptize" is derived, as "dip, plunge", and gives examples of plunging a sword into a throat or an embryo and for drawing wine by dipping a cup in the bowl; for New Testament usage it gives two meanings: "baptize", with which it associates the Septuagint mention of Naaman dipping himself in the Jordan River, and "perform ablutions", as in Luke 11:38.

Although the Greek verb baptízein does not exclusively mean dip, plunge or immerse (it is used with literal and figurative meanings such as "sink", "disable", "overwhelm", "go under", "overborne", "draw from a bowl"), lexical sources typically cite this as a meaning of the word in both the Septuagint and the New Testament.

A. N. S. Lane wrote "While it is true that the basic root meaning of the Greek words for baptize and baptism is immerse/immersion, it is not true that the words can simply be reduced to this meaning, as can be seen from Mark 10:38–39, Luke 12:50, Matthew 3:11, Luke 3:16, and Corinthians 10:2."

Two passages in the Gospels indicate that the verb baptízein did not always indicate submersion. The first is Luke 11:38, which tells how a Pharisee, at whose house Jesus ate, "was astonished to see that he did not first wash (ἐβαπτίσθη, aorist passive of βαπτίζω—literally, "was baptized") before dinner". This is the passage that Liddell and Scott cites as an instance of the use of βαπτίζω to mean perform ablutions. Jesus' omission of this action is similar to that of his disciples: "Then came to Jesus scribes and Pharisees, which were of Jerusalem, saying, Why do thy disciples transgress the tradition of the elders? for they wash (νίπτω) not their hands when they eat bread". The other Gospel passage pointed to is: "The Pharisees ... do not eat unless they wash (νίπτω, the ordinary word for washing) their hands thoroughly, observing the tradition of the elders; and when they come from the market place, they do not eat unless they wash themselves (literally, "baptize themselves"—βαπτίσωνται, passive or middle voice of βαπτίζω)".

Scholars of various denominations claim that these two passages show that invited guests, or people returning from market, would not be expected to immerse themselves ("baptize themselves") totally in water but only to practice the partial immersion of dipping their hands in water or to pour water over them, as is the only form admitted by present Jewish custom. In the second of the two passages, it is actually the hands that are specifically identified as "washed", not the entire person, for whom the verb used is baptízomai, literally "be baptized", "be immersed", a fact obscured by English versions that use "wash" as a translation of both verbs. Zodhiates concludes that the washing of the hands was done by immersing them. The Liddell–Scott–Jones Greek-English Lexicon (1996) cites the other passage (Luke 11:38) as an instance of the use of the verb baptízein to mean "perform ablutions", not "submerge". References to the cleaning of vessels which use βαπτίζω also refer to immersion.

As already mentioned, the lexicographical work of Zodhiates says that, in the second of these two cases, the verb baptízein indicates that, after coming from the market, the Pharisees washed their hands by immersing them in collected water. Balz & Schneider understand the meaning of βαπτίζω, used in place of ῥαντίσωνται (sprinkle), to be the same as βάπτω, to dip or immerse, a verb used of the partial dipping of a morsel held in the hand into wine or of a finger into spilled blood.

A possible additional use of the verb baptízein to relate to ritual washing is suggested by Peter Leithart (2007) who suggests that Paul's phrase "Else what shall they do who are baptized for the dead?" relates to Jewish ritual washing. In Jewish Greek the verb baptízein "baptized" has a wider reference than just "baptism" and in Jewish context primarily applies to the masculine noun baptismós "ritual washing"

The verb baptízein occurs four times in the Septuagint in the context of ritual washing, baptismós; Judith cleansing herself from menstrual impurity, Naaman washing seven times to be cleansed from leprosy, etc.

Additionally, in the New Testament only, the verb baptízein can also relate to the neuter noun báptisma "baptism" which is a neologism unknown in the Septuagint and other pre-Christian Jewish texts.

This broadness in the meaning of baptízein is reflected in English Bibles rendering "wash", where Jewish ritual washing is meant: for example Mark 7:4 states that the Pharisees "except they wash (Greek "baptize"), they do not eat", and "baptize" where báptisma, the new Christian rite, is intended.

=== Derived nouns ===
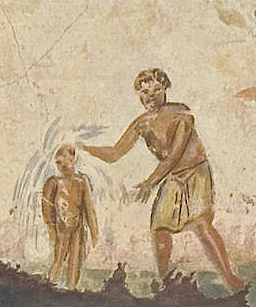
Catacombs of San Callisto: baptism in a 3rd-century painting

Two nouns derived from the verb baptízō (βαπτίζω) appear in the New Testament: the masculine noun baptismós (βαπτισμός) and the neuter noun báptisma (βάπτισμα):

- baptismós (βαπτισμός) refers in Mark 7:4 to a water-rite for the purpose of purification, washing, cleansing, of dishes; in the same verse and in Hebrews 9:10 to Levitical cleansings of vessels or of the body; and in Hebrews 6:2 perhaps also to baptism, though there it may possibly refer to washing an inanimate object. According to Spiros Zodhiates when referring merely to the cleansing of utensils baptismós (βαπτισμός) is equated with rhantismós (ῥαντισμός, "sprinkling"), found only in Hebrews 12:24 and Peter 1:2, a noun used to indicate the symbolic cleansing by the Old Testament priest.
- báptisma (βάπτισμα), which is a neologism appearing to originate in the New Testament, and probably should not be confused with the earlier Jewish concept of baptismós (βαπτισμός), Later this is found only in writings by Christians. In the New Testament, it appears at least 21 times:
  - 13 times with regard to the rite practiced by John the Baptist;
  - 3 times with reference to the specific Christian rite (4 times if account is taken of its use in some manuscripts of Colossians 2:12, where, however, it is most likely to have been changed from the original baptismós than vice versa);
  - 5 times in a metaphorical sense.
- Manuscript variation: In Colossians, some manuscripts have neuter noun báptisma (βάπτισμα), but some have masculine noun baptismós (βαπτισμός), and this is the reading given in modern critical editions of the New Testament. If this reading is correct, then this is the only New Testament instance in which baptismós (βαπτισμός) is clearly used of Christian baptism, rather than of a generic washing, unless the opinion of some is correct that Hebrews 6:2 may also refer to Christian baptism.
- The feminine noun baptisis, along with the masculine noun baptismós both occur in Josephus's Antiquities (J. AJ 18.5.2) relating to the murder of John the Baptist by Herod. This feminine form is not used elsewhere by Josephus, nor in the New Testament.

=== Apparel ===
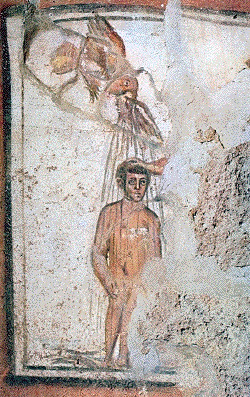
Fresco of a baptism from the catacombs of Marcellinus and Peter.

Until the Middle Ages, most baptisms were performed with the candidates naked—as is evidenced by most of the early portrayals of baptism (some of which are shown in this article), and the early Church Fathers and other Christian writers. Deaconesses helped female candidates for reasons of modesty.

Typical of these is Cyril of Jerusalem who wrote "On the Mysteries of Baptism" in the 4th century (c. 350 AD):

Do you not know, that so many of us as were baptized into Jesus Christ, were baptized into His death? ... for you are not under the Law, but under grace.

1. Therefore, I shall necessarily lay before you the sequel of yesterday's Lecture, that you may learn of what those things, which were done by you in the inner chamber, were symbolic.

2. As soon, then, as you entered, you put off your tunic; and this was an image of putting off the old man with his deeds. Having stripped yourselves, you were naked; in this also imitating Christ, who was stripped naked on the Cross, and by His nakedness put off from Himself the principalities and powers, and openly triumphed over them on the tree. For since the adverse powers made their lair in your members, you may no longer wear that old garment; I do not at all mean this visible one, but the old man, which waxes corrupt in the lusts of deceit. May the soul which has once put him off, never again put him on, but say with the Spouse of Christ in the Song of Songs, I have put off my garment, how shall I put it on? O wondrous thing! You were naked in the sight of all, and were not ashamed; for truly ye bore the likeness of the first-formed Adam, who was naked in the garden, and was not ashamed.

3. Then, when you were stripped, you were anointed with exorcised oil, from the very hairs of your head to your feet, and were made partakers of the good olive-tree, Jesus Christ.

4. After these things, you were led to the holy pool of Divine Baptism, as Christ was carried from the Cross to the Sepulchre which is before our eyes. And each of you was asked, whether he believed in the name of the Father, and of the Son, and of the Holy Ghost, and you made that saving confession, and descended three times into the water, and ascended again; here also hinting by a symbol at the three days burial of Christ ... And at the self-same moment you were both dying and being born;

— Cyril of Jerusalem, Catechetical Lecture 20 (On the Mysteries. II. of Baptism), Romans 6:3–14

The symbolism is threefold:

1. Baptism is considered to be a form of rebirth—"by water and the Spirit"—the nakedness of baptism (the second birth) paralleled the condition of one's original birth. For example, John Chrysostom calls the baptism "λοχείαν", i.e., giving birth, and "new way of creation ... from water and Spirit" ("to John" speech 25,2), and later elaborates:

For nothing perceivable was handed over to us by Jesus; but with perceivable things, all of them however conceivable. This is also the way with the baptism; the gift of the water is done with a perceivable thing, but the things being conducted, i.e., the rebirth and renovation, are conceivable. For, if you were without a body, He would hand over these bodiless gifts as naked [gifts] to you. But because the soul is closely linked to the body, He hands over the perceivable ones to you with conceivable things. (Chrysostom to Matthew, speech 82, 4, c. 390 A.D.)

2. The removal of clothing represented the "image of putting off the old man with his deeds" (as per Cyril, above), so the stripping of the body before for baptism represented taking off the trappings of sinful self, so that the "new man", which is given by Jesus, can be put on.

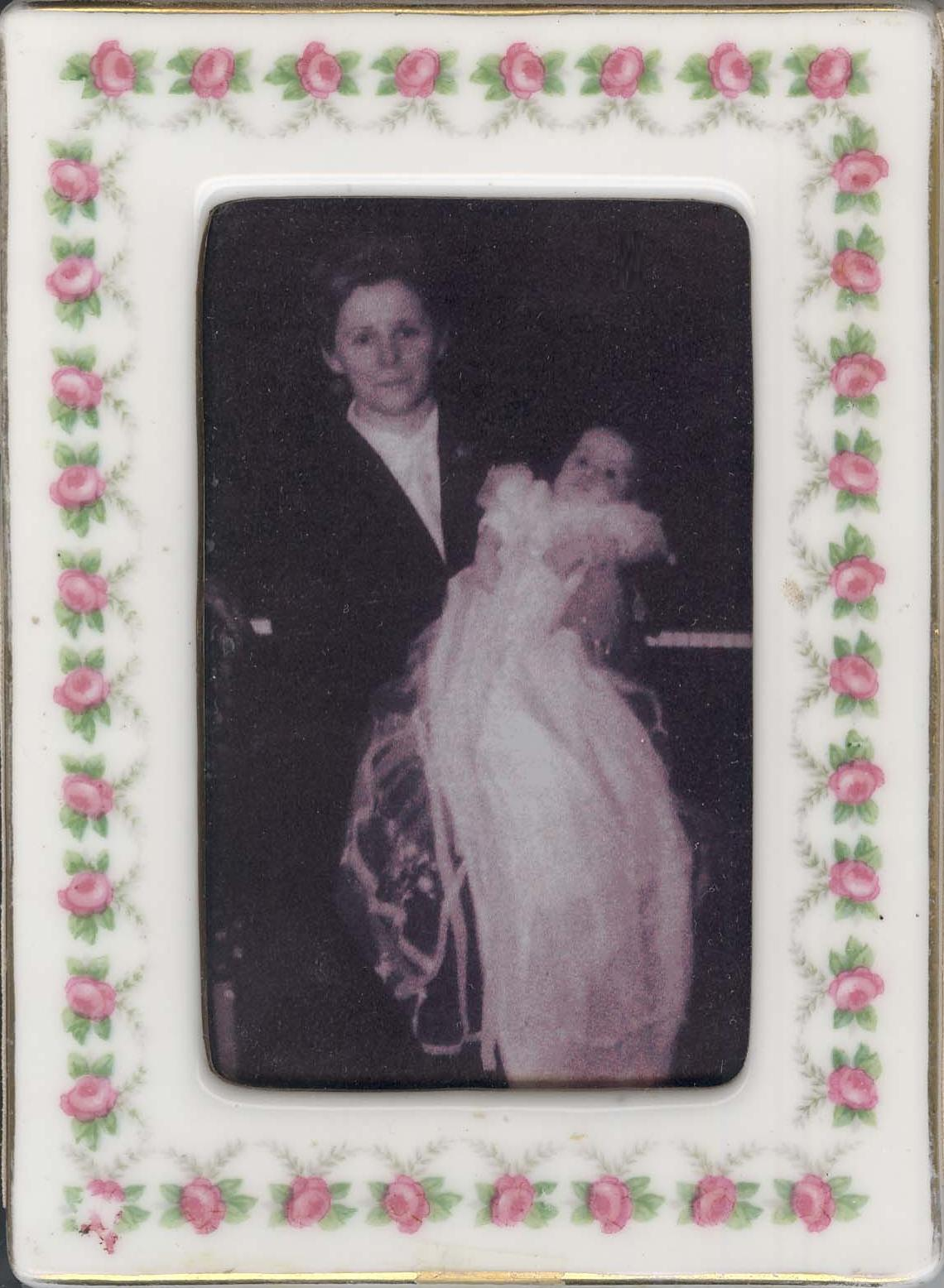
Long-laced gown worn at a typical Lutheran baptism in Sweden in 1948

3. As Cyril again asserts above, as Adam and Eve in scripture were naked, innocent and unashamed in the Garden of Eden, nakedness during baptism was seen as a renewal of that innocence and state of original sinlessness. Other parallels can also be drawn, such as between the exposed condition of Christ during His crucifixion, and the crucifixion of the "old man" of the repentant sinner in preparation for baptism.

Changing customs and concerns regarding modesty probably contributed to the practice of permitting or requiring the baptismal candidate to either retain their undergarments (as in many Renaissance paintings of baptism such as those by da Vinci, Tintoretto, Van Scorel, Masaccio, de Wit and others) or to wear, as is almost universally the practice today, baptismal robes. These robes are most often white, symbolizing purity. Some groups today allow any suitable clothes to be worn, such as trousers and a T-shirt—practical considerations include how easily the clothes will dry (denim is discouraged), and whether they will become see-through when wet.

In certain Christian denominations, the individual being baptized receives a cross necklace that is worn for the rest of their life as a "sign of the triumph of Christ over death and our belonging to Christ" (though it is replaced with a new cross pendant if lost or broken). This practice of baptized Christians wearing a cross necklace at all times is derived from Canon 73 and Canon 82 of the Sixth Ecumenical Council (Synod) of Constantinople, which declared:

... all the Church (Sunday) School children [must] wear a cross knowing how spiritually beneficial it is for them. By wearing a cross the child is protected from evil forces, it invites the grace of the Holy Cross of Christ, it brings His Divine blessing upon the child, it gives the child a sense that he or she belongs to Christ, that he or she has a special identity, that of a Christian, it is a reminder that Christ is always with him/her, it reminds the child that Jesus died on the Cross to save him/her, that Jesus Christ is our Only Savior and the True God. By wearing a cross the child feels the love of God and gives the child hope and strength to overcome any obstacle in his or her life.

— Konstantopoulos, 2017

== Meaning and effects ==
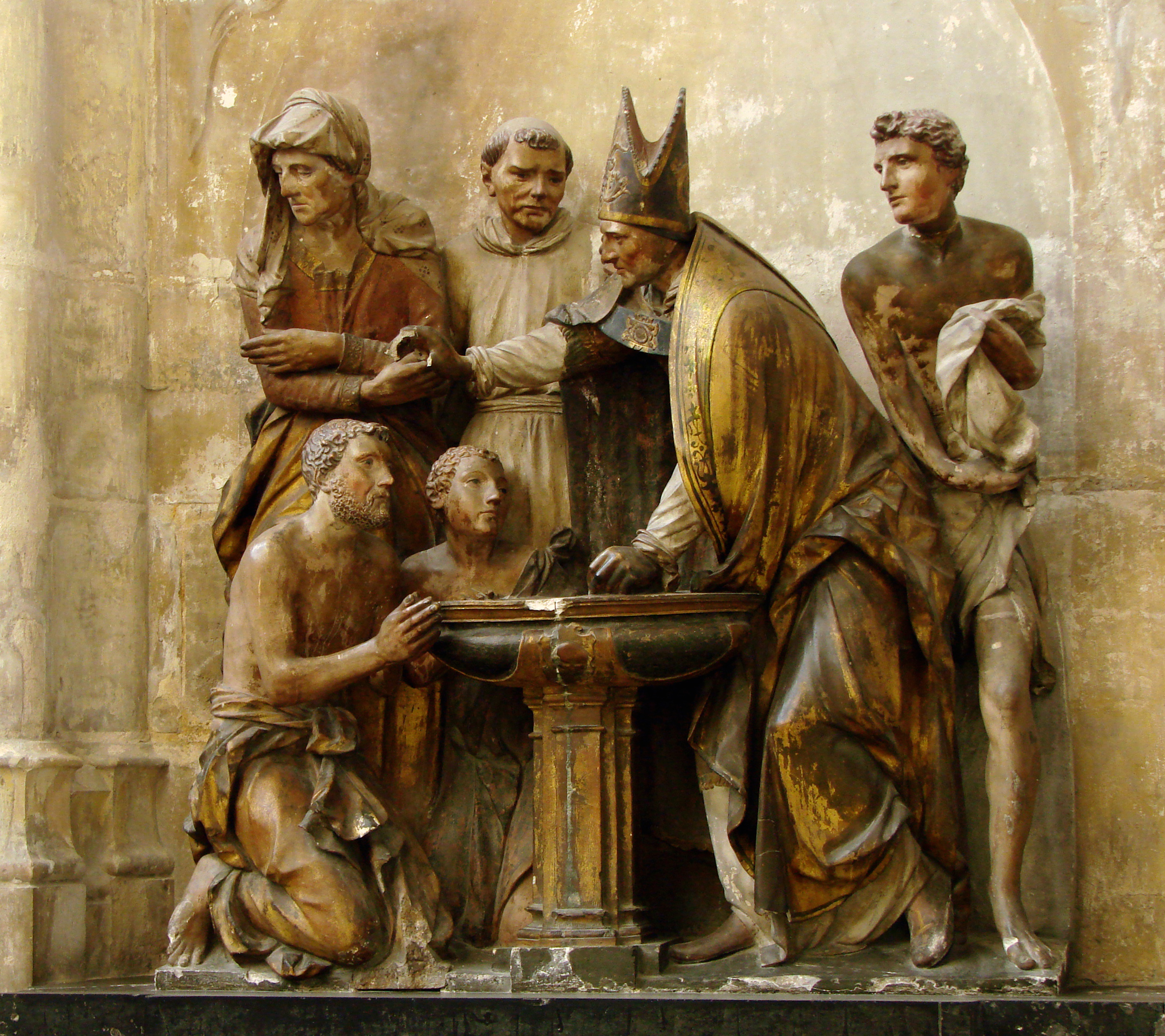
Baptism of Augustine of Hippo as represented in a sculptural group in Troyes cathedral (1549)

There are differences in views about the effect of baptism for a Christian. Catholics, Orthodox, and most mainline Protestant groups assert baptism is a requirement for salvation and a sacrament, and speak of "baptismal regeneration". Its importance is related to their interpretation of the meaning of the "Mystical Body of Christ" as found in the New Testament. This view is shared by the Catholic and Eastern Orthodox denominations, and by churches formed early during the Protestant Reformation such as Lutheran and Anglican. For example, Martin Luther said:

To put it most simply, the power, effect, benefit, fruit, and purpose of Baptism is to save. No one is baptized in order to become a prince, but as the words say, to "be saved". To be saved, we know, is nothing else than to be delivered from sin, death, and the devil and to enter into the kingdom of Christ and live with him forever.

— Luther's Large Catechism, 1529

The Churches of Christ, Jehovah's Witnesses, Christadelphians, and The Church of Jesus Christ of Latter-day Saints espouse baptism as necessary for salvation.

For Catholics, baptism by water is a sacrament of initiation into the life of the children of God (Catechism of the Catholic Church, 1212–13). It configures the person to Christ (CCC 1272), and obliges the Christian to share in the church's apostolic and missionary activity (CCC 1270). The Catholic holds that there are three types of baptism by which one can be saved: sacramental baptism (with water), baptism of desire (explicit or implicit desire to be part of the church founded by Jesus Christ), and baptism of blood (martyrdom). In his encyclical Mystici Corporis Christi of June 29, 1943, Pope Pius XII spoke of baptism and profession of the true faith as what makes members of the one true church, which is the body of Jesus Christ himself, as God the Holy Spirit has taught through the Apostle Paul:

18 ... Through the waters of Baptism those who are born into this world dead in sin are not only born again and made members of the Church, but being stamped with a spiritual seal they become able and fit to receive the other Sacraments. ...
22 Actually only those are to be included as members of the Church who have been baptized and profess the true faith, and who have not been so unfortunate as to separate themselves from the unity of the Body, or been excluded by legitimate authority for grave faults committed. 'For in one spirit' says the Apostle, 'were we all baptized into one Body, whether Jews or Gentiles, whether bond or free.' As therefore in the true Christian community there is only one Body, one Spirit, one Lord, and one Baptism, so there can be only one faith. And therefore if a man refuse to hear the Church let him be considered—so the Lord commands—as a heathen and a publican. It follows that those who are divided in faith or government cannot be living in the unity of such a Body, nor can they be living the life of its one Divine Spirit.

— Mystici Corporis Christi

By contrast, Anabaptist and Evangelical Protestants recognize baptism as an outward sign of an inward reality following on an individual believer's experience of forgiving grace. Reformed and Methodist Protestants maintain a link between baptism and regeneration, but believe that it is not automatic or mechanical, and that regeneration may occur at a different time than baptism. Churches of Christ teach that in baptism a believer surrenders his life in faith and obedience to God, and that God "by the merits of Christ's blood, cleanses one from sin and truly changes the state of the person from an alien to a citizen of God's kingdom. Baptism is not a human work; it is the place where God does the work that only God can do." Thus, they see baptism as a passive act of faith rather than a meritorious work; it "is a confession that a person has nothing to offer God".

=== Christian traditions ===
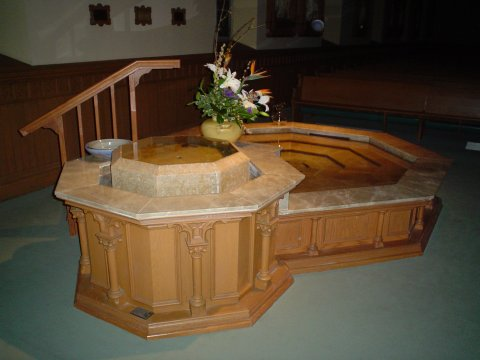
The baptistry at St. Raphael's Cathedral, Dubuque, Iowa, includes a small pool for immersion of adults and an eight-sided font symbolizing the "eighth" day of Christ's Resurrection.

The liturgy of baptism for Catholics, Eastern Orthodox, Lutherans, Anglicans, and Methodists makes clear reference to baptism as not only a symbolic burial and resurrection, but an actual supernatural transformation, one that draws parallels to the experience of Noah and the passage of the Israelites through the Red Sea divided by Moses. Thus, baptism is literally and symbolically not only cleansing, but also dying and rising again with Christ. Catholics believe baptism is necessary to cleanse the taint of original sin, and so commonly baptize infants.

The Eastern churches (Eastern Orthodox Church and Oriental Orthodoxy) also baptize infants on the basis of texts, such as Matthew 19:14, which are interpreted as supporting full church membership for children. In these denominations, baptism is immediately followed by Chrismation and Communion at the next Divine Liturgy, regardless of age. Orthodox likewise believe that baptism removes what they call the ancestral sin of Adam. Anglicans believe that baptism is also the entry into the church. Most Methodists and Anglicans agree that it also cleanses the taint of what in the West is called original sin, in the East ancestral sin.

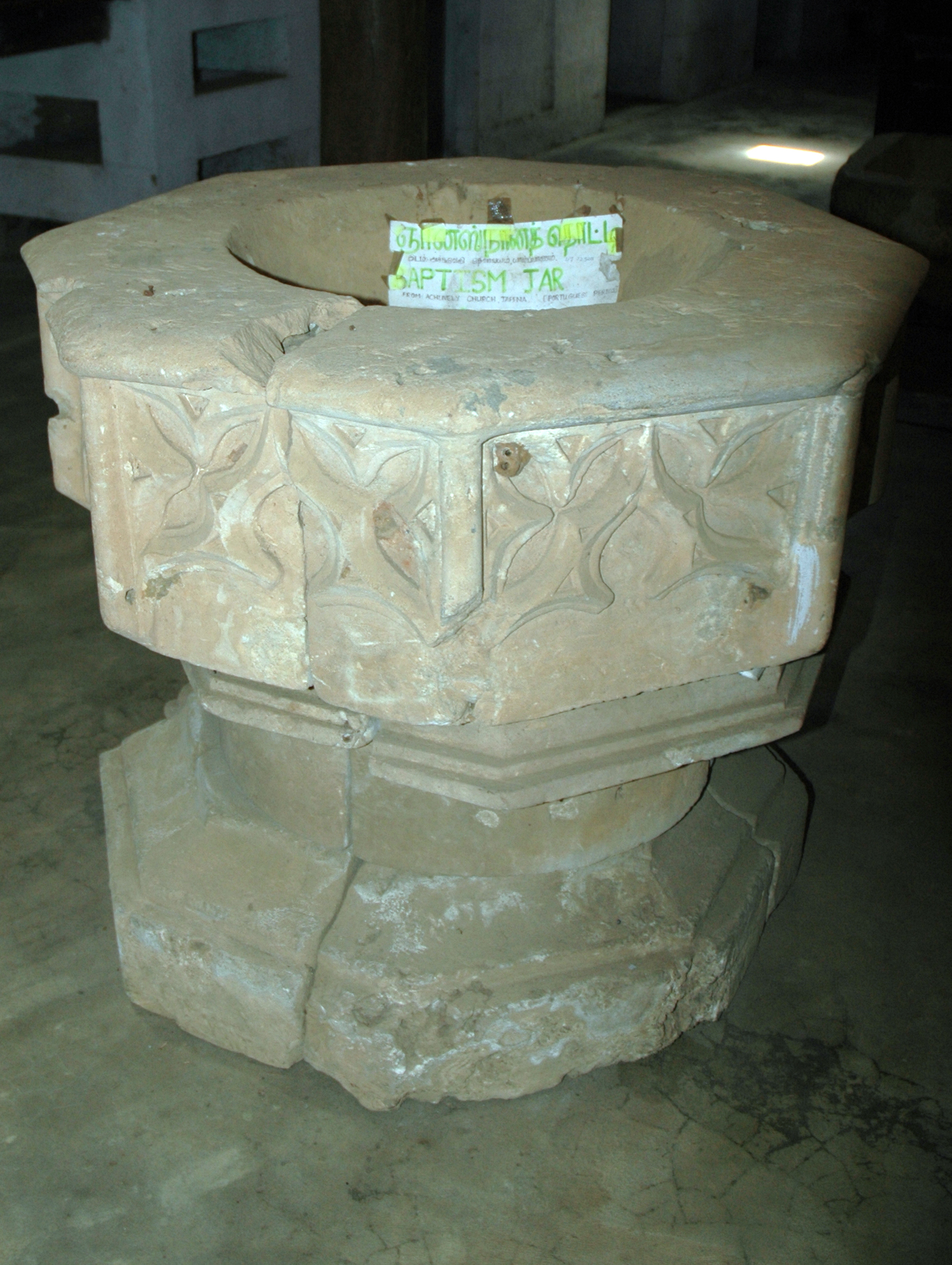
Baptism Jar, used in Portuguese Ceylon

Eastern Orthodox Christians usually practice complete threefold immersion as both a symbol of death and rebirth into Christ, and as a washing away of sin. Latin Church Catholics generally baptize by affusion (pouring); Eastern Catholics usually by submersion, or at least partial immersion. However, submersion is gaining in popularity within the Latin Church. In newer church sanctuaries, the baptismal font may be designed to expressly allow for baptism by immersion. Anglicans baptize by immersion or affusion.

According to evidence which can be traced back to about the year 200, sponsors or godparents are present at baptism and vow to uphold the Christian education and life of the baptized.

Baptists argue that the Greek word βαπτίζω originally meant "to immerse". They interpret some Biblical passages concerning baptism as requiring submersion of the body in water. They also state that only submersion reflects the symbolic significance of being "buried" and "raised" with Christ. Baptist churches baptize in the name of the Trinity—the Father, the Son, and the Holy Spirit. However, they do not believe that baptism is necessary for salvation; but rather that it is an act of Christian obedience.

Some "Full Gospel" charismatic churches such as Oneness Pentecostals baptize only in the name of Jesus Christ, citing Peter's preaching baptism in the name of Jesus as their authority.

=== Ecumenical statements ===
In 1982 the World Council of Churches published the ecumenical paper Baptism, Eucharist and Ministry. The preface of the document states:

Those who know how widely the churches have differed in doctrine and practice on baptism, Eucharist and ministry, will appreciate the importance of the large measure of agreement registered here. Virtually all the confessional traditions are included in the Commission's membership. That theologians of such widely different denominations should be able to speak so harmoniously about baptism, Eucharist and ministry is unprecedented in the modern ecumenical movement. Particularly noteworthy is the fact that the Commission also includes among its full members theologians of the Catholic and other churches which do not belong to the World Council of Churches itself.

— World Council of Churches, Baptism, Eucharist and Ministry—Faith and Order Paper No. 111, 1982

A 1997 document, Becoming a Christian: The Ecumenical Implications of Our Common Baptism, gave the views of a commission of experts brought together under the aegis of the World Council of Churches. It states:

... according to Acts 2:38, baptisms follow from Peter's preaching baptism in the name of Jesus and lead those baptized to the receiving of Christ's Spirit, the Holy Ghost, and life in the community: "They devoted themselves to the apostles' teaching and fellowship, to the breaking of bread and the prayers" as well as to the distribution of goods to those in need.

Those who heard, who were baptized and entered the community's life, were already made witnesses of and partakers in the promises of God for the last days: the forgiveness of sins through baptism in the name of Jesus and the outpouring of the Holy Ghost on all flesh. Similarly, in what may well be a baptismal pattern, 1 Peter testifies that proclamation of the resurrection of Jesus Christ and teaching about new life lead to purification and new birth. This, in turn, is followed by eating and drinking God's food, by participation in the life of the community—the royal priesthood, the new temple, the people of God—and by further moral formation. At the beginning of 1 Peter the writer sets this baptism in the context of obedience to Christ and sanctification by the Spirit. So baptism into Christ is seen as baptism into the Spirit. In the fourth gospel Jesus' discourse with Nicodemus indicates that birth by water and Spirit becomes the gracious means of entry into the place where God rules.

=== Validity considerations by some churches ===
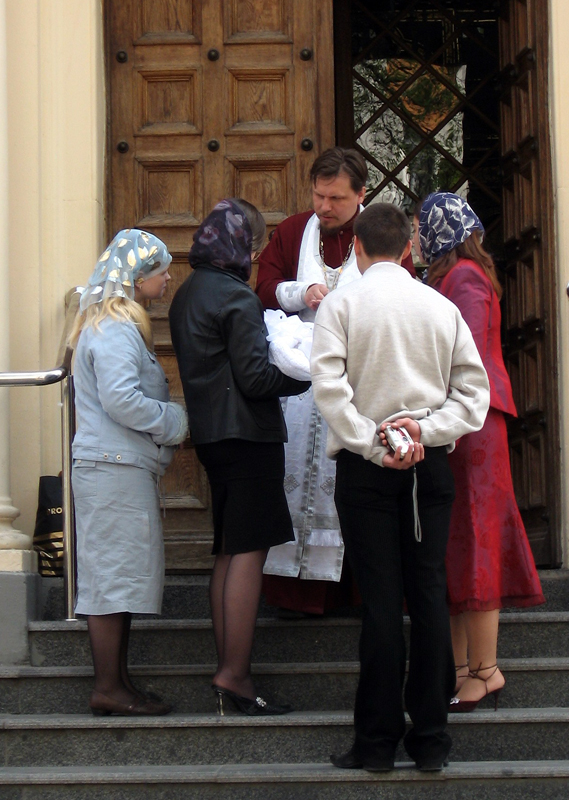
Russian Orthodox priest greeting an infant and its godparents on the steps of the church at the beginning of the Sacred Mystery of Baptism

The vast majority of Christian denominations believe theologically that baptism is a sacrament, that has actual spiritual, holy and salvific effects. Certain key criteria must be complied with for it to be valid, i.e., to actually have those effects. If these key criteria are met, violation of some rules regarding baptism, such as varying the authorized rite for the ceremony, renders the baptism illicit (contrary to the church's laws) but still valid.

One of the criteria for validity is use of the correct form of words. The Catholic Church teaches that the use of the verb "to baptize" is essential. Catholics of the Latin Church, Anglicans and Methodists use the form "I baptize you in the name of ...". The passive voice is used by Eastern Orthodox and Byzantine Catholics, the form being "The Servant of God is baptized in the name of ...".

Use of the Trinitarian formula ("in the name of the Father, and of the Son, and of the Holy Spirit") is also considered essential; thus these churches do not accept as valid baptisms of non-Trinitarian churches such as Oneness Pentecostals.

Another essential condition is use of water. A baptism in which some liquid that would not usually be called water, such as wine, milk, soup or fruit juice, was used would not be considered valid.

Another requirement is that the celebrant intends to perform baptism. This requirement entails the intention "to do what the Church does", not necessarily to have Christian faith, since it is not the person baptizing, but the Holy Spirit working through the sacrament, who produces the effects of the sacrament. Doubt about the faith of the baptizer is thus no ground for doubt about the validity of the baptism.

Some conditions expressly do not affect validity—for example, whether submersion, immersion, affusion (pouring) or aspersion (sprinkling) is used. However, if water is sprinkled, there is a danger that the water may not touch the skin of the unbaptized. As has been stated, "it is not sufficient for the water to merely touch the candidate; it must also flow, otherwise there would seem to be no real ablution. At best, such a baptism would be considered doubtful. If the water touches only the hair, the sacrament has probably been validly conferred, though in practice the safer course must be followed. If only the clothes of the person have received the aspersion, the baptism is undoubtedly void." For many communions, validity is not affected if a single submersion or pouring is performed rather than a triple, but in Orthodoxy this is controversial.

According to the Catholic Church, baptism imparts an indelible "seal" upon the soul of the baptized and therefore a person who has already been baptized cannot be validly baptized again. This teaching was affirmed against the Donatists who practiced rebaptism. The grace received in baptism is believed to operate ex opere operato and is therefore considered valid even if administered in heretical or schismatic groups.

=== Recognition by other denominations ===
The Catholic, Orthodox, Lutheran, Anglican, Presbyterian, and Methodist churches accept baptism performed by other denominations within this group as valid, subject to certain conditions, including the use of the Trinitarian formula. It is only possible to be baptized once, so people with valid baptisms from other denominations may not be baptized again upon conversion or transfer. For Catholics, this is affirmed in the Canon Law 864, in which it is written that "[e]very person not yet baptized and only such a person is capable of baptism." Such people are accepted upon making a profession of faith, and if they have not yet validly received the sacrament/rite of confirmation or chrismation, by being confirmed. Specifically, "Methodist theologians argued that since God never abrogated a covenant made and sealed with proper intentionality, rebaptism was never an option, unless the original baptism had been defective by not having been made in the name of the Trinity." In some cases, it can be difficult to decide if the original baptism was in fact valid; if there is doubt, conditional baptism is administered, with a formula on the lines of "If you are not yet baptized, I baptize you ...".

The Catholic Church ordinarily recognizes as valid the baptisms of Christians of the Eastern Orthodox, Churches of Christ, Congregationalist, Anglican, Lutheran, Old Catholic, Polish National Catholic, Reformed, Baptist, Brethren, Methodist, Presbyterian, Waldensian, and United Protestant denominations; Christians of these traditions are received into the Catholic Church through the sacrament of Confirmation. Some individuals of the Mennonite, Pentecostal and Adventist traditions who wish to be received into the Catholic Church may be required to receive a conditional baptism due to concerns about the validity of the sacraments in those traditions. The Catholic Church has explicitly denied the validity of the baptism conferred in The Church of Jesus Christ of Latter-day Saints.

The Reformed churches recognize as valid, baptisms administered in the Catholic Church, among other churches using the Trinitarian formula.

Practice in the Eastern Orthodox Church for converts from other communions is not uniform. However, generally, baptisms performed in the name of the Holy Trinity are accepted by the Orthodox Christian Church; Christians of the Oriental Orthodox, Catholic, Lutheran, Old Catholic, Moravian, Anglican, Methodist, Reformed, Presbyterian, Brethren, Assemblies of God, or Baptist traditions can be received into the Eastern Orthodox Church through the sacrament of Chrismation. If a convert has not received the sacrament (mysterion) of baptism, he or she must be baptized in the name of the Holy Trinity before they may enter into communion with the Orthodox Church. If he or she has been baptized in another Christian confession (other than Orthodox Christianity) his or her previous baptism is considered retroactively filled with grace by chrismation or, in rare circumstances, confession of faith alone, as long as the baptism was done in the name of the Holy Trinity (Father, Son and Holy Spirit). The exact procedure is dependent on local canons and is the subject of some controversy.

Oriental Orthodox Churches recognize the validity of baptisms performed within the Eastern Orthodox Communion. Some also recognize baptisms performed by Catholic churches. Any supposed baptism not performed using the Trinitarian formula is considered invalid.

In the eyes of the Catholic Church, all Orthodox churches, Anglican, and Lutheran churches, the baptism conferred by the Church of Jesus Christ of Latter-day Saints is invalid. An article published together with the official declaration to that effect gave reasons for that judgment, summed up in the following words: "The Baptism of the Catholic Church and that of the Church of Jesus Christ of Latter-day Saints differ essentially, both for what concerns faith in the Father, Son and Holy Spirit, in whose name Baptism is conferred, and for what concerns the relationship to Christ who instituted it."

The Church of Jesus Christ of Latter-day Saints stresses that baptism must be administered by one having proper authority; consequently, the church does not recognize the baptism of any other church as effective.

Jehovah's Witnesses do not recognise any other baptism occurring after 1914 as valid, as they believe that they are now the one true church of Christ, and that the rest of "Christendom" is false religion.

=== Officiant ===
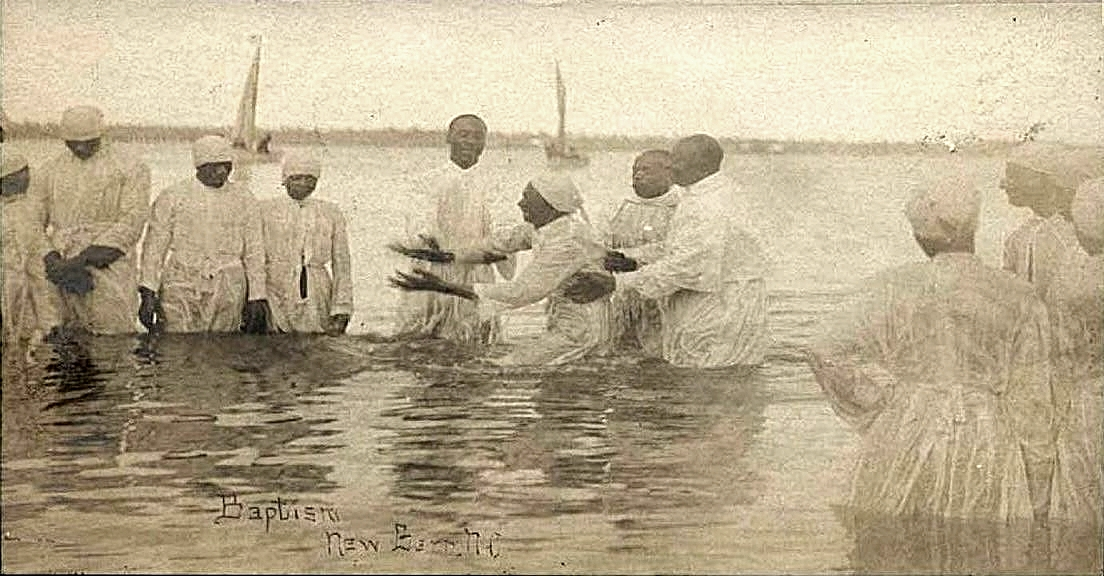
A river baptism in North Carolina at the turn of the 20th century. Full immersion (submersion) baptism remains common practice in many African American Christian congregations.

There is debate among Christian churches as to who can administer baptism. Some claim that the examples given in the New Testament only show apostles and deacons administering baptism. Ancient Christian churches interpret this as indicating that baptism should be performed by the clergy except in extremis, i.e., when the one being baptized is in immediate danger of death. Then anyone may baptize, provided, in the view of the Eastern Orthodox Church, the person who does the baptizing is a member of that church, or, in the view of the Catholic Church, that the person, even if not baptized, intends to do what the church does in administering the rite. Many Protestant churches see no specific prohibition in the biblical examples and permit any believer to baptize another.

In the Catholic Church, canon law for the Latin Church lays down that the ordinary minister of baptism is a bishop, priest or deacon, but its administration is one of the functions "especially entrusted to the parish priest". If the person to be baptized is at least fourteen years old, that person's baptism is to be referred to the bishop, so that he can decide whether to confer the baptism himself. If no ordinary minister is available, a catechist or some other person whom the local ordinary has appointed for this purpose may licitly do the baptism; indeed in a case of necessity any person (irrespective of that person's religion) who has the requisite intention may confer the baptism By "a case of necessity" is meant imminent danger of death because of either illness or an external threat. "The requisite intention" is, at the minimum level, the intention "to do what the Church does" through the rite of baptism.

In the Eastern Catholic Churches, a deacon is not considered an ordinary minister. Administration of the sacrament is reserved to the parish priest or to another priest to whom he or the local hierarch grants permission, a permission that can be presumed if in accordance with canon law. However, "in case of necessity, baptism can be administered by a deacon or, in his absence or if he is impeded, by another cleric, a member of an institute of consecrated life, or by any other Christian faithful; even by the mother or father, if another person is not available who knows how to baptize."

The discipline of the Eastern Orthodox Church, Oriental Orthodoxy and the Assyrian Church of the East is similar to that of the Eastern Catholic Churches. They require the baptizer, even in cases of necessity, to be of their own faith, on the grounds that a person cannot convey what he himself does not possess, in this case membership in the church. The Latin Catholic Church does not insist on this condition, considering that the effect of the sacrament, such as membership of the church, is not produced by the person who baptizes, but by the Holy Spirit. For the Orthodox, while Baptism in extremis may be administered by a deacon or any lay-person, if the newly baptized person survives, a priest must still perform the other prayers of the Rite of Baptism, and administer the Mystery of Chrismation.

The discipline of Anglicanism and Lutheranism is similar to that of the Latin Catholic Church. For Methodists and many other Protestant denominations, the ordinary minister of baptism is an ordained or appointed minister.

Newer movements of Protestant Evangelical churches, particularly non-denominational, allow laypeople to baptize.

In The Church of Jesus Christ of Latter-day Saints, only a man who has been ordained to the Aaronic priesthood holding the priesthood office of priest or higher office in the Melchizedek priesthood may administer baptism.

A Jehovah's Witnesses baptism is performed by a "dedicated male" adherent. Only in extraordinary circumstances would a "dedicated" baptizer be unbaptized (see section Jehovah's Witnesses).

== Practitioners ==
=== Protestantism ===
==== Anabaptist ====
Early Anabaptists were so named because they re-baptized those who they did not recognise as baptized, believing infant baptism to be invalid.

The traditional form of Anabaptist baptism was pouring, the form commonly used in Western Christianity in the early 16th century when they emerged. Pouring continues to be normative in Mennonite, Amish, and Hutterite traditions of Anabaptist Christianity. The Mennonite Brethren Church, Schwarzenau Brethren, and River Brethren denominations of Anabaptist Christianity practice immersion. The Schwarzenau church immerses in the forward position three times, for each person of the Holy Trinity and because "the Bible says Jesus bowed his head (letting it fall forward) and died. Baptism represents a dying of the old, sinful self." Today all modes of baptism (such as pouring and immersion) can be found among Anabaptists.

Conservative Mennonite Anabaptists count baptism to be one of the seven ordinances. In Anabaptist theology, baptism is a part of the process of salvation. For Anabaptists, "believer's baptism consists of three parts, the Spirit, the water, and the blood—these three witnesses on earth." According to Anabaptist theology: (1) In believer's baptism, the Holy Spirit witnesses the candidate entering into a covenant with God. (2) God, in believer's baptism, "grants a baptized believer the water of baptism as a sign of His covenant with them—that such a one indicates and publicly confesses that he wants to live in true obedience towards God and fellow believers with a blameless life." (3) Integral to believer's baptism is the candidate's mission to witness to the world even unto martyrdom, echoing Jesus' words that "they would be baptized with His baptism, witnessing to the world when their blood was spilled."

==== Baptist ====
For the majority of Baptists, Christian baptism is the immersion of a believer in water in the name of the Father, the Son, and the Holy Spirit. Baptism does not accomplish anything in itself, but is an outward personal sign that the person's sins have already been washed away by the blood of Christ's cross.

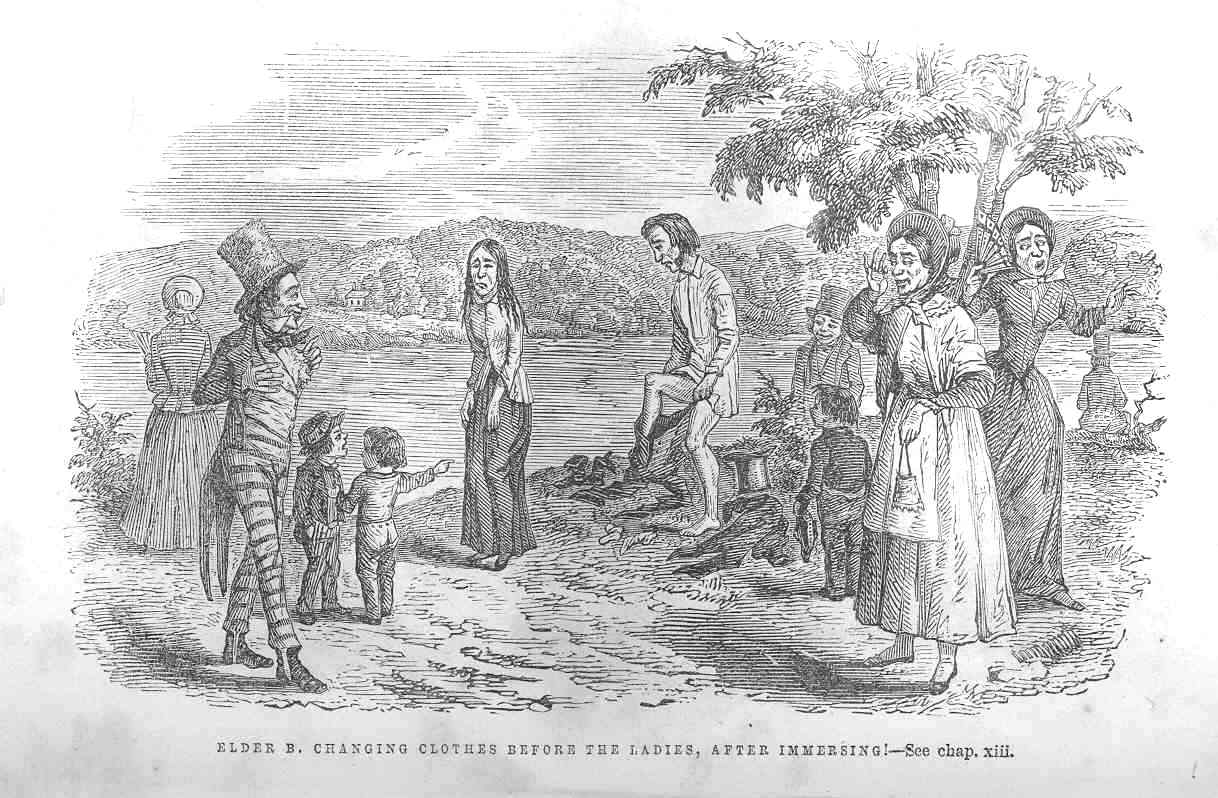
Engraving from William G. Brownlow's book The Great Iron Wheel Examined, showing a Baptist minister changing clothes in front of horrified women after administering a baptism by immersion.

For a new convert the general practice is that baptism also allows the person to be a registered member of the local Baptist congregation (though some churches have adopted "new members classes" as an additional mandatory step for congregational membership).

Regarding rebaptism the general rules are:

- baptisms by other than immersion are not recognized as valid and therefore rebaptism by immersion is required; and
- baptisms by immersion in other denominations may be considered valid if performed after the person having professed faith in Jesus Christ (though among the more conservative groups such as Independent Baptists, rebaptism may be required by the local congregation if performed in a non-Baptist church—and, in extreme cases, even if performed within a Baptist church that wasn't an Independent Baptist congregation)

For newborns, there is a ceremony called child dedication.

Tennessee antebellum Methodist circuit rider and newspaper publisher William G. Brownlow stated within his 1856 book The Great Iron Wheel Examined; or, Its False Spokes Extracted, and an Exhibition of Elder Graves, Its Builder that the immersion baptism practiced within the Baptist churches as found within the United States did not extend in a "regular line of succession... from John the Baptist—but from old Zeke Holliman and his true yoke-fellow, Mr. [Roger] Williams" as during 1639 Holliman and Williams first immersion baptized each other and then immersion baptized the ten other members of the first Baptist church in British America at Providence, Rhode Island.

==== Churches of Christ ====
Baptism in Churches of Christ is performed only by full bodily immersion, based on the Koine Greek verb baptizo which means to dip, immerse, submerge or plunge. Submersion is seen as more closely conforming to the death, burial and resurrection of Jesus than other modes of baptism. Churches of Christ argue that historically immersion was the mode used in the 1st century, and that pouring and sprinkling later emerged as secondary modes when immersion was not possible. Over time these secondary modes came to replace immersion. Only those mentally capable of belief and repentance are baptized (i.e., infant baptism is not practiced because the New Testament has no precedent for it).

Churches of Christ have historically had the most conservative position on baptism among the various branches of the Restoration Movement, understanding baptism by immersion to be a necessary part of conversion. The most significant disagreements concerned the extent to which a correct understanding of the role of baptism is necessary for its validity. David Lipscomb insisted that if a believer was baptized out of a desire to obey God, the baptism was valid, even if the individual did not fully understand the role baptism plays in salvation. Austin McGary contended that to be valid, the convert must also understand that baptism is for the forgiveness of sins. McGary's view became the prevailing one in the early 20th century, but the approach advocated by Lipscomb never totally disappeared. As such, the general practice among churches of Christ is to require rebaptism by immersion of converts, even those who were previously baptized by immersion in other churches.

More recently, the rise of the International Churches of Christ has caused some to reexamine the issue.

Churches of Christ consistently teach that in baptism a believer surrenders his life in faith and obedience to God, and that God "by the merits of Christ's blood, cleanses one from sin and truly changes the state of the person from an alien to a citizen of God's kingdom. Baptism is not a human work; it is the place where God does the work that only God can do." Baptism is a passive act of faith rather than a meritorious work; it "is a confession that a person has nothing to offer God." While Churches of Christ do not describe baptism as a "sacrament", their view of it can legitimately be described as "sacramental". They see the power of baptism coming from God, who chose to use baptism as a vehicle, rather than from the water or the act itself, and understand baptism to be an integral part of the conversion process, rather than just a symbol of conversion.

A recent trend is to emphasize the transformational aspect of baptism: instead of describing it as just a legal requirement or sign of something that happened in the past, it is seen as "the event that places the believer 'into Christ' where God does the ongoing work of transformation." There is a minority that downplays the importance of baptism to avoid sectarianism, but the broader trend is to "reexamine the richness of the biblical teaching of baptism and to reinforce its central and essential place in Christianity."

Because of the belief that baptism is a necessary part of salvation, some Baptists hold that the Churches of Christ endorse the doctrine of baptismal regeneration. However, members of the Churches of Christ reject this, arguing that since faith and repentance are necessary, and that the cleansing of sins is by the blood of Christ through the grace of God, baptism is not an inherently redeeming ritual. Rather, their inclination is to point to the biblical passage in which Peter, analogizing baptism to Noah's flood, posits that "likewise baptism doth also now save us" but parenthetically clarifies that baptism is "not the putting away of the filth of the flesh but the response of a good conscience toward God" (1 Peter 3:21). One author from the churches of Christ describes the relationship between faith and baptism this way, "Faith is the reason why a person is a child of God; baptism is the time at which one is incorporated into Christ and so becomes a child of God" (italics are in the source). Baptism is understood as a confessional expression of faith and repentance, rather than a "work" that earns salvation.

==== Lutheranism ====
In Lutheran Christianity, baptism is a sacrament that regenerates the soul. Upon one's baptism, one receives the Holy Spirit and becomes a part of the church. According to Martin Luther's Small Catechism, it is the word and command of God "in and with the water" that gives baptism its power, which "works forgiveness of sins, delivers from death and the devil, and gives eternal salvation to all who believe this, as the words and promises of God declare". In Lutheran theology, baptism is not viewed as a work that the baptizer performs in obedience to the law, but rather a work of God that is received by faith, which "clings to the water".

==== Methodism ====
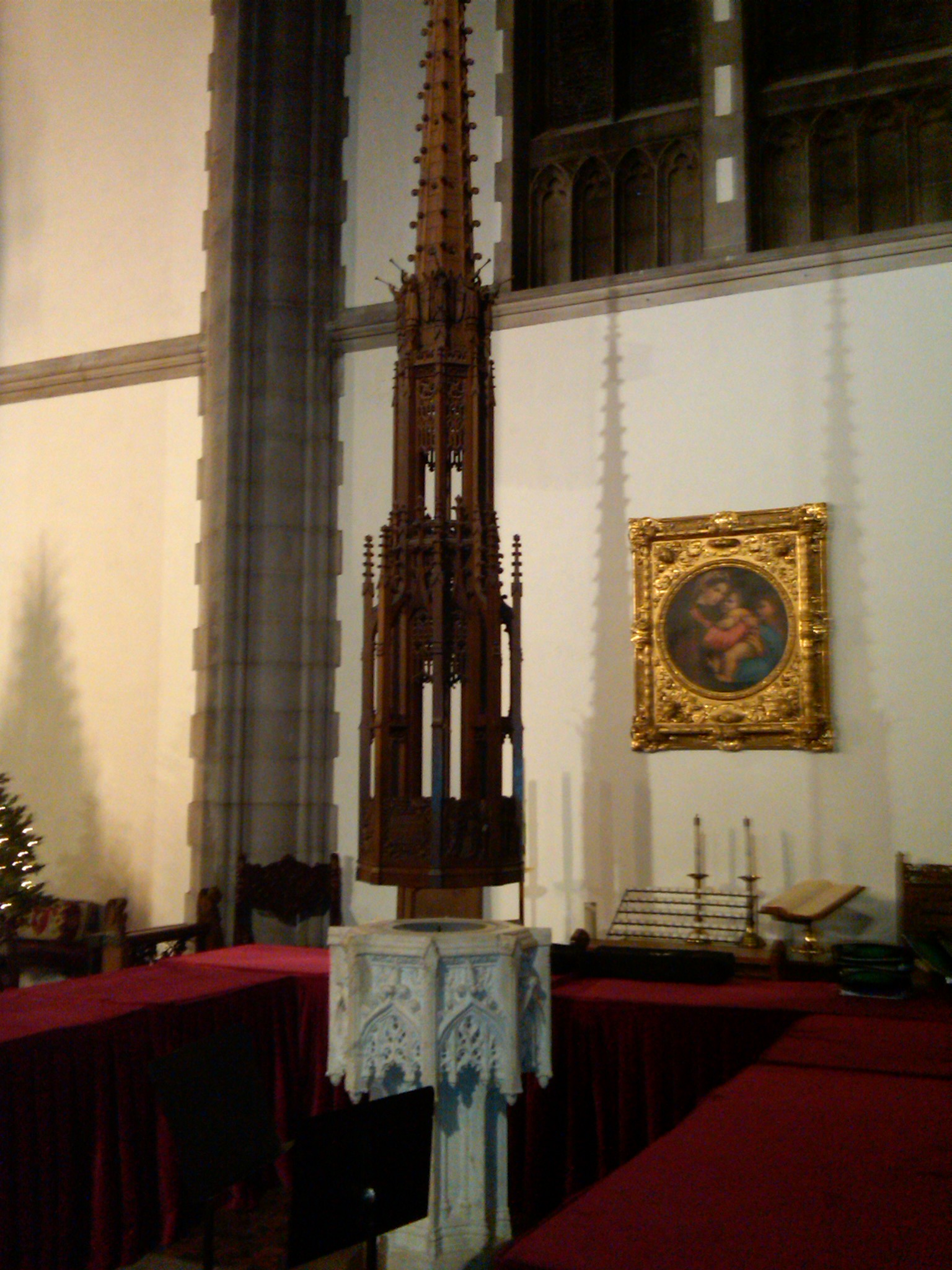
A baptistry in a Methodist church

The Methodist Articles of Religion, with regard to baptism, teach:

Baptism is not only a sign of profession and mark of difference whereby Christians are distinguished from others that are not baptized; but it is also a sign of regeneration or the new birth. The Baptism of young children is to be retained in the Church.

While baptism imparts grace, Methodists teach that a personal acceptance of Jesus Christ (the first work of grace) is essential to one's salvation; during the second work of grace, entire sanctification, a believer is purified of original sin and made holy. As such, in the Methodist tradition, baptism with the Holy Spirit has referred to the second work of grace, entire sanctification (Christian perfection).

In the Methodist churches, baptism is a sacrament of initiation into the visible Church. Wesleyan covenant theology further teaches that baptism is a sign and a seal of the covenant of grace:

Of this great new-covenant blessing, baptism was therefore eminently the sign; and it represented "the pouring out" of the Spirit, "the descending" of the Spirit, the "falling" of the Spirit "upon men", by the mode in which it was administered, the pouring of water from above upon the subjects baptized. As a seal, also, or confirming sign, baptism answers to circumcision.

Methodists recognize three modes of baptism as being valid—"immersion, sprinkling, or pouring" in the name of the Holy Trinity.

==== Moravianism ====
The Moravian Church teaches that baptism is a sign and a seal, recognizing three modes of baptism as being valid: immersion, aspersion, and affusion.

==== Reformed Protestantism ====
In Reformed baptismal theology, baptism is seen as primarily God's offer of union with Christ and all his benefits to the baptized. This offer is believed to be intact even when it is not received in faith by the person baptized. Reformed theologians believe the Holy Spirit brings into effect the promises signified in baptism. Baptism is held by almost the entire Reformed tradition to effect regeneration, even in infants who are incapable of faith, by effecting faith which would come to fruition later. Baptism also initiates one into the visible church and the covenant of grace. Baptism is seen as a replacement of circumcision, which is considered the rite of initiation into the covenant of grace in the Old Testament.

Reformed Christians believe that immersion is not necessary for baptism to be properly performed, but that pouring or sprinkling are acceptable. Only ordained ministers are permitted to administer baptism in Reformed churches, with no allowance for emergency baptism, though baptisms performed by non-ministers are generally considered valid. Reformed churches, while rejecting the baptismal ceremonies of the Catholic church, accept the validity of baptisms performed with them and do not rebaptize.

==== United Protestants ====
In United Protestant churches, such as the United Church of Canada, Church of North India, Church of Pakistan, Church of South India, Protestant Church in the Netherlands, Uniting Church in Australia, and United Church of Christ in Japan, baptism is a sacrament.

=== Catholicism ===
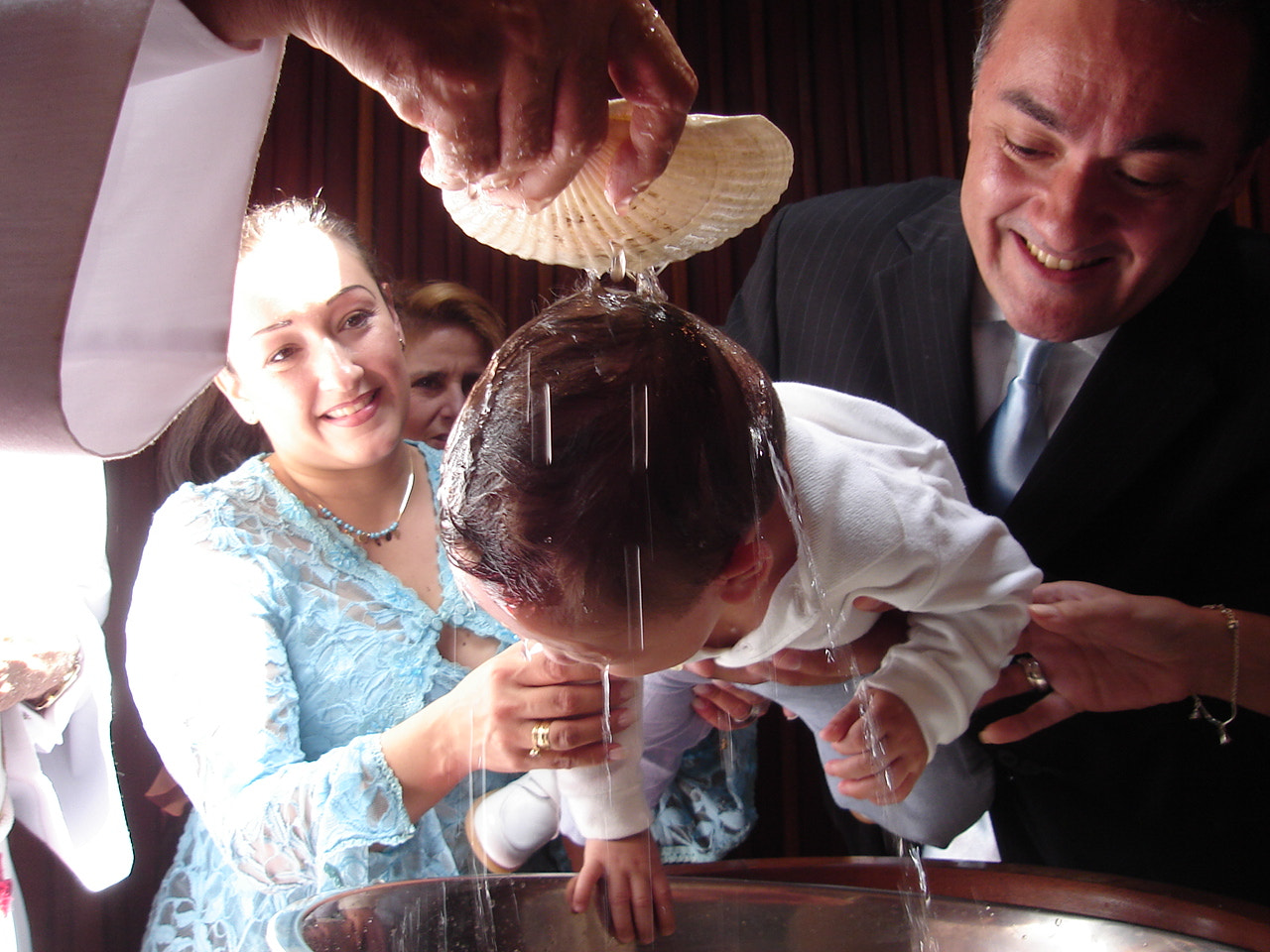
Baptism using a scallop

In Catholic teaching, baptism is stated to be "necessary for salvation by actual reception or at least by desire". Catholic discipline requires the baptism ceremony to be performed by deacons, priests, or bishops, but in an emergency such as danger of death, anyone can licitly baptize. This teaching is based on the Gospel according to John which says that Jesus proclaimed: "Truly, truly, I say to you, unless one is born of water and the Spirit, he cannot enter into the Kingdom of God." It dates back to the teachings and practices of 1st-century Christians, and the connection between salvation and baptism was not, on the whole, an item of major dispute until Huldrych Zwingli denied the necessity of baptism, which he saw as merely a sign granting admission to the Christian community. The Catechism of the Catholic Church states that "Baptism is necessary for salvation for those to whom the Gospel has been proclaimed and who have had the possibility of asking for this sacrament." The Council of Trent also states in the Decree Concerning Justification from session six that baptism is necessary for salvation. A person who knowingly, willfully and unrepentantly rejects baptism has no hope of salvation. However, if knowledge is absent, "those also can attain to salvation who through no fault of their own do not know the Gospel of Christ or His Church, yet sincerely seek God and moved by grace strive by their deeds to do His will as it is known to them through the dictates of conscience."

The Catechism of the Catholic Church also states: "Since Baptism signifies liberation from sin and from its instigator the devil, one or more exorcisms are pronounced over the candidate". In the Roman Rite of the baptism of a child, the wording of the prayer of exorcism is: "Almighty and ever-living God, you sent your only Son into the world to cast out the power of Satan, spirit of evil, to rescue man from the kingdom of darkness and bring him into the splendour of your kingdom of light. We pray for this child: set him (her) free from original sin, make him (her) a temple of your glory, and send your Holy Spirit to dwell with him (her). Through Christ our Lord."

In the Catholic Church by baptism all sins are forgiven, original sin and all personal sins. Baptism not only purifies from all sins, but also makes the neophyte "a new creature", an adopted son of God, who has become a "partaker of the divine nature", member of Christ and co-heir with him, and a temple of the Holy Spirit. Given once for all, baptism cannot be repeated: just as a man can be born only once, so he is baptized only once. For this reason the holy Fathers added to the Nicene Creed the words We acknowledge one Baptism. Sanctifying grace, the grace of justification, given by God by baptism, erases the original sin and personal actual sins.

The power of Baptism consists in cleansing a man from all his sins as regards both guilt and punishment, for which reason no penance is imposed on those who receive Baptism, no matter how great their sins may have been. And if they were to die immediately after Baptism, they would rise at once to eternal life.

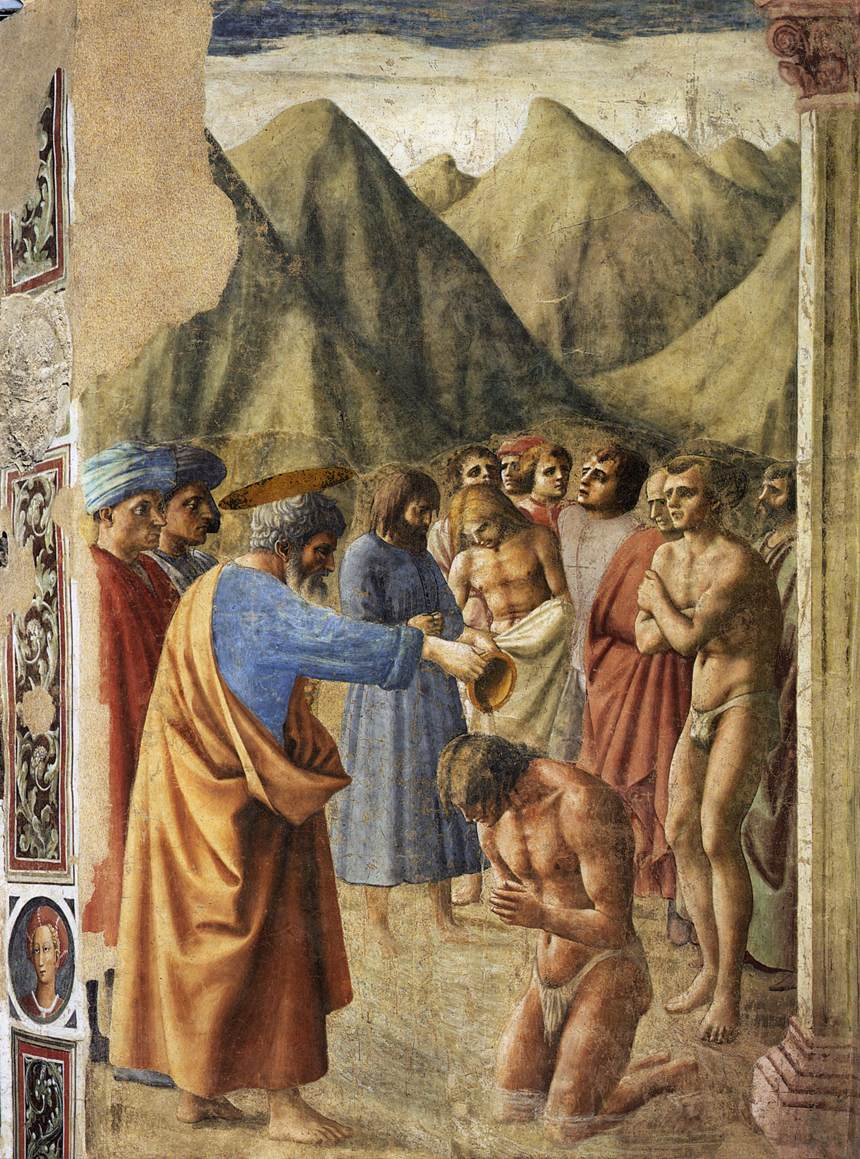
Masaccio, Baptism of the Neophytes, 1425–1426 (Brancacci Chapel, Florence). This painting depicts baptism by affusion. The artist may have chosen an archaic form for this depiction of baptism by St. Peter.

In the Latin Church of the Catholic Church a valid baptism requires, according to Canon 758 of the 1917 Code of Canon Law, the baptizer to pronounce the formula "I baptize you in the name of the Father and of the Son and of the Holy Spirit" while putting the baptized in contact with water. The contact may be immersion, "affusion" (pouring), or "aspersion" (sprinkling). The formula requires "name" to be singular, emphasizing the monotheism of the Trinity. It is claimed that Pope Stephen I, Ambrose, and Pope Nicholas I declared that baptisms in the name of "Jesus" only as well as in the name of "Father, Son, and Holy Spirit" were valid. The correct interpretation of their words is disputed. Current canonical law requires the Trinitarian formula and water for validity. The formula requires "I baptize" rather than "we baptize", as clarified by a responsum of June 24, 2020. In 2022 the Diocese of Phoenix accepted the resignation of a parish priest whose use of "we baptize" had invalidated "thousands of baptisms over more than 20 years". Note that in the Byzantine Rite the formula is in the passive voice, "The servant of God N. is baptized in the Name of the Father, and of the Son, and of the Holy Spirit."

Offspring of practicing Catholic parents are typically baptized as infants. Baptism is part of the Rite of Christian Initiation of Adults, provided for converts from non-Christian backgrounds and others not baptized as infants. Baptism by non-Catholic Christians is valid if the formula and water are present, and so converts from other Christian denominations are not given a Catholic baptism.

The church recognizes two equivalents of baptism with water: "baptism of blood" and "baptism of desire". Baptism of blood is that undergone by unbaptized individuals who are martyred for their faith, while baptism of desire generally applies to catechumens who die before they can be baptized. The Catechism of the Catholic Church describes these two forms:

The Church has always held the firm conviction that those who suffer death for the sake of the faith without having received Baptism are baptized by their death for and with Christ. This Baptism of blood, like the desire for Baptism, brings about the fruits of Baptism without being a sacrament.

— 1258

For catechumens who die before their Baptism, their explicit desire to receive it, together with repentance for their sins, and charity, assures them the salvation that they were not able to receive through the sacrament.

— 1259

The Catholic Church holds that those who are ignorant of Christ's Gospel and of the church, but who seek the truth and do God's will as they understand it, may be supposed to have an implicit desire for baptism and can be saved: "'Since Christ died for all, and since all men are in fact called to one and the same destiny, which is divine, we must hold that the Holy Spirit offers to all the possibility of being made partakers, in a way known to God, of the Paschal mystery.' Every man who is ignorant of the Gospel of Christ and of his Church, but seeks the truth and does the will of God in accordance with his understanding of it, can be saved. It may be supposed that such persons would have desired Baptism explicitly if they had known its necessity." As for unbaptized infants, the church is unsure of their fate; "the Church can only entrust them to the mercy of God".

=== Eastern Orthodoxy ===
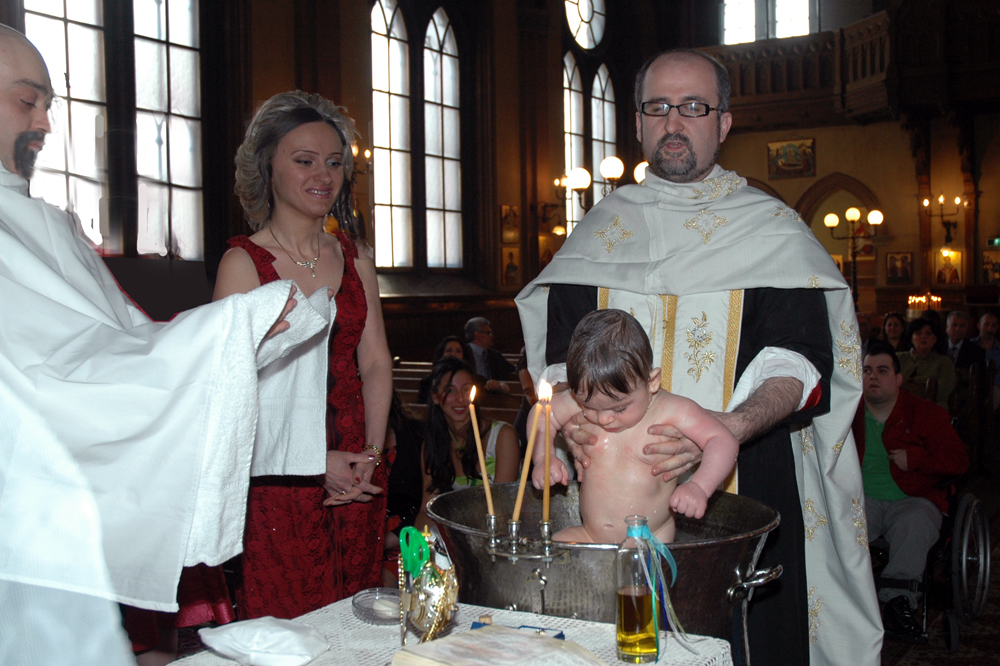
An Orthodox baptism

In Eastern Orthodoxy, baptism is considered a sacrament and mystery which transforms the old and sinful person into a new and pure one, where the old life, the sins, any mistakes made are gone and a clean slate is given. In Greek and Russian Orthodox traditions, it is taught that through Baptism a person is united to the Body of Christ by becoming an official member of the Orthodox Church. During the service, the Orthodox priest blesses the water to be used. The catechumen (the one baptized) is fully immersed in the water three times in the name of the Trinity. This is considered to be a death of the "old man" by participation in the crucifixion and burial of Christ, and a rebirth into new life in Christ by participation in his resurrection. Properly a new name is given, which becomes the person's name.

An Orthodox baptism of an adult

Babies of Orthodox families are normally baptized shortly after birth. Older converts to Orthodoxy are usually rebaptized if the need arises. Those who choose to convert from a different religion to Eastern Orthodoxy typically undergo Chrismation, known as confirmation in the Catholic Church.

Properly and generally, the Mystery of Baptism is administered by bishops and other priests; however, in emergencies any Orthodox Christian can baptize. In such cases, should the person survive the emergency, it is likely that the person will be properly baptized by a priest at some later date. This is not considered to be a second baptism, nor is it imagined that the person is not already Orthodox, but rather it is a fulfillment of the proper form.

The service of baptism in Greek Orthodox (and other Eastern Orthodox) churches has remained largely unchanged for over 1500 years. This fact is witnessed to by Cyril of Jerusalem (d. 386), who, in his Discourse on the Sacrament of Baptism, describes the service in much the same way as is currently in use.

=== Other groups ===
==== Jehovah's Witnesses ====
Jehovah's Witnesses believe that baptism should be performed by complete immersion (submersion) in water and only when an individual is old enough to understand its significance. They believe that water baptism is an outward symbol that a person has made an unconditional dedication through Jesus Christ to do the will of God. Only after baptism is a person considered a full-fledged Witness and an official member of the Christian Congregation. They consider baptism to constitute ordination as a minister.

Prospective candidates for baptism must express their desire to be baptized well in advance of a planned baptismal event, to allow for congregation elders to assess their suitability (regarding true repentance and conversion). Elders approve candidates for baptism if the candidates are considered to understand what is expected of members of the religion and to demonstrate sincere dedication to the faith.

Most baptisms among Jehovah's Witnesses are performed at scheduled assemblies and conventions by elders and ministerial servants, in special pools, or sometimes oceans, rivers, or lakes, depending on circumstances, and rarely occur at local Kingdom Halls. Prior to baptism, at the conclusion of a pre-baptism talk, candidates must affirm two questions:

1. On the basis of the sacrifice of Jesus Christ, have you repented of your sins and dedicated yourself to Jehovah to do his will?
2. Do you understand that your dedication and baptism identify you as one of Jehovah's Witnesses in association with God's spirit-directed organization?

Only baptized males (elders or ministerial servants) may baptize new members. Baptizers and candidates wear swimsuits or other informal clothing for baptism, but are directed to avoid clothing that is considered undignified or too revealing. Generally, candidates are individually immersed by a single baptizer, unless a candidate has special circumstances such as a physical disability. In circumstances of extended isolation, a qualified candidate's dedication and stated intention to become baptized may serve to identify him as a member of Jehovah's Witnesses, even if immersion itself must be delayed. In rare instances, unbaptized males who had stated such an intention have reciprocally baptized each other, with both baptisms accepted as valid. Individuals who had been baptized in the 1930s and 1940s by female Witnesses due to extenuating circumstances, such as in concentration camps, were later re-baptized but still recognized their original baptism dates.

==== The Church of Jesus Christ of Latter-day Saints ====
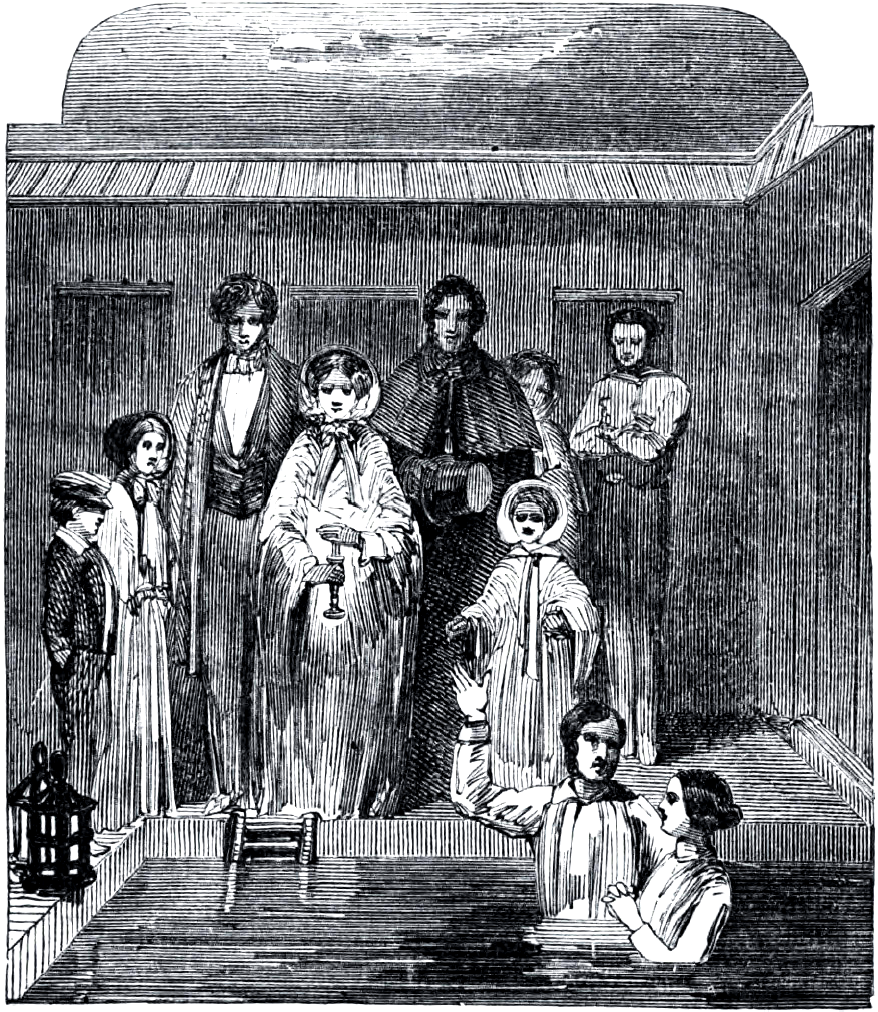
A Mormon baptism, circa the 1850s

In The Church of Jesus Christ of Latter-day Saints (LDS Church), baptism is recognized as the first of several ordinances (rituals) of the gospel. In Mormonism, baptism has the main purpose of remitting the sins of the participant. It is followed by confirmation, which inducts the person into membership in the church and constitutes a baptism with the Holy Spirit. Latter-day Saints believe that baptism must be by full immersion, and by a precise ritualized ordinance: if some part of the participant is not fully immersed, or the ordinance was not recited verbatim, the ritual must be repeated. It typically occurs in a baptismal font.

In addition, members of the LDS Church do not believe a baptism is valid unless it is performed by a Latter-day Saint one who has proper authority (a priest or elder). Authority is passed down through a form of apostolic succession. All new converts to the faith must be baptized or re-baptized. Baptism is seen as symbolic both of Jesus' death, burial, and resurrection and is also symbolic of the baptized individual discarding their "natural" self and donning a new identity as a disciple of Jesus.

According to Latter-day Saint theology, faith and repentance are prerequisites to baptism. The ritual does not cleanse the participant of original sin, as Latter-day Saints do not believe the doctrine of original sin. Mormonism rejects infant baptism and baptism must occur after the age of accountability, defined in Latter-day Saint scripture as eight years old.

Latter-day Saint theology also teaches baptism for the dead in which deceased ancestors are baptized vicariously by the living, and believe that their practice is what Paul wrote of in 1 Corinthians 15:29. This occurs in Latter-day Saint temples.

==== Freemasonry ====
Due to tensions between the Catholic Church and Freemasons in France in the aftermath of the French Revolution, French Freemasons developed rituals to replace those of the Church, including baptism. Chrétien-Guillaume Riebesthal's Rituel Maçonnique pour tous les Rites (Masonic Ritual for All Rites), published in Strasbourg in 1826, includes one such baptismal rite. Lodges in Louisiana and Wisconsin performed baptism ceremonies in 1859, though they were widely condemned by their Grand Lodges.

In 1865, Albert Pike publicly performed a ceremony of Masonic baptism in New York City. The ceremony was greeted with skepticism by many American Masons including Albert Mackey. A ceremony for Masonic baptism for the Scottish Rite was published by Charles T. McClenechan in 1884.

== Nonpractitioners ==
=== Quakers ===
Quakers (members of the Religious Society of Friends) do not believe in the baptism of either children or adults with water, rejecting all forms of outward sacraments in their religious life. Robert Barclay's Apology for the True Christian Divinity (a historic explanation of Quaker theology from the 17th century), explains Quakers' opposition to baptism with water thus:

I indeed baptize you with water unto repentance; but he that cometh after me is mightier than I, whose shoes I am not worthy to bear; he shall baptize you with the Holy Ghost and with fire. Here John mentions two manners of baptizings and two different baptisms, the one with water, and the other with the Spirit, the one whereof he was the minister of, the other whereof Christ was the minister of: and such as were baptized with the first were not therefore baptized with the second: "I indeed baptize you, but he shall baptize you." Though in the present time they were baptized with the baptism of water, yet they were not as yet, but were to be, baptized with the baptism of Christ.

— Robert Barclay, 1678

Barclay argued that water baptism was only something that happened until the time of Christ, but that now, people are baptized inwardly by the spirit of Christ, and hence there is no need for the external sacrament of water baptism, which Quakers argue is meaningless.

=== Salvation Army ===
The Salvation Army does not practice water baptism, or indeed other outward sacraments. William Booth and Catherine Booth, the founders of the Salvation Army, believed that many Christians had come to rely on the outward signs of spiritual grace rather than on grace itself. They believed what was important was spiritual grace itself. However, although the Salvation Army does not practice baptism, they are not opposed to baptism within other Christian denominations.

=== Hyperdispensationalism ===
There are some Christians termed "hyperdispensationalists" (Mid-Acts dispensationalism) who accept only Paul's Epistles as directly applicable for the church today. They do not accept water baptism as a practice for the church since Paul who was God's apostle to the nations was not sent to baptize. Ultradispensationalists (Acts 28 dispensationalism) who do not accept the practice of the Lord's supper, do not practice baptism because these are not found in the Prison Epistles. Both sects believe water baptism was a valid practice for covenant Israel. Hyperdispensationalists also teach that Peter's gospel message was not the same as Paul's. Hyperdispensationalists assert:

- The great commission and its baptism is directed to early Jewish believers, not the Gentile believers of mid-Acts or later.
- The baptism of Acts 2:36–38 is Peter's call for Israel to repent of complicity in the death of their Messiah; not as a Gospel announcement of atonement for sin, a later doctrine revealed by Paul.

Water baptism found early in the Book of Acts is, according to this view, now supplanted by the one baptism foretold by John the Baptist. Others make a distinction between John's prophesied baptism by Christ with the Holy Spirit and the Holy Spirit's baptism of the believer into the body of Christ; the latter being the one baptism for today. The one baptism for today, it is asserted, is the "baptism of the Holy Spirit" of the believer into the Body of Christ church.

Many in this group also argue that John's promised baptism by fire is pending, referring to the destruction of the world by fire.

Other Hyperdispensationalists believe that baptism was necessary until mid-Acts.

=== Debaptism ===
Most Christian churches see baptism as a once-in-a-lifetime event that can be neither repeated nor undone. They hold that those who have been baptized remain baptized, even if they renounce the Christian faith by adopting a non-Christian religion or by rejecting religion entirely. But some other organizations and individuals are practicing debaptism.

== Comparative summary ==
A comparative summary of the practice of baptism throughout various Christian denominations is given below. (This section does not give a complete listing of denominations, and therefore, it only mentions a fraction of the churches practicing "believer's baptism".)

| Denomination | Beliefs about baptism | Type of baptism | Baptize infants? | Baptism regenerates / gives spiritual life | Standard |
|---|---|---|---|---|---|
| Anabaptist | Baptism is considered by the majority of Anabaptist churches (anabaptist means to baptize again) to be essential to Christian faith but not to salvation. It is considered to be an ordinance. | Traditionally by pouring or sprinkling, since the 18th century also immersion and submersion. | No | No. Faith in Christ is believed to precede and follow baptism. | Trinity |
| Anglicanism | "Baptism is not only a sign of profession, and mark of difference, whereby Christian men are discerned from others that be not christened, but it is also a sign of Regeneration or New-Birth, whereby, as by an instrument, they that receive Baptism rightly are grafted into the Church; the promises of the forgiveness of sin, and of our adoption to be the sons of God by the Holy Ghost, are visibly signed and sealed; Faith is confirmed, and Grace increased by virtue of prayer unto God." | Immersion or pouring. | Yes | Yes | Trinity |
| Baptists | A divine ordinance, a symbolic ritual, a mechanism for publicly declaring one's faith, and a sign of having already been saved, but not necessary for salvation. | Submersion only | No | No | Trinity |
| Brethren | Baptism is an ordinance performed upon adults in the name of the Father, Son, and Holy Spirit. It is a commitment to live Christ's teachings responsibly and joyfully. | Immersion only | No | Yes | Trinity |
| Calvary Chapel | Baptism is disregarded as necessary for salvation but instead recognizes as an outward sign of an inward change | Immersion only | No | No | Trinity |
| Christadelphians | Baptism is essential for the salvation of a believer. It is only effective if somebody believes the true gospel message before they are baptized. Baptism is an external symbol of an internal change in the believer: it represents a death to an old, sinful way of life, and the start of a new life as a Christian, summed up as the repentance of the believer—it therefore leads to forgiveness from God, who forgives people who repent. Although someone is only baptized once, a believer must live by the principles of their baptism (i.e., death to sin, and a new life following Jesus) throughout their life. | Submersion only | No | Yes | Father, the Son, and the Holy Spirit (although Christadelphians do not believe in the Nicean trinity) |
| Churches of Christ | Baptism is the remissions for sins, it washes away sins and gives spiritual life; it is a symbolization through the death, burial, and resurrection of Christ. Churches of Christ have historically had the most conservative position on baptism among the various branches of the Restoration Movement, understanding baptism by immersion to be a necessary part of conversion. | Immersion only | No | Yes; because of the belief that baptism is a necessary part of salvation, some Baptists hold that the Churches of Christ endorse the doctrine of baptismal regeneration. However, members of the Churches of Christ reject this, arguing that since faith and repentance are necessary, and that the cleansing of sins is by the blood of Christ through the grace of God, baptism is not an inherently redeeming ritual. Baptism is understood as a confessional expression of faith and repentance, rather than a "work" that earns salvation. | Trinity |
| The Church of Jesus Christ of Latter-day Saints | An ordinance essential to enter the Celestial Kingdom of Heaven and preparatory for receiving the Gift of the Holy Ghost by the laying on of hands. | Immersion, performed by a person holding proper priesthood authority. | No (at least eight years old) | Yes | Father, and the Son, and the Holy Ghost (the LDS Church does not teach a belief in the Nicean Trinity, but rather a belief in the Godhead) |
| Christian Missionary Alliance | Water baptism identifies a person as a disciple of Christ and celebrates the passage from an old life into a new life in Christ. Simply stated, it is an outward sign of an inward change. | Immersion | No | No | Trinity |
| Community Churches | Not necessary for salvation but rather is a sign as a Christ's followers. It is an act of obedience to Christ that follows one's acceptance of salvation by God's grace. Baptism is a symbolization of cleansing of the spirit through God's divine forgiveness and a new life through Christ's death, burial, and resurrection. | Immersion only | No | Yes | Trinity |
| Disciples of Christ | Baptism is a symbolization of Christ's death, burial, and resurrection. It also signifies new birth, cleansing from sin, individual's response to God's grace, and acceptance into the faith community. | Mostly immersion; others pouring. Most Disciples believe that believer's baptism and the practice of immersion were used in the New Testament. | No | Yes | Trinity |
| Eastern Orthodox Church | Baptism is the initiator the salvation experience and for the remissions of sins and is the actual supernatural transformation | Immersion | Yes | Yes | Trinity |
| Evangelical Free Church | An outward expression of an individual's inward faith to God's grace. | Submersion only | No | No | Trinity |
| Foursquare Gospel Church | Baptism is required as a public commitment to Christ's role as Redeemer and King | Immersion only | No | Yes | Trinity |
| Grace Communion International | Baptism proclaims the good news that Christ has made everyone his own and that it is only Him that everybody's new life of faith and obedience merges. | Immersion only | No | Yes | Trinity |
| Jehovah's Witnesses | Baptism is necessary for salvation as part of the entire baptismal arrangement: as an expression of obedience to Jesus' command (Matthew 28:19–20), as a public symbol of the saving faith in the ransom sacrifice of Jesus Christ (Romans 10:10), and as an indication of repentance from dead works and the dedication of one's life to Jehovah. (1 Peter 2:21) However, baptism does not guarantee salvation. | Submersion only; typical candidates are baptized at district and circuit conventions. | No | No | In the name of the Father (Jehovah), the Son (Jesus Christ) and the holy spirit. Jehovah's Witnesses do not believe in the trinity but view Jehovah as Sovereign God Almighty; Jesus as God's firstborn only-begotten son, second only to Jehovah himself in authority, who now reigns as the anointed king of God's Messianic Kingdom; and the holy spirit as God's active force or the force by which God causes things to happen. |
| Lutherans | The entry sacrament into the church by which a person receives forgiveness of sins and eternal salvation | Sprinkling, pouring, or immersion | Yes | Yes | Trinity |
| Methodists and Wesleyans | The sacrament of initiation into Christ's holy church whereby one is incorporated into the covenant of grace and given new birth through water and the spirit. Baptism washes away sin and clothes one in the righteousness of Christ. It is a visible sign and seal of inward regeneration. | Sprinkling, pouring, or immersion | Yes | Yes, although contingent upon repentance and a personal acceptance of Christ as Savior. | Trinity |
| Metropolitan Community Church | Baptism is conducted in the order of worship. | Sprinkling, pouring, or immersion | Yes | Yes | Trinity |
| Moravian Church | The individual receives the pledge of the forgiveness of sins and admission through God's covenant through the blood of Jesus Christ | Sprinkling, pouring, or immersion | Yes | Yes | Trinity |
| Nazarenes | Baptism signifies the acceptance of Christ Jesus as Savior and are willingly to obey him righteously and in holiness. | Sprinkling, pouring, or immersion | Yes | Yes | Trinity |
| Oneness Pentecostals | Necessary for salvation because it conveys spiritual rebirth. Being baptized is an ordinance directed and established by Jesus and the Apostles. | Submersion. Also stress the necessity of a baptism of the Holy Spirit (Acts 2:38; 8:14–17, 35–38). | No | Yes | Jesus |
| Pentecostals (Trinitarian) (Note: Assemblies of God, Church of God of Prophecy, and Church of God in Christ) | Water Baptism is an ordinance, a symbolic ritual used to witness to having accepted Christ as personal Savior. | Submersion. Also stress the necessity of a "second" Baptism of a special outpouring from the Holy Spirit. | No | Varies | Trinity |
| Reformed (includes Presbyterian churches) | A sacrament and means of grace. A sign and a seal of the remission of sins, regeneration, admission into the visible church, and the covenant of grace. It is an outward sign of an inward grace. | Sprinkling, pouring, immersion or submersion | Yes | Yes, the outward means by which the Holy Spirit inwardly accomplishes regeneration and remission of sins | Trinity |
| Quakers (Religious Society of Friends) | Only an external symbol that is no longer to be practiced | – (none): do not believe in Baptism of water, but only in an inward, ongoing purification of the human spirit in a life of discipline led by the Holy Spirit. | – | – | – |
| Catholic Church (Eastern and Western Rites) | Necessary for salvation for those to whom the Gospel has been proclaimed. Though God has bound salvation to the sacrament of Baptism, but he himself is not bound by his sacraments. (CCC 1257). It erases the original and all personal sins. The sanctifying grace, the grace of justification is given by God through baptism. | Usually by pouring in the West, by submersion or immersion in the East; sprinkling admitted only if the water then flows on the head. | Yes | Yes, as explained in the Catechism of the Catholic Church (CCC 1265) Baptism not only purifies from all sins, but also makes the neophyte "a new creature", an adopted son of God, who has become a "partaker of the divine nature",^{(2 Cor 5:17; 2 Pet 1:4; cf. Gal 4:5–7),}member of Christ and co-heir with him,^{(Cf. 1 Cor 6:15; 12:27; Rom 8:17),} and a temple of the Holy Spirit ^{(Cf. 1 Cor 6:19).} | Trinity |
| Seventh-day Adventists | Not stated as the prerequisite to salvation, but a prerequisite for becoming a member of the church, although nonmembers are still accepted in the church. It symbolizes death to sin and new birth in Jesus Christ. "It affirms joining the family of God and sets one apart for a life of ministry." | Immersion | No | No | Trinity |
| United Church of Christ (Evangelical and Reformed Churches and the Congregational Christian Churches) | One of two sacraments. Baptism is an outward sign of God's inward grace. It may or may not be necessary for membership in a local congregation. However, it is a common practice for both infants and adults. | Sprinkling, pouring, immersion or submersion. | Yes | No | Trinity |
| United Church of God | Through the laying on hands with prayer, the baptized believer receives the Holy Spirit and becomes a part of the spiritual body of Jesus Christ. | Immersion only | No | No | Father, Son, and Holy Spirit (although members of the United Church of God doctrinally believe in Binitarianism believing that the Holy Spirit is a power of God and Jesus Christ rather than a separate person) |
| Vineyard Churches | A public expression of faith for a person who has committed to follow Jesus. It also symbolizes a person's cleansing of sin and gives a person a chance to openly profess their faith in front of the church, friends, and family. | Immersion only | No (at least six years old) | Yes | Trinity |

== Baptism of objects ==
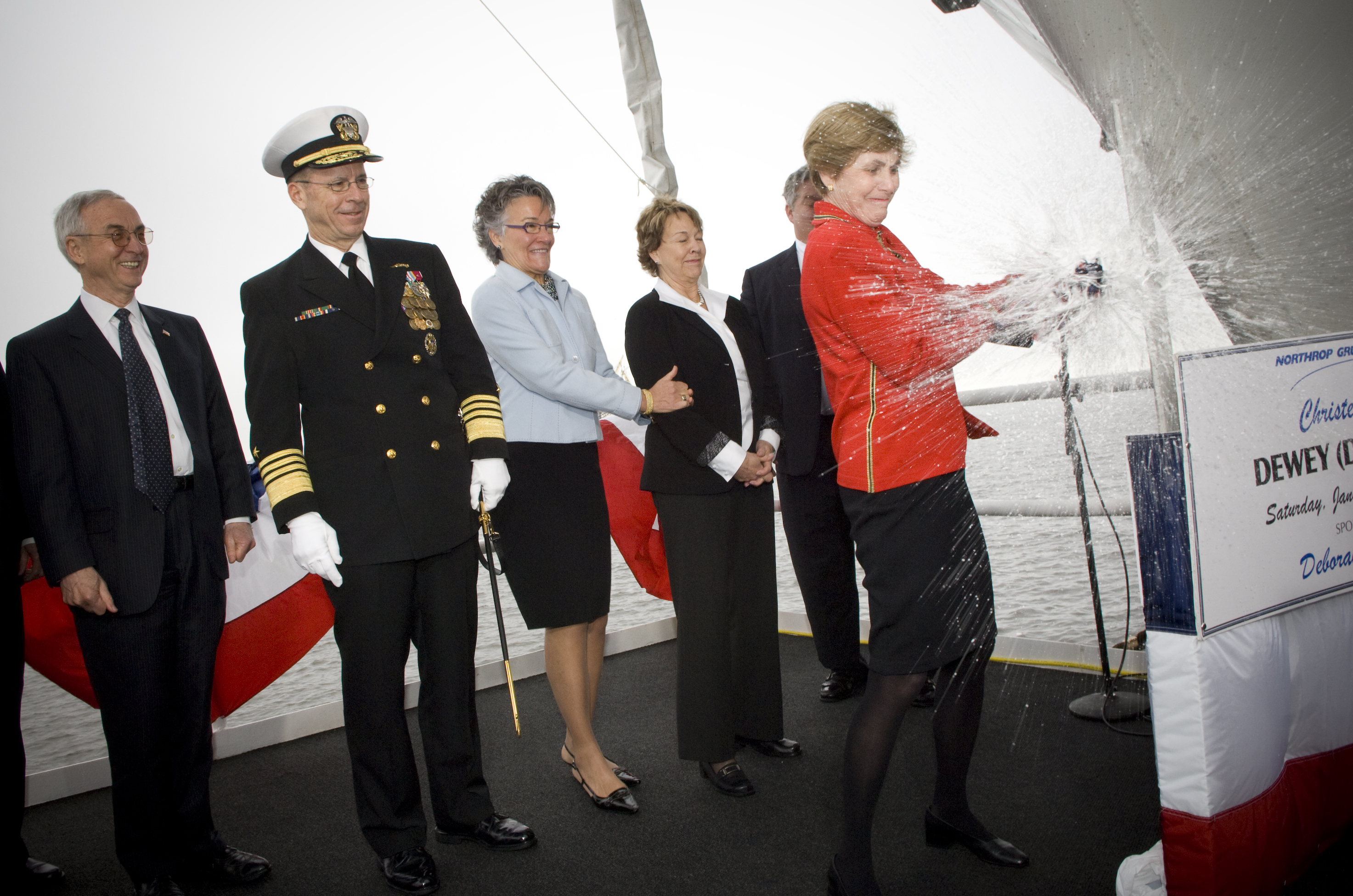
Christening of USS Dewey

The word "baptism" or "christening" is sometimes used to describe the naming or inauguration of certain objects for use.

=== Boats and ships ===
Baptism of Ships: since at least the time of the Crusades, rituals have contained a blessing for ships. The priest asks God to bless the vessel and protect those who sail on it. The ship is usually sprinkled with holy water.

The christening process also involves many traditions intended to invite good luck, such as breaking a sacrificial bottle of champagne over the bow as the ship is named aloud and launched.

=== Church bells ===
The name Baptism of Bells has been given to the blessing of (musical, especially church) bells, at least in France, since the 11th century. It is derived from the washing of the bell with holy water by the bishop, before he anoints it with the oil of the infirm without and with chrism within; a fuming censer is placed under it and the bishop prays that these sacramentals of the church may, at the sound of the bell, put the demons to flight, protect from storms, and call the faithful to prayer.

=== Dolls ===
"Baptism of Dolls": the custom of 'dolly dunking' was once a common practice in parts of the United Kingdom, particularly in Cornwall where it has been revived in recent years.

== Other initiation ceremonies ==
Many cultures practice or have practiced initiation rites, with or without the use of water, including the ancient Egyptian, the Hebraic/Jewish, the Babylonian, the Mayan, and the Norse cultures. The modern Japanese practice of Miyamairi is such a ceremony that does not use water. In some, such evidence may be archaeological and descriptive in nature, rather than a modern practice.

=== Mystery religion initiation rites ===
Many scholars have drawn parallels between rites from mystery religions and baptism in Christianity.

Dutch historian Jan N. Bremmer has written on the putative connection between rites from mystery religions and baptism:

There are thus some verbal parallels between early Christianity and the Mysteries, but the situation is rather different as regards early Christian ritual practice. Much ink was spilled around 1900 arguing that the rituals of baptism and of the Last Supper derived from the ancient Mysteries, but Nock and others after him have easily shown that these attempts grossly misinterpreted the sources.

Baptism is clearly rooted in Jewish purificatory rituals, and cult meals are so widespread in antiquity that any specific derivation is arbitrary. It is truly surprising to see how long the attempts to find some pagan background to these two Christian sacraments have persevered.

Secularizing ideologies clearly played an important part in these interpretations but, nevertheless, they have helped to clarify the relations between nascent Christianity and its surroundings.

Apuleius, a 2nd-century Roman writer, described an initiation into the mysteries of the goddess Isis. The initiation was preceded by a normal bathing in the public baths and a ceremonial sprinkling by the priest of Isis, after which the candidate was given secret instructions in the temple of the goddess. The candidate then fasted for ten days from meat and wine, after which he was dressed in linen and led at night into the innermost part of the sanctuary, where the actual initiation took place, the details of which were secret. On the next two days, dressed in the robes of his consecration, he participated in feasting.

Apuleius also describes an initiation into the cult of Osiris, and yet a third initiation, of the same pattern as the initiation into the cult of Isis, without mention of a preliminary bathing. The water-less initiations of Lucius, the character in Apuleius's story who had been turned into an ass and changed back into human form by Isis, into the successive degrees of the rites of the goddess was accomplished only after a significant period of study to demonstrate his loyalty and trustworthiness, akin to catechumenal practices preceding baptism in Christianity.

Thus the practice is derivative, whether from Judaism, the Mysteries or a combination (see the reference to Hellenistic Judaism in the Etymology section.)

=== Gnostic Catholicism and Thelema ===
The Ecclesia Gnostica Catholica, or Gnostic Catholic Church (the ecclesiastical arm of Ordo Templi Orientis), offers its Rite of Baptism to any person at least 11 years old.

=== Mandaean baptism ===
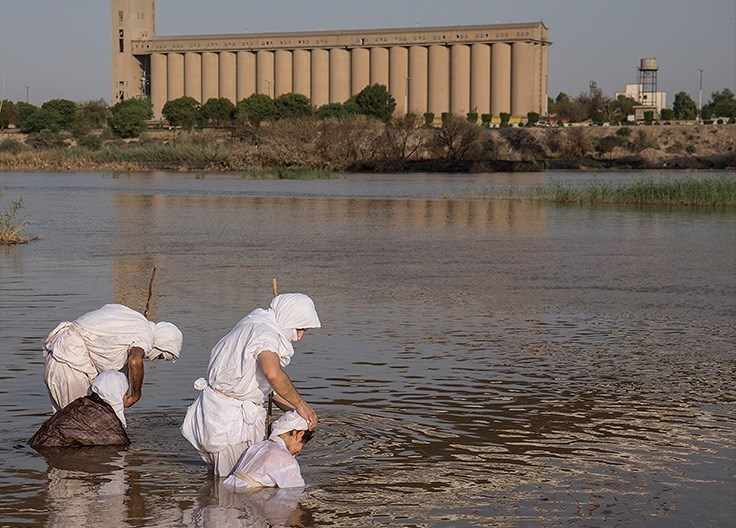
Mandaeans undergoing baptism (masbuta) in the Karun River, Ahvaz, Iran

Mandaeans revere John the Baptist and practice frequent baptism (masbuta) as a ritual of purification, not of initiation. They are possibly the earliest people to practice baptism. Mandaeans undergo baptism on Sundays (Habshaba), wearing a white sacral robe (rasta). Baptism for Mandaeans consists of a triple full immersion in water, a triple signing of the forehead with water and a triple drinking of water. The priest (Rabbi) then removes a ring made of myrtle worn by the baptized and places it on their forehead. This is then followed by a handshake (kushta, "hand of truth") with the priest. The final blessing involves the priest laying his right hand on the baptized person's head. Living water (fresh, natural, flowing water) is a requirement for baptism, therefore can only take place in rivers. All rivers are named Jordan (yardena) and are believed to be nourished by the World of Light. By the river bank, a Mandaean's forehead is anointed with sesame oil (misha) and partakes in a communion of bread (pihta) and water. Baptism for Mandaeans allows for salvation by connecting with the World of Light and for forgiveness of sins.

=== Sethian baptism ===
The Sethian baptismal rite is known as the Five Seals, in which the initiate is immersed five times in running water.

=== Yazidi baptism ===
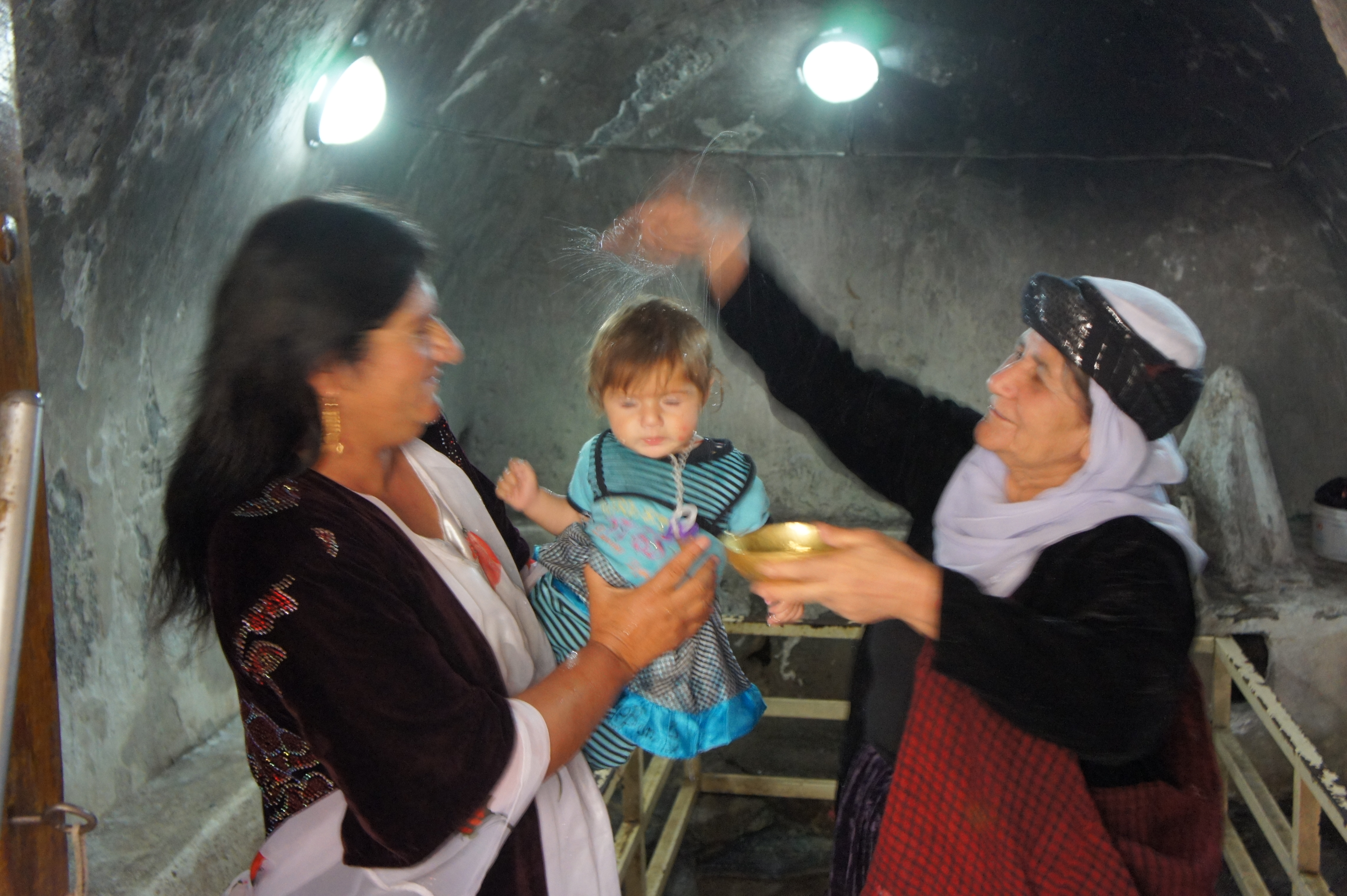
Baptism of a Yazidi child in Lalish

Yazidi baptism is called mor kirin (literally: "to seal"). Traditionally, Yazidi children are baptized at birth with water from the Kaniya Sipî ("White Spring") at Lalish. It essentially consists of pouring holy water from the spring on the child's head three times.

=== Islamic practice of wudu ===
Many Islamic scholars such as Shaikh Bawa Muhaiyaddeen have compared the Islamic practice of wudu to a baptism. Wudu is a practice that Muslims practice to go from ritual impurity to ritual purity. Ritual purity is required for salah (praying) and also to hold a physical copy of the Qur’an, and so wudu is often done before salah. However, it is permissible to pray more than one salah without repeating wudu, as long as ritual purity is not broken, for example by using the bathroom.

Another similar purification ritual is ghusl, which takes someone from major ritual impurity (janabah) to lesser ritual impurity, which is then purified by wudu. If one is in a state of janabah, both ghusl and wudu are required if one wants to pray.

Although original sin does not exist in Islam, wudu is widely regarded to remove sins. In a Sahih hadith, Muhammad says "Whenever a man performs his ablution intending to pray and he washes his hands, the sins of his hands fall down with the first drop. When he rinses his mouth and nose, the sins of his tongue and lips fall down with the first drop. When he washes his face, the sins of his hearing and sight fall down with the first drop. When he washes his arms to his elbows and his feet to his ankles, he is purified from every sin and fault like the day he was born from his mother. If he stands for prayer, Allah will raise his status by a degree. If he sits, he will sit in peace."

=== Baptism in the Yadav community ===
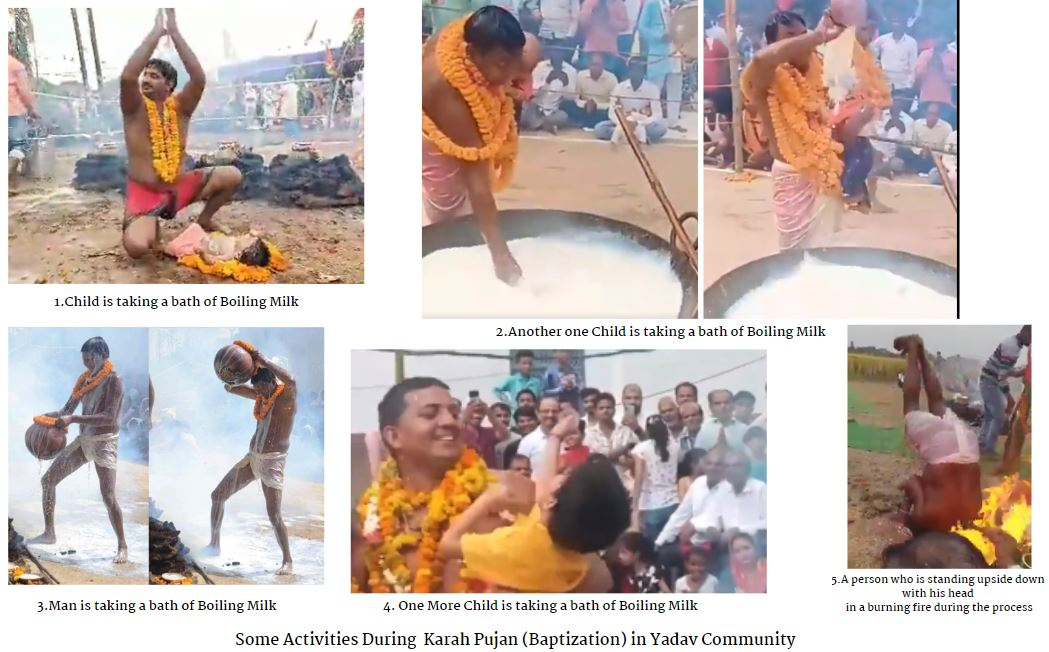
Different activities During process

People of the Yadav community of Hindu religion follow baptism, where it is called Karah Pujan. In this, the person who is being baptized is bathed in boiling milk. The newborn baby is also included in this process, in which he is bathed with boiling milk and then he is garlanded with flowers.

== See also ==
- Amrit Sanskar, in Sikhism
- Baptism by fire
- Baptismal font
- Baptistery
- Chrism
- Christifideles laici
- Consolamentum
- Disciple (Christianity)
- Divine filiation
- Ghusl
- Holy water in Eastern Christianity
- Mikvah
- Misogi
- Prevenient grace
- Ritual purification
- Theophany
- Water and religion
