= Comparison of Ancient Greek dictionaries =

The following tables compare Ancient Greek dictionaries, in any language.

== General dictionaries ==
Title	Publisher/author	First published	Latest edition	Year	Pages	Entries (approx.)	Source citations	Volumes	Translation language	Period covered	Notes
Thesaurus Graecae Linguae	Henri Estienne	1572						5	Latin		
Kritisches griechisch-deutsches Handwörterbuch	Johann Gottlob Schneider	1797							German		
Handwörterbuch der griechischen Sprache	Franz Passow	1819	4th	1831					German		
Griechisch-Deutsches Handwörterbuch	Wilhelm Pape	1842							German		
A Greek–English Lexicon	Liddell, Scott, Jones, Roderick McKenzie	1843	9th	1940 (9th edition), 1996 (supplement)	2,042, plus 320 pages of the 1996 supplement	116,502			English	8th c. BCE – 2nd c. CE	
Dictionnaire grec-français	Anatole Bailly	1895	26th	2020	2,230	107,809		1	French		
A Lexicon of the Homeric Dialect	Richard John Cunliffe	1924	3	2012	427, plus 64 supplemental	9809	>46,900	1	English	Homeric	
Vocabolario greco-italiano	Lorenzo Rocci	1939	3rd	1943	2,074	150,000		1	Italian		In 2011 a new edition was released with restyled graphics and some corrections and modernizations
Старогръцко-български речникъ	Mihail Vojnov et al.	1939	4th	1992	917			1	Bulgarian	8th c. BCE – 4th c. CE	
Древнегреческо-русский словарь	Iosif Dvoretsky	1958			1,904	70,000		2	Russian	8th c. BCE – 2nd c. CE	
Słownik grecko-polski	Zofia Abramowiczówna (ed.)	1958–1965			2,889			4	Polish		
A Patristic Greek Lexicon	Geoffrey Hugo Lampe	1961			1,568			1	English	2nd c. CE – 9th c. CE	
Diccionario Griego-Español	Spanish National Research Council	1980		2019	1,953 (up to ἐπισκήνωσις, vol. VIII)			8 (up to ἐπισκήνωσις)	Spanish	Mycenaean - 6th c. CE	In progress, up to ἐπισκήνωσις.
GI - Vocabolario della lingua greca	Franco Montanari	1995	4rd	2025	2,760	140,000+		1	Italian	8th c. BCE – 6th c. CE	
Cambridge Greek Lexicon	James Diggle et al., Cambridge University Press	2021			1,500 approx	37,000+		2	English	8th c. BCE – 2nd c. CE (up to Plutarch)	

=== Translated general dictionaries ===
Title	Publisher/author	First published	Latest edition	Year	Pages	Entries (approx.)	Source citations	Volumes	Translation language	Period covered	Translation from
Grčko-hrvatski rječnik za škole	Stjepan Senc	1910			1,022	>30,000		1	Croatian		G.E. Benseler & A. Kaegi, Griechisch-deutsches Schulwörterbuch
Dizionario illustrato greco-italiano	Liddell, Scott, Jones, McKenzie, Q. Cataudella, M. Manfredi, F. Di Benedetto	1975			1,568	>35,000		1	Italian		Middle Liddell
GE -The Brill Dictionary of Ancient Greek	Franco Montanari, Madeleine Goh, Chad Schroeder	2015			2,431	140,000		1	English	8th c. BCE – 6th c. CE	Italian 3rd edition
GD - Wörterbuch Griechisch-Deutsch	Franco Montanari, Michael Meier-Brügger, Paul Dräger	2023			2,990	140,000		1	German	8th c. BCE – 6th c. CE	Italian 3rd edition
Σύγχρονο λεξικό της αρχαίας ελληνικής γλώσσας	Franco Montanari, Αντώνιος Ρεγκάκος	2013	3rd	2018	2,446	140,000		1	Modern Greek	8th c. BCE – 6th c. CE	Italian 3rd edition

== Etymological dictionaries ==
Title	Author	First published	Latest edition	Pages	Entries (approx.)	Volumes	Translation language	Online
Etymologisches Wörterbuch der Griechischen Sprache	Walther Prellwitz	1892	1905 (2nd)	382		1	German	scan at Google Books
Dictionnaire étymologique de la langue grecque	Émile Boisacq	1907–1916	1938 (3rd)	1,123		1	French	scan at Internet Archive
Etymologisches Wörterbuch des Griechischen	Johann Baptist Hofmann	1949	1971 (3rd)	433		1	German	
Griechisches etymologisches Wörterbuch	Hjalmar Frisk	1960–1972		2,404	6,530	3	German	digitised text (Leiden University)
Dictionnaire étymologique de la langue grecque: Historie des mots	Pierre Chantraine	1968	2009	1,436+ 78pp. supplement		4 (in a single vol. in 2009)	French	
Etymological Dictionary of Greek	Robert Beekes	2009		1,808+ 64pp. introduction	7,500	2	English	

== Onomastic dictionaries ==
Title	Publisher/author	First published	Latest edition	Year	Pages	Entries (approx.)	Source citations	Volumes	Translation language	Period covered	Notes
Wörterbuch der griechischen Eigennamen	Wilhelm Pape, Gustav Eduard Benseler	1842	3rd	1884	1,710			2	German		
Die historischen Personennamen des Griechischen bis zur Kaiserzeit	Friedrich Bechtel	1917			637			1	German		
Lexicon of Greek Personal Names	Peter Fraser, Elaine Matthews	1987–2018			3,800			5 (in 9 issues) + 1 Annex	English		
