= Logeion =

Database for Latin and Ancient Greek dictionaries

Logeion is an open-access database of Latin and Ancient Greek dictionaries. Developed by Josh Goldenberg and Matt Shanahan in 2011, it is hosted by the University of Chicago. Apart from simultaneous search capabilities across different dictionaries and reference works, Logeion offers access to frequency and collocation data from the Perseus Project.

== Features ==
Having started out as an aggregator for Latin and Ancient Greek dictionaries, Logeion has implemented multiple new features in its development. These include:

- the integration of reference works on antiquity;
- frequency and collocation data from the Perseus Project;
- corpus examples, equally retrieved from the Perseus Project;
- references to relevant chapters in a number of (English-language) textbooks.

Furthermore, an iOS app was developed by Joshua Day in 2013. The app's second version, launched in 2018, is also available for Android devices.

== Dictionaries ==
As of June 2026, Logeion contains the following dictionaries.

=== Dictionaries with full-text search ===
==== Ancient Greek dictionaries ====
- Autenrieth, G. (1891). A Homeric Dictionary for Schools and Colleges. New York: Harper and Brothers.
- Liddell, H. G., & Scott, R. (1889). An Intermediate Greek Lexicon. Oxford: Clarendon Press.
- Liddell, H. G., Scott, R., Jones, H. S., & McKenzie, R. (1940). A Greek-English Lexicon. Oxford: Clarendon Press.
- Slater, W. L. (1969). Lexicon to Pindar. Berlin: De Gruyter.

==== Latin dictionaries ====
- Lewis, Ch. T., & Short, Ch. (1879). A Latin Dictionary. Oxford: Clarendon Press.
- Lewis, Ch. T. (1890). An Elementary Latin Dictionary. New York: American Book Company.

=== Dictionaries without full-text search ===
==== Ancient Greek dictionaries ====
- Abbot-Smith, G. (1922). A Manual Greek Lexicon of the New Testament. New York: Charles Schribner's Sons.
- Adrados, F. R., & Somolinos, J. R. (Eds.). Diccionario Griego-Español. Madrid: CSIC.
- Bailly, A; Gréco, G.; Charbonnet, A.; de Wilde, M.; Maréchal, B. (2020). Dictionnaire grec-français. (4th ed.).
- Cunliffe, R. J. (1963). A Lexicon of the Homeric dialect. Norman, Oklahoma : University of Oklahoma Press.
- Montanari, F. (2015). The Brill Dictionary of Ancient Greek. English Edition edited by Madeleine Goh and Chad Schroeder, under the auspices of the Center for Hellenic Studies, Harvard University. Leiden; Boston: Brill, 2015.
- Muñoz Delgado, L. (2001). Léxico de magia y religión en los papiros mágicos griegos. Madrid: CSIC.
- Pape, W. (1880). Handwörterbuch der griechischen sprache. Braunschweig, F. Vieweg & Sohn.
- Sluiter, I.; van Beek, L.; Kessels, T.; Rijksbaron, A. (2024). Woordenboek Grieks/Nederlands. Amsterdam: Amsterdam University Press.

==== Latin dictionaries ====
- Babeliowsky, J. K. L., den Hengst, D., Holtland, W., van Lakwijk, W., Marcelis, J. Th. K., Pinkster, H., Smolenaars, J. J. L. (1975). Basiswoordenlijst Latijn. Den Haag: Staatsuitgeverij.
- Du Cange, Ch. et al. (1883-1887). Glossarium mediae et infimae latinitatis. Niort: L. Favre.
- Frieze, H. S. (1902). Vergil’s Aeneid Books I-XII, with an Introduction, Notes, and Vocabulary, revised by Walter Dennison. New York: American Book Company.
- Gaffiot, F. (1934). Dictionnaire Illustré Latin-Français. Paris: Hachette.
- Gonçalves, J. A. (1936). Lexicon magnum Latino-Sinicum. 3rd edition. Peking: Typis Congregationis Missionis.
- Latham, R. E., Howlett, D. R., & Ashdowne, R. K. (1975-2013). The Dictionary of Medieval Latin from British Sources. London: British Academy.
- Pinkster, H. (Ed.) (2018). Woordenboek Latijn/Nederlands. Amsterdam: Amsterdam University Press.

== Reference works ==
- NA (n.d.). The Perseus Encyclopedia. Medford, MA: Tufts University.
- Peck, H. Th. (1898). Harper's Dictionary of Classical Antiquities. New York: Harper and Brothers.
- Smith, W. (1854). Dictionary of Greek and Roman Geography. London: Walter and Maberly; John Murray.
- Smith, W., Wayte, W., & Marindin, G. E. (1890). Dictionary of Greek and Roman Antiquities. London: John Murray.
- Stilwell, R. (1976). The Princeton Encyclopedia of Classical Sites. Princeton: Princeton University Press.

== See also ==
- List of academic databases and search engines
