= Dish-bearers and butlers in Anglo-Saxon England =

Royal officials in Anglo-Saxon England

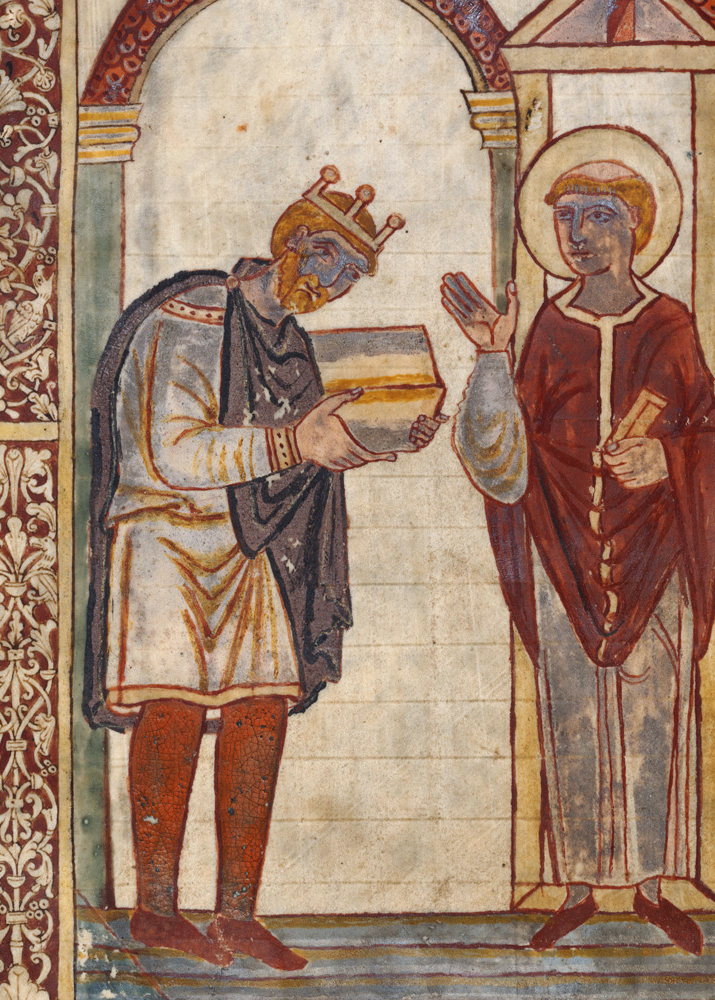
Contemporary portrait of King Æthelstan presenting a book to St Cuthbert

Dish-bearers (often called seneschals by historians) and butlers (or cup-bearers) were thegns who acted as personal attendants of kings in Anglo-Saxon England. Royal feasts played an important role in consolidating community and hierarchy among the elite, and dish-bearers and butlers served the food and drinks at these meals. Thegns were members of the aristocracy, leading landowners who occupied the third lay (non-religious) rank in English society after the king and ealdormen. Dish-bearers and butlers probably also carried out diverse military and administrative duties as required by the king. Some went on to have illustrious careers as ealdormen, but most never rose higher than thegn.

== Etymology ==
The chief attendants at Anglo-Saxon royal feasts were dish-bearers and butlers or cup-bearers. Dish-bearer in Medieval Latin (ML) is discifer or dapifer, and in Old English (OE) discþegn, also discðegn and discþen (dish-thegn). The French medievalist Alban Gautier states: "Both discifer and dapifer literally mean 'dish-bearer', but in the first case 'dish' should be understood as the disc-shaped object (discus), whereas in the second it refers to the culinary preparation that was inside (dapes)." The Dictionary of Medieval Latin from British Sources (DMLBS) defines discifer as dish-bearer or sewer, (Note: The Oxford English Dictionary gives a historical definition of sewer as "an attendant at a meal who superintended the arrangement of the table, the seating of the guests, and the tasting and serving of the dishes".) and dapifer as an attendant at meals, a sewer or a steward. Historians often translate discifer as seneschal, but Gautier objects that the word seneschal is not recorded in England before the Norman Conquest. According to the twelfth-century chronicler, John of Worcester, in 946 King Edmund I was killed trying to protect his dapifer from assault by an outlaw. The editors of John's chronicle translate dapifer as 'steward', but the historian Ann Williams prefers 'seneschal'. Tenth- and eleventh-century charters are sometimes attested by several dapiferi or disciferi, suggesting teams of officers, whereas the will of Eadred mentions one discðegn and several stigweard ('subordinate officers', literally 'guardians of the enclosure'), who may have been the head and his deputies. Butler or cup-bearer in ML is pincerna, OE byrele (or birele, byrle, biriele). An officer in charge of drinks was generally described as a pincerna and one in dealing with food as a discifer or dapifer, and Gautier calls them "officers of the mouth".

== Role ==
Royal feasts played an important part in consolidating community and hierarchy in the Anglo-Saxon elite. Dish-bearers and cup-bearers (butlers), who served at the table, played a major role in helping to make them political successes. Some feasts were compulsory drinking parties, such as the dinner held by Bishop Æthelwold at Abingdon for King Eadred in about 954: the King ordered that the mead should flow plentifully, the doors were locked so that no one could leave, and Northumbrian thegns in the King's entourage got drunk. There may have been teams of dish-bearers and butlers, under the supervision of two of them. They were probably versatile servants of the king, who carried out diverse administrative and military duties as required.

In the later Anglo-Saxon period, queens and æthelings (sons of kings) also had dish-bearers. In the early 990s, when King Æthelred the Unready had several infant children, Æfic was dish-bearer to the æthelings, suggesting that they jointly had a household with one dish-bearer. When they grew up, each would have had their own retinue with a dish-bearer, and probably a butler. In 1014 Æthelred's eldest son Æthelstan left eight hides of land and a horse to his discþene in his will. The dish-bearer of Æthelstan's younger brother Edmund (the future King Edmund Ironside) attested a charter at a time when Æthelstan was still alive, showing that kings' younger sons also had dish-bearers.

== Status ==
Dish-bearers and butlers had a high status in the hierarchy of the court. The offices were held by thegns, who were the third lay rank of the aristocracy. To be a thegn, a man had to at least be a substantial local landowner, and he could be a major magnate owning estates in several counties. He would be expected to perform military and administrative functions. A few were promoted to ealdorman, the top level of the lay aristocracy below the king. According to the historian Simon Keynes, "collectively, the thegns were the very fabric of social and political order". Kings and ealdormen could exploit their positions, "but in the final analysis it was the thegns who counted".

The order of attestations in charters was an indication of status, and dish-bearers and butlers usually attested charters above ordinary thegns. (Note: Thegns usually attested charters as ML minister.) In King Eadred's will, the discðegne, hræglðegne (Note: The rail-thegn (OE hræglðegn) or chamber-thegn (OE burðegn), was another thegnly office at royal courts. In ML it is cubicularius, defined by DMLBS as "bedroom attendant, chamberlain", or camerarius "attendant in charge of private chamber, chamberlain".) and biriele are listed immediately after the ealdormen and bishops. No dish-bearer or butler witnessed charters of two successive kings with mention of his office, suggesting that his position was a personal one which ended with the king's death. The butler and dish-bearer of Edith, wife of Edward the Confessor, remained close to her when the King died and did not move to serve the new queen.

== History ==
The main evidence for the posts of dish-bearer and butler is provided by witness lists to charters. (Note: Gautier provides a full list of designations as dish-bearer and butler in witnesses to Anglo-Saxon charters.) The offices may have been copied from the equivalent Frankish offices, but the sources for the early Anglo-Saxon period are few and problematic and the evidence is too limited to be certain. Between 741 and 809 pincernae attested charters of Kent, the Hwicce and Mercia, and in 785 Eatta attested a charter of Offa of Mercia as "dux et regis discifer" (ealdorman and king's dish-bearer), but all later attestations of dish-bearers and butlers are in West Saxon and English charters. In Wessex in the early ninth century, members of great families sought positions as dish-bearers and butlers, and Alfred the Great's maternal grandfather was a famous pincerna. In Alfred's own reign, the offices could be a step in an illustrious noble career. Alfred's pincerna in 892, Sigewulf, later became an ealdorman and died fighting against the Vikings at the Battle of the Holme in 902.

In the tenth century, most dish-bearers and butlers were thegns of lesser status who never rose higher, but some members of leading families held the post before becoming ealdormen. Wulfgar and Odda were dish-bearers and leading thegns under King Æthelstan, and were promoted to ealdorman by his successor, Edmund. In 956/57, Ælfheah, who was later to be ealdorman of central Wessex, attested one charter as discifer and another as cyninges [king's] discðegn. Æthelmær, a leading magnate, founder of two abbeys and descendant of King Æthelred I, was discþen to Æthelred the Unready. Æthelmaær's father was Æthelweard, Ealdorman of the Western Provinces, and when he died in 998 Æthelmaær did not succeed as ealdorman, perhaps because he preferred to retain his influential position at court. Under Edward the Confessor, members of the families who held most of the earldoms, those of Godwin and Leofric, did not become dish-bearers or butlers, and the positions may have become less attractive to the greatest aristocrats when they were more powerful than the court. In the 1060s, a new rank of staller was created between thegns and earls (Note: From the reign of Cnut onwards, ealdormen were called earls.), and men with this rank could hold the office of dish-bearer.

== Sources ==
- Brooks, Nicholas; Kelly, Susan, eds. (2013). Charters of Christ Church Canterbury Part 2. Anglo-Saxon Charters. Oxford: Oxford University Press for the British Academy. ISBN 978-0-19-726536-9.
- "Charter S 597". The Electronic Sawyer: Online Catalogue of Anglo-Saxon Charters. London: King's College London.
- "Charter S 1292". The Electronic Sawyer: Online Catalogue of Anglo-Saxon Charters. London: King's College London.
- "Charter S 1422". The Electronic Sawyer: Online Catalogue of Anglo-Saxon Charters. London: King's College London.
- "Charter S 1454". The Electronic Sawyer: Online Catalogue of Anglo-Saxon Charters. London: King's College London.
- "Charter S 1503". The Electronic Sawyer: Online Catalogue of Anglo-Saxon Charters. London: King's College London.
- "Charter S 1515". The Electronic Sawyer: Online Catalogue of Anglo-Saxon Charters. London: King's College London.
- Darlington, R. R.; McGurk, Patrick, eds. (1995). "Oxford Medieval Texts: The Chronicle of John of Worcester, Vol. 2: The Annals from 450 to 1066". The Chronicle of John of Worcester (in Latin and English). Vol. 2. Oxford: Clarendon Press. doi:10.1093/actrade/9780198222613.book.1. ISBN 978-0-19-822261-3.
- Gautier, Alban (May 2017). "Butlers and Dish-Bearers in Anglo-Saxon Courts: Household Officers at the Royal Table" (PDF). Historical Research. 90 (248). Oxford: Oxford University Press: 269–295. doi:10.1111/1468-2281.12181. ISSN 0950-3471. S2CID 159587154.
- Harmer, Florence, ed. (1914). Select English Historical Documents of the Ninth and Tenth Centuries. Cambridge: Cambridge University Press. OCLC 875733891.
- Howlett, David (2007). Dictionary of Medieval Latin from British Sources: Phi-Pos. Vol. XI. Oxford: Oxford University Press for the British Academy. ISBN 978-0-19-726421-8.
- Keynes, Simon (2014). "Thegn". In Lapidge, Michael; Blair, John; Keynes, Simon; Scragg, Donald (eds.). The Wiley Blackwell Encyclopedia of Anglo-Saxon England (2nd ed.). Chichester, West Sussex: Wiley Blackwell. pp. 459–461. ISBN 978-0-470-65632-7.
- Lapidge, Michael; Winterbottom, Michael, eds. (1991). Wulfstan of Winchester: The Life of St Æthelwold. Oxford: Clarendon Press. ISBN 978-0-19-822266-8.
- Latham, R. E. (1981). Dictionary of Medieval Latin from British Sources: C. Vol. II. Oxford: Oxford University Press for the British Academy. ISBN 978-0-19-725968-9.
- Latham, R. E.; Howlett, David (1986). Dictionary of Medieval Latin from British Sources: D-E. Vol. III. Oxford: Oxford University Press for the British Academy. ISBN 978-0-19-726023-4.
- Miller, Sean, ed. (2001). Charters of the New Minster, Winchester. Anglo-Saxon Charters. Oxford: Oxford University Press for the British Academy. ISBN 978-0-19-726223-8.
- O'Donovan, M. A., ed. (1988). Charters of Sherborne. Anglo-Saxon Charters. Oxford: Oxford University Press for the British Academy. ISBN 978-0-19-726051-7.
- Robertson, Agnes, ed. (1956). Anglo-Saxon Charters (2nd ed.). Cambridge: Cambridge University Press. OCLC 504288415.
- "sewer, n.2". Oxford English Dictionary (Online ed.). Oxford: Oxford University Press. September 2021. (Subscription or participating institution membership required.)
- Stafford, Pauline (2014). "Ealdorman". In Lapidge, Michael; Blair, John; Keynes, Simon; Scragg, Donald (eds.). The Wiley Blackwell Encyclopedia of Anglo-Saxon England (2nd ed.). Chichester, West Sussex: Wiley Blackwell. pp. 156–157. ISBN 978-0-470-65632-7.
- Stevenson, William, ed. (1904). Asser's Life of King Alfred (in Latin). Oxford: Clarendon Press. OCLC 1354216.
- Williams, Ann (1982). "Princeps Merciorum Gentis: the Family, Career and Connections of Ælfhere, Ealdorman of Mercia". Anglo-Saxon England. 10. Cambridge: Cambridge University Press: 143–172. doi:10.1017/S0263675100003240. ISSN 0263-6751.
- Williams, Ann (2004). "Edmund I (920/21–946)". Oxford Dictionary of National Biography. Oxford: Oxford University Press. doi:10.1093/ref:odnb/8501. ISBN 978-0-19-861412-8. (subscription or UK public library membership required)
