= Ancient Greek personal names =

Branch of onomastics

The study of ancient Greek personal names is a branch of onomastics, the study of names, and more specifically of anthroponomastics, the study of names of persons. There are hundreds of thousands and even millions of individuals whose Greek name are on record; they are thus an important resource for any general study of naming, as well as for the study of ancient Greece itself. The names are found in literary texts, on coins and stamped amphora handles, on potsherds used in ostracisms, and, much more abundantly, in inscriptions and (in Egypt) on papyri. This article will concentrate on Greek naming from the 8th century BC, when the evidence begins, to the end of the 6th century AD.

== Single names and names within families ==
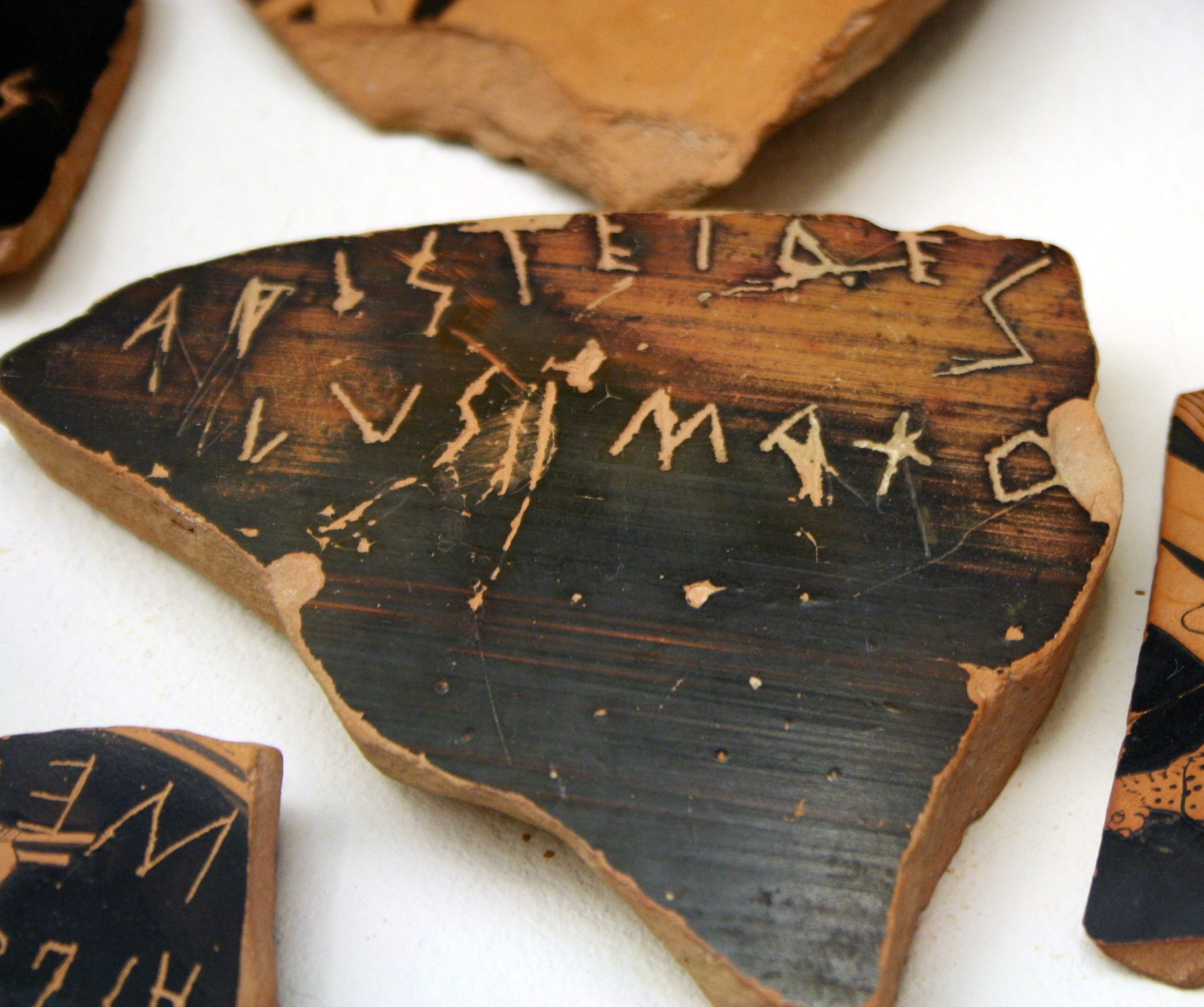
A 5th century BC ostrakon: a pot shard bearing the name of a politician proposed for ostracism (exile). The individual name Aristides and patronym Lysimachos together mean "Aristides, son of Lysimachos"

Ancient Greeks usually had one name, but another element was often added in semi-official contexts or to aid identification: a father's name (patronym) in the genitive case, or some regions as an adjectival formulation. A third element might be added, indicating the individual's membership in a particular kinship or other grouping, or city of origin (when the person in question was away from that city). Thus the orator Demosthenes, while proposing decrees in the Athenian assembly, was known as "Demosthenes, son of Demosthenes of Paiania"; Paiania was the deme or regional sub-unit of Attica to which he belonged by birth. In some rare occasions, if a person was illegitimate or fathered by a non-citizen, they might use their mother's name (metronym) instead of their father's. Ten days after birth, relatives on both sides were invited to a sacrifice and feast called dekátē (δεκάτη), "tenth day"; on this occasion the father formally named the child.

Demosthenes was unusual in bearing the same name as his father; it was more common for names to alternate between generations or between lines of a family. Thus it was common to name a first son after his paternal grandfather, and the second after the maternal grandfather, great-uncle, or great-aunt. A speaker in a Greek court case explained that he had named his four children after, respectively, his father, the father of his wife, a relative of his wife, and the father of his mother. Alternatively, family members might adopt variants of the same name, such as "Demippos, son of Demotimos". The practice of naming children after their grandparents is still widely practiced in Greece today.

This article uses names written in Romanized form. For example the Greek name Δημόκριτος is written in the form Demokritos (meaning "chosen of the people"). But this same name is normally written as Democritus in the Latin spelling which is the standard used in modern literature.

== Naming women ==
In many contexts, etiquette required that respectable women be spoken of as the wife or daughter of X rather than by their names. On gravestones or dedications, however, they had to be identified by name. Here, the patronymic formula "son of X" used for men might be replaced by "wife of X", or supplemented as "daughter of X, wife of Y".

Many women bore forms of standard masculine names, with a feminine ending substituted for the masculine. Many standard names related to specific masculine achievements had a common feminine equivalent; the counterpart of Kallimachos "noble battle" or "fair in battle" would be Kallimachē; likewise Stratonikos "army victory" would correspond to Stratonikē. The taste mentioned above for giving family members related names was one motive for the creation of such feminine forms. There were also feminine names with no masculine equivalent, such as Glykera "sweet one"; Hedistē "most delightful", Kalliopē, "beautiful-voiced".

Another distinctive way of forming feminine names was the neuter diminutive suffix -ion (-ιον, while the masculine corresponding suffix was -ιων), suggesting the idea of a "little thing": e.g., Aristion from aristos "best"; Mikrion from mikros "small". Perhaps by extension of this usage, women's names were sometimes formed from men's by a change to a neuter ending without the diminutive sense: Hilaron from hilaros, "cheerful".

== Formation ==
There were five main personal name types in Greece:

=== Compound names ===
Demosthenes is compounded from two ordinary Greek roots (a structure at least as old as Proto-Indo-European): demos "people" and sthenos "strength". A vast number of Greek names have this form, being compounded from two recognizable (though sometimes shortened) elements: Nikomachos from nike "victory" and mache "battle", Sophokles from sophos "wise, skilled" and kleos "glory", Polykrates from poly "much" and kratos "power". The elements used in these compounds are typically positive and of good omen, stressing such ideas as beauty, strength, bravery, victory, glory, and horsemanship. The order of the elements was often reversible: aristos and kleos give both Aristokles and Klearistos.

Such compounds have a more or less clear meaning. It was already noted by Aristotle, that two elements could be brought together in illogical ways. Thus the immensely productive hippos "horse" yielded, among hundreds of compounds, not only meaningful ones such as Philippos "lover of horses" and Hippodamas "horse-tamer", but also Xenippos "stranger horse" and Andrippos "man horse" and Hippias (likely just meaning "horse"). There were, in turn, numerous other names beginning with Xen- and Andr-. These "irrational" compounds arose through a combination of common elements. One motive was a tendency for members of the same family to receive names that echoed one another without being identical. Thus we meet Demippos, son of Demotimos, where the son's name is irrational ("people horse") and the father's name meaningful ("people honour", i.e., honored among the people).

A very common element found in Greek names was also the root Eu-, from eus meaning "well" or "good". This is found in names such as Eumenes "good mind", and Euphemos "good reputation". Similar looking prefixes include Eury- "wide", as in Eurydike "wide justice", and also Euthy- "straight" as in Euthymenes, "straight mind". Some of the most famous compound names were also created using the word Andros "man", such as Anaxandros "lord man", Lysandros "liberating man", Alexandros "defending man". The other forms include Androkles "man glory" (or "glorious man"), Andromachos "man battle" (or probably "man of battle") and Nikanor "victory man". Another recurring element is Lys-, from lysis "releasing", found in names such as Lysimachos "liberating battle", Lysanias "releasing from sorrow", and Lysias "release" or "liberation". The root Phil-, originating from the word philos "loving", was also used widely among Greeks, and found in names such as Philoxenos "lover of strangers" and Philetairos "lover of companions".

=== Shortened names ===
A second major category of names was shortened versions ("hypocoristics," or in German Kosenamen) of the compounded names. Thus alongside the many names beginning with Kall- "beauty" such as Kallinikos "of fair victory", there are shortened Kallias and Kallon (masculine) or Kallis (feminine). Alongside victory names such as Nikostratos "victory army", there are Nikias and Nikon (masculine) or Niko (feminine). Such shortenings were variously formed and very numerous: more than 250 shortenings of names in Phil(l)- ("love") and related roots have been counted.

=== Simple names ===
Ordinary nouns and adjectives of the most diverse types were used as names, either unadjusted or with the addition of a wide variety of suffixes. For instance, some twenty different names are formed from aischros "ugly", including that of the poet we know as Aeschylus, the Latin spelling of Aischylos. Among the many different categories of nouns and adjectives from which the most common names derive are colors (Xanthos "yellow"), animals (Moschos "heifer", and Dorkas "roe deer"), physical characteristics (Simos "snub nose"; Strabon "squinty-eyed"), parts of the body (Kephalos, from kephale "head", and many from various slang terms for genitalia). Few of these simple names are as common as the most common compound names, but they are extraordinarily numerous and varied. Identifying their origins often taxes the knowledge of the outer reaches of Greek vocabulary. Here the quest for dignity seen in the compound names largely disappears. Some, to our ears, sound positively disrespectful: Gastron "pot belly", Batrachos "frog", Kopreus "shitty", but these are probably by origin affectionate nicknames, in many cases applied to small children, and subsequently carried on within families.

=== Theophoric ("god-carrying") names ===
Many Greeks bore names derived from those of gods. However, it was not normal before the Roman period for Greeks to bear exactly the same names as gods, but they did use adjectival forms of Divine names. For example Dionysios "belonging to Dionysos" and Demetrios "belonging to Demeter" (feminine forms Dionysia and Demetria) were the most common such names in ancient times.

There were also compound theophoric names, formed with a wide variety of suffixes, of which the most common were -doros "gift of" (e.g. Athenodoros "gift of Athena") or -dotos "given by" (e.g. Apollodotos "given by Apollo"). Many names were also based on cult titles of gods: Pythodoros "gift of Pythios", i.e. Apollo. Other less common suffixes were -phon "voice of" (e.g. Dionysophon "voice of Dionysos") and -phanes "appearing" (e.g. Diophanes, "Zeus appearing" or "looking like Zeus"). Also common were names formed from the simple theos "god", such as Theodoros, or the feminine form Theodora. All the major gods except the god of war, Ares, and gods associated with the underworld (Persephone, Hades, Plouton [=Latin Pluto]) generated theophoric names, as did some lesser gods (rivers in particular) and heroes. When new gods rose to prominence (Asklepios) or entered Greece from outside (Isis, Sarapis), they too generated theophoric names formed in the normal ways (e.g. Asklepiodotos, Isidoros, Sarapias).

=== Lallnamen ===
This is the German word used for names that derived not from other words but from the sounds made by little children addressing their relatives. Typically, they involve repeated consonants or syllables (like English Dada, Nana)—examples are Nanna and Papas. They grew hugely in frequency from a low base in the Roman period, probably through the influence of other naming traditions such as Phrygian, in which such names were very common.

== Suffixes ==
Many Greeks names used distinctive suffixes that conveyed additional meaning. The suffix -ides (idas in Doric areas such as Sparta) indicates patrilineal descent, and usually means "descendant of", but in some cases can also mean "son of". For example Eurycratides means "descendant of Eurycrates", while Leonidas means "descendant of Leon", as in Leon of Sparta, but literally may also mean "son of a lion", since the name Leon means "lion" in Greek. Greeks often used this suffix when naming their sons after prominent ancestors like grandfathers and so on. The diminutive suffix -ion was also common, e.g. Hephaestion ("little Hephaestus").

== History ==
The main broad characteristics of Greek name formation listed above are found in other Indo-European languages (the Indo-Iranian, Germanic, Celtic, and Balto-Slavic subgroups); they look like an ancient inheritance within Greek. The naming practices of the Mycenaeans in the 14th/13th centuries BC, insofar as they can be reconstructed from the early Greek known as Linear B, seem already to display most of the characteristics of the system visible when literacy resumed in the 8th century BC, though non-Greek names were also present (and most of these pre-Greek names did not survive into the later epoch). This is true also of the epic poetry of Homer, where many heroes have compound names of familiar types (Alexandros, Alkinoos, Amphimachos). But the names of several of the greatest heroes (e.g. Achilleus, Odysseus, Agamemnon, Priamos) cannot be interpreted in those terms and were seldom borne by mortals again until a taste for "heroic" names developed under the Roman Empire; they have a different, unexplained origin. The system described above underwent few changes before the Roman period, though the rise of Macedonia to power earned names of that region such as Ptolemaios, Berenike, and Arsinoe new popularity. Alternative names ("X also known as Y") started to appear in documents in the 2nd century BC but had been occasionally mentioned in literary sources much earlier.

A different phenomenon, that of individuals bearing two names (e.g., Hermogenes Theodotos), emerged among families of high social standing—particularly in Asia Minor in the Roman imperial period, possibly under the influence of Roman naming patterns. The influence of Rome is certainly visible both in the adoption of Roman names by Greeks and in the drastic transformation of names by Greeks who acquired Roman citizenship, a status marked by possession of not one but three names. Such Greeks often took the praenomen and nomen of the authors or sponsors of their citizenship, but retained their Greek name as cognomen to give such forms as Titus Flavius Alkibiades. Various mixed forms also emerged. The Latin suffix –ianus, originally indicating the birth family of a Roman adopted into another family, was taken over to mean initially "son of" (e.g. Asklepiodotianos 'son of Asklepiodotos'), then later as a source of independent new names.

Another impulse came with the spread of Christianity, which brought new popularity to names from the New Testament, names of saints and martyrs, and existing Greek names such as Theodosios "gift of god", which could be reinterpreted in Christian terms. But non-Christian names, even theophoric names such as Dionysios or Sarapion, continued to be borne by Christians — a reminder that a theophoric name could become a name like any other, its original meaning forgotten. Another phenomenon of late antiquity (5th–6th centuries) was a gradual shift away from the use of the father's name in the genitive as an identifier. A tendency emerged instead to indicate a person's profession or status within the Christian church: carpenter, deacon, etc. Many Greek names have come down by various routes into modern English, some easily recognisable such as Helen or Alexander, some modified such as Denis (from Dionysios).

== Names as history ==
The French epigraphist Louis Robert declared that what is needed in the study of names is not "catalogues of names but the history of names and even history by means of names (l'histoire par les noms)." Names are a neglected but in some areas crucial historical source. Many names are characteristic of particular cities or regions. It is seldom safe to use an individual's name to assign him to a particular place, as the factors that determine individual choices of name vary. But where a good cluster of names are present, it will usually be possible to identify with much plausibility where the group in question derives from. By such means, the origins of, say, bands of mercenaries or groups of colonists named in inscriptions without indication of their homeland can often be determined. Names are particularly important in situations of cultural contact: they may answer the question whether a particular city is Greek or non-Greek, and document the shifts and complexities in ethnic self-identification even within individual families. They also, through theophoric names, provide crucial evidence for the diffusion of new cults, and later of Christianity.

Two other once-popular ways of exploiting names for social history, by contrast, have fallen out of favor. Certain names and classes of name were often borne by slaves, since their names were given or changed at will by their owners, who may not have liked to allow them dignified names. But no names or very few were so borne exclusively, and many slaves had names indistinguishable from those of the free; one can never identify a slave by name alone. Similar arguments apply to so-called "courtesans’ names".

== Study ==
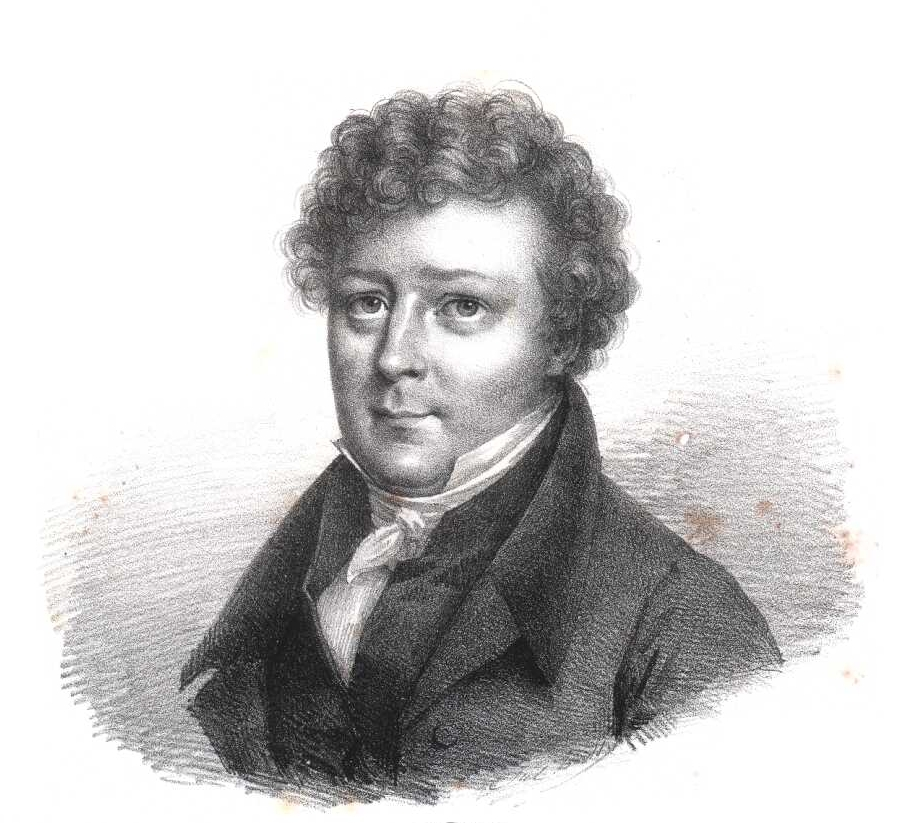
Jean Antoine Letronne

Jean Antoine Letronne (1851) was the pioneer work stressing the importance of the subject. Pape and Benseler (1863–1870) was for long the central work of reference but has now been replaced. Bechtel (1917) is still the main work that seeks to explain the formation and meaning of Greek names, although the studies of O. Masson et al. collected in Onomastica Graeca Selecta (1990–2000) have constantly to be consulted.

L. Robert, Noms indigènes dans l’Asie Mineure gréco-romaine (1963), is, despite its title, largely a successful attempt to show that many names attested in Asia Minor and supposed to be indigenous are in fact Greek; it is a dazzling demonstration of the resources of Greek naming.

The fundamental starting point is now the multi-volume A Lexicon of Greek Personal Names, founded by P.M. Fraser and still being extended with the collaboration of many scholars. This work lists, region by region, not only every name attested in the region but every bearer of that name (thus popularity of the name can be measured). The huge numbers of Greek names attested in Egypt are accessible at Trismegistos People. Several volumes of studies have been published that build on the new foundation created by these comprehensive collections: S. Hornblower and E. Matthews (2000); E. Matthews (2007); R. W. V. Catling and F. Marchand (2010); R. Parker (2013).
