= Abbreviations for classical authors and texts =

Abbreviations for classical authors and texts are abbreviations used to refer to ancient authors and their works that are used in academic publications in the field of classical studies (Latin and Ancient Greek language, literature, history, archaeology). Two systems are in common use, based on the abbreviations lists of standard reference works:

- The Oxford Classical Dictionary (OCD), which covers both Greek and Latin authors and texts.
- Either Liddell & Scott (LSJ) or the Diccionario Griego-Español (DGE) for Greek authors and texts, combined with either the Thesaurus Linguae Latinae (TLL) or the Oxford Latin Dictionary (OLD) for Latin authors and texts.

The two systems overlap substantially: Homer and Plato, for instance, are "Hom." and "Pl." in the OCD, LSJ, and the DGE; Cicero and Horace are "Cic." and "Hor." in the OCD, the TLL, and the OLD. Occasionally, however, abbreviations in LSJ and the DGE are shorter than in the OCD: for instance, Aeschylus and Euripides are "A." and "E." in LSJ, "Aesch." and "Eur." in the OCD. As a consequence, abbreviations in the OCD can be clearer than those in LSJ. However, the OCD has fewer abbreviations for authors and texts than LSJ and the OLD or TLL combined. As a result, publications dealing with minor authors and texts not included in the OCD often have to resort to the other, fuller system.

Both for Greek and for Latin texts, abbreviations are conventionally based on the Latin name of the author and title of the work. For instance, Aristophanes' Frogs is abbreviated "Ra." or "Ran." (from Ranae) and Horace's Odes are abbreviated "Carm." (from Carmina). This is due to the former status of Latin as the language of scholarly communication in the discipline as well as to the usefulness of having a set of references that is valid across present-day national and linguistic boundaries.

When a work is falsely attributed to an author by ancient sources, his or her abbreviated name is often put between square brackets: for instance, the Shield of Heracles falsely attributed to Hesiod is abbreviated as "[Hes.] Sc." (from Scutum). An alternative is "Pseudo-" (abbreviated "Ps.") attached to the purported author's name, such as the anonymous "Pseudo-Longinus" who authored the treatise On the Sublime.

Fragments and certain kinds of texts, such as lexica and scholia, are generally referenced with the surname(s) of the editor(s) of the edition used, so as to disambiguate it from other editions of the same text which may have different numbering systems. The surname(s) can be cited entire or abbreviated: for instance, "Snell-Maehler" or "Sn.-M." for the fragments of Pindar.

As well as authors' names and the titles of works, Classical publications often use abbreviations for other items that are relevant to Classical antiquity. These also tend to come in standardised form:

- For papyri and similar materials such as ostraca, the Checklist of Editions of Greek, Latin, Demotic and Coptic Papyri, Ostraka and Tablets.
- For Greek inscriptions, the abbreviations list of the Supplementum Epigraphicum Graecum (SEG) or of the Association Internationale d'Epigraphie Grecque et Latine.
- For journals, the abbreviations list of the Année Philologique.

Often a collection of fragments by different authors has its own acronym, such as "FGrHist" for Felix Jacoby's collection of the fragmentary Greek historians, Fragmente der griechischen Historiker. The same is true of some widely used reference works, such as "LSJ" for Liddell and Scott's Greek dictionary or "RE" (or sometimes "PW") for the Pauly-Wissowa's 82-volume encyclopedia of Classical scholarship, the Realencyclopädie der classischen Altertumswissenschaft. These acronyms are listed in the abbreviation list of the OCD.
