= List of Greek and Latin roots in English =

The English language uses many Greek and Latin roots, stems, and prefixes. These roots are listed alphabetically on three pages:

- Greek and Latin roots from A to G
- Greek and Latin roots from H to O
- Greek and Latin roots from P to Z.

Some of those used in medicine and medical technology are listed in the List of medical roots, suffixes and prefixes.

== See also ==
- Classical compound
- English words of Greek origin
- List of Greek morphemes used in English
- English prefixes
- Greek language
- Hybrid word
- Interlingua
- International scientific vocabulary
- Latin
- Latin influence in English
- Lexicon Mediae et Infimae Latinitatis Polonorum
- List of Greek phrases
- List of Latin abbreviations
- List of Latin and Greek words commonly used in systematic names
- List of Latin legal terms
- List of Latin phrases
- List of Latin words with English derivatives
- List of Latinised names
- Romanization (cultural)
- Help:IPA/Latin
