= Alpheios Project =

The Alpheios Project is an open source initiative originally focused on developing software to facilitate reading Latin and ancient Greek. Dictionaries, grammars and inflection tables were combined in a set of web-based tools to provide comprehensive reading support for scholars, students and independent readers. The tools were implemented as browser add-ons so that they could be used on any web site or any page that a user might create in Unicoded HTML.

In collaboration with the Perseus Digital Library, the goals of the Alpheios Project were subsequently broadened to combine reading support with language learning. Annotation and editing tools were added to help users contribute to the development of new resources, such as enhanced texts that have been syntactically annotated or aligned with translations.

The Alpheios tools are designed modularly to encourage the addition of other languages that have the necessary digital resources, such as morphological analyzers and dictionaries. In addition to Latin and ancient Greek, Alpheios tools have been extended to Arabic and Chinese.

The Alpheios Project is a non-profit (501c3) initiative. The software is open source, and resides on SourceForge.com. The Alpheios software is released as GPL 3.0 and texts and data as CC-by-SA.

== History ==
The Alpheios Project was established in 2007 by Mark Nelson, the founder of the commercial software company Ovid Technologies, which he started after writing a search engine for medical literature that became widely popular in medical libraries and research facilities (Strauch, 1996). Nelson, who holds an MA in English literature from Columbia University, sold the company to Wolters Kluwer in 1999 (Quint, 1998). Nelson created Alpheios by recruiting several developers and programmers from his previous company, defining the project's initial goals and funding its first three years of operation. In 2008 he also provided the initial funding for The Perseus Treebank of Ancient Greek, which has subsequently been crowd-sourced.

In 2011, the Perseus Project hired key Alpheios staff and the activities of the projects were extensively integrated, although Alpheios remains an independent organization focused on developing adaptive reading and learning tools that can provide formative assessment customized to the individual user's special abilities and goals, including the study of specific authors or texts.

To date, all Alpheios applications, enhanced texts and code have been provided without any fees or licenses. A separate Alpheios LLC provides commercial consultation on customization and extension of the Alpheios tools.

== Currently Available Alpheios Resources ==
=== Reading Support Tools (Available as Browser Plugins) ===
==== Latin ====
===== Dictionaries =====
William Whitaker's Words
A Latin Dictionary by Lewis and Short

===== Grammars =====
A New Latin Grammar by Charles Edwin Bennett

===== Morphological Analyzers =====
Whittaker's Words morphological analyzer
Morpheus from the Perseus Project

===== Inflection tables =====
Alpheios- derived from Allen and Greenough's New Latin Grammar

==== Greek ====
===== Dictionaries =====
Greek-English Lexicon by Liddell and Scott
Liddell and Scott's Intermediate Greek Lexicon
A Homeric dictionary by Georg Autenrieth
John Jeffrey Dodson's Lexicon of Biblical Greek (supplied by Jonathan Robie)
Abbott-Smith's Manual Greek Lexicon of the New Testament (supplied by Jonathan Robie)

===== Grammars =====
Greek Grammar by Herbert Weir Smyth

===== Morphological Analyzers =====
Morpheus from the Perseus Project

===== Inflection tables =====
Alpheios- derived from the Ancient Greek Tutorials by Donald Mastronarde and from Smyth

==== Arabic ====
===== Dictionaries =====
H.A. Salmone's Advanced Learner's Arabic-English Dictionary
E.W. Lane's Arabic English Lexicon

===== Morphological analyzer =====
Buckwalter

The reading tools also contain some pedagogical features typically found in e-tutors such as morphological and lexical quizzes and games and the automatic comparison of the user's own claims about vocabulary proficiency with his recorded use of the dictionary resources.

=== Enhanced Texts (originals derived chiefly from the Perseus Project) ===
==== Greek ====
===== syntactic diagrams (Treebank) =====
All of Homer, Hesiod and Aeschylus. Selections from Sophocles and Plato.

eg the Odyssey

===== alignment with a translation =====
Homer, first book of the Odyssey

==== Latin ====
===== syntactic diagrams =====
Selections from Ovid

===== alignment with a translation =====
Two poems by Propertius

==== Arabic ====
a number of the Arabic texts that Perseus has digitized are available directly from Alpheios, including:

Kitab al-Aghani: "The Book of Songs"

Kitāb alf laylah wa-laylah: "The Arabian Nights"

Selections from The Voyages of Ibn Batuta.

Selections from the Annals of Tabari

The Autobiography of the Constantinople Story-teller

=== Annotation Tools for Text Enhancement and Pedagogy ===
==== Treebank editor ====
Supports manual diagramming of sentences in any language that has spaces or punctuation between its words, annotating the nodes and arcs as desired, and exporting as a re-usable xml document.

==== Alignment editor ====
Supports manual word or phrase alignment of a text in any language with its translation into any other language, and export as a re-usable xml document.

The New Testament in Greek and Latin (courtesy of the PROIEL Treebank) is provided for practicing use of the alignment editor.

== Other Alpheios Projects ==
Prototype of a poetry reader with a line from the Iliad read by Stanley Lombardo.

Prototype of a text analysis tool to compare the frequency of lemmas in two different texts.

Prototype of a text analysis tool that returns the frequency of both lemmas and specific morphological forms, and the frequency with which a given morphological form represents a specific grammatical function, and vice versa.

Prototype of integration into the Moodle learning management system to generate a dynamic reading list.

== Research Collaborations ==
the Perseus Digital Library, Tufts University.

Fragmenta Historica 2.0: quotations and text re-use in the semantic web. Monica Berti. University of Rome, Tor Vergata:

Integration into a Collaborative Editing Platform for the Perseids Project: Marie-Claire Beaulieu. Tufts University, funded by the Andrew Mellon Foundation.

Prototype of wordnets for Latin and ancient Greek developed with the Perseus Project and Federico Boschetti and Monica Monachini of the Istituto di Linguistica Computazionale "Antonio Zampolli" in Pisa.

Prototype of a system for automatic alignment of Greek and Arabic as part of A Digital Corpus for Greco-Arabic Studies (A joint project of the Classics Departments of Harvard and Tufts Universities funded by the Andrew Mellon Foundation).

Developing a research platform for comparing Computer Assisted Language Learning methods and collecting "big data" on second language learning with Brian MacWhinney and John Kowalski, Department of Psychology, Carnegie Mellon University.

== Chief Pedagogical Collaborators ==
University of Leipzig: Humboldt Chair of Digital Humanities: Open Philology: E-Learning Project.

Robert J. Gorman. Department of Classics and Religious Studies. University of Nebraska-Lincoln

Anise Ferreira. Departamento de Linguística da Faculdade de Ciências e Letras. University of São Paulo: "Júlio de Mesquita Filho". Campus de Araraquara.(FCL-Ar/UNESP).

Neven Jovanović. Department of Classical Philology, University of Zagreb.

Alpheios encourages participation by interested individuals whether or not they have current academic affiliations.
