= Cloatius Verus =

1st century AD Roman Grammarian

- CLOATIUS VERUS
- Known for: grammarian

Cloatius Verus (d. 62 or 63) was a Roman grammarian who lived in the 1st century.

== Biography ==
He was born and lived in first century Rome.

== Career ==
He is chiefly notable for being a grammarian and for having written several treatises on the meanings of Greek words and on Latin words derived from Greek language.

== Sources ==
Some of the works of Cloatius Verus have been preserved by Macrobius.

In the Oxford Classical Dictionary, he is described thus: "Augustan lexicographer and antiquarian who wrote on the meanings of Greek words and on Latin words derived from Greek. He is probably the ‘Cloatius’ whom *Verrius Flaccus cites (with L. *Aelius) on Latin sacral terms."
