= CGL =

CGL may refer to:

- Cambridge Greek Lexicon
- Catalyst Game Labs
- Core OpenGL: Apple Computer's Macintosh Quartz windowing system interface to the Mac OS X implementation of the OpenGL specification
- Conway's Game of Life
- Chengalpattu Junction railway station (station code), in Tamil Nadu, India
- Chronic granulocytic leukemia, also known as Chronic myelogenous leukemia
- Coastal GasLink
- Confederazione Generale del Lavoro
- Commercial General Liability, a common type of liability insurance
- CGL (charity)
