= DGE =

DGE or Dge may refer to:

- Dual Gateway Exchange, a Crypto exchange allowing for both traditional trading and futures on one platform
- Delhi–Gurgaon Expressway, an expressway in India
- Diccionario Griego-Español
- Dingee railway station, Australia
- National Institute of Statistics and Geography (Dirección General de Estadística), the General Directorate of Statistics, a Mexican government agency founded in 1882 and merged into its successor agency INEGI in 1983
- Directeur général des élections du Québec
- Dynamic stochastic general equilibrium, a branch of applied general equilibrium theory in contemporary macroeconomics
- Denaturing gel electrophoresis, a DNA banding pattern-based typing method
- Diglycidyl ether, an industrial chemical
- Mudgee Airport, IATA airport code "DGE"
