= Musaeus Grammaticus =

Greek poet

Musaeus Grammaticus (Ancient Greek: Μουσαῖος, Mousaios) probably belongs to the beginning of the 6th century AD, as his poetic style and metre are evidently modeled on those of Nonnus. He lived before Agathias (530–582) and has been identified with a correspondent of Procopius of Gaza. His poem (340 hexameter lines) on the story of Hero and Leander is considered the most beautiful of the age (editions by Franz Passow, 1810; Gottfried Heinrich Schäfer, 1825; Karl Dilthey, 1874; Hans Färber, Hero und Leander: Musaios und die weiteren antiken Zeugnisse, Greek and Latin texts with German translation, Munich: Heimeran, 1961). The little love-poem Alpheus and Arethusa (Palatine Anthology ix. 362) is also ascribed to Musaeus.
