= Franz Passow =

German classical scholar and lexicographer (1786–1833)

Franz Ludwig Carl Friedrich Passow (20 September 1786 – 11 March 1833) was a German classical scholar and lexicographer.

== Biography ==
He was born at Ludwigslust in the Duchy of Mecklenburg-Schwerin. In 1807 he was appointed to the professorship of Greek literature at the Weimar gymnasium by Johann Wolfgang von Goethe, whose acquaintance he had made during a holiday tour; his lessons were attended by the young Arthur Schopenhauer. In 1815 he became professor of ancient literature at the University of Breslau, where he continued to live until his death. His endorsement of gymnastic exercises, in which he himself took part, caused a quarrel known as the Breslauer Turnfehde (“Breslau gymnastics feud”).

== Works ==
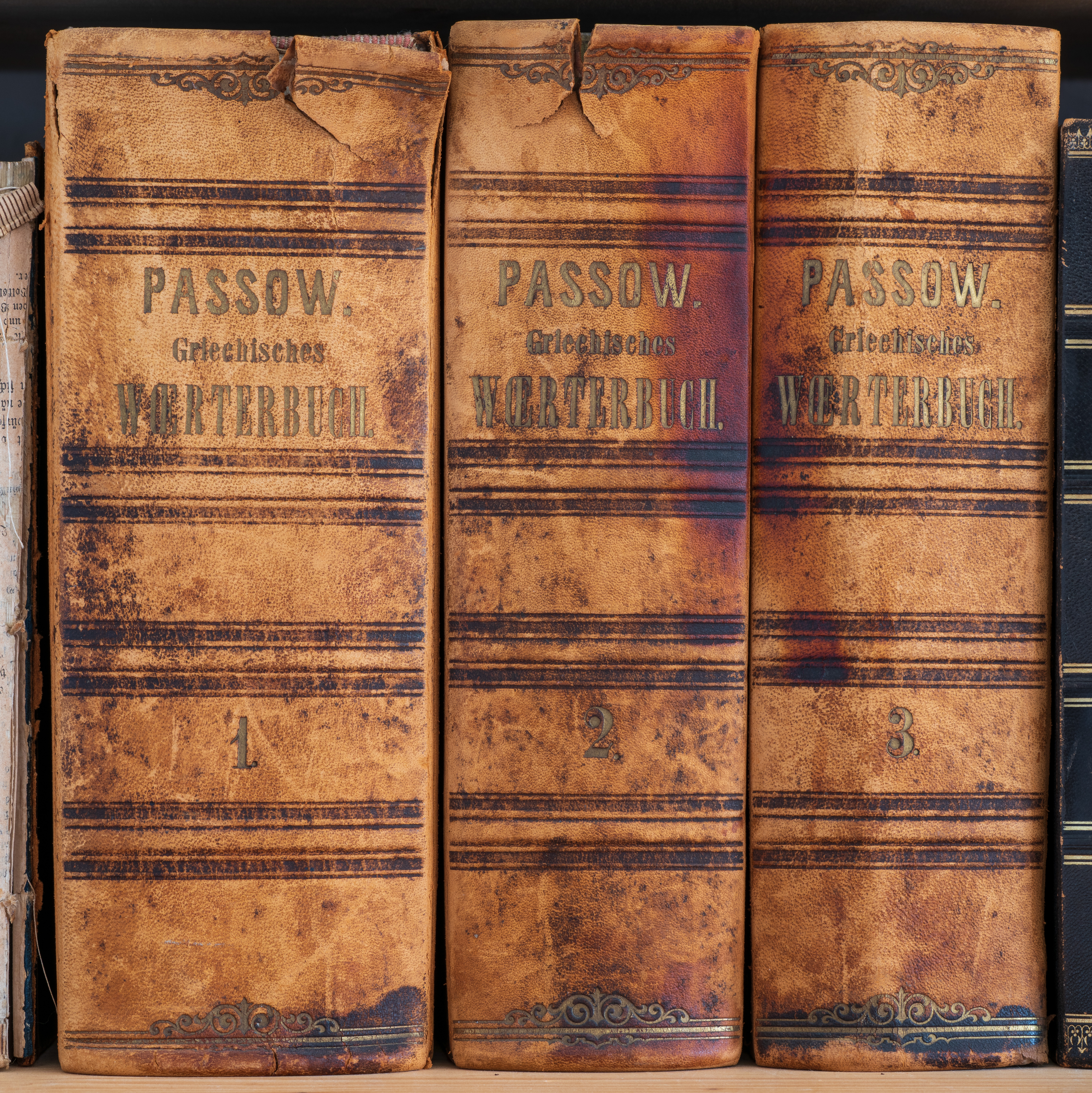
A copy of Passow’s Handwörterbuch der griechischen Sprache (revised edition, 1841–1857)

Passow's great work was his Handwörterbuch der griechischen Sprache (1819–1824) ("Dictionary of the Greek Language"), originally a revision of Johann Gottlob Schneider's lexicon, which appeared in the fourth edition (1831) as an independent work, without Schneider's name. Other works by Passow are Grundzüge der griech. und röm. Literatur und Kunstgeschichte (“Foundations of Greek and Roman Literature and History of Art”; 2nd ed., 1829) and editions of Persius, Longus, Tacitus's Germania, Dionysius Periegetes, and Musaeus. His miscellaneous writings were collected in Opuscula academica (“Minor academic works”; 1835) and Vermischte Schriften (“Miscellaneous writings”; 1843).

Passow's Greek lexicon was the basis for the Greek-English Lexicon of Liddell and Scott.

== See also ==
- Comparison of Ancient Greek dictionaries
