= Marcion (software) =

Marcion is Coptic–English/Czech dictionary related to Crum's Coptic dictionary, written in C++, based on MySQL, with Qt GUI. It contains many Coptic texts, grammars, Greek texts, Liddell–Scott Greek–English lexicon, and others, can be used as a Bible study tool. Marcion is free software released under the GNU GPL.
