= Johann Gottlob Theaenus Schneider =

German classicist and naturalist (1750–1822)

Johann Gottlob Schneider
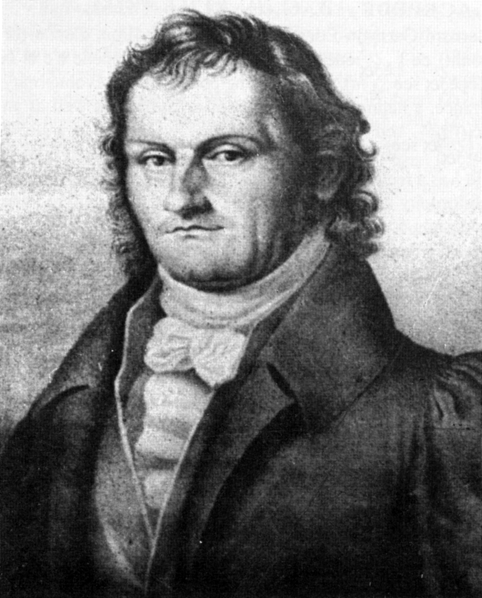
- Johann Gottlob Schneider
- Born: 18 January 1750; Collm, Electorate of Saxony, Holy Roman Empire
- Died: 12 January 1822 (aged 71); Breslau, Silesia Province
- Scientific career
- Fields: Natural history

Johann Gottlob Theaenus Schneider (18 January 1750 – 12 January 1822) was a German classicist and naturalist.

== Biography ==
Schneider was born at Collm in Saxony. In 1774, on the recommendation of Christian Gottlob Heine, he became secretary to the famous Strasbourg scholar Richard François Brunck, and in 1811, became professor of ancient languages and eloquence at Breslau (chief librarian, 1816) where he died in 1822.

== Works ==
Of his numerous works the most important was his Kritisches griechisch-deutsches Handwörterbuch (1797–1798), the first independent work of the kind since Stephanus's Thesaurus, and the basis of F. Passow's and all succeeding Greek lexicons (including, therefore, the contemporary standard A Greek-English Lexicon). A special improvement was the introduction of words and expressions connected with natural history and science.

In 1801, he corrected and expanded re-published Marcus Elieser Bloch's Systema Ichthyologiae iconibus cx illustratum, a famous catalog of fishes with beautiful illustrations that is cited (as Bloch and Schneider, 1801) as the taxonomy authority for many species of fish.

The scientific writings of ancient authors especially attracted him. He published editions of Aelian, De natura animalium; Nicander, Alexipharmaca and Theriaca; the Scriptores rei rusticae; Aristotle, Historia animalium and Politica; Epicurus, Physica and Meteorologica; Theophrastus's Historia plantarum, Eclogae physicae; Oppian, Halieutica and Cynegetica; the complete works of Xenophon and Vitruvius; the Argonautica of the so-called Orpheus (for which Ruhnken nicknamed him "Orpheomastix"); an essay on the life and writings of Pindar and a collection of his fragments. His Eclogae physicae is a selection of extracts of various length from Greek and Latin writers on scientific subjects, containing the original text and commentary, with essays on natural history and science in ancient times.

== Legacy ==
Schneider is commemorated in the scientific name of a species of lizard, Eumeces schneiderii.

== Works ==
- Handwörterbuch der griechischen Sprache. Vogel, Leipzig 1828.
- Griechisch-deutsches Wörterbuch. Hahn, Leipzig 1819.
- Kritisches griechisch-deutsches Wörterbuch. Frommann, Jena, Leipzig 1805/06.
- Eclogae physicae, ex scriptoribus praecipue Graecis excerptae. Frommann, Jena, Leipzig 1800.
- Historiae amphibiorum naturalis et literariae. Frommann, Jena 1799–1801.
- Kritisches griechisch-deutsches Handwörterbuch. Frommann, Jena, Züllichau 1797.
- Amphibiorum physiologiae specimen. Apitz, Frankfurt (Oder) 1790–97.
- Ad reliqua librorum Friderici II. et Alberti Magni capita commentarii ... Müller, Leipzig 1789.
- Zweyter Beytrag zur Naturgeschichte der Schildkröten. Müller, Leipzig 1789.
- Erster Beytrag zur Naturgeschichte der Schildkröten. Müller, Leipzig 1787.
- Sammlung vermischter Abhandlungen zur Aufklärung der Zoologie und der Handlungsgeschichte. Unger, Berlin 1784.
- Allgemeine Naturgeschichte der Schildkröten. Müller, Leipzig 1783.
- Ichthyologiae veterum specimina. Winter, Frankfurt (Oder) 1780.
- Synonymia piscium Graeca et Latina emendata, aucta atque illustrata 1789
- Anmerkungen über den Anakreon. Crusius, Leipzig 1770.

== See also ==
- Comparison of Ancient Greek dictionaries

== Sources ==
- This work in turn cites:
  - F. Passow, Opuscula academica (1835);
  - C. Bursian, Geschichte der classischen Philologie in Deutschland (1883).
