= Lucy Grig =

Professor of classics

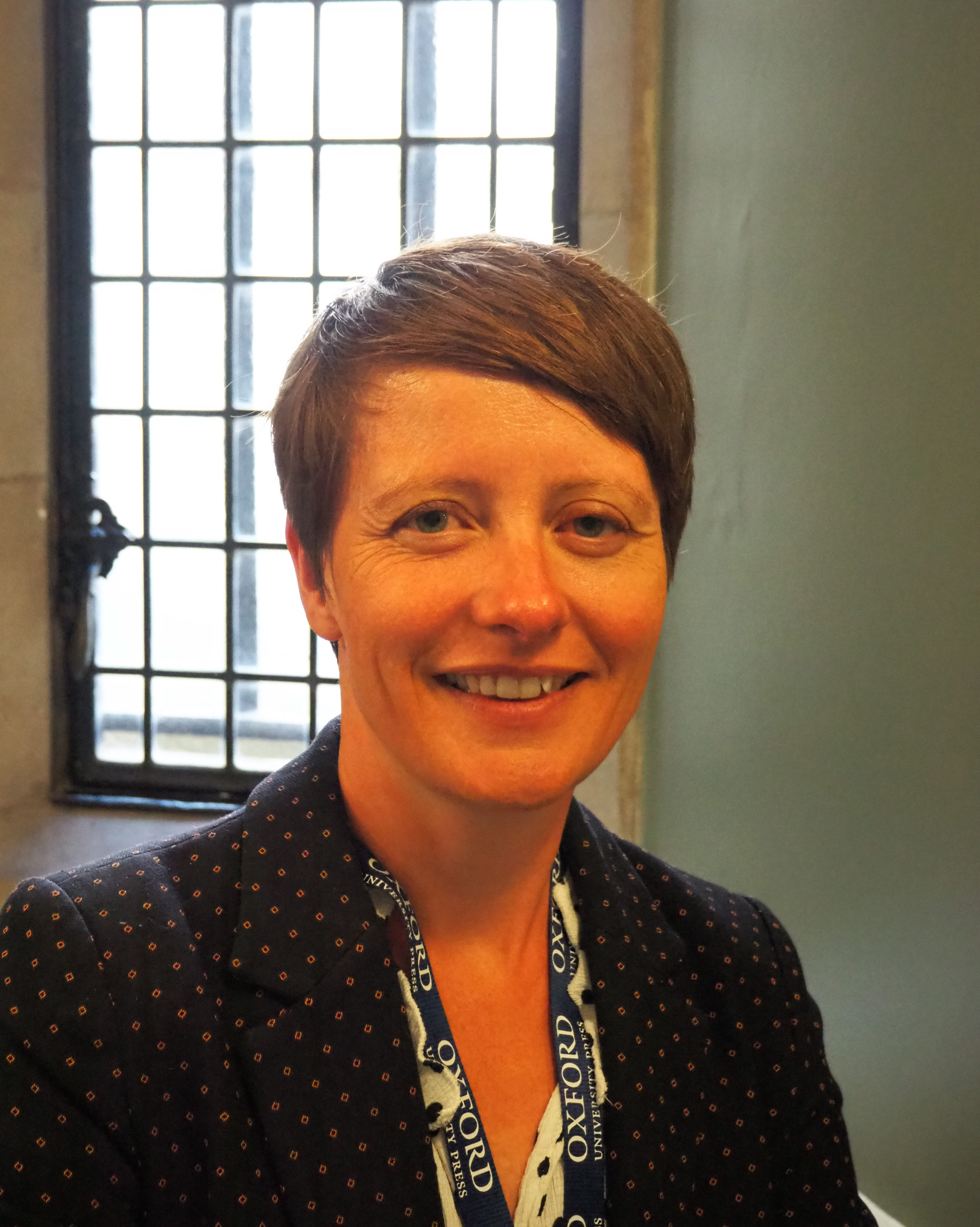
- Grig in 2019
- Born: 1973 (age 52–53)

Academic background
- Education: Queens' College, Cambridge; University of York; Faculty of Classics, University of Cambridge
- Thesis: Late antique martyrs: narration and representation (2000)

Academic work
- Discipline: Historian
- Sub-discipline: Late Antiquity; ancient history; culture of ancient Rome
- Institutions: University of Reading; British School at Rome; University of Edinburgh

Lucy Hannah Charlotte Grig (born 1973) is a British Historian and academic. She is Professor of the History of late antiquity and a former Head of Classics (2019–2022) at the University of Edinburgh. Since 2025, she has also been editor-in-chief of the Oxford Classical Dictionary.

== Early life and education ==
Grig was born in 1973. She studied history at Queens' College, Cambridge, graduating with a Bachelor of Arts (BA) degree, and then undertook a Master of Arts (MA) degree in Medieval studies at the University of York. She returned to the University of Cambridge where she completed a Doctor of Philosophy (PhD) degree in its Faculty of Classics in 2000. Her doctoral thesis was titled "Late antique martyrs: narration and representation".

== Academic career ==
Grig was a lecturer at the University of Reading from 2000 to 2004, with a break during 2001 to 2002 to be a Rome Scholar at the British School at Rome. In 2004m she moved to the University of Edinburgh as a lecturer. She was promoted to senior lecturer in 2014. She was awarded a prestigious British Academy Mid-Career Fellowship for the academic year 2016–17, in order to pursue the project 'Popular Culture and the End of Antiquity in Southern Gaul, c. 400-550'. She was appointed Professor of the History of Late Antiquity in 2024.

She is a member of the Governing Board of the International Late Antiquity Network, and was previously a member of the committee for the Society for the Promotion of Roman Studies. Grig was an editor for late antiquity for the Oxford Classical Dictionary, before becoming editor-in-chief in 2025.

In October 2017 she was part of the expert panel for Radio 4's In Our Time episode on Constantine and in November 2014 for the episode on Aesop. Grig contributed to the BBC radio show 'You're Dead to Me', hosted by Greg Jenner. She was the expert featured on Constantine the Great, and appeared alongside comedian Ivo Graham.

== Publications ==
=== Books ===
- Grig, Lucy (2004), Making martyrs in late antiquity, Duckworth, ISBN 9780715632857
- Grig, Lucy (2024), Popular Culture and the End of Antiquity in Southern Gaul, c. 400-550, Cambridge, United Kingdom, ISBN 9781108868792

=== Edited volumes ===
- Grig, Lucy; Kelly, Gavin (2012), Two Romes : Rome and Constantinople in Late Antiquity, Oxford studies in late antiquity, Oxford University Press, ISBN 978-0190241087
- Grig, Lucy (2017), Popular culture in the ancient world, Cambridge, United Kingdom, ISBN 978-1107074897

=== Articles and chapters ===
- 'Caesarius of Arles and the campaign against popular culture in late antiquity', Early Medieval Europe, 26 (1) 2018, pp. 61–81
- 'Life and death in late antiquity: Religious rituals and popular culture'. In: Lössl, J. and J. Nicholas, B. (eds.) A Companion to Religion in Late Antiquity. Malden, MA: Wiley-Blackwell, 2018, pp. 455–473
- 'Cities in the ‘long’ Late Antiquity, 2000–2012 – a survey essay', Urban History, 40 (3) 2013, pp. 554 – 566
- 'Deconstructing the symbolic city: Jerome as guide to late antique Rome', Papers of the British School at Rome, 80 (2012) pp. 125–143
- 'Throwing parties for the poor: poverty and splendour in the late antique church'. In: Margaret Atkins, R. (ed.) Poverty in the Roman World. Cambridge University Press, 2006, pp. 145–161
- 'Portraits, Pontiffs and the Christianization of Fourth-Century Rome', Papers of the British School at Rome, 72 (2004), pp. 203–230
- 'Torture and Truth in late antique Martyrology', Early Medieval Europe, 11 (2002), pp. 321–336
