= Marian Plezia =

Polish historian (1917–1996)

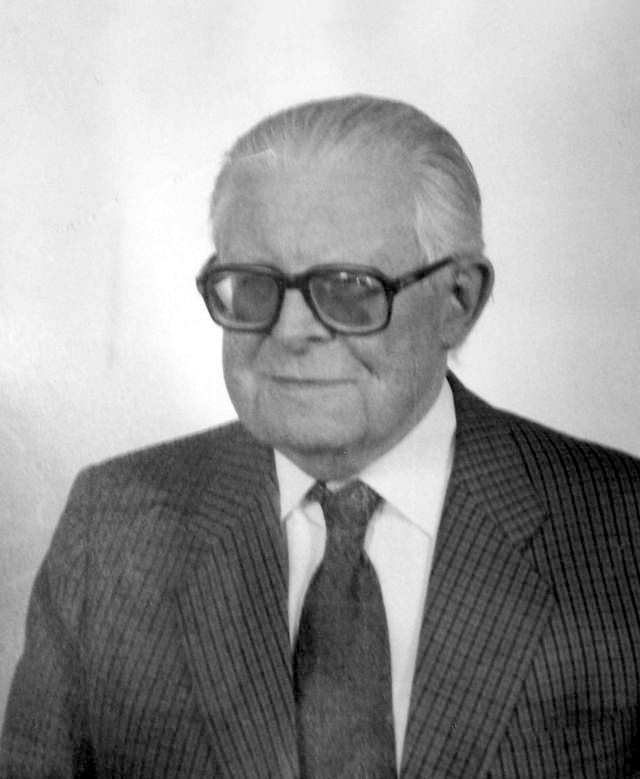
Marian Plezia

Marian Plezia (born 1917 in Kraków, d. 1996) was a Polish historian and classical philologist.

He was an expert in medieval Polish history and the ancient reception of Aristotle and his works. He also wrote on the history of classical scholarship and authored a Latin-Polish dictionary and a Medieval Latin-Polish dictionary.
