= Cambridge Greek Lexicon =

Dictionary of Ancient Greek

- Editor: James Diggle (editor-in-chief)
- Publisher: Cambridge University Press
- Publication date: 22 April 2021
- Pages: 1,529
- ISBN: 978-0-521-82680-8

The Cambridge Greek Lexicon is a dictionary of the Ancient Greek language published by Cambridge University Press in April 2021. First conceived in 1997 by the classicist John Chadwick, the lexicon was compiled by a team of researchers based in the Faculty of Classics in Cambridge consisting of the Hellenist James Diggle (Editor-in-Chief), Bruce Fraser, Patrick James, Oliver Simkin, Anne Thompson, and Simon Westripp. Abandoning the predominant historico-linguistic method, it begins each entry with the word's root meaning and proceeds to list further common usages. The dictionary is also notable for avoiding euphemism.

== Development ==
During the 20th century, the leading dictionary of Ancient Greek in the English-speaking world was A Greek–English Lexicon, commonly known as LSJ after the initials of its authors (Henry Liddell, Robert Scott, and Henry Stuart Jones). Published in 1843 by Oxford University Press, the LSJ was a dictionary of broad scope and aimed to provide a historico-linguistic account of the Greek language. Its entries contained many untranslated Greek quotations to illustrate individual usages of words while English approximations were used sparingly.

In 1997, the classical scholar John Chadwick conceived of a plan to update the LSJ, which had become antiquated but was still widely used. Although he had originally planned to improve the existing dictionary, Chadwick and the project's advisory committee soon realised the LSJ was too antiquated in its design and that they would have to start afresh. A team led by the Cambridge Hellenist James Diggle began a comprehensive reading of most Greek literature from the Homeric epics until the second century AD. The project was intended to take up to five years but took 23 years to conclude. The resulting dictionary was published as the Cambridge Greek Lexicon on 22 April 2021 by Cambridge University Press.

== Methodology and scope ==
The Cambridge Greek Lexicon begins each entry with the word's root meaning, differentiating itself from the preference for the earliest occurrence of a word found in LSJ. It then proceeds to list further common usages. The dictionary does not exhibit its predecessor's tendency to euphemism: whereas the LSJ translated the verb (χέζω) as 'ease oneself', the Cambridge Greek Lexicon gives 'to defecate' as the primary meaning. The first edition of the dictionary published in April 2021 comprised two volumes, featuring 37,000 Greek words on around 1,500 pages. It draws on the works of 90 authors.

== Reception ==
Writing for the educational charity Classics for All, reviewer Colin Leach wrote that the Cambridge Greek Lexicon was unlikely to replace the LSJ and added that the dictionary was nonetheless "an essential purchase for all institutions of learning where ancient Greek is taught". In a review for The Spectator, the classicist Peter Jones described the lexicon as "a triumphant intellectual and educational achievement", praising its "clarity and precision".

== See also ==
- Comparison of Ancient Greek dictionaries
