= Wilhelm Pape =

German classical philologist and lexicographer

Johann Georg Wilhelm Pape (3 January 1807 – 23 February 1854) was a German classical philologist and lexicographer. He is known today primarily as the author of his Griechisch-Deutsches Handwörterbuch [Concise Greek-German Dictionary], first published in 1842 and frequently reprinted in the 19th and early 20th centuries.

== Life ==
Pape was born in Berlin and educated in Culm, where his father was stationed as an officer. He studied theology and classical philology at the Humboldt University of Berlin. Under the influence of scholars such as August Boeckh and Karl Lachmann, he turned primarily to the study of philology. After graduating in 1828, he became a teaching assistant at the Gymnasium zum Grauen Kloster in Berlin, one of the oldest high schools in Germany. He gained his doctorate in Halle with a dissertation entitled Lectiones Varronianae, and was appointed a teacher at the Gymnasium in 1830. He spent the rest of his career there until his death in 1854 from a spinal disease.

== Scholarship ==
Concurrently with his duties at the school, Pape devoted himself to lexicographic studies. He completed an etymological dictionary of Greek in 1836, and in 1842 published the work for which is how he is known today, his Griechisch-Deutsches Handwörterbuch [Concise Greek-German Dictionary]. For the second edition (1849–1850), he added a dictionary of Greek proper names. A revised and expanded version of this latter work, published in two volumes by Gustav Eduard Benseler as Wörterbuch der griechischen Eigennamen (1863–70), became an important 19th-century reference work.

A revised third edition of Pape's Greek-German dictionary was published in 1880 and reprinted several times in the early 20th century. It was regarded as a serious competitor to the Handwörterbuch der griechischen Sprache of Franz Passow, which became the basis for Liddell and Scott's A Greek–English Lexicon.
