= Dictionary of Medieval Latin from British Sources =

Lexicon of Medieval Latin

- 2018 edition
- Editors: Richard Ashdowne; David Robert Howlett; Ronald Edward Latham
- Language: English
- Publisher: Oxford University Press for the British Academy
- Publication date: 2018 (1st ed. 1975 to 2013)
- Publication place: United Kingdom
- Media type: Print and online
- ISBN: 978-0-19-726633-5
- Dewey Decimal: 473/.21
- LC Class: PA2891

The Dictionary of Medieval Latin from British Sources ("DMLBS") is a lexicon of Medieval Latin published by the British Academy. The dictionary is not founded upon any earlier dictionary, but derives from original research. After decades of preparatory work, work on the dictionary itself was begun in 1965, and it was published in fascicules between 1975 and 2013. In 2016 the complete work was put online. A consolidated reprint in three volumes was published in 2018.

== History ==
In 1913, Robert Whitwell, a prolific contributor to the Oxford English Dictionary, petitioned the British Academy to use the imminent International Congress of Historical Studies to propose a replacement for the standard dictionary of medieval Latin, Du Cange's Glossarium (1678). Whitwell's idea was taken up in 1920 by the new International Union of Academies, which decided in 1924 that member academies should produce dictionaries based on those medieval Latin texts produced in geographic areas corresponding to their respective present-day territories, whilst also furnishing the material for an international Novum Glossarium. To this end, the British Academy appointed two committees to direct the collection of quotations, one covering the sixth to eleventh centuries for the Novum Glossarium and the other covering 1066 to 1600 for a dictionary of "late medieval British Latin".

By 1932 the academy felt that they could usefully publish the first fruits of the project, which appeared in 1934 as the Medieval Latin Word-List from British and Irish Sources, prepared by J. H. Baxter and Charles Johnson. A Revised Word-List prepared by Ronald Latham appeared in 1965.

== Print publication history ==
The DMLBS was published in printed fascicules, from 1975 to 2013, by Oxford University Press:

- I: A–B (R. E. Latham), 17 April 1975, ISBN 978-0-19-725948-1
- II: C (R. E. Latham), 14 May 1981, ISBN 978-0-19-725968-9
- III: D–E (R. E. Latham, D. R. Howlett, et al.), 26 June 1986, ISBN 978-0-19-726023-4
- IV: F–G–H (D. R. Howlett, A. H. Powell, et al.), 14 December 1989, ISBN 978-0-19-726082-1
- V: I–J–K–L (D. R. Howlett), 21 August 1997, ISBN 978-0-19-726148-4
- VI: M (D. R. Howlett, J. Blundell, et al.), 3 January 2002, ISBN 978-0-19-726240-5
- VII: N (D. R. Howlett), 30 May 2002, ISBN 978-0-19-726266-5
- VIII: O (D. R. Howlett), 29 January 2004, ISBN 978-0-19-726300-6
- IX: P–Pel (D. R. Howlett), 24 November 2005, ISBN 978-0-19-726340-2
- X: Pel–Phi (D. R. Howlett), 18 January 2007, ISBN 978-0-19-726387-7
- XI: Phi–Pos (D. R. Howlett), 13 December 2007, ISBN 978-0-19-726421-8
- XII: Pos–Pro (D. R. Howlett), 26 March 2009, ISBN 978-0-19-726436-2
- XIII: Pro–Reg (D. R. Howlett), 28 October 2010, ISBN 978-0-19-726467-6
- XIV: Reg–Sal (D. R. Howlett), 8 December 2011, ISBN 978-0-19-726508-6
- XV: Sal–Sol (D. R. Howlett, R. K. Ashdowne), 26 July 2012, ISBN 978-0-19-726528-4
- XVI: Sol–Syr (R. K. Ashdowne, D. R. Howlett), 19 February 2013, ISBN 978-0-19-726545-1
- XVII: Syr–Z (R. K. Ashdowne), 19 December 2013, ISBN 978-0-19-726561-1

A binding case for the first five fascicules was supplied with Fascicule V, forming a first volume (A–L). However, no further binding cases were issued.

In 2018 a three-volume consolidated edition was published incorporating additions and corrections, including those previously published, into the text.

== Publication online ==
In 2016 the whole DMLBS was published online, under licence from the British Academy. The Logeion version is free and is searchable by headword only. The Brepols version, available by subscription, is more fully searchable.

== See also ==
- A Latin Dictionary
- Oxford Latin Dictionary
- Lexicon Mediae et Infimae Latinitatis Polonorum
