= Oxford Classical Dictionary =

Encyclopedia of history

The Oxford Classical Dictionary (OCD) is an encyclopædic work in English consisting of articles relating to classical antiquity and its civilisations. It has been considered "the best one-volume dictionary on antiquity,"

The Oxford Classical Dictionary was first published in 1949 (OCD^{1} or OCD), edited by Max Cary with the assistance of H. J. Rose, H. P. Harvey, and Alexander Souter. A second edition followed in 1970 (OCD^{2}), edited by Nicholas G. L. Hammond and H. H. Scullard, and a third edition in 1996 (OCD^{3}), edited by Simon Hornblower and Antony Spawforth. A revised third edition was released in 2003, which is nearly identical to the previous third edition. A fourth edition was published in 2012 (OCD^{4}), edited by Simon Hornblower, Antony Spawforth, and Esther Eidinow. In 2016, a fully digital edition was launched online. Continuously updated on a monthly basis, this edition incorporates all 6,300 entries from OCD^{4} (which are being updated on a rolling basis) as well as newly commissioned entries, and features multimedia content and freely accessible maps of the ancient world. The digital version has been edited by Sander Goldberg (2013–2017), Tim Whitmarsh (2018–2024), and Lucy Grig (2025–present).

The OCD's over 6,400 articles cover everything from the daily life of the ancient Greeks and Romans to their geography, religion, and their historical figures.

== Digital and on-line availability ==
The fourth edition and the third revised edition of the OCD are available online for members of subscribed institutions and for subscribed individuals via Oxford Reference. The third edition (1996) was also available on CD-ROM, but it is partially incompatible with more recent versions of Windows and has not been revised or re-released.

The new digital edition is accessible online to institutional and individual subscribers via the Oxford Research Encyclopedias. Entry extracts/summaries and select full-length entries are freely available to non-subscribing individuals.

== Oxford Companion to Classical Civilization ==
The Oxford Companion to Classical Civilization (OCCC), part of the Oxford Companions series of Oxford University Press, is an independent publication consisting of a selection of articles from the OCD, with accompanying illustrations. The first edition was published in 1998 (OCCC^{1} or OCCC), edited by Simon Hornblower and Antony Spawforth, and contains over 600 articles selected from the OCD^{3}. A paperback edition was issued in 2004. The current second edition was published in 2014 (OCCC^{2}), edited by Simon Hornblower, Antony Spawforth, and Esther Eidinow, and contains over 700 articles selected from the OCD^{4}.

== Varia ==
National Latin Exam

A copy of the OCD has traditionally been offered by the National Latin Exam as a prize for students who obtain four consecutive ascending gold medals on the exam.

== Editions and versions ==
=== Oxford Classical Dictionary ===
- Oxford Classical Dictionary. Edited by Max Cary, with the assistance of H. J. Rose, H. P. Harvey, and A. Souter. Oxford: Clarendon Press, 1949.
- Oxford Classical Dictionary. Edited by Nicholas G. L. Hammond and H. H. Scullard. 2nd ed. Oxford: Clarendon Press, 1970.
- Oxford Classical Dictionary. Edited by Simon Hornblower and Antony Spawforth. 3rd ed. Oxford and New York: Oxford University Press, 1996. ISBN 978-0-19-866172-6.
- Oxford Classical Dictionary. Edited by Simon Hornblower and Antony Spawforth. 3rd rev. ed. Oxford and New York: Oxford University Press, 2003. ISBN 978-0-19-860641-3.
- Oxford Classical Dictionary. Edited by Simon Hornblower, Antony Spawforth, and Esther Eidinow. 4th ed. Oxford and New York: Oxford University Press, 2012. ISBN 978-0-19-954556-8.
- Oxford Classical Dictionary. Edited by Tim Whitmarsh. Digital ed. New York: Oxford University Press. ISBN 978-0-19-938113-5.

=== Oxford Companion to Classical Civilization ===
- Oxford Companion to Classical Civilization. Edited by Simon Hornblower and Antony Spawforth. Oxford and New York: Oxford University Press, 1998, 2004. ISBN 978-0-19-860165-4 (hb), ISBN 978-0-19-860958-2 (pb).
- Oxford Companion to Classical Civilization. Edited by Simon Hornblower, Antony Spawforth, and Esther Eidinow. 2nd ed. Oxford and New York: Oxford University Press, 2014. ISBN 978-0-19-870677-9.

== See also ==
- Abbreviations for Classical authors and texts
- Realencyclopädie der classischen Altertumswissenschaft, the comprehensive multivolume classical encyclopædia, also known as Pauly-Wissowa and RE, published in German and English, and explained more fully on Wikipedia's German site
- Der Kleine Pauly (KlP), Der Neue Pauly (DNP), and Brill's New Pauly (BNP), subsequent versions of the RE, and generally explained more fully on Wikipedia's German site
- Dictionnaire des antiquités grecques et romaines (DAGR), an extensive multivolume classical encyclopædia published in French
- Reallexikon für Antike und Christentum (RAC), a comprehensive and still-in-production encyclopædia on late antiquity and the interactions between ancient Christians, Jews, Greeks, and Romans, published in German
- Harper's Dictionary of Classical Literature and Antiquities
