= R. E. Latham =

English classicist (1907–1992)

- Born: Ronald Edward Latham; 1907
- Died: 1992 (aged 84–85)

Academic background
- Education: Balliol College, Oxford

Academic work
- Discipline: Classics; Literae humaniores

Ronald Edward Latham (1907–1992) was an English classicist best known for his translation of On the Nature of the Universe by Lucretius. He also translated The Travels of Marco Polo and revised Leo Sherley-Price's translation of Bede's Ecclesiastical History of the English People.

== Education ==
Latham was educated at Royal Grammar School, Newcastle upon Tyne and Balliol College, Oxford, where he read Literae humaniores.

== Career ==
In 1934, he was appointed Assistant Keeper at the Public Record Office. His 1938 lectures at the Working Men's College were published in book form as In Quest of Civilization (1946).

In 1968, he was appointed the first editor of the Dictionary of Medieval Latin from British Sources. In 1977 he retired, and was succeeded by David Howlett.

== Works ==
- In Quest of Civilization. London: Jarrolds, 1946.
- (tr.) On the nature of the universe, by Lucretius. Harmondsworth: Penguin, 1951.
- (tr.) The travels of Marco Polo, by Marco Polo. Harmondsworth: Penguin, 1958.
- Finding out about the Normans. London: Frederick Muller, 1964.
- (ed.) Revised medieval Latin word-list from British and Irish sources. London: Published for the British Academy by the Oxford University Press, 1965.
- Calendar of Memoranda Rolls - Exchequer - preserved in the Public Record Office, Michaelmas 1326 - Michaelmas 1327. London: Public Record Office, 1968.
- (tr.) Ecclesiastical history of the English people, with Bede's letter to Egbert and Cuthbert's letter on the death of Bede. Harmondsworth: Penguin, 1990.
