= Simon Hornblower =

English historian of ancient Greece (born 1949)

Simon Hornblower, FBA (born 29 May 1949) is an English classicist and academic. He was Professor of Classics and Ancient History in the University of Oxford and, before retiring, was most recently a senior research fellow at All Souls College, Oxford. He is known for his work on classical Greek historiography, particularly on Herodotus and Thucydides, and for editing the third and fourth editions of the Oxford Classical Dictionary.

== Biography ==
Born in 1949, he was educated at Eton College, where he was a King's Scholar and twice medallist ('66, '67) in the Newcastle Scholarship, before being awarded a scholarship to Jesus College, Cambridge, where he took a first class in Part I of the Classical Tripos in 1969, and was taught for a time by Moses (later Sir Moses) Finley. He then moved to Balliol College, Oxford, where he took first-class honours in Literae Humaniores in 1971 (BA and hence subsequently MA) and a DPhil in 1978 with a thesis entitled Maussollos of Karia.

In 1971, he was elected to a Prize Fellowship of All Souls College, Oxford, which he held until 1977. From 1978 until 1997, he was university lecturer in ancient history in the University of Oxford and fellow and tutor in classics at Oriel College, Oxford, including one year, 1994/95, in which he was a member of the Institute for Advanced Study in Princeton, New Jersey. He moved to University College London, where in 1998 he was appointed professor of classics and ancient history. In 2006 he was promoted with the title Grote Professor of Ancient History, retaining the title professor of classics.

He was elected a Fellow of the British Academy in 2004.

Hornblower was elected to a senior research fellowship at All Souls College, Oxford, taking up his appointment in Michaelmas Term 2010. At the same time, the Recognition of Distinction Committee conferred upon him the title Professor of Classics and Ancient History. He retired at the end of the term of his fellowship in 2016.

== Scholarship ==
Hornblower has published on classical Greek historiography (especially Herodotus and Thucydides) and the relation between historical texts as literature and as history. He has published an historical and literary commentary on Thucydides in three volumes (Oxford University Press, 1991, 1996, 2008). He further published in this area with the single-author volume Thucydides and Pindar: Historical Narrative and the World of Epinikian Poetry (Oxford University Press, 2004). He is also co-editor, with Professor Catherine Morgan of King's College London, of Pindar's Poetry, Patrons, and Festivals: From Archaic Greece to the Roman Empire (OUP, 2007), a collection of papers by experts on historical, literary, archaeological and anthropological aspects of Pindar and his world. While at UCL, Hornblower turned his attention to the Hellenistic-era poet Lycophron and his cryptic poem the Alexandra, again examining the interface between this poem and the writing of history. At All Souls, he published a text, translation and commentary on the Alexandra (Oxford University Press, 2016) and a monograph on the poem which explored the historical implications of its being dated to the early second century BC.

Since 1979, he has been involved with the Lexicon of Greek Personal Names and co-edited Greek Personal Names: Their Value as Evidence (Oxford University Press, 2000), a role in which he co-operated closely with Elaine Matthews.

In 1996, he co-edited the third edition of the Oxford Classical Dictionary. In 2012, he edited the fourth and most recent edition.

== Bibliography ==
- Hornblower, Simon (1982), Mausolus, Clarendon Press, ISBN 978-0-19-814844-9, OCLC 8362763
- Hornblower, Simon; Greenstock, M C (1984), The Athenian empire, London Association of Classical Teachers, ISBN 978-0-903625-17-3, OCLC 17210907
- Hornblower, Simon (1983), The Greek world, 479-323 BC, London, ISBN 978-0-416-75000-3, OCLC 9685870
- Hornblower, Simon (1987), Thucydides, Johns Hopkins University Press, ISBN 978-0-8018-3529-2, OCLC 15252903
- Hornblower, Simon (1994), Greek historiography, Clarendon Press, ISBN 978-0-19-814931-6, OCLC 29564218
- Hornblower, Simon; Spawforth, Antony (1996), The Oxford classical dictionary, Oxford, ISBN 978-0-19-268767-8, OCLC 34284310
- Hornblower, Simon; Spawforth, Antony (2000), Who's who in the classical world, Oxford University Press, ISBN 978-0-19-280107-4, OCLC 49260425
- Burn, A R; Walbank, F W; Hornblower, Simon (2002), The Folio history of Ancient Greece, Folio Society, OCLC 50578593
- Hornblower, Simon (2004), Thucydides and Pindar : historical narrative and the world of Epinikian poetry, Oxford, ISBN 978-0-19-924919-0, OCLC 56655274
- Hornblower, Simon; Morgan, Catherine (2007), Pindar's poetry, patrons, and festivals : from archaic Greece to the Roman Empire, Oxford, ISBN 978-0-19-929672-9, OCLC 71238475
- Hornblower, Simon (2010) Thucydidean Themes, Oxford, ISBN 978-0-19-956233-6
- Hornblower, Simon (2015) (Translation, Commentary, and Introduction), Lykophron:Alexandra Oxford ISBN 978-0-19-957670-8
- Hornblower, Simon (2018) Lykophron's Alexandra, Rome, and the Hellenistic World, Oxford, ISBN 978-0-19-872368-4
- Hornblower, Simon (2022) (Translated with Introduction and Notes) Lykophron: Alexandra, Oxford, 2022 ISBN 978-0-19-886334-2
- Hornblower, Simon (2024) Hannibal and Scipio: Parallel Lives, Cambridge University Press, ISBN 978-1-00-945335-6
