= Elaine Matthews =

British classical scholar (1942–2011)

- Born: 19 August 1942; Netherton, West Yorkshire, England
- Died: 26 June 2011 (aged 68); Oxford, Oxfordshire, England

Academic background
- Education: St Hilda's College, Oxford

Academic work
- Discipline: Classics
- Sub-discipline: Greek onomastics
- Institutions: University of Oxford

Elaine Matthews BA BPhil (19 August 1942 - 26 June 2011) was a British classical scholar at the University of Oxford and one of the principal contributors to the Lexicon of Greek Personal Names.

== Education and career ==
Matthews was an alumna of St Hilda's College, Oxford, where she took a BA in Literae Humaniores (1960–64) and was a pupil of Barbara Levick. She went on to take the MPhil (then BPhil) in Ancient History, working on Lucian. After a break to raise her two daughters, Matthews embarked on a research career in Greek onomastics at the University of Oxford. In 2010, after she had retired, she was the dedicatee of a Festschrift on Ancient Greek personal names in honour of her distinguished career, containing a collection of scholarly essays on Greek onomastics but with an appreciation of Matthews as a scholar by Alan Bowman as its first chapter.

She was a supernumerary fellow of St Hilda's College, Oxford, from 1996 and was honorary secretary for the Society for the Promotion of Roman Studies, of which she was also a trustee, for twenty-one years.

== Personal life ==
Matthews was born in Netherton, Yorkshire, but grew up in Birmingham. Her father was a police officer. She died of cancer, aged 68, in 2011.

== Selected publications ==
- A Lexicon of Greek Personal Names I-IV (with Simon Hornblower). Oxford: Clarendon Press, 1987–2005.
- Greek Personal Names: Their Value as Evidence (with Simon Hornblower). Proceedings of the British Academy 104. Oxford: Oxford University Press, 2000.
- Old and New Worlds in Greek Onomastics. Edited by Elaine Matthews. Proceedings of the British Academy 148. Oxford: Oxford University Press, 2007.
