= Lexicon Mediae et Infimae Latinitatis Polonorum =

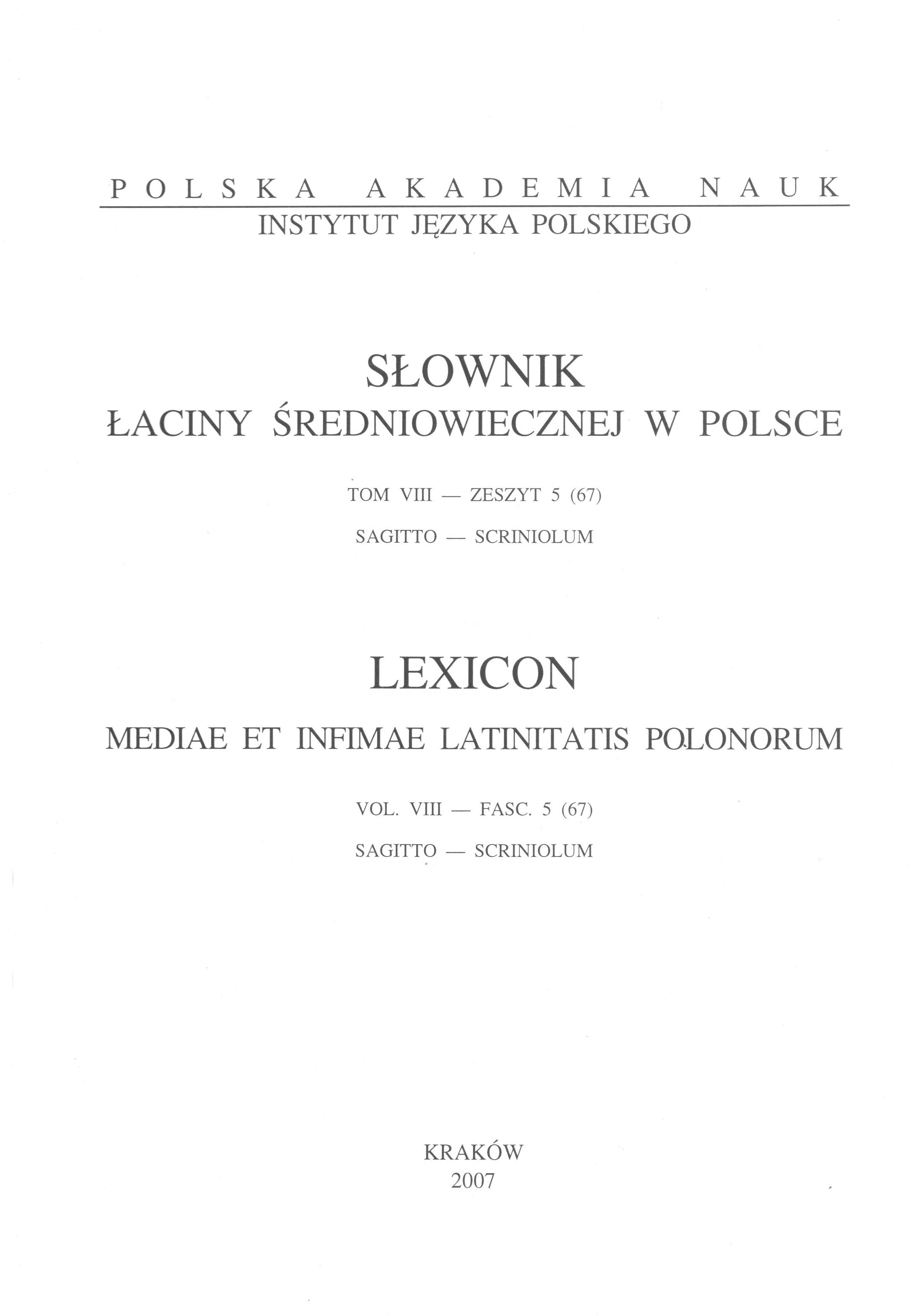
Fascicle 67 (sagitto-scriniolum)

Lexicon Mediae et Infimae Latinitatis Polonorum ('Lexicon of Middle and Low Latin of the Poles'; Polish Słownik łaciny średniowiecznej w Polsce) is the most comprehensive dictionary of the Latin language as was used in Poland from the 10th to the middle of the 16th century. Administratively, the dictionary belongs to the Institute of the Polish Language, Kraków, which is incorporated in the Polish Academy of Sciences.

== History ==
As with similar dictionaries in other European countries, the origins of the Lexicon Mediae et Infimae Latinitatis Polonorum date from a project launched through the Union Académique Internationale in 1920, which aimed to compile a great common dictionary of Medieval Latin based on excerpts from the different national sources. Since the initiative at that time was not fully possible to be accomplished and caused many technical problems, it eventually resulted in the establishment of a number of separate, national dictionaries after suggestions given by Dr Plezia. In Poland, preparatory work started immediately (under the auspices of the Polish Academy of Learning), and the majority of the excerpts were collected in the years 1924–1939. Subsequently, due to the outbreak of the Second World War, progress on the dictionary was impeded for some years.

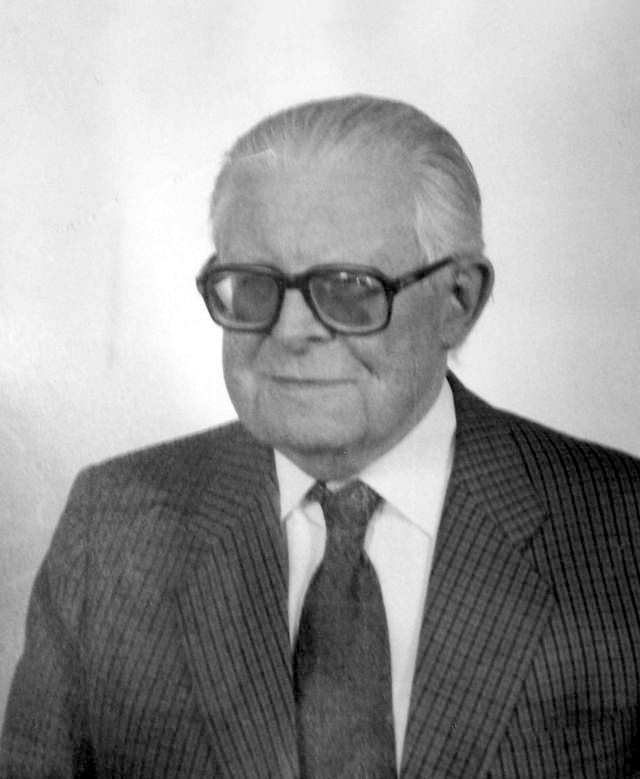
Prof. Marian Plezia

The first fascicle was published only in 1953, under the direction of the late Prof. Marian Plezia (1917–1996), longstanding editor of the Lexicon until his retirement in 1988. Prof. Krystyna Weyssenhoff–Brozkowa (1934–2007) was appointed as his successor, and performed the function until 2005, when Michał Rzepiela was appointed editor. The editorial team numbers six persons.

== List of fascicles ==
Since 1953, seventy four fascicles have been published, making it seven volumes completed to date (A–Q) plus most of the eighth volume (as of 2024, R–Superlucror).

- Vol. I (fascicles 1–8): A–Byssus
- Vol. II (fascicles 1(9)–10(18)): Cabaciolum–Czweczko
- Vol. III (fascicles 1(19)–10(28)): Dabilis–Exuvium
- Vol. IV (fascicles 1(29)–6(34)): F–Hystrix
- Vol. V (fascicles 1(35)–10(44)): I–Lyrista
- Vol. VI (fascicles 1(45)–8(51)): M–Oxymel
- Vol. VII (fascicles 1(52)–11(62): Pabulamen–Quout
- Vol. VIII (fascicles 1(63)–12(74)): Rabalipton–Superlucror

== See also ==
- Marian Plezia
- Dictionary of Medieval Latin from British Sources
- Medieval Latin

== External sources ==
- Official Website of the Lexicon
- Polish Academy of Sciences
- Institute of the Polish Language
