= Friedrich Bechtel =

German philologist and linguist

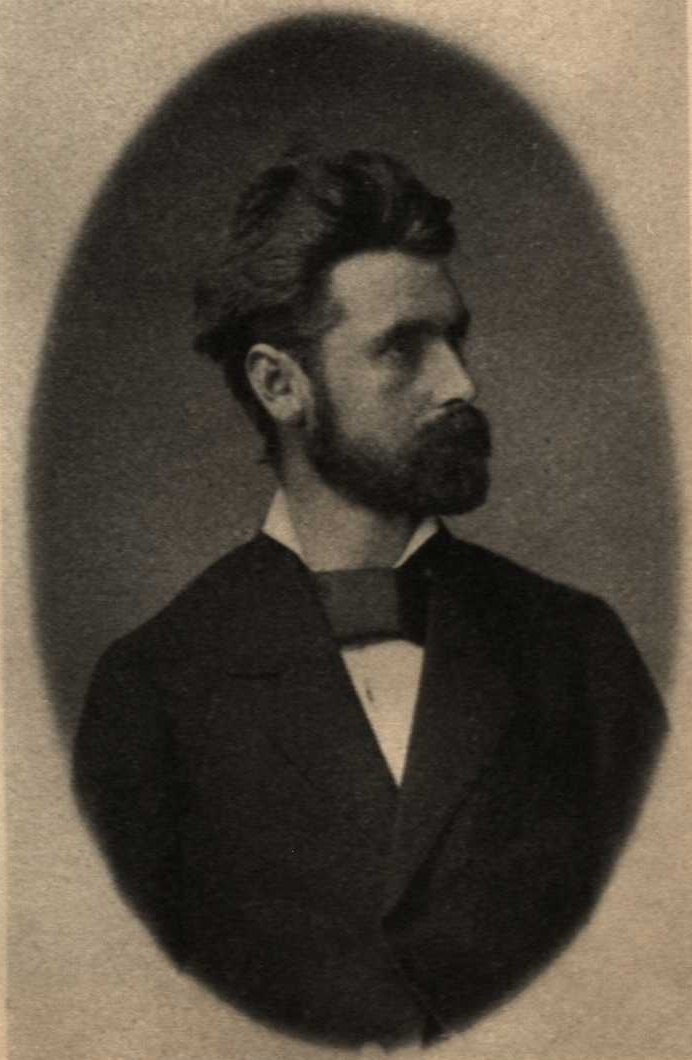
- Born: 2 February 1855; Durlach, German Empire
- Died: 9 March 1924 (aged 69); Halle an der Saale, Weimar Republic

Academic background
- Education: University of Göttingen

Friedrich Bechtel (2 February 1855, in Durlach – 9 March 1924, in Halle an der Saale) was a German philologist and linguist of Indo-European languages, known for his research of Greek dialects.

He studied languages at the University of Göttingen, where his influences included philologists Theodor Benfey and August Fick. In 1878, he obtained his habilitation for comparative linguistics at Göttingen, becoming an associate professor in 1884. From 1881 onward, he was editor of the journal Göttingschen Gelehrten Anzeigen. In 1895, he was appointed professor of comparative linguistics at the University of Halle.

== Selected works ==
- Ueber die Bezeichnungen der sinnlichen Wahrnehmungen in den indogermanischen Sprachen, 1879 – On the designations of sensory perceptions in Indo-European languages.
- Sammlung der griechischen Dialekt-Inschriften, with Hermann Collitz (4 volumes, 1884–1915) – Collection of Greek dialect inscriptions.
- Die Inschriften des ionischen Dialekts, 1887 – Inscriptions of Ionic Greek dialects.
- Die Hauptprobleme der indogermanischen Lautlehre seit Schleicher, 1892 – The main problems of the Indo-Germanic phonetic theory of August Schleicher.
- Die griechischen Personennamen nach ihrer Bildung erklärt und systematisch geordnet, with August Fick (2nd edition, 1894) – Greek personal names, etc.
- Die attischen Frauennamen nach ihrem Systeme dargestellt, 1902 – Attic Greek feminine names.
- Lexilogus zu Homer; Etymologie und Stammbildung homerischer Wörter, 1914 – Lexilogus to Homer; etymology and development of Homeric words.
- Die historischen Personennamen des griechischen bis zur Kaiserzeit, 1917 – Historical Greek personal names prior to the imperial period.
- Die griechischen Dialekte (3 volumes 1921–24) – Greek dialects.
