= James Diggle =

British classical scholar (b. 1944)

James Diggle CBE, FBA (born 29 March 1944) is a British classical scholar. He was Professor of Greek and Latin at the University of Cambridge between 1995 and 2011.

== Early life and education ==
Born in 1944, Diggle was educated at Rochdale Grammar School and St John’s College, Cambridge; he completed Part II of the Classical Tripos in 1965, and went on to complete his doctoral studies there; his PhD was awarded in 1969.

== Academic career ==
Diggle was appointed a research fellow at Queens' College, Cambridge, in 1966 and was elected to an official fellowship the following year. He was the college librarian from 1969 to 1977 and praelector from 1971 to 1973 and again from 1978 to 2015. He was also an assistant lecturer in classics at the University (1970–75) and then lecturer until 1989, when he was appointed to a readership. He was then Professor of Greek and Latin from 1995 until he retired in 2011. Diggle also served as Public Orator between 1982 and 1993.

Between 1981 and 1994 he edited the three-volume Oxford edition of the tragedies of Euripides, which has since been regarded as the standard edition. He is editor of the Cambridge Greek Lexicon, published in 2021.

In 1985, Diggle was elected a Fellow of the British Academy, the United Kingdom's national academy for the humanities. He was appointed Commander of the Order of the British Empire (CBE) in the 2022 New Year Honours for services to classical scholarship.

== See also ==
- Comparison of Ancient Greek dictionaries
