= David Alphonso Talboys =

David Alphonso Talboys (c. 1790–1840) was an English bookseller, known as a publisher, translator, and local politician.

== Life ==
Born around 1790, Talboys established himself as a bookseller in Bedford before moving his business to Oxford, where he became renowned for his knowledge of the book trade. In 1823, he formed a partnership with James Luff Wheeler, the university bookseller, who married his daughter Anne Ophelia. Talboys & Wheeler then began publishing the "Oxford English Classics" series, in collaboration with William Pickering of Chancery Lane, London.

On 1 December 1827, Talboys was admitted to the privileges of Oxford University membership. He played a leading role in Oxford city affairs, serving as a councillor for the east ward and holding the office of sheriff. After the 1835 election, Talboys emerged as the leader of the radical reformers in Oxford municipal affairs, and, alongside Charles Sadler, a moderate reformer, he implemented changes in charity organisation. However, he faced opposition from the Oxford Herald, controlled by Philip Bliss, who attempted to boycott his business.

Talboys died on 23 May 1840, leaving behind a widow and seven children.

His son-in-law was Archibald MacLaren, a gymnast and fencing master.

== Works ==
Talboys was the author of Oxford Chronological Tables of Universal History, 1835 and 1840. He referenced James Bell's Compendious view of universal history and literature, in a series of tables (1820) and adopted some of the typographical conventions of Bell. Together Bell and Talboys are considered to have innovated influentially, in the use of bold type for cueing, in a way that carried over into textbook design.

Talboys made translations of Arnold Hermann Ludwig Heeren's Researches into the Politics, Intercourse, and Trade of the Carthaginians, Ethiopians, and Egyptians (1832) (from the Ideen of Heeren) and Manual of the Political System of Europe (1834). He translated also Friedrich von Adelung's Historical Sketch of Sanscrit Literature (Oxford, 1832), making additions and corrections.

== Notes ==
Attribution

This article incorporates text from a publication now in the public domain: Lee, Sidney, ed. (1898). "Talboys, David Alphonso". Dictionary of National Biography. Vol. 55. London: Smith, Elder & Co.
