= Robert Scott (philologist) =

British academic and priest (1811–1887)

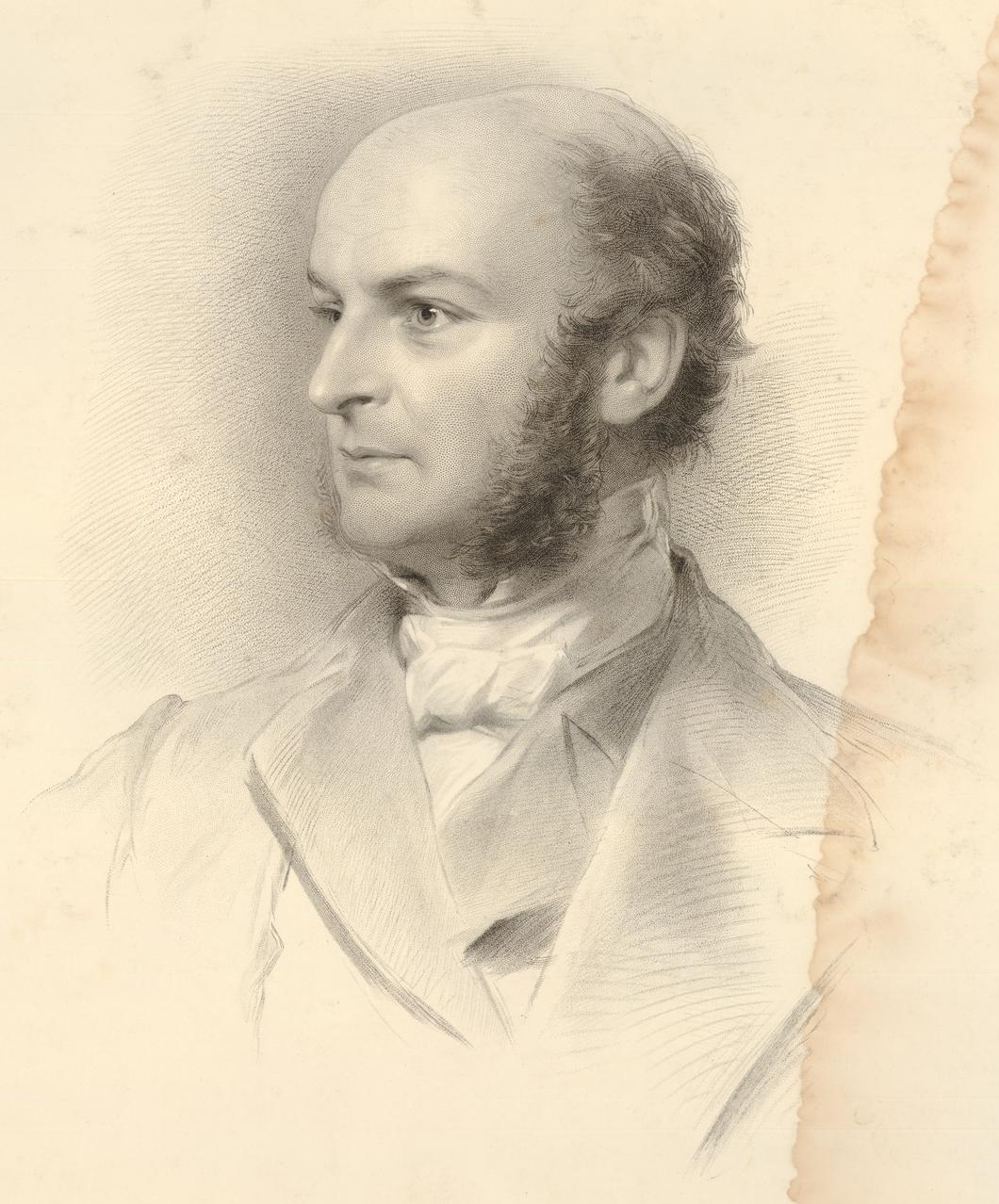
- 1865 engraving of Scott
- Born: 26 January 1811; Bondleigh, United Kingdom
- Died: 2 December 1887 (aged 76); Rochester, United Kingdom
- Occupation: Philologist
- Notable work: A Greek-English Lexicon

Robert Scott (26 January 1811 – 2 December 1887) was a British academic philologist and Anglican clergyman. He is best known for co-authoring the Greek-English Lexicon, commonly known as Liddell and Scott, which is still in use today. Scott was also a professor of Greek at the University of Oxford for over thirty years before his death on 2 December 1887.

== Biography ==
Scott was born on 26 January 1811 in Bondleigh, Devon, England. He was educated at St Bees School in Cumbria, and Shrewsbury School in Shropshire. He studied classics at Christ Church, Oxford, graduating with a Bachelor of Arts (BA) degree in 1833.

Scott was ordained in 1835 and held the college living of Duloe, Cornwall, from 1845 to 1850. He was a prebendary of Exeter Cathedral from 1845 to 1866 and rector of South Luffenham, Rutland, from 1850 to 1854 when he was elected Master of Balliol College, Oxford. He served as Dean Ireland's Professor of the Exegesis of Holy Scripture at Oxford from 1861 to 1870 and as the Dean of Rochester from 1870 until his death in 1887.

Scott is best known as the co-editor (with his colleague Henry Liddell) of A Greek-English Lexicon, the standard dictionary of the classical Greek language. According to the 1925 edition of the Lexicon, the project was originally proposed to Scott by the London bookseller and publisher David Alphonso Talboys; it was published by the Oxford University Press.

In 1872, Scott was taken with Lewis Carroll's "Jabberwocky" poem published the year before, and he wrote the first known German translation of the piece. He engaged Carroll in an exchange of letters wherein he jocularly claimed his German version, called "Der Jammerwoch", was the original, with Carroll's being the translation.

Academic offices
Preceded by Richard Jenkyns	Master of Balliol College, Oxford; 1854–1870	Succeeded by Benjamin Jowett
