= Perseus Digital Library =

Digital library of Tufts University

- Location: Tufts University
- Scope: Ancient Greece, Ancient Rome, Arabic Materials, Germanic Materials, 19th-century America, Early modern English literature, Richmond Times Dispatch and Humanist and Renaissance Italian Poetry in Latin
- Established: 1987

Other information
- Director: Gregory Crane
- Website: perseus.tufts.edu/hopper

The Perseus Digital Library, formerly known as the Perseus Project, is a free-access digital library founded by Gregory Crane in 1987 and hosted by the Department of Classical Studies of Tufts University. One of the pioneers of digital libraries, its self-proclaimed mission is to make the full record of humanity available to everyone. While originally focused on the ancient Greco-Roman world, it has since diversified and offers materials in Arabic, Germanic, English Renaissance literature, 19th century American documents and Italian poetry in Latin, and has sprouted several child projects and international cooperation. The current version, Perseus 4.0, is also known as the Perseus Hopper, and is mirrored by the University of Chicago.

== Purpose ==
The Perseus Digital Library was created to provide access to materials of the history of humanity to everyone, with Gregory Crane, the editor-in-chief of the library, stating that "access to the cultural heritage of humanity is a right, not a privilege".

=== Open Source ===
This notably means that the Perseus Digital Library tries not to be exclusive to academics but aims to be accessible to everyone. To reflect this, the library supports open-source content and has published its code on SourceForge. The website is written in Java, uses sustainable formats such as XML and JPEG, and includes native support for the Greek, Latin and Arabic alphabets. It allows users to download all materials that belong to the public domain along with the Creative Commons rights information that specify their conditions of use. While automated downloading is not authorized, in order to protect items subject to intellectual property, the library offers download packages to the public.

The Perseus Digital library also adheres to sets of standards edified by other projects. It follows the norms of the Text Encoding Initiative for its XML mark-up. In the same vein, the library has applied the Canonical Text Services (CTS) protocol regarding citations to its classical Greek-Latin corpus.

Following this philosophy, Perseus chooses to use copyright-free texts, be it in the primary readings or in their translations and commentaries. For these reasons, the texts hosted necessarily date at the latest from the 19th and early 20th century, and must be divided into books, chapters and sections to be displayed individually. As such, those translations and commentaries can be outdated compared to the current state of the research, which can prove problematic when most of the now canonically accepted versions of ancient texts were established and sectioned later, during the 20th century. Perseus however tries to make rare and out-of-print materials accessible, and, for some texts, the material one can find on the website is the only one that was produced, which makes it especially valuable to scholars.

Some content is restricted by intellectual property license agreements with the holders of the rights to that material. This is notably the case for the pictures of artifacts that come from partnership with museums.

== History ==
The Perseus Library is one of the first digital libraries to have been created, and is widely regarded as a pioneer in the field and a role model of other similar initiatives.

The Perseus Library first originated as a branch of the Thesaurus Linguae Graecae, from a full-text retrieval tool on Ancient Greek materials made by Gregory Crane, who became the editor-in-chief of the project ever since it was created. The goal of the library was to provide a wider access to knowledge, past the academical field; to quote the mission statement, "to make a full record of humanity, as intellectually accessible as possible, to every human being, regardless of linguistic or cultural background".

The planning period took place from 1985 to 1988, with the development of the Ancient Greek collection starting in 1987 thanks to funding from the Annenberg-CPB Project which allowed the Perseus Project to be developed.

Perseus 1.0, or HyperCard Perseus, was a CD-ROM released in 1992 by Yale University, using the Apple HyperCard for Macintosh. For practical reasons, it was limited to ancient Greek materials, and contained the texts of nine major Greek authors along with an English translation and commentary. The collection was enriched by use of hyperlink technology and contextual material such as pictures of artifacts, an atlas as well as an historical timeline, and an encyclopedia of places, people and terminology, in an attempt to help non-academic users gain access to the material. Perseus 1.0 got nonetheless criticized for its "difficulty of use and odd content, both specialised and lacking". Furthermore, it was not a true digital library, but rather more a CD-ROM of primary readings published with various additional information.

A second version of the CD-ROM came in 1996 in the form of Perseus 2.0, which mainly expanded the collection of pictures. It was still limited to McIntosh computers, until a platform-independent version got released in 2000.

Hardware limitations induced costs and limited the scope of the projects, which ultimately led to the CD-ROM versions of Perseus only covering Greek material. Moreover, they were very expensive: even though the price was to only make minimal profits, the CDs cost between $150 and $350 depending on the amount of material included, and were only released in North America, which severely limited worldwide accessibility.

After moving to Tufts University in 1993, the Perseus Library switched to a website version in 1995 written in Perl. Thanks to this new interface, Perseus-Online could reach a wider audience. However, Perseus was still bound by copyright agreements made with the CD-ROM company, which limited the reuse of material.

Perseus 2.0 Online expanded the collection in 1997, adding Roman materials as well as Renaissance texts of Shakespeare and Marlowe. This version also introduced a search bar on the website, as well as articles which presented information on Heracles and the Olympic Games, which were quite successful. In 1999, a grant from the Digital Library Initiative Phase 2 allowed Perseus to expand into other areas of Humanities and to create collections on the History of London and the American Civil War.

Perseus 3.0 released in 2000 directly on the web. This version expanded and revised the website, adding new collections, but it was subject to some issues when it came to making links to material stable and consistent.

The current version of Perseus, Perseus 4.0, also known as the Perseus Hopper, was released in 2005, with Perseus 3.0 coexisting alongside and slowly fading out, until it got taken down in 2009. This time, the website was based on Java, written in the open-sourced language Hopper and TEI-compliant XML. The shift allowed Perseus to produce its own XML-encoded texts, which were not bound by copyright agreements. The Greek, Latin and English collections were released in 2006 under a Creative Commons License. The source code got subsequently released in 2007.

Perseus has nowadays branched into other projects: the Scaife Viewer, which is the first phase of the work towards Perseus 5.0, the Perseus Catalog, which provides links to the digital editions not hosted by the Perseus Library, the Perseids Project, which aims to support access to Classics scholarship by providing tools to foster language acquisition, facilitate working with documents, and encourage research, and, more recently, the Beyond Translation project, which aims to combine the Scaife Viewer with new versions and services of Perseus 4.0.

Furthermore, the library has been cooperating internationally with Leipzig University, with several projects emerging, such as the Ancient Greek and Latin Dependency Treebank for classical philology, Leipzig Open Fragmentary Texts Series (LOFTS) which focuses on fragmentary texts, the Open Greek and Latin Project, and Open Persian.

== Content ==
=== Collections ===
The Perseus Digital Library contains online collections on the Humanities pertaining to different subjects. The main collection focuses on the classical materials of ancient Greece and ancient Rome, and features an extensive number of texts written in Ancient Greek and Latin chosen for their status as a canonical literary text, in a degree of completeness and representativeness no other digital library can claim. It has however been noted that the materials that weren't included on account on not being traditionally studied are further devalued by the lack of representation.

The library does not only host primary readings. Partnerships with museums allowed it to build a consequent collection of artifacts which showcases pictures of coins, sculptures, vases, but also gems, buildings and sites, as well as information concerning the context of artifact and its current location. Moreover, Perseus includes commentaries and translations that are free of copyright. However, to be free of copyright, texts have to be sufficiently old, and, as a result, Classics scholars have insisted that the commentaries and translations provided by Perseus cannot be used in an academical setting due to their age and the existence of more recent editions for the most often researched texts.

Although the classical section is the most complete and established of the website, the Perseus Digital Library is not limited to this collection, and has branched throughout its existence into other categories of knowledge. Materials on early modern English literature are as such available, and used to be called the Perseus Garner. They consisted of a heterogeneous compilation of primary materials from the early modern period in England, as well as selected secondary materials from the nineteenth and early twentieth centuries, comprising the works of Christopher Marlowe, the Globe Shakespeare, volumes from the New Variorum Shakespeare Series, Raphael Holinshed's Chronicles, Richard Hakluyt's Voyages and the rhetorical works of Henry Peacham and Thomas Wilson, among other primary sources. Several reference works, include glossaries and lexicons, are also included. This collection of texts has however been criticized for its choices of inclusion, and described as neither balanced nor complete, and texts not included are devalued by their absence.

Records from American Memory, a corpus of electronic versions of the Library of Congress archival collections related to the cultural heritage of the United States, were harvested in order to offer a collection on the history of the 19th-century United States. This third-party collection was further completed by materials on the American Civil War. This sub-collection, as well as materials on the Humanist and Renaissance Italian Poetry in Latin and the Richmond Times Dispatch, are regarded as fairly complete due to their narrow subject.

Perseus also hosts a variety of documents on the study of Germanic people, such as Beowulf and a variety of sagas in Old Norse along with translations. This sub-section has been described as fairly good, considering that this field of research is less well researched than the other.

Finally, the Perseus Digital Library hosts Arabic materials, but its selection is limited to the Quran and dictionaries.

The Library used to host the Bolles Collection of the History of London, a digitized recreation of an existing special collection homogeneous in theme but heterogeneous in content, which interlinks maps of London, relevant texts, and historical and contemporary illustrations of the city. The collection got transferred to the Tufts Digital Library. The same can be said of the Duke Databank of Documentary Papyri and the history of Tufts, which used to be on the website as well (Perseus). A section on the history of mechanics also used to be present on Perseus.

=== Use of technology ===
The Perseus Library follows the goal of digital humanities, which is to capitalize on the use of modern technology to further research in classics and facilitate understanding of the material. As such, it uses a variety of tools to enrich the texts it hosts.

One of the way it does so is by automatically linking the texts to additional materials. Interlinks exist between a primary reading, its different versions, and its translations and commentaries. Users can also find maps of places mentioned in the texts as well as a historical timeline, and search tools allow readers to look for a text by its author or the presence of a specific lemma or word. Perseus also enhanced its texts through TEI-compliant markup language, which allows each word to be linked to a dictionary entry, a morphological analysis tool known as Morpheus, a word frequency tool, and other texts where the word is used. Since the mark-up is automatically generated, older sections of the libraries have been noted to be less rich and complete than newer ones. This structure allows for a machine-readable and searchable environment, and one of Perseus' goals is the automated generation of knowledge through text and data mining.

Each section of a text and item is also given a stable identifier of 10 digits, which makes citations possible in the form of four different URIs (text, citation, work, catalog record) containing URNs; furthermore, metadata schemes are employed as to make each section or object meaningful outside of the context of the library. Those sections are also given a Creative Commons license indicating conditions of use. However, one should note the lack of a TEI-header containing bibliographical information and metadata about the respective source, and that such information needs to be searched for on the Perseus Catalog.

As a result of the use of this technology, Perseus has been useful to scholars of classical philology and history in facilitating the study of the material, but also to students who have benefited from the various tools the library offers.

=== Criticism on the website ===
The website has been criticised for being ergonomically poor and unintuitive, and new users may have problems accessing resources due to a confusing layout which seems to prioritize showcasing the Perseus Digital Library over its collections. The lack of presentation for collections accentuates this problem. Accessibility is another issue, with pages not always adhering to the standards of the Section 508 Amendment to the Rehabilitation Act of 1973.

=== Sustainability ===
Perseus has proven convincing in terms of sustainability throughout its long history and ability to evolve, having notably been able to migrate from the SGML format to XML in Perseus 4.0. The preservation of the collections is further insured by a Fedora Commons Backend created in 2002 as well as a mirror site provided by the University of Chicago.

== Responsibility ==
=== Key actors ===
The Perseus Digital Library has been under the consistent leadership of its founder and editor in chief Gregory Crane. The library is nowadays located at Tufts University with a full-time staff of eight members, consisting of Gregory Crane, Marie-Claire Beaulieu, who has joined the project in 2010 and become its Associate Editor in 2013, Bridget Almas, lead software developer of the Perseus Digital Library and one of the primary programmers of the Alpheios Project, Alison Babeu, Digital Librarian and Research Coordinator of the library since 2004, Lisa Cerrato, Managing Editor who was a part of Perseus since 1994, and Anna Krohn, digital library analyst and lead developer of the Perseus Catalog. Frederik Baumgardt and Tim Buckingham are also noted as working on the Perseids Project full time, respectively as Data Architect and Senior Research Coordinator. A list of former staff and students can be found on the Perseus website.

=== Funding ===
A long list of agencies provided funding and grants to the Perseus Digital Library over the years. According to the home page of the Perseus website, the list of recent financial supporters includes: the Alpheios Project, the Andrew W. Mellon Foundation, the United States Department of Education, the Institute of Museum and Library Services, the National Endowment for the Humanities as well as private donors, and Tufts University. The Mellon Foundation, Tufts University, Harvard University's Center for Hellenic Studies and, mainly, the National Endowment for the Humanities are specifically noted as key donors that made the Beyond Translation project possible.

Additional support for the Perseus project has been provided over the years by the Annenberg Foundation, Apple Inc., the Berger Family Technology Transfer Endowment, the Digital Libraries Initiative Phase 2, the Fund for the Improvement of Postsecondary Education part of the U.S. Department of Education, the Getty Grant program, the Modern Language Association, the National Endowment for the Arts, the National Science Foundation, the Packard Humanities Institute, Xerox, Boston University, and Harvard University.

== See also ==
- List of digital library projects
