= The Brill Dictionary of Ancient Greek =

Ancient Greek dictionary

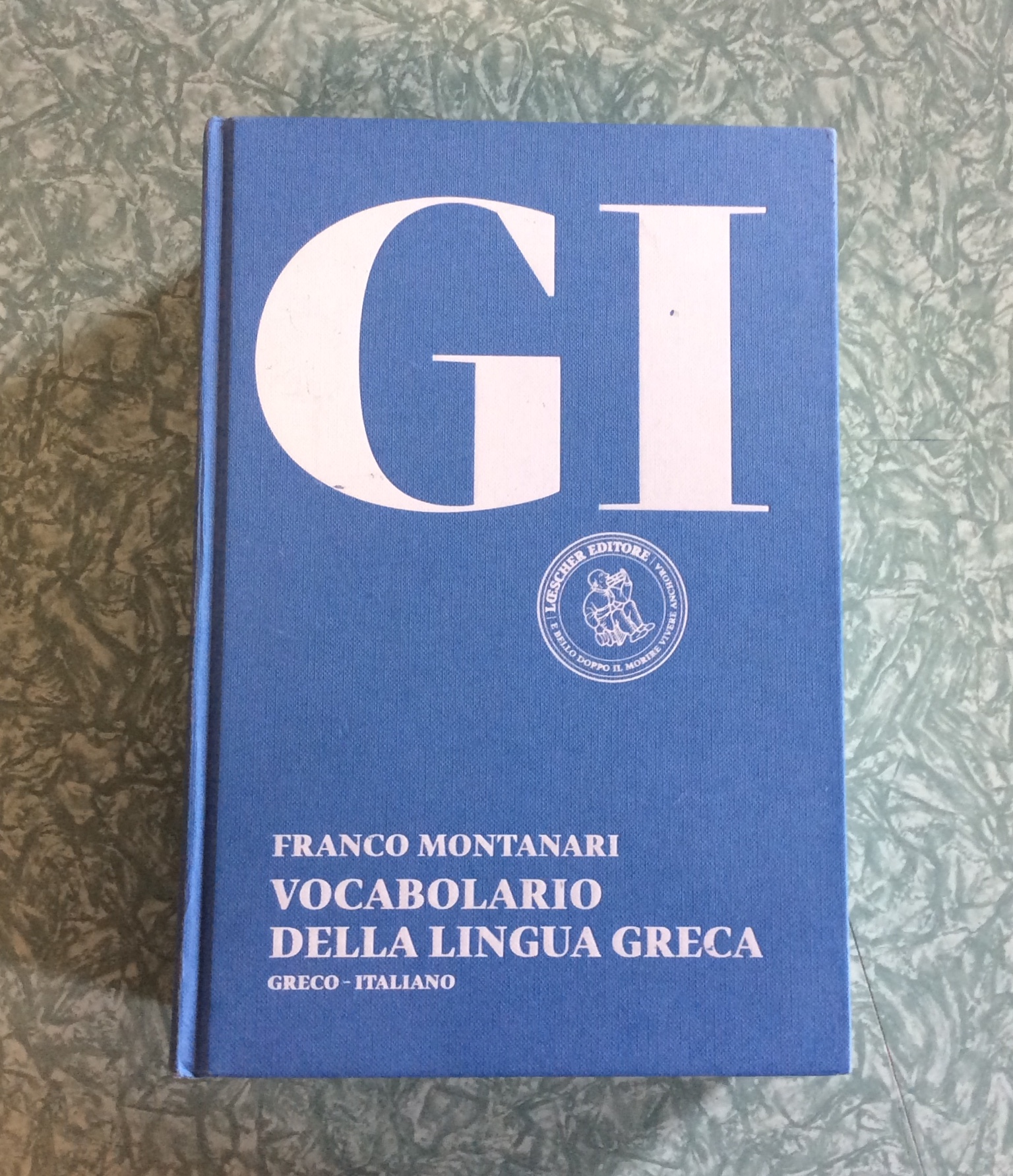
- Cover of the Italian 3rd edition
- Author: Franco Montanari
- Original title: GI - Vocabolario della lingua greca
- Language: Italian, English, Modern Greek, German
- Published: 1995 (1st edition, Loescher), 2015 (Brill Publishers)
- Publication place: Italy, United States
- Media type: Print (hardcover)
- Pages: 2431
- ISBN: 9789004193185

The Brill Dictionary of Ancient Greek is an English language dictionary of Ancient Greek, translated, with the addition of some entries and improvements, from the third Italian edition of Franco Montanari's GI - Vocabolario della lingua greca. It's mostly a new lexicographical work, not directly based on any previous dictionary. It has about 140,000 entries over 2500 pages.

The Italian third edition has been published in 2013 (first edition in 1995), a Modern Greek translation has been published in 2013, and the English edition has been published by Brill in 2015, edited by Madeleine Goh and Chad Schroeder, and a German translation was published in September 2023 by De Gruyter. There is also an online version, which can also be subscribed by universities and other institutions.

== Bibliography ==
- Panagiotis Filos (2018) The Brill Dictionary of Ancient Greek (review) in Bryn Mawr Classical Review
- Franco Montanari 2015 video interview, with English subtitles, about the English edition
