= Diccionario Griego-Español =

The Greek–Spanish Dictionary (DGE) is a recent link in the long chain of European lexicographical tradition of general dictionaries of Ancient Greek, the first of which could be considered the Thesaurus Graecae Linguae of Henri Estienne (a.k.a. Henricus Stephanus, Paris, 1572). The Greek–Spanish Dictionary resumes this tradition at the level reached by its immediate predecessor, Liddell-Scott-Jones's A Greek–English Lexicon (LSJ) dictionary in its ninth edition (Oxford 1925–1940). Through many years, this project, carried out in the Department of Classics of the Institute of Philology at the Consejo Superior de Investigaciones Científicas (CSIC) in Madrid, has received funds from the Spanish Ministry of Education in several ways, lately through Acciones Especiales. It also has been supported at several times by groups such as Fundación March and Fundación A. G. Leventis.

In the beginning, the goals aimed for were not as ambitious as today. Having in mind an audience of university students, the editors basically attempted to adapt into Spanish the best existing Greek dictionaries. They also intended to supplement them in neglected fields, replace their older editions with newer ones and correct mistakes.

Nevertheless, at the very beginning of the work, classical philologists had felt the need for a new bilingual dictionary from Ancient Greek into a modern language. Such a dictionary necessarily had to be based on a wider collection of materials, as well as on a new careful study and organization of those materials according to modern lexicographical criteria, taking advantage of recent advances in linguistics. Earlier editions of LSJ's dictionary, though regularly used by Greek scholars, were in many senses out of date, in spite of supplements, and the Greek lexicon required a thorough revision.

That revision involved, first, incorporating Mycenaean Greek and Patristic writings, as well as personal and place names, which were all absent from the LSJ. Besides the increasing mass of words showing up in new literary and documentary texts, new critical editions of well-known texts and the necessary revision of their interpretation in the light of the current state of the art mandated a dictionary on new foundations. As for the etymological element, the tremendous development of Indo-European linguistics all through the 20th century had also to be taken into account.

== See also ==
- Comparison of Ancient Greek dictionaries
