= Phaethon (play) =

Lost Ancient Greek tragedy by Euripides

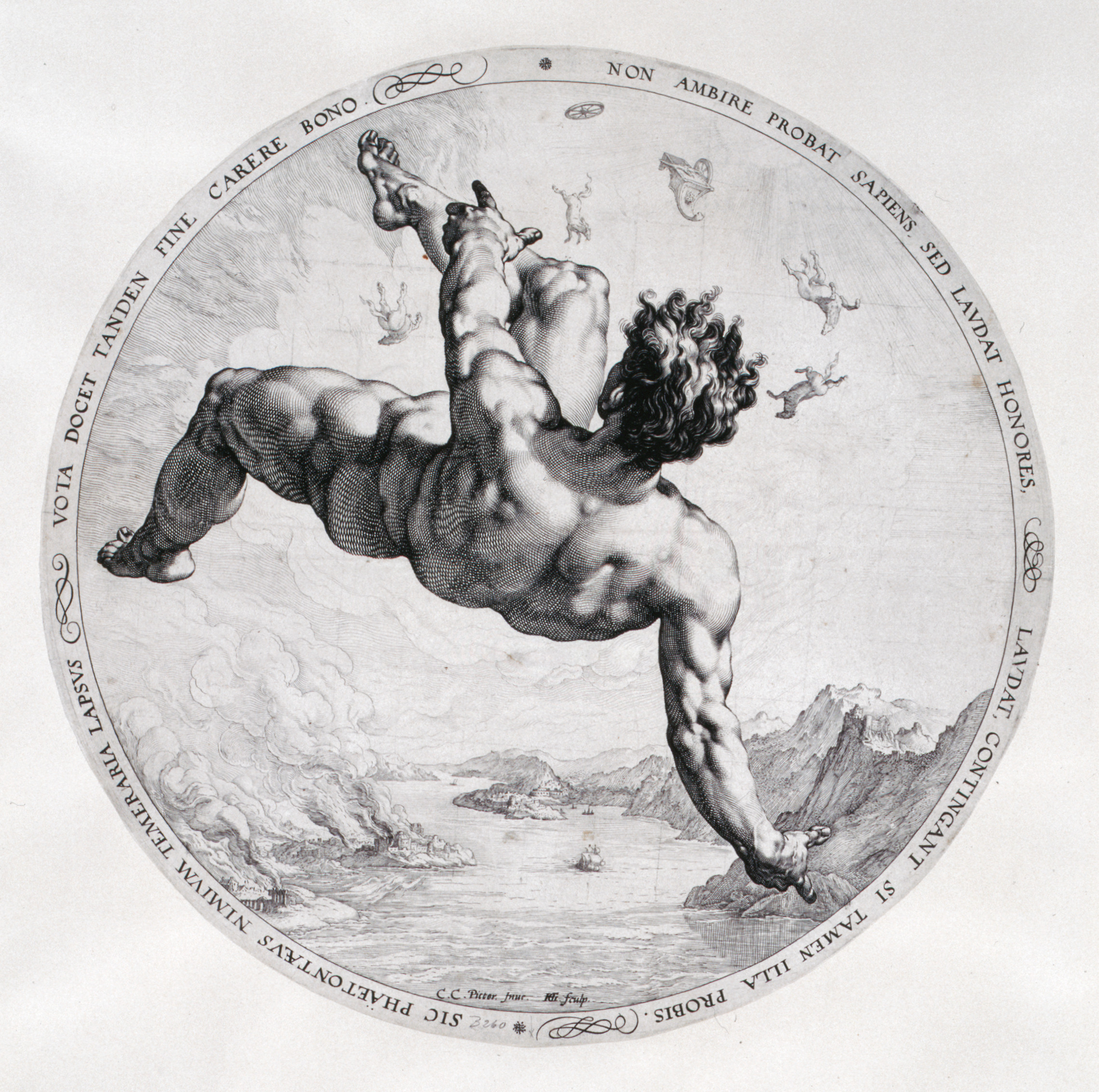
- Phaethon falls from the chariot, by Hendrick Goltzius, made in 1588
- Original language: Ancient Greek
- Written by: Euripides
- Chorus: Parthenoi, virgin women
- Characters: Phaethon; Clymene; Merops; Helios ? Messenger
- Genre: Tragedy
- Setting: Aethiopia

Premiere
- Date: c. 420 BC
- Place: Athens

Phaethon (Ancient Greek: Φαέθων, romanized: Phaéthōn) is the title of a lost tragedy written by Athenian playwright Euripides, first produced circa 420 BC, and covered the myth of Phaethon, the young mortal boy who asked his father the sun-god Helios to allow him to drive his solar chariot for a single day. The play has been lost, though several fragments of it survive.

Another treatment of the myth had been delivered earlier by Aeschylus in his lost play Heliades ("daughters of the Sun"), whose content and plot are even more fragmentary and obscure. The influence of Euripides' play on Ovid's version of the myth can be easily recognized. From this now lost play only twelve fragments remain, covering around 400 lines or so.

== Plot ==
Euripides' version of the myth was set in a mortal landscape, with Phaethon nominally the son of the Oceanid nymph Clymene by her lawful husband and putative father of her children Merops, king of the far-eastern land of Aethiopia, (Note: Diggle notes that the setting being Aethiopia means that Merops and the chorus are dark-skinned, but both Clymene and Phaethon are white. An alternative view is that Euripides' emphasis on the sun scorching their neighbours but keeping his heat moderate for them means that the entire palace of Merops was white.) but in truth her product of an illicit affair with Helios. The play opens with Clymene describing the sunlit country, her marriage to Merops, and her liaison with Helios that produced Phaethon.

The conflict presented in the play is the marriage of Phaethon and the boy's reluctance; the bride's identity is one of the most difficult problems of this plot; suggestions include one of the Heliades, his sisters (a suggestion supported by Henri Weil and one that James Diggle deemed unprovable, though convinced of that being the case), or even Aphrodite. Explaining on how Aphrodite could be considered Phaethon's bride, Wilamowitz suggested that Euripides combined the stories of two Phaethons, that of the son of Helios who drove his father's chariot and died, and that of Phaethon the son of Helios' sister Eos whom Aphrodite abducted to be a watchman of her shrines, and whom late-antique writers described as a lover of the goddess. Another explanation is that Aphrodite had planned Phaethon's death from the beginning, as a revenge against his father who revealed her extramarital affair with Ares to her husband Hephaestus.

Perhaps to get her son overcome his reluctance, Clymene revealed to Phaethon his true, divine parentage, and urged him to go travel and find his father to confirm so himself, mentioning that the god had promised to grant one favour back when he slept with her; convinced of the truth of his mother's words, Phaethon agrees to travel and find his biological father. What follows is the parodos, where the chorus, made up of the palace's slave girls, describe the dawn and express their enthusiasm over Phaethon's upcoming marriage. Then, in the first episode, few lines survive of an argument between Merops and Phaethon.

Nothing survives from the first stasimon. Next someone, perhaps a paedagogus bringing a message to Clymene, arrived on scene and explained how Phaethon drove his father's chariot while said father rode on a horse named Sirius next to him, trying to guide his son and shouting advice and instructions on how to drive the chariot at him; due to the play's fragmentary nature, it is not clear whether Zeus had a role in Phaethon's demise. If the messenger did witness the flight himself, it is possible there was also a passage where he described Helios taking control over the bolting horses in the same manner as Lucretius described.

Subsequently, the still smoking body of Phaethon is brought on scene, which points to Zeus having indeed struck him with a thunderbolt. Clymene orders the slave girls to hide the body from Merops and laments Helios' role in his demise, noting that he is rightfully called "Apollo" (here understood to mean "destroyer") by the mortals who know the gods' true names. (Note: This Euripidean fragment in fact constitutes one of the earliest evidence for the identification of the two gods.) The remainder of the plot seems to have revolved around Merops finding the charred corpse and the real parentage of Phaethon. Near the end, Merops, who has now discovered the truth about Phaethon's fatherhood, seems to try to retaliate against Clymene by killing her as the chorus advises Clymene to plead with her father, the river god Oceanus to save her from perishing; it is unclear whether Clymene survives thanks to an ex machina intervention by a god, as well as that god's exact identity, whether it is Oceanus indeed trying to save his daughter, Helios or even Athena. Diggle suggests that Clymene and Merops were reconciled in the end.

Of unknown position in the play is a fragment in which Clymene expresses hatred over the handy horned bow, and youths' pastime exercises, as they remind her of her slain son. At another points she cries that her "best beloved, but now he lies [a]nd putrefies in some dark vale".

== Other works ==
In one of the earliest surviving artistic attestations of the myth, a cast taken from an Arretine mould now housed in the Museum of Fine Arts, Boston, Phaethon is shown falling from the chariot, while Helios with a spare horse (as Euripides alone described) by his side has caught two horses and is preparing to catch the other two. Several other figures appear, like Zeus holding his thunderbolt, Tethys, Artemis, Iris and maybe Isis.

== Bibliography ==
Editions, translations, and commentaries

- Collard Christopher, Cropp Martin, Lee Kevin H.; Euripides: Selected Fragmentary Plays: Volume I, Oxbow Books, United Kingdom, 1995, ISBN 978-0-85668-619-1.
- Christopher Collard, Martin Cropp; Euripides: Fragments: Oedipus-Chrysippus. Other Fragments Loeb Classical Library 506. Cambridge, MA: Harvard University Press, 2009.
- Diggle, James, Euripides: Phaethon, Cambridge University Press, Cambridge Classical Texts and Commentaries, Series Number 12, 1970, ISBN 978-0-521-60424-6.
- Onori, Silvia (2023). L'auriga dal breve destino: commento critico-esegetico ai frammenti del Fetonte di Euripide. Tübingen: Narr Francke Attempto. ISBN 978-3-381-10761-2.

Primary witnesses

- Plutarch, Moralia, Volume VII: On Love of Wealth. On Compliancy. On Envy and Hate. On Praising Oneself Inoffensively. On the Delays of the Divine Vengeance. On Fate. On the Sign of Socrates. On Exile. Consolation to His Wife, translated by Phillip H. De Lacy, Benedict Einarson, Loeb Classical Library No. 405. Cambridge, Massachusetts, Harvard University Press, 1959. ISBN 978-0-674-99446-1. Online version at Harvard University Press.
- Plutarch, Moralia, Volume VIII: Table-Talk, Books 1-6, translated by P. A. Clement, H. B. Hoffleit, Loeb Classical Library No. 424, Cambridge, Massachusetts, Harvard University Press, 1969. ISBN 978-0-674-99466-9. Online version at Harvard University Press.
- Strabo, The Geography of Strabo. Edition by H.L. Jones. Cambridge, Mass.: Harvard University Press; London: William Heinemann, Ltd. 1924. Online version at the Perseus Digital Library.

Discussions

- Cook, Arthur Bernard, "Zeus God of the Bright Sky" in Zeus: A study in ancient religion, Cambridge University Press, 1914, Online text available at Internet Archive.
- Gantz, Timothy, Early Greek Myth: A Guide to Literary and Artistic Sources, Johns Hopkins University Press, 1996, Two volumes: ISBN 978-0-8018-5360-9 (Vol. 1), ISBN 978-0-8018-5362-3 (Vol. 2).
