= Megarian Decree =

Economic sanctions imposed by the Delian League on Megara

The Megarian Decree was a set of economic sanctions levied upon Megara c. 432 BC by the Athenian Empire shortly before the outbreak of the Peloponnesian War. This move is considered one of the first uses of economics as a foreign policy tool. The decree addressed the Megarians' supposed trespass on land sacred to Demeter known as the Hiera Orgas, the killing of the Athenian herald who was sent to their city to reproach them, and giving shelter to slaves who had fled from Athens. The Megarian decree effectively blocked Megara from trading in any port within the Delian League, isolating the city and greatly damaging its economy. The exact influence the Megarian Decree had on the beginning of the Peloponnesian War is a matter that is highly debated to this day.

== Background ==
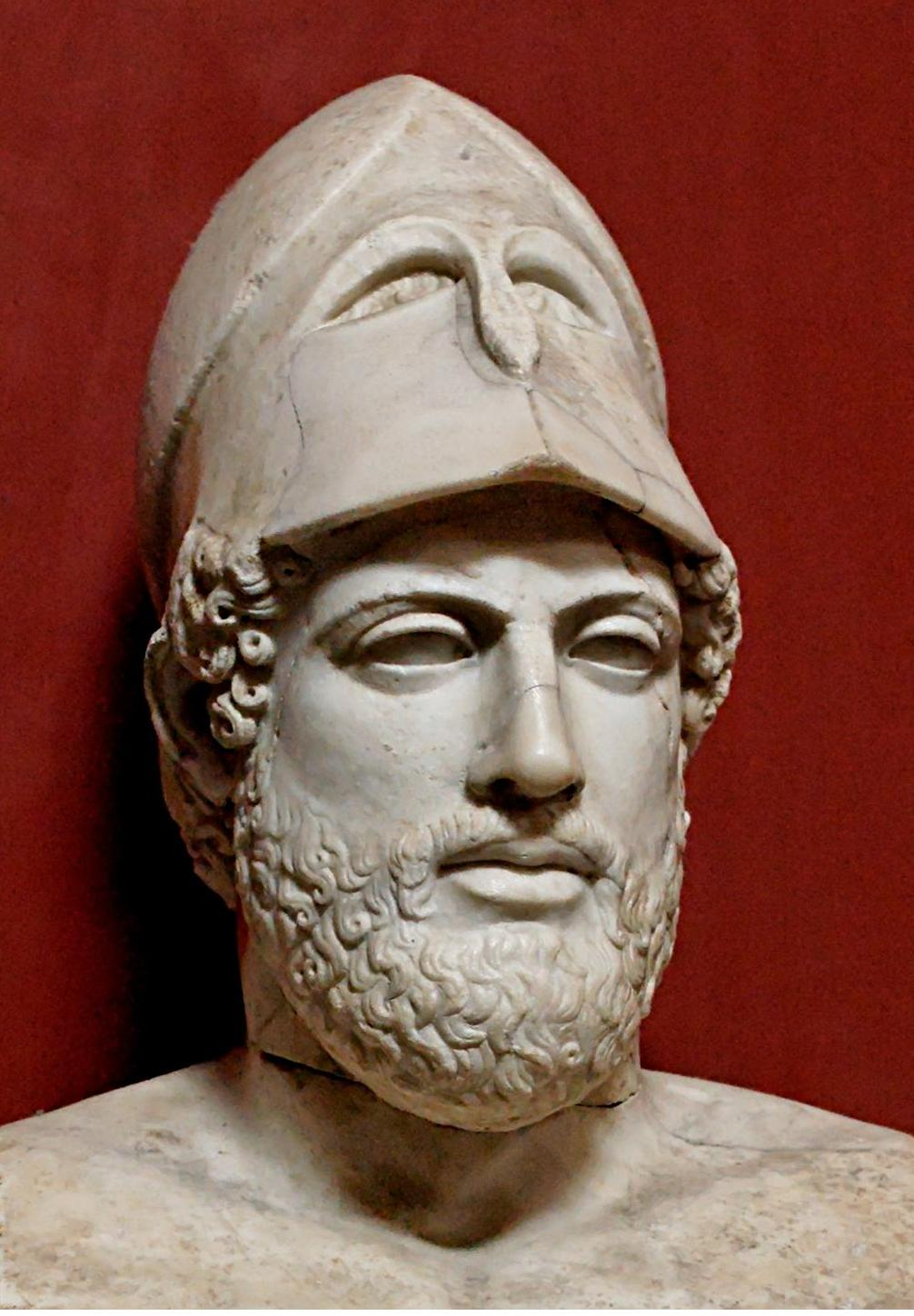
Pericles, the sponsor of the Megarian Decree

The Megarian Decree was seen as an act of revenge by the Athenians for the treacherous behaviour of the Megarians some years earlier. It may also have been a deliberate provocation towards Sparta on the part of Pericles, who was the sponsor of the decree. Aristophanes also cited that it was enacted to avenge the theft of the female attendants of Aspasia, who was Pericles' partner, but this is generally taken to be a joke at Pericles' and Aspasia's expense. There are scholars who view the Megarian Decree as one of the main causes of the Peloponnesian War.

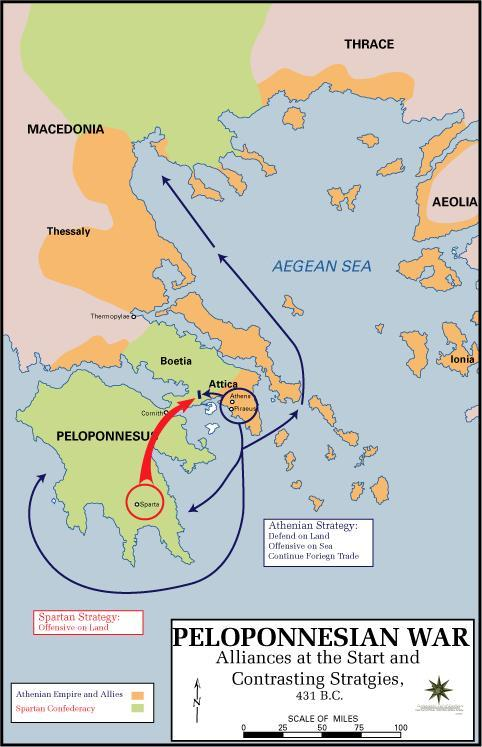
Map of Alliances during the Peloponnesian War

The economic blockade banned Megarians from harbours and marketplaces throughout the large Athenian Empire, which effectively strangled the Megarian economy. The sanctions would have also affected Megara's allies and may have been seen as a move by Athens to weaken its rivals and to extend its influence. Megara controlled the important routes between Peloponnese and Attica, making it crucial for both Athens and Sparta. The ban strained the fragile peace between the two states. The Peloponnesian War began after Megara appealed to Sparta, its ally, for help. In the build-up to the conflict, the repeal of the decree was Sparta's main demand to the Athenians. Thucydides mentions that the revoking of the Megarian decree was only one of several demands made by the Spartans if Athens wished to avoid war, other demands included: an end to the siege of Potidaea, the immediate independence of Aegina, and that the Athenians will not infringe on the independence of the Hellenes.

== Significance ==
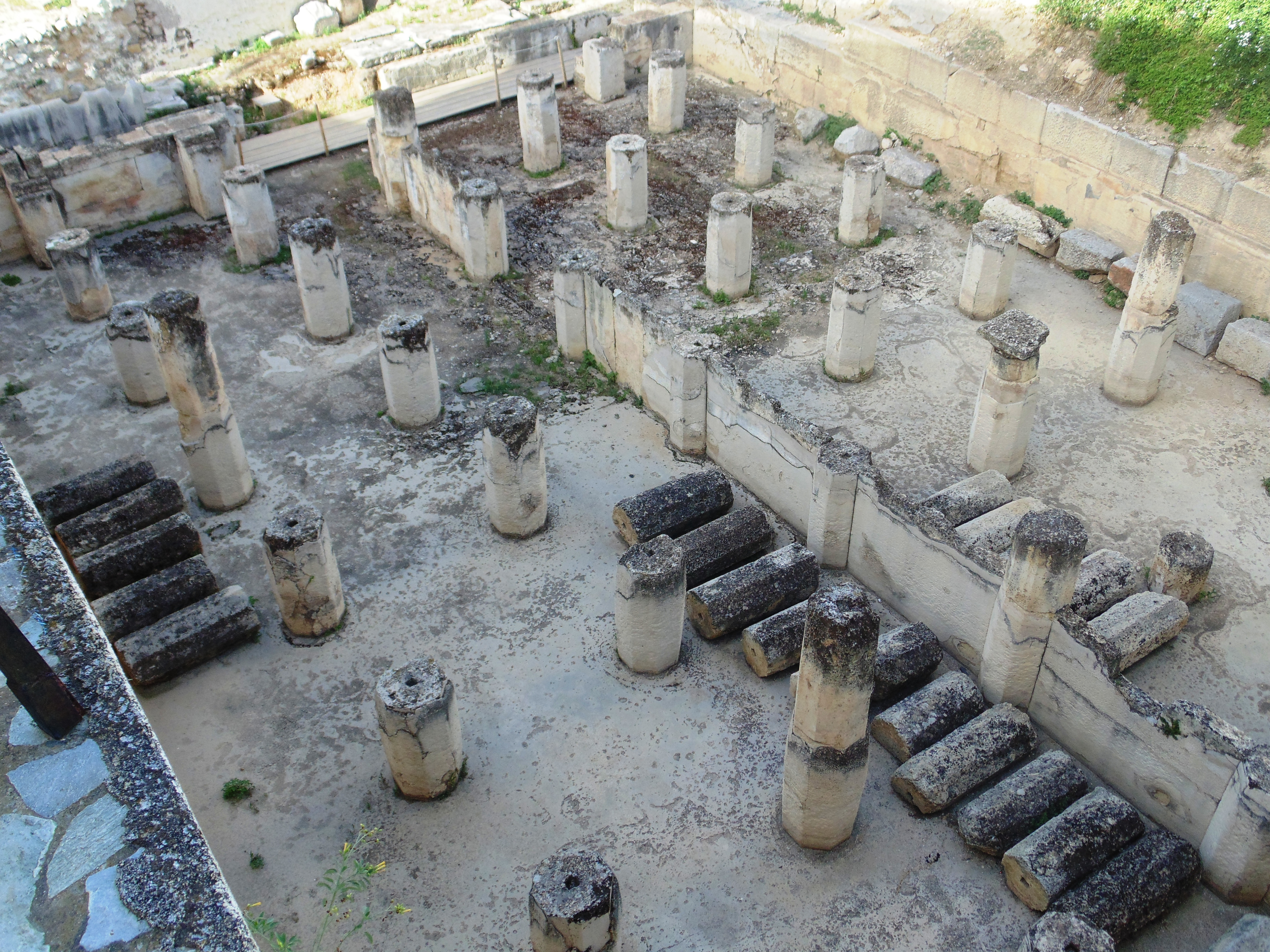
Modern day archeological site at city of Megara

The extent to which the decree encouraged the outbreak of the Peloponnesian War is the subject of debate. The primary source for the war, Thucydides, puts very little emphasis upon the decree in his analysis of the cause of the war and treats it as a pretext on the part of the Spartans. Thucydides considers the true cause of the war to be Sparta's fear of Athens' growing empire. He does not describe the decree in detail, unlike for the conflicts over Potidaea and Corcyra.

Map of Ancient Greece and Aegean Sea

The main evidence for the significance of the decree is Aristophanes, an ancient playwright and satirist of the time. His play The Acharnians (II.530-7) mentions how the decree left the Megarians "slowly starving" and caused them to appeal to the Spartans for aid. Another of Aristophanes's plays, Peace, also mentions how war was being brewed in Megara by the god of war. However, as these are comedic plays meant to entertain, their veracity as historical records are questionable.

Oblique references to the decree in Thucydides seems to suggest its importance since the Spartans state that "war could be avoided if Athens would revoke the Megarian decree". However, Thucydides also reports that the Spartans had sought a declaration of war from the Peloponnesian League during the rebellion of Samos in 440, well before the Megarian decree had been passed.

Plutarch (Pericles 29) wrote that had the Athenians repealed the Megarian Decree "it seems unlikely that any of the other issues would have brought war down on the Athenians." For this reason he believed that Pericles, because he was "the most ardent opponent of reconciliation ... alone was responsible for the war."

Donald Kagan interprets the decree as an attempt by Athens to solve a problem without breaking the Thirty Years' Peace with Sparta. Megara had injured Athens in a way that required some meaningful response, but Athens openly attacking the Spartan ally would violate the peace. Athens thus imposed the embargo, which was meant to show other Spartan allies that Athens had commercial means of punishing attackers who were under Sparta's military protection. Thus, the decree could be seen as an attempt to avoid provoking Sparta directly.

== Alternative Interpretations ==
The historical revisionist G. E. M. de Ste. Croix argues that a trade sanction would not significantly affect Megara as the decree applied only to Megarian citizens although the majority of trade in all cities was likely conducted by metics (foreigners or outsiders), who would be unaffected by a ban on citizens of Megara. The scholar attributed the war to the Spartan zeal for war, which he said was driven by a number of factors such as a sense of invincibility, its vulnerability as a polity, and the danger posed by its massive slave population.

De Ste. Croix also highlights the uncertainty regarding the context in which the decree was passed. At the beginning of the Second Peloponnesian War, the Athenians invaded Megara twice a year with large forces to ravage their land and maintained a naval blockade. After six years, there were few or no remaining crops, which may account for the "starvation" suggested in The Acharnians. De Ste. Croix also points out that the decree would have been only effective in a context prior to the war for one year since the Megarians would have had no right of entry to markets in any war situation.
