= Opora (mythology) =

Greek fruit goddess

- Goddess of harvest, fruit and autumn
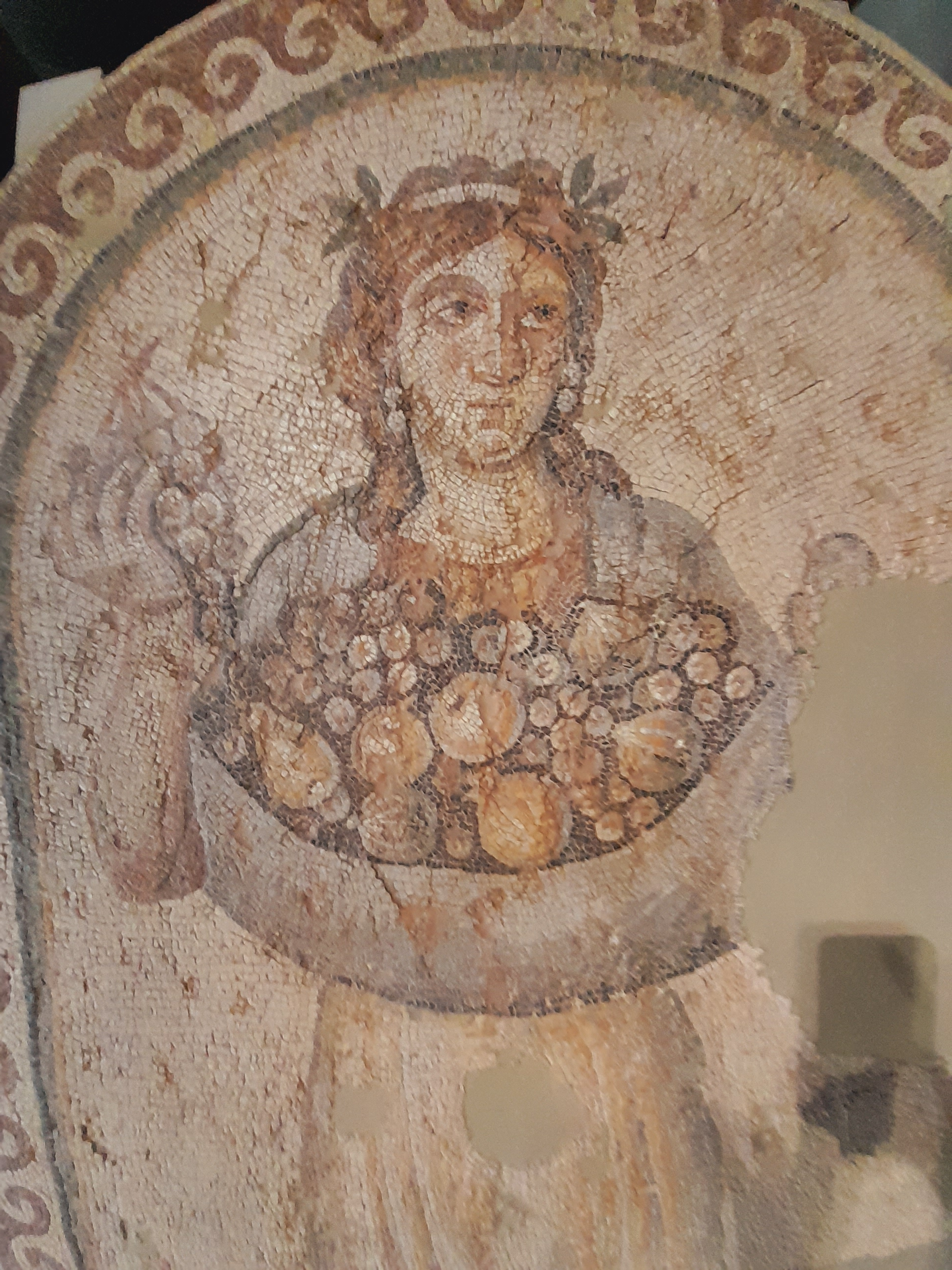
- A Roman 4th-century mosaic of Phthinoporon (Autumn) in the Byzantine Museum of Argolis, Greece.
- Other names: Opore
- Greek: Ὀπώρα
- Abode: Earth
- Symbol: Fruit
- Texts: Peace
- Consort: Sirius, Trygaeus

In ancient Greek mythology and religion, Opora (Ancient Greek: Ὀπώρα, romanized: Opṓra, lit. 'autumn, fruit') is a minor goddess connected to fruit, the harvest, especially wine harvest, and the season of autumn. She is a fairly obscure goddess, although she features in a little-known myth centered around her romance with the stellar god Sirius, the Dog Star.

From the Hellenistic period onwards, Opora began to be considered one of the Horae, goddesses of the seasons. Although she does not have a proper counterpart in Roman mythology, a close equivalent can be found in the fertility goddess Pomona.

== Etymology ==
The ancient Greek noun Opora referred to the part of the year between the rising of the stars Sirius and Arcturus, that is the end of July, all August and part of September at the end of summer; later it was used for late summer and autumn. In extension of its use for fruit-time it could refer to fruit itself, and figuratively to summer-bloom.

The word apparently derives from the base of ὀψέ meaning "late, after" and ὥρα meaning "hour, time". Robert Beekes suggests the Proto-Indo-European roots *h_{1}opi meaning 'at, on' and *h_{1}os-r/n- meaning 'harvest-time, summer'. It seems to be a contraction of an original form *ὀποσάρα (*op-osára) or *op-ohara, ultimately from a Proto-Indo-European root *(s)h₁ósr̥ or *h₁ósh₂r, meaning the harvest season.

The later Greek word for autumn, φθινόπωρον (phthinópōron), covering September through November, is derived from her name and literally translates to 'end of the opora'.

== Mythology ==
Her parentage is not specified in any surviving text.

Opora accompanies Irene, the goddess of peace and plenty, along with Theoria (who represents festive delegation) in Athenian comedian Aristophanes's comedy Peace; the god of commerce Hermes suggests to the character of Trygaeus, a middle-aged Athenian man who brought about a peaceful end to the Peloponnesian War, to marry Opora, whom he liberated from a celestial prison. Trygaeus's name (Ancient Greek: Τρυγαῖος, romanized: Trugaîos) seems to derive from the Ancient Greek noun τρύγη (trúgē) which means grain crop, and in particular grape crop, denoting Opora's connection to the wine harvest and viticulture.

Opora has only one myth in whose plot she is central. While on a mission on the earth back when stars still made visits, the dog star Sirius sees Opora and falls madly in love with her. When he is unable to be with her, he starts burning with even greater heat due to his unrequited love. The humans, suffering, appeal to the gods for help. Boreas then, the god of the north wind, sends his sons to hand Opora over to Sirius while he cools down the heat with blasts of cold wind. It thus has parallels to the myth of Phaethon and the fiery chariot of his father. Sirius then goes on to glow every summer during harvest time in commemoration of this event and his great love, explaining the heat of the so-called dog days of summer, which was attributed to the star in antiquity.

== Culture ==
Opora is a personification of the late-summer bounty of fruit, ripeness and harvest—specifically the grape harvest. She can be potentially interpreted as a Hora (season goddess) representing late summer or early autumn, especially in the Hellenistic period. Aristophanes is the earliest source where Opora appears as a clear, defined personification, and the connection between Dionysus and the seasons goes back at least as Homer.

The Sirius story is generally believed to have originated from the lost play entitled Opora, by the Athenian playwright of Middle Comedy Amphis, and a work of the same name by Amphis's contemporary Alexis. The myth has been transmitted mostly though scholia written after their time, with the surviving manuscripts containing numerous corruptions, errors and transliteration mistakes; it is highly likely that these scholia also drew upon a lost work of Eratosthenes, which probably quoted the play by Alexis.

In ancient Greece the opora and the heat that came with it was traditionally associated with the star Sirius; Homer calls Sirius the star of the opora, although Sirius' rising does not coincide perfectly with the season.

== Iconography ==
A number of pictorial representations of the goddess Opora have passed down to our times. An ancient floor mosaic discovered in ancient Daphne in modern-day Turkey and now housed in the Baltimore Museum of Art depicts Opora in the company of two more divinities, Agros ("field") and Oinos ("wine") at dinner. Moreover, she is also identified on a number of ancient Greek vase paintings; on two ancient Athenian vases, Opora appears carrying fruit and accompanying Dionysus, Dionysus's retinue, and Irene. She is also possibly represented on the reliefs of the temple of Serapis and Isis discovered on the site of the present church of Saint Eleutherios in Athens. The most prominent attribute assigned to her in art is the basket of fruit she carries, though this does not mean that every Dionysus-adjacent female figure who carries grapes can be automatically assumed to be Opora.

== See also ==
- Vertumnus and Pomona
- Demeter and Persephone
- Dionysus

== Bibliography ==
- Aristophanes, Peace, in The Complete Greek Drama, volume 2. translated by Eugene O'Neill Jr. New York. Random House. 1938. Online text and translation at the Perseus.tufts project.
- Arnott, William Geoffrey (12 September 1996). Alexis: The Fragments: A Commentary. New York, US: Cambridge University Press. ISBN 0-521-55180-3.
- Beekes, Robert S. P. (2010). Lucien van Beek (ed.). Etymological Dictionary of Greek. Leiden Indo-European Etymological Dictionary Series. Vol. ΙΙ. Leiden, the Netherlands: Brill Publications. ISBN 978-90-04-17419-1.
- Greek Comedians (1847). Meineke, Augustus (ed.). Fragmenta comicorum Græcorum. Vol. 5. Berlin.
- Käppel, Lutz (2006). "Opora". In Cancik, Hubert; Schneider, Helmuth (eds.). Brill's New Pauly. Translated by Christine F. Salazar. Kiel: Brill Reference Online. doi:10.1163/1574-9347_bnp_e832290.
- Kerenyi, Karl (1996). Dionysos: Archetypal Image of Indestructible Life. Translated by Ralph Manheim. Princeton, New Jersey: Princeton University Press. ISBN 978-0-691-02915-3.
- Liddell, Henry George; Scott, Robert (1940). A Greek-English Lexicon, revised and augmented throughout by Sir Henry Stuart Jones with the assistance of Roderick McKenzie. Oxford: Clarendon Press. Online version at Perseus.tufts project.
- Pooth, Roland (2018). There will be 'blood': The etymology of Greek ὀπώρα and Proto-Germanic *asani- and the function of the o-grade in Proto-Indo-European. France, Germany, Belgium: Ghent University.
- Schaffner, Stefan (2001). Das Vernersche Gesetz und der innerparadigmatische grammatische Wechsel des Urgermanischen im Nominalbereich (in German). Innsbruck: Verlag d. Inst. f. Sprachwiss. d. Uni. Innsbruck. ISBN 978-3851246834.
- Slater, William J (1969). Lexicon to Pindar. Berlin, Germany: Walter de Gruyter.
- Smith, Amy C. (June 22, 2011). Polis and Personification in Classical Athenian Art. Leiden, NED: Brill Publications. ISBN 978-90-04-19417-5.
- Tuck, Steven L. (2015). A History of Roman Art. John Wiley & Sons. ISBN 1444330268.
- Weiss, Carina (1994). "Opora". Lexicon Iconographicum Mythologiae Classicae (LIMC). Vol. VII.1: Oidipous – Theseus. Zürich and Munich: Artemis Verlag. ISBN 3-7608-87511. Internet Archive.
