= Amphis =

Athenian comic poet

Amphis (Greek: Ἄμφις) was an Athenian comic poet of uncertain origin from approximately the 4th century BC.

Pollux seems to refer to Amphis as a Middle Comedy poet, and Amphis' own repeated references to the philosopher Plato place him in the early to mid-4th century BC. His name is not Athenian, and he was probably from the island of Andros (thus Kirchner).

== Surviving titles and fragments ==
49 fragments of his comedies survive, along with the following 28 titles.

- Athamas
- Acco
- Aleiptria (The Female Oiler, or Masseuse)
- Alcmaeon
- Ampleourgos (The Vine-Dresser)
- Amphicrates
- Balaneion (The Bath-House)
- Gynaikokratia (Women in Power)
- Gynaikomania (Crazy About Women)
- Daktylios (The Ring)
- Dexidemides
- Dithyrambos (The Dithyramb)
- Hepta Epi Thebais (Seven Against Thebes)
- Erithoi (Day-Labourers)
- Ialemos (The Oaf, or the Dirge)
- Kallisto (Callisto)
- Koniates (The Plasterer)
- Kouris (The Female Barber)
- Kybeutai (The Dice-Players)
- Leukas (The Girl From Leucas)
- Odysseus
- Opora (Autumn Harvest)
- Ouranos (Uranus)
- Pan
- Planos (The Vagabond Acrobat)
- Sappho
- Philadelphoi (Men Who Love Their Brothers)
- Philetairos (The Man Who Loved His Comrades).

The standard edition of the fragments and testimonia is in Rudolf Kassel and Colin François Lloyd Austin's Poetae Comici Graeci Vol. II. The eight-volume Poetae Comici Graeci produced from 1983 to 2001 replaces the outdated collections Fragmenta comicorum graecorum by August Meineke (1839-1857), Comicorum Atticorum Fragmenta by Theodor Kock (1880-1888) and Comicorum Graecorum Fragmenta by Georg Kaibel (1899).
