= Thesmophoriazusae =

Comedy by 5th-century BC Greek playwright Aristophanes

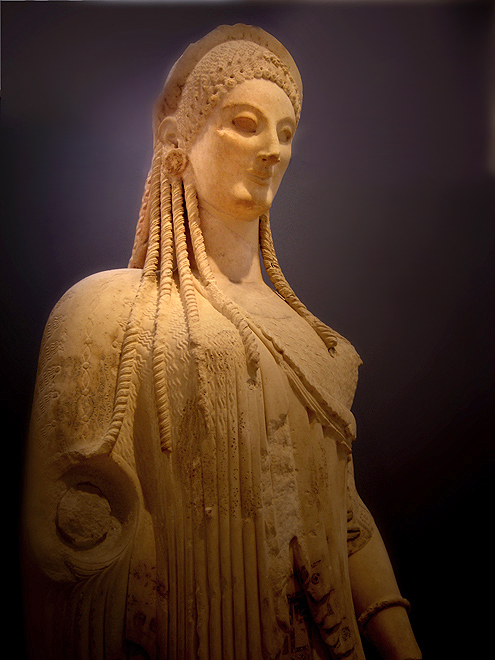
- Kore, daughter of Demeter, celebrated with her mother by the Thesmophoriazusae (women of the festival). Acropolis Museum, Athens. The Dramatis Personae in ancient comedy depends on interpretation of textual evidence. This list is based on David Barrett's translation
- Written by: Aristophanes
- Chorus: 1) Agathon's chorus 2) Women of Athens
- Characters: Euripides A poet; Mnesilochus, an elderly relative of Euripides; Agathon another poet; Cleisthenes (son of Sibyrtius) a notorious homosexual/effeminate; A servant of Agathon; A prytanis (magistrate); A Scythian archer (policeman); Micca ('1st woman'); Myrtle vendor ('2nd woman'); Critylla ('3rd woman'); Herald /leader of Woman's Chorus Silent roles: Manya A maid of Micca; Philista Another maid of Micca; A dancing girl
- Setting: 1) Street outside Agathon's house 2) Forecourt of the Temple of Demeter Thesmophoros

Thesmophoriazusae (Ancient Greek: Θεσμοφοριάζουσαι; Thesmophoriazousai, lit. 'women celebrating the festival of the Thesmophoria'), or Women at the Thesmophoria (sometimes also called The Poet and the Women), is one of eleven surviving comedy plays by Aristophanes. It was first produced in 411 BC, probably at the City Dionysia. The play's focuses include the subversive role of women in a male-dominated society; the vanity of contemporary poets, such as the tragic playwrights Euripides and Agathon; and the shameless, enterprising vulgarity of an ordinary Athenian, as represented in this play by the protagonist, Mnesilochus. The work is also notable for Aristophanes' free adaptation of key structural elements of Old Comedy and for the absence of the anti-populist and anti-war comments that pepper his earlier work. It was produced in the same year as Lysistrata, another play with sexual themes.

How Thesmophoriazusae fared in the City Dionysia drama competition is unknown, but the play has been considered one of Aristophanes' most brilliant parodies of Athenian society.

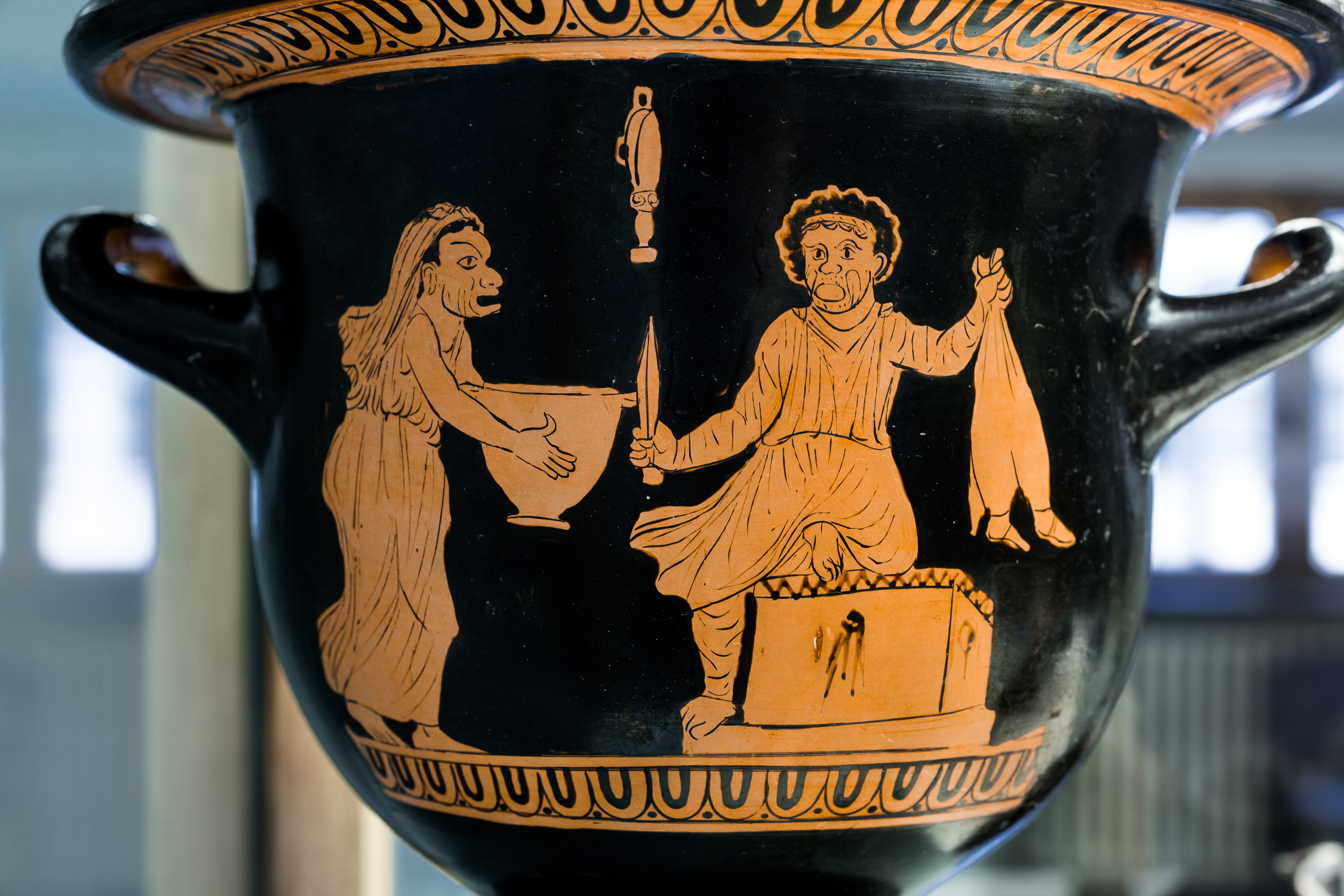
Phlyax scene from Thesmophoriazusae on an Apulian krater, c. 370 BC: Having been exposed, Mnesilochus grabs a baby as a hostage, but finds out it was a disguised wineskin. The 'mother' rushes over with a jar to collect the wine.

== Plot ==
Today the women at the festival
Are going to kill me for insulting them!

This bold statement by Euripides is the absurd premise upon which the whole play depends. The women are incensed by his plays' portrayal of the female sex as mad, murderous, and sexually depraved, and they are using the festival of the Thesmophoria (an annual fertility celebration dedicated to Demeter) as an opportunity to debate a suitable choice of revenge.

Fearful of their powers, Euripides seeks out a fellow tragedian, Agathon, in the hope of persuading him to spy on the women and to be his advocate at the festival – a role that would require him to go disguised as a woman. Agathon is already dressed as a woman, in preparation for a play, but he believes that the women of Athens are jealous of him and he refuses to attend the festival for fear of being discovered. Euripides' aged in-law (never named within the play but recorded in the 'dramatis personae' as Mnesilochus) then offers to go in Agathon's place. Euripides shaves him, dresses him in women's clothes borrowed from Agathon and finally sends him off to the Thesmophorion, the venue of the women's secret rites.

There, the women are discovered behaving like citizens of a democracy, conducting an assembly much as men do, with appointed officials and carefully maintained records and procedures. Top of the agenda for that day is Euripides. Two women – Micca and a myrtle vendor – summarize their grievances against him. According to Micca, Euripides has taught men not to trust women, this has made them more vigilant and that in turn makes it impossible for women to help themselves to the household stores. According to the myrtle vendor, his plays promote atheism and this makes it difficult for her to sell her myrtle wreaths. Mnesilochus then speaks up, declaring that the behaviour of women is in fact far worse than Euripides has represented it. He recites in excruciating detail his own (imaginary) sins as a married woman, including a sexual escapade with a boyfriend in a tryst involving a laurel tree and a statue of Apollo.

The assembly is outraged but order is restored when a female messenger is seen approaching. It turns out to be Cleisthenes, a notoriously effeminate homosexual, represented in this play as the Athenian 'ambassador' for women. He has come with the alarming news that a man disguised as a woman is spying upon them on behalf of Euripides. Suspicion immediately falls upon Mnesilochus, being the only member of the group whom nobody can identify. After they remove his clothes, they discover that he is indeed a man. In a scene that parodies the famous hostage scene from Euripides' Telephus, Mnesilochus grabs Micca's baby and threatens to kill it unless the women release him. After closer inspection, however, Mnesilochus discovers that the 'baby' is in fact a wineskin fitted with booties. Undeterred, he still threatens it with a knife. Micca (a devout tippler) pleads for its release but the assembly will not negotiate with Mnesilochus and he stabs the baby anyway. Micca catches its precious blood in a pan.

At this point, the action pauses briefly for a parabasis. Meanwhile, the male authorities are notified of the illegal presence of a man at a women-only festival. Mnesilochus is subsequently arrested and strapped to a plank by a Scythian archer (Athenian equivalent of a policeman) on the orders of a prytanis. There then follows a series of farcical scenes in which Euripides, in a desperate attempt to rescue Mnesilochus, comes and goes in various disguises, first as Menelaus, a character from his own play Helen – to which Mnesilochus responds by playing out the role of Helen – and then as Perseus, a character from another Euripidean play, Andromeda, in which role he swoops heroically across the stage on a theatrical crane (frequently used by Greek playwrights to allow for a deus ex machina) – to which Mnesilochus responds by acting out the role of Andromeda. Improbably, Euripides impersonates Echo in the same scene as he impersonates Perseus. All these mad schemes fail.

The tragic poet then decides to appear as himself and in this capacity he quickly negotiates a peace with the Chorus of women, securing their co-operation with a promise not to insult them in his future plays. The women decline to help him release Mnesilochus (now a prisoner of the Athenian state) but they do agree not to interfere with plans for his escape. Disguised finally as an old lady and attended by a dancing girl and flute player, Euripides distracts the Scythian archer long enough to set Mnesilochus free. The Scythian attempts to apprehend them before they can get clean away but he is steered in the wrong direction by the Chorus and the comedy ends happily.

== Historical background ==
Old Comedy is a highly topical genre and all Aristophanes' plays were written specifically for their original productions at either the Lenaia or City Dionysia. Significant dates and events that might have impacted on the writing of 'Thesmophoriazusae' (411 BC) would include:

- 425 BC: Aristophanes won first prize at the Lenaia with his third play The Acharnians. In that play, the character Euripides lends the protagonist, Dicaiopolis, some theatrical costumes from his plays. In Thesmophoria, on the other hand, the character Euripides dresses Mnesilochus in a costume borrowed from Agathon.
- 415 BC: Euripides' play Palamedes was produced. It is parodied in Thesmophoria.
- 413 BC: The Athenians and their allies suffered a catastrophic defeat in the Sicilian Expedition, a turning-point in the long-running Peloponnesian War. Among those who died in the Sicilian campaign was Lamachus, satirized in The Acharnians as a maniacal war-monger. In 'Thesmophoriazusae' he is mentioned briefly but with respect as a war hero whose mother deserves to be publicly feted.
- 412 BC: Euripides' plays Helen and Andromeda were produced. Both plays are parodied at length in Thesmophoriazusae.
- 411 BC: Both Thesmophoriazusae and Lysistrata were produced; an oligarchic revolution (one of the consequences of the Sicilian disaster) proved briefly successful and the demagogue Hyperbolus (a frequent target of the earlier plays) was assassinated by oligarchic conspirators in Samos. Hyperbolus receives a brief, derogatory mention in Thesmophoriazusae as someone whose mother does not deserve to share a table with the honoured mother of Lamachus.

Literary traditions and fashions, and the poets identified with them, are subject to comment and parody in all of Aristophanes' plays. In this play, Euripides is the main target. Others:

- Agathon: A contemporary of Aristophanes and a successful tragedian, he is represented in this play as a clownish aesthete who believes that beautiful people write beautifully.
- Phrynicus: A celebrated tragedian of an older generation (early 5th century BC), he is mentioned favourably by Agathon as a beautiful man (kalos) who dressed beautifully and who wrote beautiful plays (kal' dramata).
- Ibycus, Anacreon and Alcaeus: 6th-century BC lyrical poets, mentioned favourably by Agathon as examples of poets who dressed and behaved as effetely as himself.
- Philocles, Xenocles, and Theognis: Dramatic poets and contemporaries of Aristophanes, frequently lampooned in other plays, they receive a derogatory though brief mention here too.

== Discussion ==
The Poet and the Women is notable for its reversal of sexual stereotypes, where men dress as women and the women appear to be the equal of men, particularly in their imitation of the ecclesia or democratic assembly (in fact the herald's opening of the women's assembly with a paean-like cry has been taken as evidence that the ecclesia itself might have begun with a paean). However, tragic and comic poets in classical Athens reinforced sexual stereotyping even when they seemed to demonstrate empathy with the female condition, and women typically were considered to be irrational creatures in need of protection from themselves and from others. Mica's wine-skin baby is a demonstration of the irrational and subversive nature of women but so also is the female assembly – it represents a state within the Athenian state and its assumed jurisdiction over Euripides is in fact illegal.

The sexual role-reversals can be understood to have a broad, political significance. The warrior ethos of an older generation versus the effete intellectualism of a younger generation is a debate or agon that recurs in various forms throughout the plays of Aristophanes. In The Frogs, for example, the agon is between Aeschylus, who values Homer for the warrior ethos he inculcates in his audience, and Euripides who values the intellectual and philosophical quibbling of a legalistic society. The agon in The Frogs is won by Aeschylus and he is brought back from the dead to reform the polis with his instructive poetry. In Thesmophoriazusae the Chorus of women makes the point that they are better than their men because they have preserved their heritage (as represented by the weaving shuttle, the wool-basket and the parasol) whereas the men have lost their spears and shields. The loss of the shield is expressed by the Chorus metaphorically and contemptuously as 'the parasol is thrown away' (erriptai to skiadeion), a reference to the word 'rhipsaspis' (shield-thrower), a derogatory term whose use was considered in Athens to be actionable slander. Thus the message behind the sexual role-reversals in Thesmophoriazusae is not that women are equal to men but rather that the present generation of men is behaving no better than the women (the same message is delivered in Lysistrata). The stupidity of the war with Sparta, the criminal motives behind it and the desire for peace are major themes in Aristophanes' earlier plays. There is almost no mention of The Peloponnesian War in this play yet the peace that Euripides very easily negotiates with the women at the end of the play (after all his combative schemes have failed) could be interpreted as a pro-peace message.

== Thesmophoriazusae and Old Comedy ==
Aristophanes observed the conventions of Old Comedy in his earlier plays and gradually abandoned them in favour of a simpler approach, a trend that was continued by other dramatists until it reached its fulfilment in the New Comedy of Menander. In Thesmophoriazusae, variations from Old Comedy conventions include:

- Parodos: In Old Comedy, the parodos or entry of the Chorus was an important element in the entertainment, accomplished with music, dance and extravagant spectacle. In this play, there are two Choruses – one appears briefly while accompanying Agathon in a song outside his house, and later the Chorus proper enters the stage as the women of the festival. The Women enter quietly, performing devotional tasks in which Mnesilochus, disguised as a woman, participates. This quiet entry is uncharacteristic of a parodos. The doubling of the Chorus is a phenomenon that is repeated in The Frogs, where the Chorus briefly assumes the identity of frogs before it takes on its main role as The Blessed. In Lysistrata, produced at the same time as Thesmophoriazusae, there are also two choruses (Old Men and Old Women) but they appear on stage together after entering separately.
- Parabasis: In a parabasis the Chorus directly addresses the audience. Typically there are two parabases in a play and, during the first, the Chorus speaks out of character, acting as a mouthpiece for the author. In Thesmophoria however the Chorus never speaks out of character, the first parabasis is shortened and there is no second parabasis.
- Agon: A debate or argument between protagonist and antagonist is another important element in Old Comedy. Usually it is conducted in long verses of anapests divided into two symmetrical sections (epirrhema and antepirrhema) and the protagonist is triumphant, as for example in The Knights, The Clouds and The Wasps. In Thesmophoriazusae, there is no such agon. There is a formal debate between Mnesilochus and Mica but it is conducted in shorter lines of ordinary dialogue (iambic trimeter). It has something of the symmetrical structure typical of a conventional agon, with a long speech (by Mica), a long reply (by Mnesilochus) and a pair of symmetrical songs from the Chorus, but a small speech by a third party (the myrtle vendor) is inserted in the middle, along with another song, and this disturbs the symmetry. Unlike a conventional agon, the debate doesn't produce a victor and it is followed by a heated argument in long, iambic verses between Mnesilochus and Mica.
- Concluding episodes: In Old Comedy, dramatic tension is sacrificed quite early in the play with the protagonist's victory in the agon and thereafter the action is simply a celebration or affirmation of that victory in a loose series of farcical episodes in which "unwanted visitors" are driven off. In this play tension is maintained until the very end, when Euripides negotiates a peace and Mnesilochus is released from his bonds, yet the play is still typical of an Old Comedy in its introduction of 'unwanted visitors' in the latter part of the play – here they include Menelaus, Perseus and Echo i.e. Euripides disguised as characters from his own plays. This use of the 'unwanted visitors' convention is anticipated in The Knights, where Paphlagonian (i.e. Cleon) is defeated by the protagonist in a variety of roles.
- Exodos: Old Comedy conventionally ends with a celebration of the protagonist's victory and it features a sexual conquest, as represented for example by the flute girl in The Wasps and the Muse of Euripides in The Frogs. In Thesmophoriazusae, female entertainment is supplied by a dancing girl but it is not the protagonist who wins her favours – that pleasure falls into the lap of the Scythian archer. Euripides and Mnesilochus are too busy making good their escape to have time for a proper exodus (a joke that would not have been lost on the original audience).

== Standard edition (in Greek) ==
The most recent critical edition of the Attic Greek language text of the play (with commentary) is:

- Colin Austin and S. Douglas Olson, Aristophanes Thesmophorizusae (Oxford University Press, 2004) ISBN 978-0-19-955383-9

== Translations ==
- B. B. Rogers: verse: full text
- Arthur S. Way, 1934 – verse
- Eugene O'Neill, Jr, 1938 – prose: full text
- Dudley Fitts, 1959 – prose and verse
- David Barrett, 1964 – prose and verse
- Alan H. Sommerstein, 1994 – prose ISBN 978-0-85668-559-0
- Unknown translator – prose: full text
- Jeffrey Henderson, 2000 – prose ISBN 0-674-99587-2
- George Theodoridis, 2007 – prose: full text

== See also ==
- Codex Ravennas 429
