= The Knights =

Comedy by Aristophanes

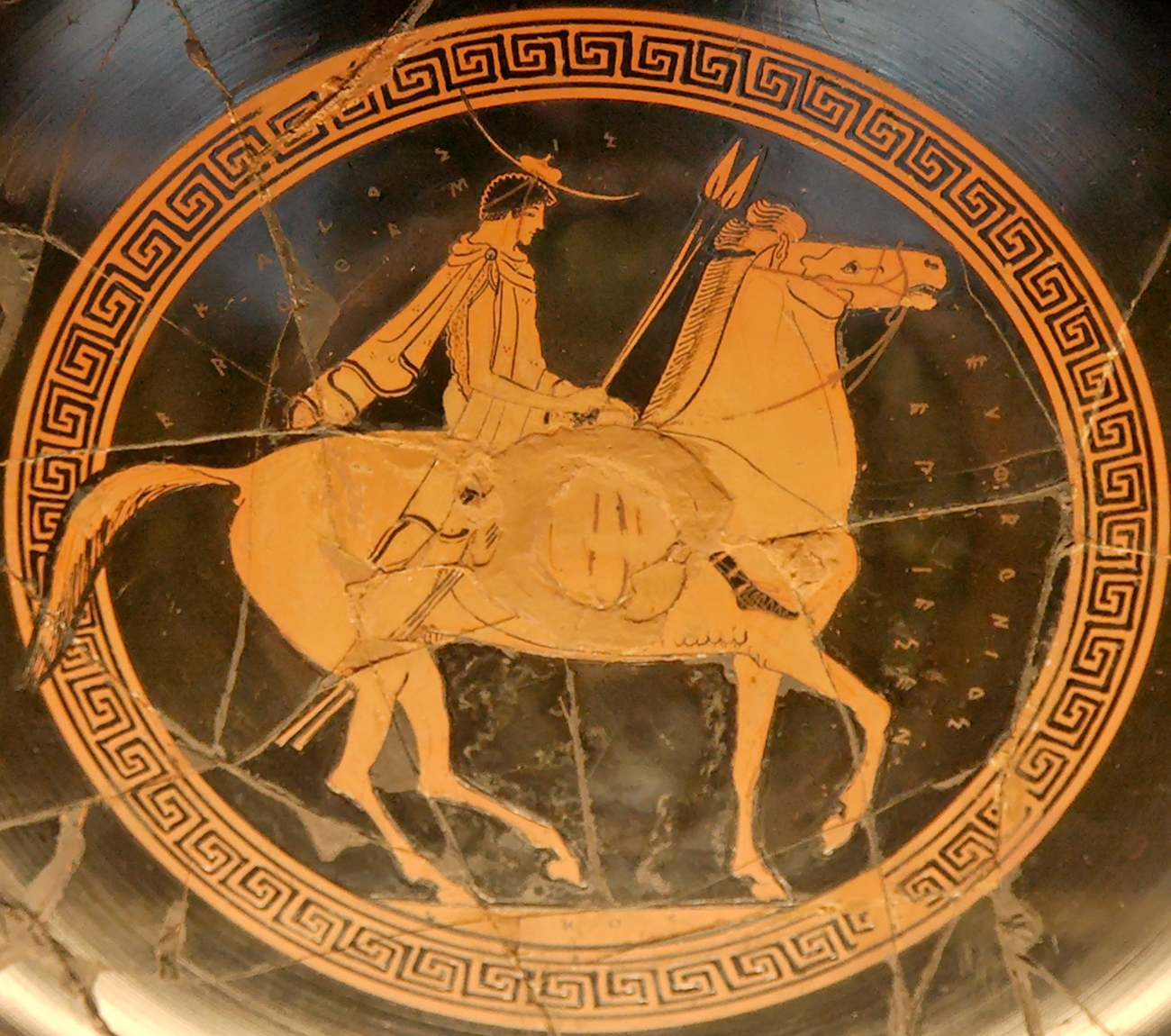
- Knight. The Dramatis Personae in ancient comedy depends on interpretation of textual evidence. This list is based on Alan Sommerstein's translation.
- Written by: Aristophanes
- Chorus: knights
- Characters: Demosthenes a slave of Demos; Nicias another slave of Demos; Agoracritus a sausage seller; Paphlagonian (Cleon) a slave and steward of Demos; Demos an elderly Athenian; Silent roles: The Peacetreaties two girls; Several slaves
- Setting: Outside Demos' house near the Pnyx in Athens

The Knights (Ancient Greek: Ἱππεῖς Hippeîs; Attic: Ἱππῆς) was the fourth play written by Aristophanes, who is considered the master of Old Comedy. The play is a satire on the social and political life of classical Athens during the Peloponnesian War, and in this respect it is typical of all the dramatist's early plays. It is unique, however, in the relatively small number of its characters, and this was due to its vitriolic preoccupation with one man, the pro-war populist Cleon. Cleon had prosecuted Aristophanes for slandering the polis with an earlier play, The Babylonians (426 BC), for which the young dramatist had promised revenge in The Acharnians (425 BC), and it was in The Knights (424 BC) that his revenge was exacted. The Knights won first prize at the Lenaia festival when it was produced in 424 BC.

== Plot ==
The Knights is a satire on political and social life in 5th-century BC Athens. The characters are drawn from real life, and Cleon is clearly intended to be the villain. However, it is also an allegory. The characters are figures of fantasy, and the villain in this context is Paphlagonian, a comic monstrosity responsible for almost everything that's wrong with the world. The identity of the Paphlagonian as Cleon is awkward, and the ambiguities aren't easily resolved. This summary features the real-world names Cleon, Nicias and Demosthenes (though these names are never mentioned in the play). See Discussion for an overview of the ambiguous use of characterization in The Knights.

Short summary: A sausage seller, Agoracritus, vies with Cleon for the confidence and approval of Demos ("The People" in Greek), an elderly man who symbolizes the Athenian citizenry. Agoracritus emerges triumphant from a series of contests, and he restores Demos to his former glory.

Detailed summary: Nicias and Demosthenes run from a house in Athens, complaining of a beating that they have just received from their master Demos, and cursing their fellow slave Cleon as the cause of their troubles. They inform the audience that Cleon has wheedled his way into Demos's confidence, and they accuse him of misusing his privileged position for the purpose of extortion and corruption. They advise us that even the mask-makers are afraid of Cleon and that not one of them could be persuaded to make a caricature of him for this play. They assure us, however, that we are clever enough to recognize him even without a mask. Having no idea how to solve their problems, they pilfer some wine from the house, the taste of which inspires them to an even bolder theft – a set of oracles that Cleon has always refused to let anyone else see. On reading these stolen oracles, they learn that Cleon is one of several peddlers destined to rule the polis and that it is his fate to be replaced by a sausage-seller. As chance would have it, a sausage-seller passes by at that very moment, carrying a portable kitchen. Demosthenes informs him of his destiny. The sausage seller is not convinced at first, but Demosthenes points out the myriads of people in the theatre, and he assures him that his skills with sausages are all that is needed to govern them. Cleon's suspicions, meanwhile, have been aroused, and he rushes from the house in search of trouble. He immediately finds an empty wine bowl, and he loudly accuses the others of treason. Demosthenes calls upon the knights of Athens for assistance, and a Chorus of them charges into the theatre. They converge on Cleon in military formation under instructions from their leader:

Hit him, hit him, hit the villain hateful to the cavalry,
Tax-collecting, all-devouring monster of a lurking thief!
Villain, villain! I repeat it, I repeat it constantly,
With good reason since this thief reiterates his villainy!

Cleon is given rough handling, and the Chorus leader accuses him of manipulating the political and legal system for personal gain. Cleon bellows to the audience for help, and the Chorus urges the sausage-seller to outshout him. There follows a shouting match between Cleon and the sausage-seller with vulgar boasts and vainglorious threats on both sides as each man strives to demonstrate that he is a more shameless and unscrupulous orator than the other. The knights proclaim the sausage-seller the winner of the argument, and Cleon then rushes off to the Boule to denounce them all on a trumped-up charge of treason. The sausage-seller sets off in pursuit, and the action pauses for a parabasis, during which the Chorus steps forward to address the audience on behalf of the author.

The Chorus informs us that Aristophanes has been very methodical and cautious in the way he has approached his career as a comic poet, and we are invited to applaud him. The knights then deliver a speech in praise of the older generation, the men who made Athens great, and this is followed by a speech in praise of horses that performed heroically in a recent amphibious assault on Corinth, whither they are imagined to have rowed in gallant style.

Returning to the stage, the sausage-seller reports to the knights on his battle with Cleon for control of the council: he has outbid Cleon for the support of the councillors with offers of meals at the state's expense. Indignant at his defeat, Cleon rushes onto the stage and challenges the sausage-seller to submit their differences to Demos. The sausage-seller accepts the challenge. They call Demos outdoors and compete with each other in flattering him like rivals for the affections of an eromenos. He agrees to hear them debating their differences, and he takes up his position on the Pnyx (here represented possibly as a bench). The sausage-seller makes some serious accusations in the first half of the debate: (i) Cleon is indifferent to the war-time sufferings of ordinary people, (ii) he has used the war as an opportunity for corruption, and (iii) he prolongs the war out of fear that he will be prosecuted when peace returns. Demos is won over by these arguments, and he spurns Cleon's wheedling appeals for sympathy. Thereafter the sausage-seller's accusations become increasingly absurd: Cleon is accused of waging a campaign against buggery in order to stifle opposition (because all the best orators are buggers), and he is said to have brought down the price of silphium so that jurors who bought it would suffocate each other with their flatulence. Cleon loses the debate, but he doesn't lose hope, and there are two further contests in which he competes with the sausage-seller for Demos's favour: (i) the reading of oracles flattering to Demos; (ii) a race to see which of them can best serve pampered Demos's every need. The sausage-seller wins each contest by outdoing Cleon in shamelessness. Cleon makes one last effort to retain his privileged position in the household: he possesses an oracle that describes his successor, and he questions the sausage-seller to see if he matches the description in all its vulgar details. The sausage-seller does match the description. In tragic dismay, Cleon at last accepts his fate, and he surrenders his authority to the sausage-seller. Demos asks the sausage-seller for his name, and we learn that it is Agoracritus, confirming his lowly origin. The actors depart and the Chorus treats us to another parabasis.

The knights step forward and they advise us that it is honorable to mock dishonorable people. They proceed to mock Ariphrades, an Athenian with a perverse appetite for female secretions. Next they recount an imaginary conversation between some respectable ships that have refused to carry the war to Carthage because the voyage was proposed by Hyperbolus, a man they despise. Then Agoracritus returns to the stage, calling for respectful silence and announcing a new development – he has rejuvenated Demos with a good boiling (just as if he were a piece of meat). The doors of Demos's house open to reveal impressive changes in Demos's appearance – he is now the very image of glorious "violet-crowned" Athens, as once commemorated in a song by Pindar. Agoracritus presents his transformed master with a "well-hung" boy and with the Peacetreaties – two girls that Cleon had been keeping locked up in order to prolong the war. Demos invites Agoracritus to a banquet at the town hall and the entire cast exits in good cheer – all except Cleon, who is required to sell sausages at the city gate as punishment for his crimes.

== Historical background ==
Some significant events leading up to the play:

- 432 BC: The Megarian decree began a trade embargo by Athens against the neighbouring polis of Megara. The Peloponnesian War commenced soon after.
- 430 BC: The Plague of Athens resulted in the deaths of many thousands of Athenians, including leading citizens such as Pericles.
- 427 BC: Aristophanes produced his first play The Banqueters at the City Dionysis. Cleon carried a bill proposing fierce retribution against a rebellious Athenian ally Mytilene, including the execution of all its adult males and the enslavement of all its women and children; the bill was repealed the next day in spite of his opposition. There was a recurrence of the plague at about this time.
- 426 BC: The Babylonians (now lost) won first prize at the City Dionysia. Cleon subsequently prosecuted the young playwright for slandering the polis in the presence of foreigners.
- 425 BC: The Acharnians was produced at the Lenaia. Cleon criticized Athenian generals for procrastination and incompetence and he replaced Nicias in time to assist Demosthenes in the victory at the Battle of Sphacteria. He later increased the tribute payments of allied states and also increased juror's pay from two to three obols per day.
- 424 BC: Aristophanes won first prize at the Lenaia with The Knights

=== Cleon, knights and Aristophanes ===
Cleon's political career was founded on his opposition to the cautious war strategy of Pericles, and its highpoint came with the Athenian victory at Sphacteria, for which he was feted and honored by the majority of his fellow citizens. Included in the civic honors were free meals at the town hall or prytaneion and front row seats at festivals such as the Lenaia and City Dionysia. Cleon's entitlement to these honors is continually mocked by Aristophanes in The Knights, and possibly Cleon was sitting in the front row during the performance. Aristophanes makes numerous accusations against Cleon, many of them comic and some in earnest. He mocks Cleon for his questionable pedigree, but inscriptions indicate that the social origins of demagogues like Cleon were not as obscure as Aristophanes and other comic poets tried to make out. He appears to have used the law courts for personal and political ends, but it is possible that he was neither venal nor corrupt. He had prosecuted Aristophanes for an earlier play, The Babylonians, but an attempt at political censorship during a time of war was not necessarily motivated by personal malice or ambition on Cleon's part. The play depicted the cities of the Athenian League as slaves grinding at a mill, and it had been performed at the City Dionysia in the presence of foreigners. The knights (citizens rich enough to own horses) were the comic poet's natural allies against a populist such as Cleon. According to a passage in The Acharnians, they had recently forced him to hand over a large sum of money, implying that he had obtained it corruptly. As an educated class, knights occupied many of the state offices that were subject to annual audits, and Cleon specialized in the prosecution of such officials, often using his rapport with jurors to obtain the verdicts he wanted. This abuse of the auditing system is one of the complaints made by the Chorus when it enters the stage and it accuses Cleon of selecting officials for prosecution like figs according to their wealth and psychological vulnerability (lines 257–65). The play also accuses Cleon of manipulating census lists to impose crippling financial burdens on his choice of victims (lines 911–25).

=== Other plays in association to The Knights ===
The Knights by Aristophanes is a play known for its satire relating to the rising middle class. This theme shows itself throughout history on multiple occurrences. A notable play with this theme is Molière's play, Le Bourgeois gentilhomme (1670). This Renaissance play has been compared to The Knights due to the satire involving the middle class. Another Renaissance play, The Alchemist by Ben Johnson (1610), is thought to have been influenced by The Knights.

=== Places and people mentioned in The Knights ===
Old Comedy is a highly topical form of comic drama and its meanings are often obscured by multiple references to contemporary news, gossip and literature. Centuries of scholarship have unriddled many of these references and they are explained in commentaries in various editions of the plays. The following lists are compiled from two such sources. Note: Paphlagonian is here referred to by his real name, Cleon.

=== Themes present in The Knights ===
Political corruption: the play makes fun of political corruption through the use of satire. The character Cleon is used to show what Athenians would experience in relation to corrupt political tactics such as bribery, demagoguery, abuse of power, and unjust treatment of the people.

Social inequality: The Knights uses displays of social inequality through its character's roles and dialogue. This theme was most likely implemented due to the Athenian people experiencing social and economic inequality where the rich exploited and marginalized the poor and middle class.

Power and Abuse: This theme shows the theme of power and abuse through the acts of characters rising up and going against the abusive power, and how the common people can fight back against corrupt authority.

Patriotism and War: Since this play takes place during the Peloponnesian War, the play satirizes and criticizes the act of going to war, and how that affects the working class. Aristophanes makes fun of Athens' urge to display military might while ignoring the conditions and consideration of the common people.

Satire: Satire in itself is a large theme throughout The Knights. Aristophanes' use of satire crafts the play in a way where criticism of Athenian life is present and sends a message, as well as calling out who and what he dislikes. He writes The Knights in a way that exposes the failures of effort and shortcomings of the Athenian society and its rulers.

Places

- Pylos: A bay in the Peloponnese, shut in by the island of Sphacteria, it is associated with Cleon's famous victory and there are many references to it in the play: as a cake that Cleon pinched from Demosthenes (lines 57, 355, 1167); as a place where Cleon like a colossus has got one foot (76); as an oath by which Cleon swears (702); as the place where Cleon snatched victory from the Athenian generals (742); as the origin of captured Spartan shields (846); as an epithet of the goddess Athena (1172); and as an equivalent of the hare that Agoracritus stole from Cleon (1201). Pylos is mentioned again in three later plays.
- Paphlagonia: A region in modern Turkey, it is imputed to be the birthplace of Cleon since he is named after it. There is a pun on the word paphlazo (I bubble, splutter, fret) which is made explicit in reference to Cleon in line 919.
- Chaonia: A region in the northwestern Greece, it is where Cleon the colossus dangles his arse (line 78) and it is also mentioned in The Acharnians. One of his hands is in Aetolia (79).
- Cycloborus: A mountain torrent in Attica, it is the image of Cleon's voice here (line 137) and also in The Acharnians.
- Carthage or Carchedon: A Phoenician city, it marks a western limit of Athenian influence (line 174) and it is somewhere that the ships don't want to go (1303); an eastern limit is marked by Caria (173).
- Chalcidice: A region in the northern Aegean that was under Athenian control but where the cities were increasingly rebellious. The wine bowl that the two slaves steal from the house is Chalcidian in design and Cleon subsequently accuses them of stealing it to provoke a Chalcidian revolt (line 237). Ironically, Cleon later perished in a military campaign to quell the revolt there.
- Chersonesos: The Gallipoli Peninsula, it is mentioned by the Chorus as the sort of place where Cleon fishes for people he can put on trial in Athens (line 262)
- Prytaneion: The ancient equivalent of a town hall, it is where Cleon obtains free meals (lines 281, 535, 766) and where Agoracritus is destined to obtain free sex (167).
- Pergase: A deme of the Erechthides tribe, not far outside Athens, it was as far as Demosthenes got when a pair of leather shoes that Cleon had sold him began to dissolve (line 321)
- Miletus: One of the principal cities of Ionia, it is famous for its fish (line 361). Cleon is imagined choking on a fried cuttlefish while contemplating a bribe from Miletus (932).
- Potidaea: A rebellious city in Chalcidice, it was recaptured by the Athenians in 429 BC. Cleon offers Agoracritus a bribe of one talent not to mention the bribe of ten talents he is said to have taken from there (line 438).
- Boeotia: A northern neighbour of the Athenians but an ally of Sparta, it was famous for its cheeses. Cleon accuses Agoracritus of making cheese with the Boeotians (line 479). Boeotia is mentioned extensively in The Acharnians and receives other mentions in two other plays.
- Argos: A Peloponnesian state, it had remained neutral throughout the war. Agoracritus claims that Cleon used negotiations with Argos as an opportunity to negotiate a bribe from the Spartans (line 465) and he murders a quote from Euripides in which the ancient state is apostrophized (813). Argos is mentioned in four other plays.
- Sunium and Geraestus: The sites of two temples of Poseidon (southern tips of Attica and Euboea), they are mentioned in an invocation to the god as a defender of the polis (lines 560–1). Sunium is mentioned again in The Clouds.
- Corinth: A Peloponnesian state, it had recently been attacked by marines under the command of Nicias. The cavalry had played a decisive role in the expedition. The horses had even rowed the ships and their attitude had been meritorious throughout the campaign (line 604). Corinth is mentioned again in two later plays.
- Pnyx: The hill where Athenian citizens assembled to debate state issues, it is said by Agoracritus to have a bad effect on Demos – ordinarily the cleverest chap in the world, he often gapes at the speaker's platform like someone tying wild figs to a cultivar (line 749–55).
- Kerameikos: The potter's quarter and town cemetery – Agoracritus offers to be dragged through it by a meathook in his balls as an assurance of his love for Demos (line 772)
- Marathon: Here as elsewhere, it is a name that conjures up patriotic pride and respect for the old ways (lines 781, 1334).
- Salamis: Another name to conjure with, Demos acquired a sore bum there while rowing in the Battle of Salamis (which means he must be very old), in gratitude for which Agoracritus thoughtfully provides him with a cushion (line 785). The island is mentioned again in Lysistrata.
- Arcadia: Ordinarily a wild backwoods in the very heart of enemy territory, it is where Demos will sit in judgement for five obols a day, according to one of Cleon's oracles (line 798).
- Peiraeus: The main Athenian port, it was plastered onto the Athenian pie by Themistocles (line 815), and it has become his epithet (885). It is mentioned again in Peace.
- Coprus or Kopros: A deme of the tribe Hippothoontides, it also means feces. A man from there told Demos about Cleon's plot to murder jurors en masse by inducing flatulence (line 899).
- Cyllene: A Peloponnesian harbour, it is also a pun for kylle (beggar's hand). Apollo warns Demos in an oracle to avoid it and it is suggested that the hand belongs to a religious fanatic and oracle monger, Diopeithes (lines 1081–85).
- Ecbatana: The seat of the Persian kings, it is foretold in an oracle to be another place where Demos will someday sit in judgement (line 1089). Ecbatana is mentioned again in two other plays.
- Theseion: A temple and a safe refuge for fugitives, it is where the ships of the Athenian fleet consider fleeing to escape Hyperbolus (even though it is inland). A shrine of the Eumenides is considered in the same light (line 1312).

Athenian politicians and generals

- Cleon, Nicias and Demosthenes: See Discussion
- Themistocles: The visionary leader of Athens during the Persian wars, he is mentioned as a role-model for suicide (line 84), as a laughable benchmark for Cleon's own greatness (812–19) and as somebody who never gave Demos a cloak (884).
- Simon and Panaetius: Cavalry officers, they are imagined to be part of the Chorus. Demosthenes directs them in the knights' manoeuvres against Cleon during the parodos – a further clue that he represents the general (lines 242–43).
- Eucrates: A hemp-seller, he is one of a series of populist leaders mentioned in Cleon's oracles (line 129), he is said to have hidden in a pile of bran (254).
- Pericles: Among the most famous of Athenian leaders, he was blamed in The Acharnians for starting the Peloponnesian War but he receives some faint praise here as somebody who never stole food from the prytaneion – unlike Cleon (line283). He is mentioned again in two more plays.
- Archeptolemus (son of Hippodamus): An influential figure among Cleon's opponents, he is said to weep at Cleon's shamelessness (line 327) and he is said to have participated in peace negotiation that were subsequently frustrated by Cleon (794). Thirteen years after this play, he became an influential figure in the oligarchic revolt of 411 BC.
- Alcmaeonids: A powerful aristocratic clan, it was believed to be under a curse for sacrilegious murders committed in the 7th century. Cleon alludes to it as the sinful race from which Agoracritus sprang (line 445).
- Phormio: An admiral who had secured Athenian control of the sea early in the war, he probably died just before The Knights was produced and he is mentioned here in a hymn to Poseidon (line 562). He is mentioned in two other plays.
- Theorus: He is quoted quoting a Corinthian crab's complaint against Athenian horses (line 608). It is not known if this is the same Theorus that Aristophanes mocks elsewhere as an associate of Cleon.
- Hyperbolus: An associate of Cleon often ridiculed in other plays, he is alluded to here as one of the lampsellers who buy the affections of Demos (line 739) and he is despised by ships(1304, 1363).
- Lysicles: A leading politician killed on active service at about the time that Pericles died, he is the sheep-seller mentioned in an oracle as one of a series of Athenian leaders (line 132) and he is a benchmark against which Cleon compares himself (765).
- Phanus: Another associate of Cleon, he is mentioned here as his secretary in the law courts (line 1256). He receives another mention in The Wasps.
- Phaeax: A rising star in the political firmament, his abilities are said by Demos to be admired by effete dandies (line 1377).

Poets and other artists

- Euripides: One of the great tragic poets, he is the butt of jokes in many of Aristophanes plays and he even appears as a character in three of them (The Acharnians, Thesmophoriazusae and The Frogs). He is mentioned here as a model of linguistic artfulness (line 18) and there is an allusion to his mother as a reputed vegetable seller (19). There are quotes from his plays Hippolytus (16), Bellerophon (1249) and Alcestis (1252), as well as a pair of mismatched sayings taken from his works (813).
- Cratinus: A comic poet of the previous generation, he was still writing plays with some success. The Chorus would rather be his bedcover than be friends with Cleon (400) it laments his sad decline as an ageing poet with a drinking problem and it quotes from some of his old songs (526–36). In the following year (423 BC) he won first prize with The Bottle – a satire on his drinking problem – which was the same year Aristophanes came third and last with The Clouds.
- Morsimus: A tragic poet, he is mentioned with disgust by Aristophanes in other plays. The Chorus would rather sing in one of his tragedies than be friends with Cleon (line 401).
- Simonides: An eminent lyrical poet, he is quoted from an ode celebrating a victory in a chariot race (line 406).
- Magnes: Another comic poet, his predicament as a has-been is lamented by the Chorus and there are allusions to five of his plays – The Lute, The Lydians, The Birds, The Flies, The Frogs (lines 520–25)
- Connas: A prizewinning musician from yesteryear, he is said to go about still in his ancient victory chaplets, as thirsty as Cratinus (line 534).
- Crates: Another comic poet of the older generation, his predicament as a has-been is also lamented (line 537).
- Aristophanes: The author explains his cautious approach to his own career and he mentions his own baldness (lines 507–50).
- Ariphrades: Possibly a comic poet, he is later mentioned in The Wasps as one of three sons of Automenes, the other two being a musician and possibly an actor. According to the Chorus of knights, his lewdness is ingenious, his beard is foul with secretions licked up in brothels and he is as vile as Oenichus and Polymnestus (colleagues in smut if not in the arts), yet his musical brother Arignotus is a good man and a friend of the author (1276–89). Ariphrades is mentioned again in Peace and Ecclesiazusae.
- Pindar: A renowned lyrical poet, he is quoted in praise of Athens (lines 1323,1329).

Athenian personalities

- Cleaenetus: The father of Cleon, he is mentioned here as typical of a time when generals never demanded free meals at the prytaneion (line 574).
- Cunna and Salabaccho: Two courtesans, they are considered by Cleon to be great examples of service to Athens (line 765). Cunna is mentioned in two more plays and Salabaccho is mentioned again in Thesmophoriazusae.
- Gryttus: A notorious bugger, his citizenship was revoked by Cleon on moral grounds (line 877).
- Cleonymus: An associate of Cleon and a notorious glutton, he is a frequent target for Aristophanes' satire. Cleon was serving his interests rather than those of Demos (line 58), his appetite exhausts the stores of anyone who entertains him (1294) and he has abused the system to avoid military duties (1372).
- Smicythes: An androgynous name like 'Kim', it identifies a man whose interests are represented by a legal guardian (as if he were a woman) and who is therefore a tempting target for prosecution by Cleon (line 969).
- Philostratus: An infamous brothelkeeper nicknamed 'Dogfox', he is thought by Demos to be the Dogfox that an oracle warns him to avoid – in fact the oracle warns him to avoid Cleon (1069). Philostratus is mentioned again in Lysistrata.
- Lysistratus: A notorious practical-joker and a high-society figure, he is mentioned as somebody who shouldn't be mentioned in a song about horses, on account of his mysterious poverty (1266). He is mentioned in three more plays.
- Thumantis: Another poor man who shouldn't be mentioned in a song about horses (line 1267).
- Cleisthenes: A conspicuously effete Athenian, he is an inexhaustible butt of jokes featuring in many plays, including a silent role in The Acharnians and a short speaking role in Thesmophoriazusae. He is mentioned here as the sort of dandy who is effusive in praise of rhetorical skill and who will be forced to practise more manly pursuits in future (line 1374). A companion, Straton is mentioned in the same capacity. Straton was also a companion of Cleisthenes in The Acharnians and he is mentioned later in The Birds.

Religious, cultural, historic and foreign identities

- Sybil: A mythical prophetess whose oracles were widely circulated in Athens, she is said to be one of Demos' idiotic obsessions (line 61). She is mentioned again in Peace.
- Bakis: Another widely read prophet, his oracles are treasured by Cleon, stolen by Nicias, perused by Demosthenes between gulps of wine (line 123) and later they are read to Demos by Cleon in opposition to the sausage-seller's reading of the oracles of his brother Glanis (104). Bakis is mentioned again in two other plays.
- Pythia: The famous Delphic oracle, she foretells the triumph of the sausage-seller early in the play (line 220) and her words confirm Cleon's defeat at the end of the play (1229, 1273). There is an allusion to her famous saying that Athens would ride the sea like a wine skin and never sink but the receptacle is misrepresented by Cleon as a pan – molgos (963).The oracle and her sanctuary are mentioned in a variety of contexts in other plays.
- Hippias: The tyrant of Athens, whose wife Myrsina is here pronounced Byrsina ('made of leather') because one of their foreign mercenaries is said to be Cleon's father (line 449), who made his fortune trading in leather. Hippias is mentioned again in Lysistrata.
- Medes: An Asiatic people associated with the Persians, they are said by Cleon to be involved in the sausage-seller's conspiratorial comings and goings in the city at night (line 478). They were vanquished by Demos in the good old days (line 781). The Athenian horses recently ate crabs instead of prized Median grass while roughing it as marines in the assault on Corinth (line 606).
- Peplos: Athena's robe, the sacred centrepiece of the festival of the Panathenaea, Athenian men are said by the Chorus to have been worthy of it once (line 566).
- Harmodius A famous tyrannicide and an Athenian hero, he is mentioned here as the sausage-seller's putative ancestor (line 786) and he also receives a mention in three other plays.
- Erechtheus: The mythical king of prehistoric Athens, his name is used as an epithet of Demos during the reading of an oracle (line 1022). Cecrops, another legendary king of Athens, is mentioned in the same vein (1055) and he is named again in three other plays.
- Cerberus: The watchdog of Hades, it is an oracular metaphor for Cleon (line 1030) and it receives a mention in two other plays.
- Antileon: An early tyrant of Chalcis, his name only pops up because Demos, being hard of hearing (line 43), misinterprets an oracle (1044).
- Diopeithes: A notorious religious fanatic and an oracle-monger, he is mentioned in an oracle as a beggar to be avoided (line 1085). His name pops up again two more plays.
- Aristeides: A national hero, he founded the confederacy that became the Athenian empire and he is mentioned with Miltiades, the victorious general at the Battle of Marathon, as examples of Demos' glorious past (line 1325).

== Discussion ==
The play's dual significance as a satire/allegory leads to an ambivalence in its characters that is not easily resolved.

Agoracritus – miracle-worker and/or sausage-seller: The protagonist is an ambiguous character. Within the satirical context, he is a sausage seller who must overcome self-doubts to challenge Cleon as a populist orator, yet he is a godlike, redemptive figure in the allegory. His appearance at the start of the play is not just a coincidence but a godsend (kata theon, line 147), the shameless pranks that enable him to defeat Paphlagonian were suggested to him by the goddess Athena (903), he attributes his victory to Zeus, god of the Greeks (1253), and he compares himself to a god at the end (1338). He demonstrates miraculous powers in his redemption of The People and yet it was done by boiling, a cure for meat practised by a common sausage seller.

Cleon and/or Paphlagonian: The antagonist is another ambiguous character – he represents a real person, Cleon, and a comic monstrosity, Paphlagonian. He is never called 'Cleon' and he doesn't look like Cleon since the maskmakers refused to caricature him. The character, however, is called 'Cleon' in the manuscripts' indications of speakers and in their list of dramatis personae; however, he is simply not ever identified as such in the text itself. Cleon's father, Cleaenetus, is mentioned by name (line 574) but there is no mention of his relationship with Paphlagonian. The name 'Paphlagonian' implies that the antagonist is of foreign descent and he is said to be the grandson of a foreign mercenary employed by the tyrant, Hippias (line 449). However, an oracle refers to Paphlagonian as the watchdog of Athens (Kuon or Dog, line 1023) and Kuon was in fact Cleon's nickname (later exploited in the trial scene in The Wasps). The first half of the debate at the Pnyx (lines 756–835) features some serious accusations that are clearly aimed at Cleon. On the other hand, the second half of the debate (lines 836–940) features absurd accusations that are aimed at an entirely comic villain.

Nicias and Demosthenes and/or two slaves: The two slaves are listed as Demosthenes and Nicias in ancient manuscripts. The lists were probably based on the conjecture of ancient critics and yet there is little doubt that they reflect Aristophanes' intentions. Demosthenes summons the Chorus of knights as if he were a general in command of cavalry. Moreover, he says he made a Spartan cake in Pylos that was later pilfered by Paphlagonian (lines 54–7) and this seems to be a reference to Cleon's success in taking the lion's share of the credit for the victory at Sphacteria. However, the identity slaves=generals is problematic. In the standard edition of the collected plays, the two slaves leave the stage early and they don't return. This is consistent with their role as minor characters and yet Nicias and Demosthenes were not minor figures in Athenian political life. One editor has Demosthenes deliver a short valedictory speech congratulating Agoracritus at the end of the play (lines 1254–56) – a speech that is otherwise assigned to the leader of the Chorus. However this is a token appearance after a long absence and it still leaves the audience in the dark about how Nicias feels at the end.

Imagery: It has been observed that imagery is the most important aspect of Aristophanes' comic poetry. In this play, the imagery provides a context in which the ambiguities mentioned above can be resolved. Paphlagonian is a monstrous giant (74–9), a snoring sorcerer (103), a mountain torrent (137), a hook-footed eagle (197), garlic pickle (199), a mud-stirrer (306), a fisherman watching for shoals of fish (313), a butchered pig (375–81), a bee browsing blooms of corruption (403), a dog-headed ape (416), a storm by sea and land (430–40), a giant hurling crags (626–29), a storm surge at sea (691–93), a thieving nurse (716–18), a fishermen hunting eels (864–67), a boiling pot (919–22), a lion fighting gnats (1037–8), a dogfox (1067), a beggar (182–3) and finally a sausage seller in the city gates (1397). These mixed metaphors present Paphlagonian as a versatile form of comic evil whose relevance transcends any particular place or time. Thus Cleon can be understood as one of Paphlagonian's many manifestations and the satire is subsumed in the larger allegory without contradiction.

Gluttony is one of the dominant themes that emerge from the imagery. The play's focus on food and drink is evident in the choice of a sausage seller as the protagonist. It is evident also in puns on the names of two characters. The name Paphlagonian bears a resemblance with Paphlazo (I splutter, boil, fret) and this pun is made explicit in lines 919–22, where Paphlagonian is imagined as a boiling pot that needs to be taken off the fire. In Greek Demos bears a resemblance to the Greek word for fat, a pun that is made explicit in lines 214–16, where Demosthenes compares the task of government to the task of preparing and cooking meat. The connection Demos=fat is consistent with the notion that Agoracritus can refine his master at the end of the play by boiling him (a notion that originates in the myth of Pelias, whose children boil him like an old ram in an attempt to rejuvenate him). Many of the grossest images in the play feature references to cannibalism: Paphlagonian swallows his victims like figs (258–63), Agoracritus is urged to eat Paphlagonian's crest and wattles (496–7), protagonist and antagonist threaten to devour each other (693, 698–701) and Demos devours his own officials (1131–40). Such images present the audience with a nightmarish vision of the world – it is a world where horses and ships talk and act more like human beings than human beings do. The darkness of this vision makes the final vision of a reformed Athens all the brighter by contrast.

== The Knights and Old Comedy ==
The Knights is one of the earliest of Aristophanes' surviving plays and generally it obeys the conventions of Old Comedy. There are some significant variations in this play:

- Agon: An agon is a symmetrical scene in which a debate is conducted in long lines, typically anapests. In a few cases however anapests are used to indicate arguments that the poet wants to be taken seriously while iambs are used to indicate arguments not to be taken seriously. Examples of this are found in The Clouds (lines 949–1104) and in The Frogs (lines 895–1098). The agon in The Knights is another example. It takes the form of a debate on the Pnyx between Cleon and the sausage-seller. The first half is in anapests and it features serious criticisms of Cleon (lines 756–835) but the second half is in iambs and the criticisms of Cleon are comically absurd (lines 836–940).
- Concluding episodes: It is typical for an agon to result in the protagonist's victory and thereafter the action becomes a farcical anticlimax characterized by the comings and goings of 'unwelcome visitors'. The agon in The Knights results in the conventional victory for the protagonist but the anticlimax involves a highly comic variation – the only unwelcome visitor in this play is Cleon, who will not accept defeat and who thus inflicts upon himself a series of defeats that is conventionally reserved for a series of secondary characters.
- Exodos: Old Comedy mandates a happy ending that culminates in a final song to mark the cast's departure. There is no such song in The Knights and it is possible that it has been lost in the transmission of the ancient manuscripts.

Minor variations include:

- Prologue: Other plays by Aristophanes begin quietly, with characters seated, lying or standing. This play begins with an unusually dramatic entry – two characters run onto the stage howling. The prologue here is otherwise quite conventional.
- Parodos: The Chorus of knights runs into the theatre and immediately skirmishes with Paphlagonian – such a rapid entry into the action is unusual.
- Symmetrical scenes: Old Comedy has many scenes in which two sections resemble each other in meter and length. This play features a symmetrical scene inside another symmetrical scene – one pair of scenes (303–21 and 382–96) features trochaic tetrameter and the other (322–381 and 398–456) features iambic tetrameter.
- Parabasis: It is conventional for the Chorus to address the audience while the actors are offstage and usually there are two such addresses – one in the middle and a second address later in the play. The Knights exemplifies these conventions but it also provides a thematic link between the first and second parabasis. The first parabasis (lines 498–610) features a description of horses that talk and act like good men. The second parabasis (lines 1264–1315) features a description of ships that talk and act like good women. However, it has been suggested, on the basis of ancient commentaries, that the second parabasis was actually written by Eupolis, another comic poet.

== Translations ==
- Benjamin Dann Walsh, 1836 – verse, full text
- John Hookham Frere, 1839 – verse, full text
- William James Hickie, 1853 – prose, full text
- Benjamin B. Rogers, 1924 – verse, full text
- Arthur S. Way, 1934 – verse
- Eugene O'Neill, Jr., 1938 – prose, full English translation with Greek text
- Robert H. Webb, 1962: available for digital loan
- Alan H. Sommerstein, 1978, available for digital loan
- Jeffrey Henderson, 1998 (Loeb Classical Library) – verse
- George Theodoridis, 2008 – prose: full text
- Ian C. Johnston, 2010 – verse: full text
- Mike Lippman & Wilfred E. Major, Men and Their Horses, 2022 - modernized translation emphasizing similarities with Donald Trump's America
