= The Acharnians =

Comedy by Aristophanes

- Sculpture of Bacchus, by Michelangelo
- Written by: Aristophanes
- Chorus: old men of Acharnae
- Characters: The Dramatis Personae in ancient comedy depends on interpretation of textual evidence. This list is based on Alan Sommerstein's translation.: Dikaiopolis; Crier; Amphitheus an immortal; Ambassador lately returned from Persian court; Pseudartabas The Great King's Eye; Theorus ambassador to Thrace; Daughter to Dikaiopolis; Cephisophon Euripides' leading actor; Euripides the tragic poet; Lamachus the general; A Megarian; Two daughters to the Megarian; Informer; A Boeotian; Nicarchus another informer; A servant of Lamachus; Farmer; Best Man; Two messengers; Silent Roles: Reconciliation divine woman; The Executive Committee or Prytanis; Scythian Policeman; Second ambassador; Two 'eunuchs'; Odomantian soldiers; Wife to Dikaiopolis; Boeotian pipe band; Eel; Bridesmaid; Two dancing girls; The Archon basileus; Citizens, slaves, revellers, Lamachus' friends etc.
- Setting: 1.Pnyx at Athens; 2.Street outside the houses of Dikaiopolis, Euripides and Lamachus

The Acharnians or Acharnians (Ancient Greek: Ἀχαρνεῖς Akharneîs; Attic: Ἀχαρνῆς) is the third play — and the earliest of the eleven surviving plays — by the Athenian playwright Aristophanes. It was produced in 425 BC on behalf of the young dramatist by an associate, Callistratus, and it won first place at the Lenaia festival.

The Acharnians is about an Athenian citizen, Dikaiopolis, who miraculously obtains a private peace treaty with the Spartans and enjoys the benefits of peace in spite of opposition from some of his fellow Athenians. The play is notable for its absurd humour, its imaginative appeal for an end to the Peloponnesian War, and for the author's spirited response to condemnations of his previous play, The Babylonians, by politicians such as Cleon, who had reviled it as a slander against the Athenian polis. In The Acharnians, Aristophanes reveals his resolve not to yield to attempts at political intimidation.

Along with the other surviving plays of Aristophanes, The Acharnians is one of the few – and oldest – surviving examples of a highly satirical genre of drama known as Old Comedy.

== Plot ==
The play begins with Dikaiopolis sitting all alone on the Pnyx (the hill where the Athenian Assembly or ecclesia regularly meets to discuss matters of state). He is middle-aged, he looks bored and frustrated and soon he begins to vent his thoughts and feelings to the audience. He reveals his weariness with the Peloponnesian War, his longing to go home to his village, his impatience with the ecclesia for its failure to start on time and his resolve to heckle speakers who won't debate an end to the war. Soon some citizens do arrive, all pushing and shoving to get the best seats, and then the day's business begins.

A series of important speakers addresses the assembly but the subject is not peace and, true to his earlier promise, Dikaiopolis comments loudly on their appearance and probable motives. First of all there is the ambassador who has returned from the Persian court after many years, complaining of the lavish hospitality he has had to endure from his Persian hosts; then there is the Persian grandee, The Eye of the Great King, Pseudartabas, sporting a gigantic eye and mumbling gibberish, accompanied by some eunuchs who turn out to be a disreputable pair of effete Athenians in disguise; next is the ambassador recently returned from Thrace, blaming the icy conditions in the north for his long stay there at the public's expense; and lastly there is the rabble of Odomantians who are presented as elite mercenaries willing to fight for Athens but who hungrily steal the protagonist's lunch. Peace is not discussed. It is in the ecclesia, however, that Dikaiopolis meets Amphitheus, a man who claims to be the immortal great-great-grandson of Triptolemus and Demeter and who claims, moreover, that he can obtain peace with the Spartans privately. Dikaiopolis accepts his claims, and he pays him eight drachmas to bring him a private peace, which in fact Amphitheus manages to do.

Dikaiopolis celebrates his private peace with a private celebration of the Rural Dionysia, beginning with a small parade outside his own house. He and his household, however, are immediately set upon by a mob of aged farmers and charcoal burners from Acharnae – tough veterans of past wars who hate the Spartans for destroying their farms and who hate anyone who talks peace. They are not amenable to rational argument, so Dikaiopolis grabs a hostage and a sword and demands the old men leave him alone. The hostage is a basket of Acharnian charcoal, but the old men have a sentimental spot for anything from Acharnia (or maybe they are simply caught up in the drama of the moment), and they agree to leave Dikaiopolis in peace if only he will spare the charcoal. The importance of both the charcoal and the tool that Dikaiopolis holds hostage is that one of the primary sources of revenue for that region was the manufacturing and selling of charcoal. This is further justification for the dissenters' exaggerated response. He surrenders the hostage, but he now wants more than just to be left alone in peace: he desperately wants the old men to believe in the justice of his cause. He even says that he is willing to speak with his head on a chopping block, if only they will hear him out, and yet he knows how unpredictable his fellow citizens can be: he says he hasn't forgotten how Cleon dragged him into court over "last year's play."

This mention of trouble with Cleon over a play indicates that Dikaiopolis represents Aristophanes (or possibly his producer, Callistratus), and maybe the author is in fact the actor behind the mask. After gaining the chorus's permission for an anti-war speech, Dikaiopolis/Aristophanes decides he needs some special help with it, and he goes next door to the house of Euripides, an author renowned for his clever arguments. As it turns out, however, he merely goes there to borrow a costume from one of his tragedies, Telephus, in which the hero disguises himself as a beggar. Thus attired as a tragic hero disguised as a beggar, and with his head on the chopping block, Dikaiopolis/Telephus/the beggar/Aristophanes explains to the Chorus his reasons for opposing the war. The war all started, he argues, because of the abduction of three courtesans, and it is continued by profiteers for personal gain. Half the Chorus is won over by this argument, the other half isn't.

A fight breaks out between Acharnians for and Acharnians against Dikaiopolis/Telephus/the beggar/Aristophanes, and it only ends when the Athenian general Lamachus (who also happens to live next door) emerges from his house and imposes himself vaingloriously on the fray. Order is restored, and the general is then questioned by the hero about the reason why he personally supports the war against Sparta. Is it out of his sense of duty, or because he gets paid? This time the whole Chorus is won over by the arguments of Dikaiopolis. Dikaiopolis and Lamachus retire to their separate houses, and there then follows a parabasis in which the Chorus first lavishes exaggerated praise upon the author and next laments the ill treatment that old men like themselves suffer at the hands of slick lawyers in these fast times.

Dikaiopolis returns to the stage and sets up a private market where he and the enemies of Athens can trade peacefully. Various minor characters come and go in farcical circumstances. A starving Megarian trades his famished daughters, disguised as piglets, for garlic and salt (products in which Megara had abounded in pre-war days). Then an informer or sycophant tries to confiscate the piglets as enemy contraband before he is driven off by Dikaiopolis. (Note that piglets meant also female genitals). Next, a Boeotian arrives with birds and eels for sale. Dikaiopolis has nothing to trade that the Boeotian could want, but he cleverly manages to interest him in a commodity that is rare in Boeotia – an Athenian sycophant. Another sycophant happens to arrive at that very moment, and he tries to confiscate the birds and eels, but instead he is packed in straw like a piece of pottery and carried off back home by the Boeotian.

Some other visitors come and go before two heralds arrive, one calling Lamachus to war, the other calling Dikaiopolis to a dinner party. The two men go as summoned and return soon after: Lamachus, in pain from injuries sustained in battle and with a soldier at each arm propping him up; Dikaiopolis, merrily drunk and with a dancing girl on each arm. Dikaiopolis clamors cheerfully for a wine skin – a prize awarded to him in a drinking competition – and then everyone exits in general celebrations (except Lamachus, who exits in pain).

== Historical background ==
The Peloponnesian War was already into its sixth year when The Acharnians was produced. The Spartans and their allies had been invading Attica every year, burning, looting and vandalizing farm property with unusual ferocity in order to provoke the Athenians into a land battle that they couldn't win. The Athenians always remained behind their city walls until the enemy returned home, whereupon they would march out to wreak revenge on their pro-Spartan neighbours – Megara in particular. It was a war of attrition, it had already resulted in daily privations, in starvation and plague, and yet democratic Athens continued to be guided by the pro-war faction led by Cleon and exemplified by tough-minded militarists such as Lamachus. Meanwhile, Aristophanes had been engaged in a personal yet very public battle with Cleon. His earlier play, The Babylonians, had depicted the cities of the Athenian League as slaves grinding at a mill and it had been performed at the City Dionysia in the presence of foreigners. Cleon had subsequently prosecuted him for slandering the polis — or possibly the producer, Callistratus, was prosecuted instead. Aristophanes was already planning his revenge when The Acharnians was produced and it includes hints that he would carve Cleon up in his next play, The Knights.

Some significant events leading up to the play:

- 432 BC: The Megarian decree began a trade embargo by Athens against the neighbouring polis of Megara. The Peloponnesian War commenced soon after.
- 430 BC: The Plague of Athens resulted in the deaths of many thousands of Athenians, including leading citizens such as Pericles.
- 427 BC: The Banqueters, the first play by Aristophanes, was produced. There was a recurrence of the plague at about the same time.
- 426 BC: The Babylonians won first prize at the City Dionysia. Cleon subsequently prosecuted the young playwright for slandering the polis in the presence of foreigners.
- 425 BC: The Acharnians was produced at the Lenaia.

Old Comedy was a highly topical form of drama and the audience was expected to be familiar with the various people named or alluded to in the play. Here is a short, selective list of identities named in the play:

- Pericles: The former populist leader of Athens, he is blamed here for starting the Peloponnesian War through his implementation of the Megarian Decree. Pericles had died four years before, in the great plague that afflicted Athens as the city was being besieged by the Spartans.
- Aspasia: The mistress of Pericles and (reputedly) a brothel owner, she is implicated in the blame for starting the war.
- Thucydides (politician): The leader of the opposition to Pericles, he is mentioned here as the victim of an unfair trial motivated by Cleon. The same trial is also mentioned later in The Wasps. This is Thucydides the son of Milesias, head of the aristocratic party; not the historian Thucydides son of Olorus.
- Lamachus: A general, a fervent advocate of the war against Sparta, he is mocked throughout this play as a rabid militarist. He is mentioned also in later plays.
- Cleon: The populist leader of the pro-war faction and a frequent target in later plays, he is mentioned here in connection with four issues – 1. some political or financial loss he had suffered as a result of opposition from the class of knights (hippeis); 2. his prosecution of Thucydides (in which context he is named only by his deme) 3. his imputed foreign lineage; 4. his prosecution of the author over the previous play.
- Euthymenes: The archon eponymous for the year 437/6 BC, he is mentioned here as a means of dating the departure of the ambassador to Persia.
- Cleonymus: A supporter of Cleon, he is immortalised in later plays as the coward who threw away his shield at the Battle of Delium in 424 BC (soon after The Acharnians was produced). He is mentioned here only in relation to his gluttony.
- Hyperbolus: Another populist, he is mentioned here by The Chorus as a litigious individual best avoided but often encountered in the agora. He is frequently mentioned in later plays:
- Theorus: A supporter of Cleon, he appears here as the unreliable ambassador to Thrace. He is mentioned again in later plays.
- Euathlos: A supporter of Cleon, he was involved in the prosecution of Thucydides. He is mentioned later in The Wasps.
- Pittalus: A prominent doctor in Athens, he is twice mentioned in this play in relation to medical treatment for injuries. He receives another mention in the later play The Wasps.
- Aeschylus: The famous tragic poet, he is briefly represented here as someone whose work is generally understood to be admirable. He is mentioned also in later plays.
- Euripides: The famous tragic poet, whose mythical heroes often appear on stage in shabby dress, he is a frequent target in later plays and he appears here as a magniloquent hoarder of disreputable costumes.
- Herodotus: The historian, who had been a recent visitor to Athens (where he gave readings of his history), he is not named but his work is satirized in the play (see the next section).
- Cephisophon: A leading actor of his time, rumoured to have cuckolded Euripides and to have helped in the writing of some of his plays, he appears here as the tragedian's servant. He is mentioned again in The Frogs .
- Theognis: A minor tragic poet, he receives two brief, unfavourable mentions here. He is mentioned again later in another play.
- Antimachus: A choregus, he is the subject of an elaborate curse by the Chorus as punishment for vile behaviour.
- Cleisthenes: A notoriously effete homosexual, often mentioned in later plays, he appears here disguised as a eunuch and represented as the son of Sibyrtius, a famous athletic trainer – an unlikely association.
- Straton: Another effete individual, he appears here alongside Cleisthenes another eunuch.
- Morychus: A notorious gourmand and possibly a tragic poet, he is mentioned here as a lover of eels. He is mentioned again in two later plays.
- Ctesiphon: A notoriously fat Athenian, he provides a convenient gauge for measuring large volumes.
- Lysistratus: A masochist, a member of high society and a practical joker, he is one of the people best avoided in the agora. He is mentioned again in later plays.
- Pauson: A starving painter, he is yet another person to avoid in the agora. He receives other mentions in later plays.
- Hieronymus: A poet, he is best known for his long hair.
- Cratinus (not the comic dramatist): An obscure lyric poet, he is twice mentioned here – as another body best avoided in the agora and as the subject of a humorous curse.
- Coesyra: A rich woman, she is mentioned with Lamachus as the sort of person who manages to get out of Athens when times are awkward. She is mentioned later in The Clouds.
- Phaÿllus: The famous athlete of an earlier generation, he is casually mentioned here as the yardstick for youthful athleticism (the base of a monument to him can still be found on the Acropolis). He is mentioned later in The Wasps.
- Chairis: A Theban piper, twice mentioned here as a source of shrill noise. He is mentioned also in two other plays.
- Moschus and Dechitheus: Musicians.
- Sitalces: A Thracian king and an ally of Athens, he is here said to record his love for Athens in graffiti.
- Diocles: A Megarian hero, he is mentioned here casually in an oath.
- Simaetha: A Megarian prostitute, her abduction by some Athenian revelers is said in this play to be one of the causes of the Peloponnesian War.

== Discussion ==
The Peloponnesian War and Aristophanes' personal battle with the pro-war populist, Cleon, are the two most important issues that underlie the play.

=== Athens at war ===
The Spartans were the dominant military power on the Greek mainland, and consequently Athenians were reluctant to venture on foot far from the safety of their own city walls. Most Athenians had lived in rural settlements up until then. The Acharnians reflects this reluctant transition from rural to urban life. While sitting on the Pnyx, Dikaiopolis gazes longingly at the countryside and expresses his wish to return to his village. Similarly, the old Acharnians sing lovingly of their farms, they express hatred of the enemy for destroying their vines, and they regard the Athenian agora as a place crowded with people that are best avoided. Athens was the dominant maritime power in the Mediterranean however and its citizens could travel by sea with relative ease. Thus, the ambassadors who return from Persia and Thrace are resented by Dikaiopolis because he has been living roughly as a sentry on the battlements while they have been enjoying themselves abroad. Privileged individuals such as Lamachas and Coesura are able to get out of Athens when times become difficult, and in this they are likened to slops that are emptied from an urban household. Thus, the real enemies are not the Megarian and Boeotian farmers, with whom Dikaiopolis is happy to trade, nor even the Spartans, who were simply acting to protect their Megarian allies. Instead, the real enemies are the "wicked little men of a counterfeit kind" who have forced Dikaiopolis into an overcrowded urban existence.

The causes of the war are explained by Dikaiopolis in a manner that is partly comic and partly serious. His criticisms of Pericles and The Megarian Decree appear to be genuine, but he seems to be satirizing the historian Herodotus when he blames the war on the kidnapping of three prostitutes (Herodotus cites the kidnappings of Io, Europa, Medea and Helen as the cause of hostilities between Greeks and Asiatics). The Acharnians in fact features two passages that allude to the work of Herodotus: Dikaiopolis' account of the kidnapping of three women, and the Athenian ambassador's account of his travels in Persia.

=== Aristophanes versus Cleon ===
Aristophanes, or his producer Callistratus, was prosecuted by Cleon for slandering the polis with his previous play, The Babylonians. That play had been produced for the City Dionysia, a festival held early in spring when the seas were navigable and the city was crowded with foreigners. The audience of The Acharnians however is reminded that this particular play has been produced for the Lenaia, a winter festival which few foreigners attend. The author moreover assures us that the real target of this play is not the polis but rather "wicked little men of a counterfeit kind". These scruples are enunciated by Dikaiopolis as if he were the author or producer. He subsequently presents the anti-war argument with his head on a chopping block, a humorous reference to the danger that the satirist puts himself in when he impugns the motives of influential men like Cleon.

== The Acharnians and Old Comedy ==
Like other plays by Aristophanes, The Acharnians generally obeys the conventions of Old Comedy. The following dramatic elements contain variations from convention:

- Agon: Agons have a predictable poetic structure, with speeches in long lines of anapests framed within a pair of symmetrical songs (strophe and antistrophe). There is no such agon in this play. There is a heated argument between the protagonist and the Chorus in couplets of long trochaic verses framed by a strophe and antistrophe (303–334) but the main arguments for and against war are conducted in ordinary dialogue of iambic trimeter, including input from Lamachus as the antagonist.
- Parabasis: Here the first parabasis follows a conventional form (lines 626–701). However, the second parabasis (lines 971-99) is unusual. It can be interpreted as a conventional symmetrical scene and yet it seems to be a hybrid parabasis/song without any clear distinction between the sung and declaimed sections. Moreover, the Chorus in those lines seems to comment on action that occurs on stage during its address to the audience and this is unusual for a parabasis. A later passage (lines 1143–73) begins with a valediction to the actors, which typically clears the stage for a parabasis and yet it has the form of a conventional song rather than a parabasis.

Other points of interest:

- A one-man parabasis: Dikaiopolis speaks about being prosecuted over 'last years' play as if he were the author himself.
- Self-mockery: Old Comedy is a highly topical form of satire directed at people known to the original audience. In this play, the author himself becomes a major target for the play's mock-heroic humour. He explicitly identifies himself with the protagonist Dikaiopolis and thus he also identifies himself with Telephus, a wounded hero who seeks help disguised as a beggar. It is in these combined roles that he adopts the voice of Herodotus, whose mythological/historical accounts of rape and counter-rape as the cause of war were considered hilarious by contemporaries. In the parabasis proper, the Chorus praises the poet as the saviour of Athens. These jokes at his own expense are best understood in the context of his real-life quarrel with Cleon to whom he remains defiant in spite of his self-mockery.
- Possible interpolated lines: Lamachus is another victim of the play's humour but one of the jokes appears not to be by the author. There are eight lines (1181–88) that some editors omit from their translations of the play in which Lamachus is described melodramatically commenting on his own death in a ditch. Lamachus died in the Sicilian Expedition when caught by the enemy on the wrong side of a ditch, many years after the play was produced.

== Standard edition ==
The standard scholarly edition of the play is S. Douglas Olson (ed.), Aristophanes: Acharnians (Oxford University Press, 2002).

== Performances ==
- 1886 May 14: Philadelphia, Academy of Music, in the original Greek, by students of the University of Pennsylvania, before an august assembly of classical scholars. Reported by The New York Times (archive).

== Translations ==
- John Hookham Frere, 1839 – verse: full text (wikisource)
- William James Hickie, 1853 – prose, full text
- Charles James Billson, 1882 – verse: full text
- Robert Yelverton Tyrrell, 1883 – verse: full text
- Benjamin B. Rogers, 1924 – verse: available for digital loan
- Arthur S. Way, 1927 – verse
- Lionel Casson, 1960 – prose and verse
- Douglass Parker, 1962 – verse
- Alan H. Sommerstein, 1973 – prose and verse, available for digital loan
- George Theodoridis, 2004 – prose: full text
- Paul Roche, 2005 – verse
- unknown translator – prose: full text (website classics.mit.edu)
