= Lysistrata =

Comedy by Aristophanes

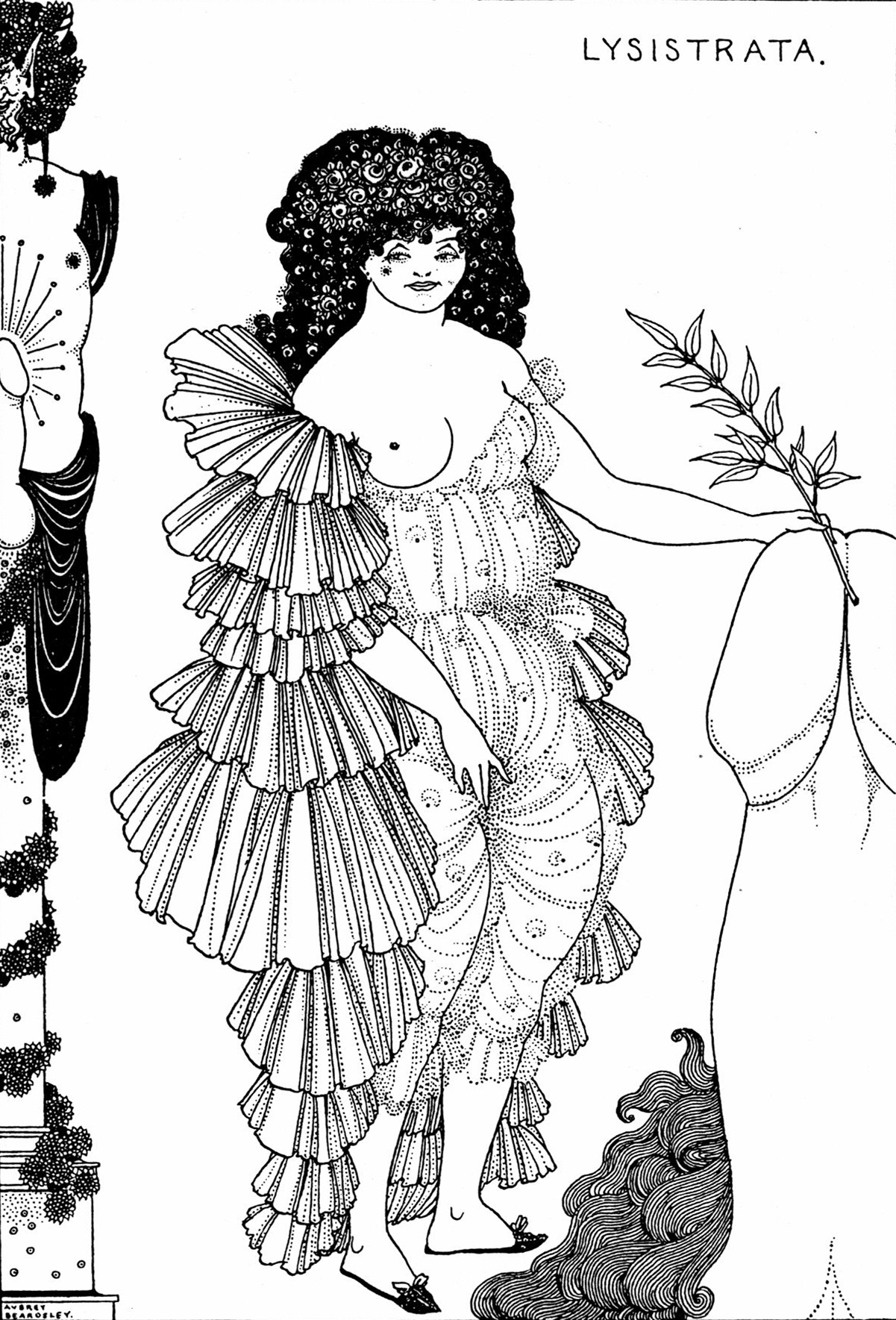
- Illustration by Aubrey Beardsley, 1896 Dramatis Personae in ancient comedy depend on scholars' interpretation of textual evidence. This list is based on Alan Sommerstein's 1973 translation.
- Written by: Aristophanes
- Chorus: Old men; Old women
- Characters: Lysistrata; Calonice; Myrrhine; Lampito; Magistrate; Cinesias; Baby; Spartan Herald; Spartan Ambassador; Athenian Negotiator; Athenian Delegates; Two Layabouts; Doorkeeper; Two Diners; Stratyllis; Five Young Women
- Mute: Ismenia; Corinthian Woman; Reconciliation; Four Scythian Policemen; Scythian Policewoman; Athenian citizens, Spartan envoys, slaves et al.
- Setting: Before the Propylaea, or gateway to the Acropolis of Athens, 411 BC

Lysistrata (/laɪˈsɪstrətə/ or /ˌlɪsəˈstrɑːtə/; Attic Greek: Λυσιστράτη, Lysistrátē, lit. 'army disbander') is an ancient Greek comedy by Aristophanes, first staged in early 411 BCE at Lenaea festival in classical Athens. The play is a comic account of a woman's – Lysistrata's – mission to end the Peloponnesian War between Greek city states by denying sex to all the men of the warring parties and occupying the Acropolis of Athens. Lysistrata persuades the women of the warring cities to engage in a sex strike as a means of forcing the men to negotiate peace – a strategy that inflames the battle between the sexes.

The play's structure represents a shift from the conventions of Old Comedy, a trend typical of the author's career. It was produced in the same year as the Thesmophoriazusae, another play with female citizen protagonists, just two years after Athens's defeat in the Sicilian Expedition.

== Plot ==
LYSISTRATA

There are a lot of things about us women
That sadden me, considering how men
See us as rascals.

CALONICE

As indeed we are!

The play begins with these lines spoken by the Athenian Lysistrata and her friend Calonice. Women, as represented by Calonice, are sly hedonists in need of firm guidance and direction. In contrast, Lysistrata is portrayed to be an extraordinary woman with a large sense of individual and social responsibility. She has convened a meeting of women from various Greek city-states that are at war with each other. Soon after she confides in her friend her concerns for the female sex, the women begin arriving.

With support from the Spartan Lampito, Lysistrata persuades the other women to withhold sexual privileges from their menfolk as a means of forcing them to conclude the Peloponnesian War. The women are reluctant, but the deal is sealed with a solemn oath around a wine bowl in which the women abjure all their sexual pleasures, including the "lioness on the cheese-grater". (Note: "Lioness" is a sexual position. A scholium on the line says σχῆμα δέ ἐστιν ἀκολάστον καί ἑταιρικόν (it is a licentious and whorish position). The ancient cheese-grater "was a knife with a bronze or ivory handle, [on which] it was customary to carve all sorts of animal figures, some indeed couching upon the handle, but others standing upright, and touching the handle only with their feet.")

Soon after the oath is finished, a cry of triumph is heard from the nearby Acropolis—the old women of Athens have seized control of it at Lysistrata's instigation, since it holds the state treasury, without which the men cannot long continue to fund their war. Lampito goes off to spread the word of revolt, and the other women retreat behind the barred gates of the Acropolis to await the men's response.

A Chorus of Old Men arrives, planning on burning down the gate of the Acropolis if the women do not open up. They are still making preparations to assault the gate when a Chorus of Old Women arrives, bearing pitchers of water. The Old Women complain about the difficulty they had getting the water, but they are ready for a fight in defence of their younger comrades. Threats are exchanged, and the Old Men are defeated with the water.

The magistrate then arrives with some Scythian Archers (the Athenian version of police constables). He reflects on the nature of women, their devotion to wine, promiscuous sex, and exotic cults (such as to Sabazius and Adonis), but above all he blames men for poor supervision of their womenfolk. He has come for silver from the state treasury to buy oars for the fleet and he instructs his Scythians to begin levering open the gate. However, they are quickly overwhelmed by groups of women with long names.

Lysistrata restores order and allows the magistrate to question her. She explains the frustrations that women feel at a time of war when the men make decisions that affect everyone, and further complains that their wives' opinions are not listened to. She drapes her headdress over him, gives him a basket of wool and tells him that war will be a woman's business from now on. She then explains the pity she feels for young, childless women, aging at home while the men are away on endless campaigns. When the magistrate points out that men also age, she reminds him that men can marry at any age whereas a woman has only a short time before she is considered too old. She then dresses the magistrate like a corpse for laying out, with a wreath and a fillet, and advises him that he's dead. The magistrate storms off to report the incident to his colleagues, while Lysistrata returns to the Acropolis.

The debate continues between the Chorus of Old Men and the Chorus of Old Women until Lysistrata returns to the stage with the news that her comrades are desperate for sex and they are beginning to desert on the silliest pretexts (for example, one woman says she has to go home to air her fabrics by spreading them on the bed). After rallying her comrades and restoring their discipline, Lysistrata again returns to the Acropolis to continue waiting for the men's surrender.

A man suddenly appears, desperate for sex. It is Kinesias, the husband of Myrrhine. Lysistrata instructs her to torture him. Myrrhine informs Kinesias that she will have sex with him but only if he promises to end the war. He promptly agrees to these terms and the young couple prepares for sex on the spot. Myrrhine fetches a bed, a mattress, a pillow, a blanket, and a flask of oil, and after delaying the act for some time, locks herself in the Acropolis once more.

A Spartan herald then appears with a large burden (an erection) scarcely hidden inside his tunic and he requests to see the ruling council to arrange peace talks. The magistrate laughs at the herald's situation, but agrees that peace talks should begin.

They go off to fetch the delegates. While they are gone, the Old Women make overtures to the Old Men. The two Choruses merge, singing and dancing in unison. Peace talks commence and Lysistrata introduces the Spartan and Athenian delegates to a woman called Reconciliation. The delegates cannot take their eyes off the woman; meanwhile, Lysistrata scolds both sides for past errors of judgment. The delegates briefly squabble over the peace terms, but with Reconciliation before them, they overcome their differences and retire to the Acropolis for celebrations. The war is ended.

== Historical background ==
Some events that are significant for understanding the play:

- 424 BC: The Knights won first prize at the Lenaia. Its protagonist, a sausage-seller named Agoracritus, emerges at the end of the play as the improbable saviour of Athens (Lysistrata is its saviour thirteen years later).
- 421 BC: Peace was produced. Its protagonist, Trygaeus, emerges as the improbable champion of universal peace (Lysistrata's role 10 years later). The Peace of Nicias was formalised this same year, ending the first half of the Peloponnesian War (referred to in Lysistrata as "The Former War").
- 413 BC: The Athenians and their allies suffered a catastrophic defeat in the Sicilian Expedition, a turning-point in the long-running Peloponnesian War.
- 411 BC: Both Thesmophoriazusae and Lysistrata were produced; an oligarchic revolution (one of the consequences of the Sicilian disaster) proved briefly successful.

Old Comedy was a topical genre and the playwright expected his audience to be familiar with local identities and issues. The following list of identities mentioned in the play gives some indication of the difficulty faced by any producer trying to stage Lysistrata for modern audiences:

- Korybantes: Devotees of the Asiatic goddess Cybele—Lysistrata says that Athenian men resemble them when they do their shopping in full armour, a habit she and the other women deplore.
- Hermokopidae: Vandals who mutilated the herms in Athens at the onset of the Sicilian Expedition. They are mentioned in the play as a reason why the peace delegates should not remove their cloaks, in case they too are vandalized.
- Hippias: An Athenian tyrant, he receives two mentions in the play, as a sample of the kind of tyranny that the Old Men can "smell" in the revolt by the women and secondly in connection with a good service that the Spartans once rendered Athens (they removed him from power by force)
- Aristogeiton: A famous tyrannicide, he is mentioned briefly here with approval by the Old Men.
- Cimon: An Athenian commander, mentioned here by Lysistrata in connection with the Spartan king Pericleides who had once requested and obtained Athenian help in putting down a revolt by helots.
- Myronides: An Athenian general in the 450s, he is mentioned by the Old Men as a good example of a hairy guy, together with Phormio, the Athenian admiral who swept the Spartans from the sea between 430 and 428 BC.
- Peisander: An Athenian aristocrat and oligarch, he is mentioned here by Lysistrata as typical of a corrupt politician exploiting the war for personal gain. He was previously mentioned in Peace and The Birds
- Demostratus: An Athenian who proposed and carried the motion in support of the Sicilian Expedition, he is mentioned briefly by the magistrate.
- Cleisthenes: A notoriously effete homosexual and the butt of many jokes in Old Comedy, he receives two mentions here, firstly as a suspected mediator between the Spartans and the Athenian women and secondly as someone that sex-starved Athenian men are beginning to consider a viable proposition.
- Theogenes: A nouveau riche politician, he is mentioned here as the husband of a woman who is expected to attend the meeting called by Lysistrata. He is lampooned earlier in The Wasps, Peace and The Birds.
- Lycon: A minor politician who afterwards figured significantly in the trial of Socrates, he is mentioned here merely as the husband of a woman that the Old Men have a particular dislike for (he is mentioned also in The Wasps).
- Cleomenes I: A Spartan king, who is mentioned by the Old Men in connection with the heroism of ordinary Athenians in resisting Spartan interference in their politics.
- Leonidas: The famous Spartan king who led a Greek force against the Persians at Thermopylae, he is mentioned by the Spartan envoys in association with the Athenian victory against the Persian fleet at the Battle of Artemisium.
- Artemisia: A female ruler of Ionia, famous for her participation in the naval Battle of Salamis, she is mentioned by the Old Men with awe as a kind of Amazon.
- Homer: The epic poet is quoted in a circuitous manner when Lysistrata quotes her husband who quotes from a speech by Hector in the Iliad as he farewells his wife before going to battle: "War will be men's business."
- Aeschylus: The tragic poet is mentioned briefly as the source of a ferocious oath that Lysistrata proposes to her comrades, in which a shield is to be filled with blood; the oath is found in Aeschylus's Seven Against Thebes.
- Euripides: The dramatic poet receives two brief mentions here, in each case by the Old Men with approval as a misogynist.
- Pherecrates: A contemporary comic poet, he is quoted by Lysistrata as the author of the saying: "to skin a flayed dog."
- Bupalus: A sculptor who is known to have made a caricature of the satirist Hipponax he is mentioned here briefly by the Old Men in reference to their own desire to assault rebellious women.
- Micon: An artist, he is mentioned briefly by the Old Men in reference to Amazons (because he depicted a battle between Theseus and Amazons on the Painted Stoa).
- Timon: The legendary misanthrope, he is mentioned here with approval by the Old Women in response to the Old Men's favourable mention of Melanion, a legendary misogynist
- Orsilochus and Pellene: An Athenian pimp and a prostitute, mentioned briefly to illustrate sexual desire.

Pellene was also the name of a Peloponnesian town resisting Spartan pressure to contribute to naval operations against Athens at this time. It was mentioned earlier in the Birds.

== Writing conventions ==
Lysistrata belongs to the middle period of Aristophanes's career when he was beginning to diverge significantly from the conventions of Old Comedy. Such variations from convention include:

- The divided Chorus: The Chorus begins this play being divided (Old Men versus Old Women), and its unification later in the play is meant to exemplify reconciliation. A doubling of the role of the Chorus occurs in two other middle-period plays, The Frogs and Thesmophoriazusae, but in each of those plays the two Choruses appear consecutively rather than simultaneously. The nearest equivalent to Lysistrata's divided Chorus is found in the earliest of the surviving plays, The Acharnians, where the Chorus very briefly divides into factions for and against the protagonist.
- Parabasis: In Classical Greek comedy, parabasis is 'a speech in which the chorus comes forward and addresses the audience'. A parabasis is not featured in Lysistrata. Most plays have a second parabasis near the end, and a feature akin to a parabasis is used in this play as a replacement, however it comprises exclusively two songs (strophe and antistrophe) which are separated by an episodic scene of dialogue.
- Agon: The plays of Aristophanes contain formal disputes or agons that are constructed for rhetorical effect. Lysistrata's debate with the proboulos (magistrate) is an unusual agon in that one character (Lysistrata) does a majority of the talking, while the antagonist's dialogue (the magistrate) is reserved for questions or expressions of emotion. The informality of the agon draws attention to the absurdity of a classical woman engaging in public debate. Like most agons, it is structured symmetrically in two sections, each half comprising long verses of anapests that are introduced by a choral song and that end in a pnigos.

== Influence and legacy ==
- c. 1611: John Fletcher wrote his play The Woman's Prize, or The Tamer Tamed, which echoes Lysistrata's sex-strike plot.
- 1902: Adapted as an operetta by Paul Lincke.
- 1910: Performed at the Little Theatre in the Adelphi in London with Gertrude Kingston in the title role.
- 1934: The short-lived literary magazine Lysistrata was founded, edited by undergraduate students at Somerville College, Oxford. Virginia Woolf published her essay "Why?" (1934) in it.
- 1941: Adapted as a ballet by Richard Mohaupt, followed by a ballet suite (1946) and a new ballet version titled Der Weiberstreik von Athen (1957).
- 1956: Made into the movie musical The Second Greatest Sex, with songs by Henry Mancini produced at Universal Studios and directed by George Marshall, starring Jeanne Crain, George Nader and Bert Lahr. It was re-set in the 19th-century American wild west.
- 1961: The play was adapted into an episode of Wanted Dead or Alive (TV series) titled "To the Victor". In this episode, the sheriff of the town of Coronado sends for bounty hunter Josh Randall and offers him $500 if he can get the women of the town to end their boycott of men. The women's terms are that the men give up their guns.
- 1961: The play served as the basis for the musical The Happiest Girl in the World. The play was revived in the National Theatre's 1992–93 season, transferring successfully from the South Bank to Wyndham's Theatre.
- 1968: Feminist director Mai Zetterling made the film Flickorna (released in English as The Girls), starring three reigning Swedish film actresses: Bibi Andersson, Harriet Andersson and Gunnel Lindblom, who were depicted playing roles in Lysistrata.

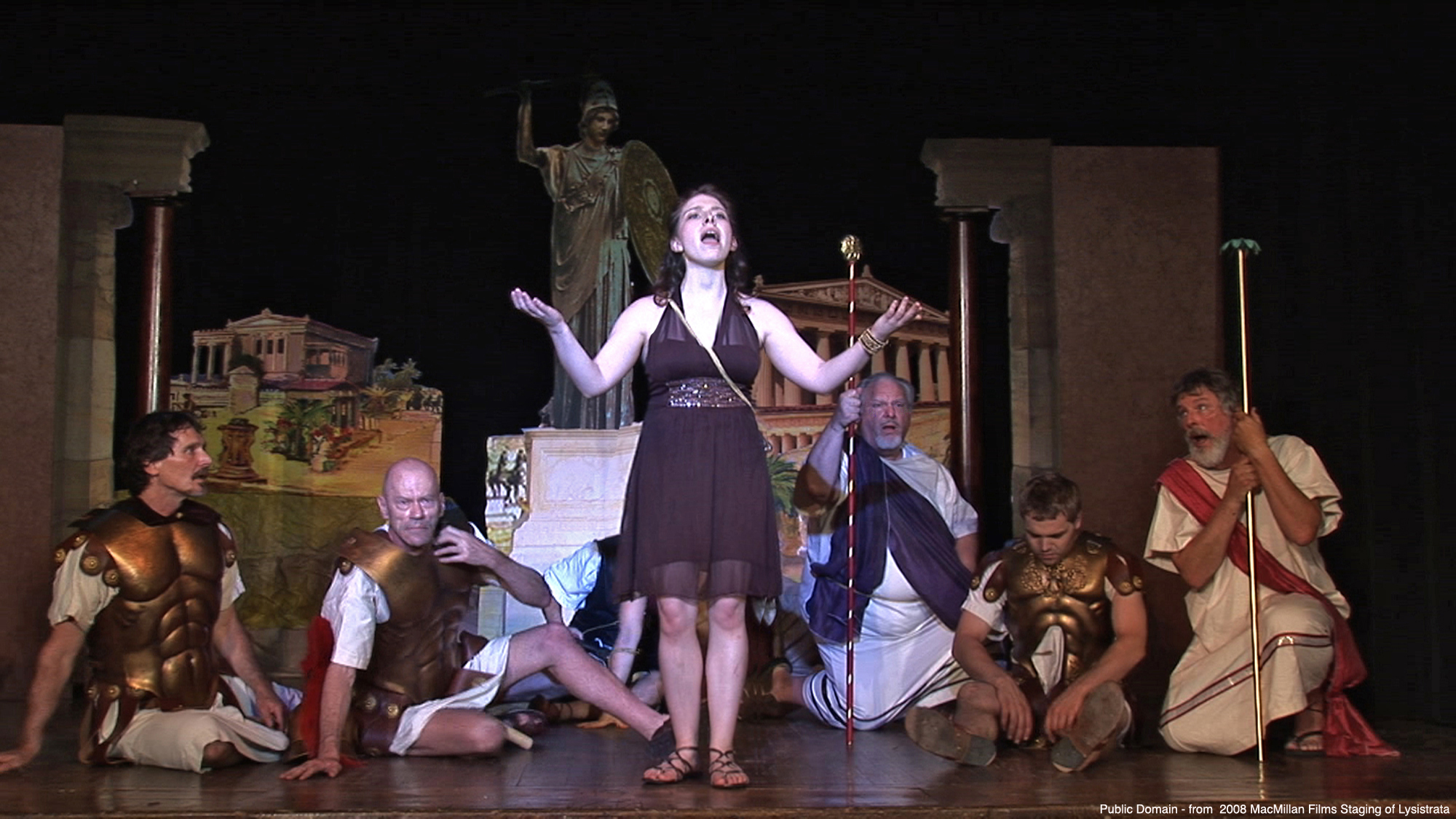
A 2007 staging of Lysistrata

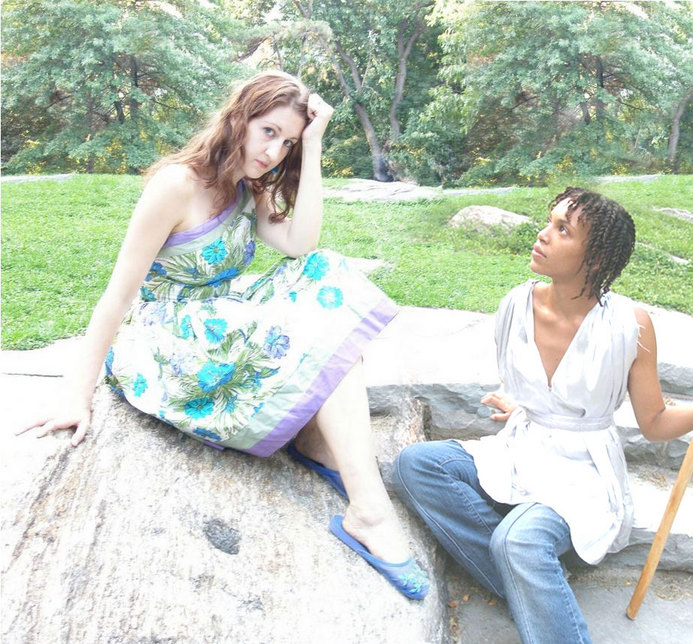
From the 2005 staging of Lysistrata produced in Central Park.

- 1982: Utopia's album Swing to the Right featured an anti-war song entitled "Lysistrata" that loosely paraphrases the content of the drama as dialogue between the song's protagonist and his female significant other.
- 1983: Şalvar Davası, a Turkish movie adaptation based loosely on Lysistrata, directed by Kartal Tibet and starring Müjde Ar.
- 1984: On the Perimeter by Caroline Blackwood compared activists at Greenham Common Women's Peace Camp to women of Lysistrata.
- 1985: David Brin's post-apocalyptic novel The Postman, which had themes of duty, war, peace, and gender roles, is dedicated: "To Benjamin Franklin, devious genius, and to Lysistrata, who tried".
- 2001: A titular opera was composed by Mikis Theodorakis. It is dedicated to global peace.
- 2003: In reaction to the Iraq disarmament crisis, a peace protest initiative, The Lysistrata Project, was based on readings of the play held worldwide on March 3, 2003.
- 2004: A 100-person show called Lysistrata 100 was performed in Brooklyn, New York. Edward Einhorn wrote the adaptation, which was performed in a pub. The play was set at the Dionysia, much as the original may have been.
- 2005: An opera, Lysistrata, or The Nude Goddess, composed by Mark Adamo, premiered at the Houston Grand Opera in March.
- 2011: Lysistrata Jones, a contemporary riff by Douglas Carter Beane (book) and Lewis Flinn (music, lyrics) for the Transport Group Theater Company, starred Patti Murin and Liz Mikel, and opened in New York at the Judson Memorial Church Gymnasium and later transferred to Broadway.
- 2011: Valerie Schrag adapted and illustrated the play for volume one of the graphic-novel anthology The Graphic Canon, edited by Russ Kick and published by Seven Stories Press.
- 2011: Radu Mihăileanu directed The Source (French: La Source des femmes) set in a village in North Africa, focusing on a group of women who go on strike against having to fetch water for the village from a distant well.
- 2012: Isabelle Ameganvi, a civil-rights lawyer in Togo (Africa), called on the women of Togo to deny sexual relations with their men in protest against President Faure Gnassingbé.
- 2015: American filmmaker Spike Lee's film Chi-Raq transposes the events of the play into modern-day inner-city Chicago, substituting gun violence among African-Americans for the Peloponnesian War and rhyming rap dialogue for Greek poetry.
- 2016: Animator Richard Williams's Oscar-nominated short film, Prologue, is "the first part of a feature film loosely based on Aristophanes's anti-war play Lysistrata."
- 2016: Writer-director Matt Cooper's film comedy Is That a Gun in Your Pocket? is about a Texas town whose women go on a sex strike to make their menfolk abandon their love of guns.
- 2026: A six-minute animated short Lysistrata, the posthumous sequel to Richard Williams's Prologue, was previewed at the 2026 Annecy International Animation Film Festival in June.

== English translations ==
- 1872, William James Hickie, The Comedies of Aristophanes. A New and Literal Translation, Vol 2 (London: Bohn's Library).
- 1912, published by the Athenian Society, London; unknown translator rumored to be Oscar Wilde. At Wikisource
- 1924, Benjamin B. Rogers, verse
- 1925, Jack Lindsay, verse
- 1934, Arthur S. Way, verse
- 1944, Charles T. Murphy, prose and verse
- 1954, Dudley Fitts, prose and verse
- 1961, Donald Sutherland, prose and verse
- 1963, Douglass Parker, verse
- 1972, Germaine Greer, prose
- 1973, Alan H. Sommerstein, prose and verse: available for digital loan
- 1988, Jeffrey Henderson, verse
- 1991, Nicholas Rudall
- 2000, George Theodoridis, 2000, prose
- 2002, David Landon, prose and verse
- 2003, Sarah Ruden
- 2004, Paul Roche, verse and prose
- 2005, Edward Einhorn, prose and verse
- 2003/06, Chris Tilley, musical version with prose and songs
- 2008, Ian C. Johnston, verse
- 2010, David Stuttard, prose and verse
- Anonymous translator, prose

== See also ==
- Codex Ravennas 429

== Sources ==
- Aristophanes (1973). The Acharnians: And The Clouds and Lysistrata. Translated by Sommerstein, Alan H. Penguin. ISBN 978-0-14-044287-8.
