= Cleonymus of Athens =

5th-century BC Athenian politician and general

Cleonymus (Ancient Greek: Κλεωνύμος) was a political ally of Cleon and an Athenian general. Cleonymus was notorious for two things, his enormous size and gluttony, and most infamously, he dropped his shield and fled during the Athenian retreat at the Battle of Delium. He was branded a coward. This act is often used to comedic effect by Aristophanes in 6 different plays, The Acharnians, The Knights, The Clouds, The Wasps, Peace, and The Birds.
