= The Lysistrata Project (protest) =

The Lysistrata Project was a peace protest initiative in which thousands of readings of Aristophanes's play Lysistrata were held on March 3, 2003 internationally, in reaction to the Iraq disarmament crisis. The event was co-founded by New York actresses Kathryn Blume and Sharron Bower.
