= Stott Parker =

American computer scientist (1952–2022)

D. Stott Parker Jr.
- Born: December 31, 1952; New Haven, Connecticut, U.S.
- Died: October 4, 2022 (aged 69); Eugene, Oregon, U.S.
- Education: Princeton University; University of Illinois Urbana-Champaign
- Scientific career
- Fields: Computer science, data mining
- Doctoral advisor: David Kuck

Douglass Stott Parker (December 31, 1952 – October 4, 2022) was a professor of computer science at UCLA from 1979 to his retirement in 2016, specializing in Data Mining, Bioinformatics, Database Management, Scientific Data Management and Modeling.

Parker was an investigator in the UCLA Center for Computational Biology (an NIH NCBC center), the UCLA Center for Cognitive Phenomics (an NIH project), and worked with Chris Lee on bioinformatics databases. He was the son of classics professor Douglass Parker.

== Biography ==
Parker was born in New Haven, Connecticut, to Haverly Hubert Parker and classics professor Douglass Parker. He received the A.B. in Mathematics cum laude from Princeton University in 1974. He completed his M.S. and Ph.D. at the University of Illinois Urbana-Champaign in 1976 and 1978, respectively. Following a period of postdoctoral research at the Université Grenoble Alpes in France, he joined the Faculty of the UCLA Computer Science Department in 1979.
