= Andromeda (play) =

Lost play by Euripides

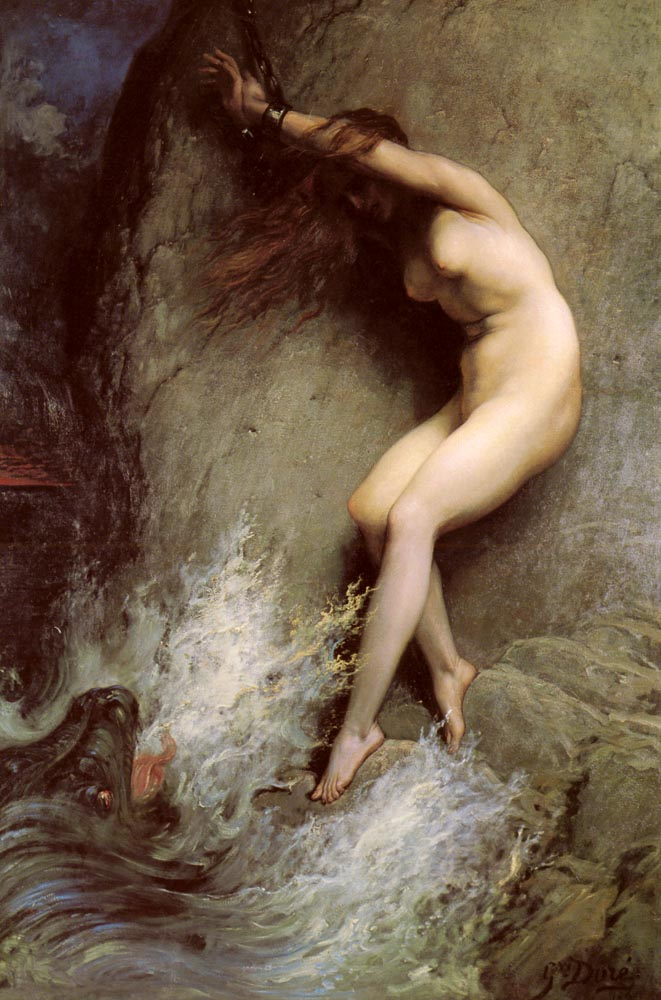
- Andromeda exposed to the sea-monster (1869) Gustave Doré.
- Original language: Ancient Greek
- Written by: Euripides
- Chorus: Parthenoi, virgin women
- Characters: Andromeda; Perseus; Echo; Messenger; Cepheus? Athena? Others?
- Genre: Tragedy

Premiere
- Date: 412 BC
- Place: Athens

Andromeda (Ancient Greek: Ἀνδρομέδα, Androméda) is a lost tragedy written by Euripides, based on the myth of Andromeda and first produced in 412 BC, in a trilogy that also included Euripides' Helen. Andromeda may have been the first depiction on stage of a young man falling in love with a woman. The play has been lost; however, a number of fragments are extant. In addition, a number of ancient sources refer to the play, including several references in plays by Aristophanes.

== Plot ==
Several aspects of the plot of Andromeda can be inferred from the extant fragments and references. The play opened with Andromeda alone on stage, having been chained to a rock near the sea and near a cave by her father Cepheus, King of Aethiopia, to be eaten by a sea monster. This was to mollify the sea god Poseidon after either Cepheus or his wife Cassiopeia had offended the god. Andromeda laments her fate alone, with only her echo to respond. A chorus of virgins (parthenoi) appears as Andromeda's lament continues. Then Perseus appears, using the crane to depict his flight on winged sandals, "planting my foot on high, cutting a path through the midst of the ether," having just defeated the Gorgon Medusa.

Upon appearing, Perseus believes Andromeda is a statue and remarks "Hold—what promontory do I see here, lapped by sea foam, and what maiden's likeness, a statue carved by an expert hand to her very form in stone?" When Perseus asks Andromeda if she will show his gratitude if he saves her, she responds "Take me, stranger, whether for servant, wife, or slave." During their dialogue, Perseus apparently moved from being struck by Andromeda's beauty to feeling pity for her to falling in love with her. This may have been the first depiction of a man falling in love with a woman on stage. In fragment 136, Perseus famously demands of Eros to "either don't teach us to see beauty in what is beautiful, or help those who are in love to succeed in their efforts as they suffer the toils that you yourself have crafted," stating further that if Eros does so he will "be honored by mortals" but if not those in love will no longer give Eros their gratitude. A messenger delivered the news that Perseus had successfully defeated the sea monster.

The play also included scenes in which Perseus describes his adventure with Medusa and in which he insists on marrying Andromeda against Cepheus' wishes, but other scenes may have been included as well. Andromeda concurred that she wanted to live with Perseus rather than her parents, and some of the dialogue may have discussed the conflict between Andromeda's duty to her parents and her loyalty to Perseus, as well as the desirability of Perseus as a husband. The play most likely ended with the goddess Athena appearing as a deus ex machina to announce that Perseus and Andromeda would be married and that all the characters would become constellations. Athena likely also prophesied that the descendants of Perseus and Andromeda would become the rulers of Mycenae.

== Antecedents ==
Little is known of treatments of the Andromeda myth prior to Euripides. However, Sophocles wrote a play entitled Andromeda, which covered the same story and was believed to have been performed around 450 BC. Sophocles' Andromeda is now lost except for a few fragments. Euripides treated earlier aspects of the Perseus myth in his earlier plays Danae (between 455 and 425 BC), which covered Perseus' birth, and Dictys (431 BC), which covered his defeat of Medusa.

== Later references to the play ==
Information about Andromeda is largely based on later sources, including the Bibliotheca, Ovid's treatment of the story in Metamorphoses and references in astrological handbooks to the constellations Andromeda, Cepheus, and Cassiopeia, which refer to Euripides' play. There are also references to Andromeda in at least two plays by Aristophanes.

In 411, a year after Euripides' plays were first produced, Aristophanes incorporated extended parodies of both Helen and Andromeda in his comedy Thesmophoriazusae. Euripides, who is a character in Thesmophoriazusae, needs to save a kinsman who was captured dressed as a woman infiltrating an all-woman festival. Euripides first attempts to do this by a parody of the scene in which Menelaus arrives dressed in rags. He then uses a parody of Andromeda in which the kinsman as Andromeda laments his fate to the response of his echo, Euripides as Perseus arrives via the crane, and falls quickly in love with her. In the parody, Perseus' love as depicted in Andromeda is transformed to lust.

Aristophanes also referenced Andromeda in his 405 play The Frogs, where the god Dionysus states that while reading Andromeda he was smitten with longing for Euripides.

It has been reported from antiquity that Alexander the Great was able to perform a portion of Andromeda by heart.

Classicist Gilbert Murray commented that "Only a few fragments of the Andromeda remain, but they are curiously beautiful; and the play as a whole seems to have been the one unclouded love-romance that Euripides ever wrote. Murray also related a story told by Lucian (in "The Way to Write History") writing 500 years after Andromeda was first produced, that people in Abdera, Thrace, were stricken by the play and walked around "as though in a dream" while mumbling to themselves a speech from the play which began "O love, high monarch over gods and men..."
