= Phaeax (orator) =

5th-century BC Athenian orator and statesman

Phaeax (Greek: Φαίαξ) was an Athenian orator and statesman. The son of Erasistratus, his date of his birth is not known, but he was a contemporary of Nicias and Alcibiades. Plutarch (Alcib. 13) says, that he and Nicias were the only rivals whom Alcibiades feared when he entered upon public life.

In 422 BC, Phaeax, with two others, was sent as an ambassador to Italy and Sicily, to endeavor to persuade the Magna Graecian allies of the Athenians and the other Siceliotes to aid the Leontines against the Syracusans. He succeeded with Camarina and Agrigentum, but his failure at Gela led him to abandon the attempt as hopeless. On his way back he assisted the Athenian cause among the states of Italy. (Thucyd. v. 4, 5.) According to Theophrastus (ap. Plut.) it was Phaeax, and not Nicias, with whom Alcibiades united for the purpose of ostracizing Hyperbolus. Most authorities, however, are of the view that it was Nicias. (Plut. l.c. Nic. 11, Aristid. 7.)

In the "Lives of the Ten Orators" (Andoc.) there is mention of a contest between Phaeax and Andocides, and a defence of the latter against the former. It is difficult to say exactly when this content took place. Andocides did not come into notice until after the affair of the mutilation of the Hermae.

Phaeax was an engaging personality, but had no great abilities as a speaker. According to Eupolis (ap. Plut. Alcib. 13) he was a fluent talker, but quite unable to speak. (Comp. A. Gellius, N. A. i. 15.) Aristophanes gives a description of his style of speaking (Equit. 1377, etc.), from which it would seem that, on one occasion, he was brought to trial for some capital offence and acquitted.

There has been a good deal of controversy regarding the speech against Alcibiades, commonly attributed to Andocides, which Taylor maintained to be prepared by Phaeax. Plutarch (Alcib. 13), according to the opinion of most editors, speaks of an oration against Alcibiades, as prepared by Phaeax. It seems likely that he was referring to the very oration which is extant, the passage which he quotes (though not quite accurately) being found in the speech in question, which could not have been written by Andocides, as the author speaks of the rival claim of himself, Nicias, and Alcibiades being decided by ostracism. There are, however, strong reasons for believing that it is the product of some rhetorician writing in the name of Phaeax. The style does not at all resemble what the notice in Aristophanes would lead us to expect; and the writer betrays himself by various inaccuracies. If then the speech was written as if by Phaeax, and reliance can be placed on the biographical notices in it (which are in part at least borne out by good authorities), Phaeax was subject to being tried for his life four times, and each time he was acquitted (§ 8, 36. Comp. Aristoph. l.c.). He was sent as ambassador to Thessaly, Macedonia, Molossia, and Thesprotia, besides Sicily and Italy, and was awarded various prizes. (Taylor, Led. Lys. c. 6; Valckenaer, Advers. ap. Sluiter, Lect. Andoc. pp. 17–26; Ruhnken, Hist. Crit. Orat. Gr. Opusc. p. 321, et seq.; Becker, Andokides, pp. 13 et seq., 83-108; and especially Meier, Comment. de Andocidis quae vulgo fertur oratione contra Alcibiadem.)
