= Theognis (statesman) =

Athenian statesman and playwright (?)

Theognis (Ancient Greek: Θέογνις) was a member of the Thirty Tyrants of Athens (Xenophon, Hellenica 2.3.2; Lysias 12.6). Lysias was able to escape from the house of Damnippus, where Theognis was guarding other aristocrats rounded up by the Thirty.

Some ancient sources (scholia to Aristophanes and the Suda) identify Theognis the tyrant with the minor tragic poet of the same name, known from Aristophanes' mocking references to the frigidity of his poetry (Acharnians 11 and 138, Thesmophoriazusae 170).

The Suda wrote that he was also called Chion (Χιὼν).
