= Lamachus =

5th-century BC Athenian general

Lamachus (Ancient Greek: Λάμαχος) was an Athenian strategos or general in the Peloponnesian War. He commanded as early as 435 BCE, and was prominent by the mid 420s. Aristophanes caricatured him in The Acharnians and subsequently honoured his memory in The Frogs. He was one of the three generals (alongside Nicias and Alcibiades) placed in command of the Sicilian Expedition.

Lamachus, though older, was known for his fiery disposition and was fond of taking risks in battle. He was also so poor that during the campaigns in which he served as a general, he would charge the Athenian people money for his own clothes and boots. Although Lamachus was known for his courage and military skill, he was sometimes thought less qualified than other generals because he lacked the necessary wealth and social position.

Plutarch first mentions Lamachus in The Life of Pericles. Lamachus was given command of a fleet of thirteen ships so that he might aid the citizens of Sinope against Timesileos. The probable date of this expedition is 438–432 BCE between the Samian War and the beginning of the Peloponnesian War.

Thucydides states that Lamachus was sent to the Euxine again in 424 BCE for the purpose of collecting tributes. Lamachus had sailed into the Pontus and anchored his ships in the river Calex. There he lost ten of his ships during a sudden flood, but was able to deliver his men safely to Chalcedon.

In 415 BCE, Lamachus was elected general of the Sicilian Expedition with Nicias and Alcibiades. Lamachus proposed an aggressive strategy against Syracuse thinking that the Athenians should attack as soon as possible while the inhabitants were still unprepared for battle. His proposal was rejected in favor of the strategy of Alcibiades, which consisted of gathering allies around Sicily prior to engagement. Donald Kagan has suggested that Lamachus's strategy might well have brought Athens a quick victory instead of the disaster that ensued. Lamachus died fighting in Sicily after he and a handful of his men were trapped on the wrong side of a ditch and overwhelmed.
