= Cleisthenes (son of Sibyrtius) =

Athenian delegate during the Peloponnesian War

- Κλεισθένης
- Pronunciation: /ˈklaɪsθɪniːz/ KLYSSE-thin-eez
- Citizenship: Athenian
- Occupation: Theoros (delegate)
- Era: Classical Greece
- Known for: Role during the Peloponnesian War
- Notable work: Mentioned in Aristophanes' plays (Acharnians, Knights, The Frogs, The Clouds, Lysistrata, Thesmophoriazusae)
- Relatives: Sibyrtius (Athenian) (possibly) (Note: Aristophanes calls him son of Sibyrtius, the operator of a wrestling school, but the connection is frequently taken to be a joke either at Cleisthenes's expense (playing on the unlikelihood of him engaging in a traditionally masculine sport) or at Sibyrtius's expense (suggesting a sexual encounter with Cleisthenes). (Aristophanes: Acharnians, Knights. Translated by Henderson, Jeffrey. Harvard University Press. 1998. p. 72–73 & n.20. ISBN 0-674-99567-8.) (Aristophanes: Lysistrata, The Acharnians, The Clouds. Translated by Sommerstein, A. Penguin Classics. 1975. p. 240.))

Cleisthenes (/ˈklaɪsθɪniːz/ KLYSSE-thin-eez; Ancient Greek: Κλεισθένης), also Clisthenes or Kleisthenes, was a prominent Athenian delegate (theoros) during the Peloponnesian War (431 BC). The comedian Aristophanes used him frequently as the butt of jokes and as a character in his plays, ridiculing him for being effeminate and/or passive homosexual (kinaidos). He is notably mentioned in The Frogs, The Clouds, Lysistrata, and Thesmophoriazusae.
