= Douglass Parker =

American classicist, academic and translator (1927–2011)

Douglass Parker

Douglass Stott Parker Sr. (May 27, 1927 – February 8, 2011) was an American classicist, academic, and translator. He was one of the first scholars to write favorably about J. R. R. Tolkien's The Lord of the Rings. He was the father of computer scientist Stott Parker.

== Early life ==
Douglass Parker was born in LaPorte, Indiana, the son of Cyril Rodney Parker and Isobel (née Douglass) Parker. He received an undergraduate degree from the University of Michigan; he gained his doctorate from Princeton University, about Lucretius's use of Epicurean imagery. He was a Fellow at the Center for Hellenic Studies in 1961–1962, its inaugural year, and a Guggenheim Scholar.

== Expertise ==
Parker is known for his work in Greek and Roman comedy, particularly his translations of Aristophanes’ plays Lysistrata (1964), The Wasps (1962) and The Congresswomen (Ecclesiazusae) (1967). He is also known for his translations of Terence’s The Eunuch (Eunuchus), and Plautus' The Brothers Menaechmus (Menaechmi), as well as other classical and literary works. His translations of plays have been republished multiple times, and have been performed around the world. Lysistrata has had over two hundred productions.

== Accolades ==
His translation of The Congresswomen (Ecclesiazusae) was among the Finalists for The National Book Award in the category of Translation in 1968.

== Teaching ==
Parker was Professor of Classics at the University of Texas at Austin for forty years, recruited there in 1967 by William Arrowsmith. Earlier he had been a professor at Yale (1953–55) and at the University of California, Riverside (1955–67).

He taught classes in Greek and Latin languages and literature, as well as a discipline of his own creation, parageography—the study of imaginary worlds. His courses crossed traditional disciplinary boundaries and were popular; he was known at the University of Texas for his breadth of knowledge and teaching, and won graduate and undergraduate teaching awards.

In 2011, the journal Didaskalia dedicated its new endeavors to "Douglass Parker, who embodied the interplay between scholarship and practice, between an acute understanding of the ancient world and a keen sense of modern audience." Didaskalia subsequently published a pair of wide-ranging interviews from 1981 and 1982.

== Other interests ==
Parker had a passion for jazz, playing the trombone throughout his life, and elements of jazz improvisation and creativity were themes in his research and teaching.

He was interested in fantasy and science fiction, and published one of the first scholarly analyses of Tolkien's The Lord of the Rings. In that review, titled "Hwaet We Holbytla ...", he rebutted Edmund Wilson's "rather nasty" attack on the book, calling the novel "probably the most original and varied creation ever seen in the genre, and certainly the most self-consistent".

== Parageography ==
Creativity and fantasy are foundations of imaginary worlds—including those of the Odyssey, the Land of Oz, and Middle-earth—and in parageography, Parker sought insight on the creative process of writing and worldbuilding. He referred to the parageography course as "a course in 'Applied Creativity'".

Parker often combined elements of creativity with comedy, and starting in 1979 for example, developed installments of Zeus in Therapy, a series of humorous verse monologues in which Zeus reflects on his experiences and complains to his therapist about difficulties of managing the universe. The imagined sessions in these installments get at the power of one's innermost thoughts. A theatrical adaptation of "Zeus in Therapy" was developed by the Tutto Theatre Company in August 2013.

== Death ==
Parker died after a bout with cancer in Austin, Texas, at age 83. He suggested that his epitaph read: "but I digress...".

== Works ==
- Parker, Douglass (1957). "Hwaet We Holbylta... (review of The Lord of the Rings, by J.R.R. Tolkien)". Hudson Review. 9 (4): 598–609. JSTOR 4621633.
- ————— (1961). The Acharnians, by Aristophanes. University of Michigan Press.
- ————— (1962). The Wasps, by Aristophanes. University of Michigan Press.
- ————— (1964). Lysistrata, by Aristophanes. University of Michigan Press, Signet Classics.
- ————— (1967). The Congresswomen (Ecclesiazusae), by Aristophanes. University of Michigan Press.
- ————— (1969). "The Wasps". In William Arrowsmith (ed.). Aristophanes—Three Comedies: The Birds; The Clouds; The Wasps. University of Michigan Press. ISBN 978-0-472-06153-2.
- ————— (1969). "Lysistrata; The Acharnians; The Congresswomen". In William Arrowsmith (ed.). Aristophanes—Four Comedies: Lysistrata; The Acharnians; The Congresswomen; The Frogs. University of Michigan Press. ISBN 978-0-472-06152-5.
- ————— (1974). "The Eunuch (Eunochous); Phormio". In Palmer Bovie (ed.). Terence: the Comedies. Johns Hopkins University Press. ISBN 978-0-8018-4354-9.
- Deena Berg, Douglass Parker, ed. (1999). "Menaechmi (Double Bind); Bacchides (The Wild Women)". Five Comedies (by Plautus and Terence): Miles Gloriosus, Menaechmi, Bacchides, Hecyra and Adelphoe. Hackett. ISBN 978-0-87220-362-4.
- ————— (1969). "The Ovidian Coda". Arion. 8 (1): 80–97. JSTOR 20163183.
- ————— (1979). "Ars Poetica I: Beginning". Hudson Review. 31 (4): 631–634. doi:10.2307/3850044. JSTOR 3850044.
- ————— (1985). "The Curious Case of Pharaoh's Polyp, And Related Matters". SubStance. 14 (2): 74–86. doi:10.2307/3685053. JSTOR 3685053.
- ————— (April 8, 1991). "The Two Homers". The New Republic. pp. 33–38 – via HighBeam Research.
- ————— , Wolfgang F. Michael (1991). Anabion 1540: Text Lateinisch und Deutsch (translation and commentary in German of Johannes Sapidus' work of 1540: Anabion). Peter Lang. ISBN 978-3-261-04266-8.
- ————— (1991). "Places for Anything: Building Imaginary Worlds". In Harry A. Wilmer (ed.). Creativity: Paradoxes & Reflections. Chiron Publications. ISBN 978-0-933029-44-6.
- ————— (1994). "'Donna Lee' and the Ironies of Bebop". In Dave Oliphant (ed.). The Bebop Revolution in Words and Music. Harry Ransom Humanities Research Center, University of Texas. ISBN 978-0-87959-131-1.
- ————— (2014). "Eirini (Peace), Ploutos (Money, the God; Plutus; Wealth), Samia (Wedding Day; The Girl from Samos)". In Timothy J. Moore (ed.). Three Comedies (by Aristophanes and Menander): Peace; Money, the God; Samia. Hackett Publishing Company, Incorporated. ISBN 978-1-62466-185-3.
