= Hyperbolus =

Athenian politician (died 412/411 BC)

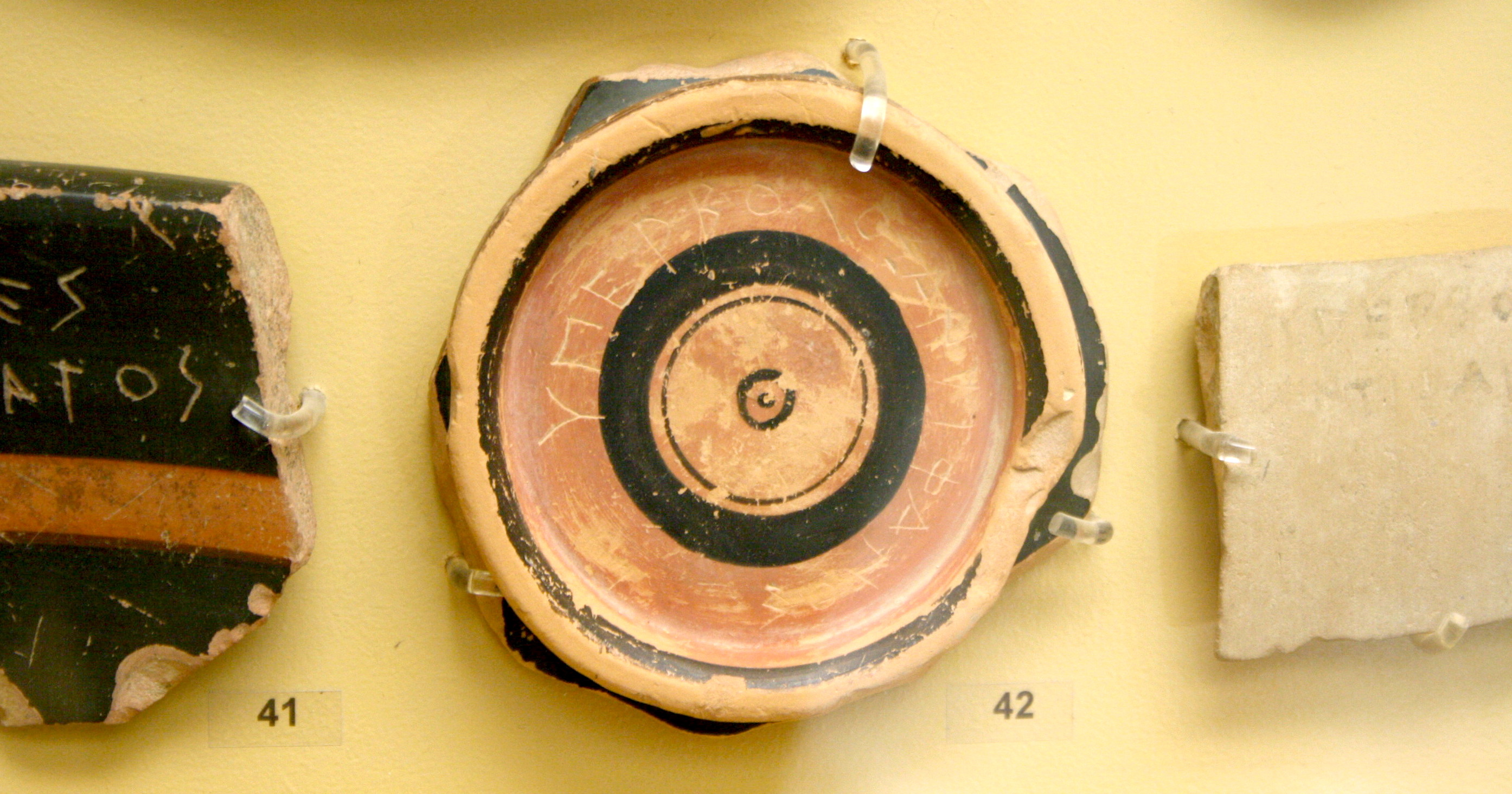
Ostracon against Hyperbolus (c. 417 BC).

Hyperbolus (Ancient Greek: Ὑπέρβολος, Hyperbolos; died 412/411 BC) was an Athenian politician active during the first half of the Peloponnesian War, coming to particular prominence after the death of Cleon. In 416 or 415 BC, he was the last Athenian to be ostracised.

== Life ==
A fragment of a document by 4th-century BC Greek historian Theopompus suggests that Hyperbolus was the son of Chremes, but surviving ostraka prove that his father's name was actually Antiphanes. Some ancient sources claim that Hyperbolus was from a slave family, though the fact that his father had a Greek name makes this unlikely.

Hyperbolus was a demagogue, and an allusion in Aristophanes' play The Knights suggests that he, like Cleon (another demagogue of the late fifth century), supported an ambitious Athenian foreign policy. The precise details of his political career are unknown, but he seems to have been a member of the boule and possibly a trierarch.

Hyperbolus was a frequent target of the authors of Old Comedy. The first to satirise him was supposedly Hermippus; Plato the comic poet and Eupolis wrote plays about him; and there are allusions to Hyperbolus in seven of Aristophanes' surviving plays, from Acharnians in 425 to The Frogs in 405 BC. By contrast, only a single "contemptuous" reference to Hyperbolus is found in Thucydides.

In 416 or 415 BC, Hyperbolus proposed an ostracism, and was himself ostracised. In 412/411 BC he was murdered on Samos. According to Thucydides, the Athenian general Charminus was involved in the killing. Theopompus claims that Hyperbolus' body was stuffed into a wineskin and thrown into the sea; this may be derived from a comedy.

== Ostracism ==
Sometime between the years 417 and 415 BC, Hyperbolus was ostracised. According to Plutarch, who described the ostracism in three of his Lives, the ostracism was proposed by Hyperbolus himself, intending to have either Nicias or Alcibiades – Theophrastus says Alcibiades or Phaeax – ostracised; the two politicians put aside their differences and persuaded their supporters to vote to ostracise Hyperbolus instead.

The date of the ostracism is uncertain. It was traditionally thought that Hyperbolus was ostracised in 417 BC, six years before he was murdered. However, an inscription naming Hyperbolus as the proposer of an amendment to a law was restored in 1949 by A. G. Woodhead, which suggests that he was still active after an ostracism in 417 ought to have taken place. As Nicias and Alcibiades were potential victims of the ostracism, however, it cannot have taken place any later than 415 BC; 416 or 415 are thus the only possible years for the ostracism to have taken place. P. J. Rhodes suggests that 415 BC is slightly more likely.

== Legacy ==
Ostracism does not seem ever to have been used again in Athens after Hyperbolus, though the practice was never formally abolished. According to Plutarch, this was because the Athenians were so disgusted with the outcome of the ostracism that they abandoned the practice. Rhodes argues, however, that ostracism was in fact abandoned because it was too imprecise, and from the late fifth century the Athenians began to use more targeted methods for holding office-holders to account. For instance, 415 BC, the probable date of the last ostracism, was also the earliest date a legal process known as graphe paranomon is known to have been in use.

== Works cited ==
- Baldwin, Barry (1971), "Notes on Hyperbolus", Acta Classica, 14
- Hornblower, Simon (2011), The Greek World: 479–323 BC (4 ed.), Abingdon: Routledge
- Rhodes, P. J. (1994), "The Ostracism of Hyberbolus", in Osborne, Robin; Hornblower, Simon (eds.), Ritual, Finance, Politics: Athenian Democratic Accounts presented to David Lewis, Oxford: Clarendon Press
