= Benjamin Bickley Rogers =

British classical scholar (1828–1919)

Benjamin Bickley Rogers (11 December 1828 – 22 September 1919) was an English classical scholar.

Rogers was born in Shepton Montague, Somerset in 1828.

He was educated at Highgate School and Wadham College, Oxford, where he became President of the Oxford Union in 1853. He was elected a Fellow of the college in 1852 and was called to the bar in 1856. He gave up a successful legal practice when increasing deafness obliged him to retire.

He then devoted himself exclusively to literature. He translated all the plays of Aristophanes, reproducing the Greek metres in the English version. Some of the comic verses use the metre of the Major-General's song in Gilbert and Sullivan's Pirates of Penzance.

In March 1902 he was elected an Honorary Fellow of Wadham College.

Rogers died in Twickenham on 22 September 1919.
