= Arthur Way =

English scholar (1847–1930)

Arthur Sanders Way
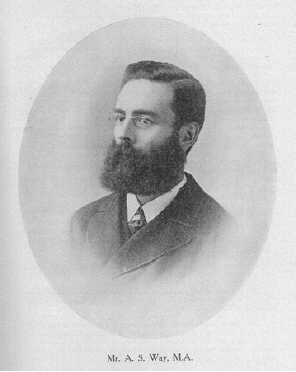
- Born: 13 February 1847; Dorking, Surrey, England
- Died: 25 September 1930 (aged 83); Ventnor, Isle of Wight
- Occupations: Classical scholar, headmaster
- Writing career
- Notable works: Homer; Greek through English; Sons of the Violet-Crowned, a Tale of Ancient Athens

Arthur Sanders Way (13 February 1847 – 25 September 1930), was a classical scholar, translator and headmaster of Wesley College, Melbourne, Australia.

== Career ==
Arthur Way was born at Dorking, England. to the Rev. William Way and his wife Matilda, née Francis.

His translations in Miller's Australian Literature includes the Odyssey; the Iliad; works of Euripides, Aeschylus, and Sophocles; the Epodes of Horace; Vergil's Georgics; the Nibelungenlied; the Chanson de Roland; works of Theocritus, Bion, and Moschus; the Pauline epistles and the Epistle to the Hebrews; works of Aristophanes, Hesiod, Lucretius, and others. He also wrote Homer (1913), Greek through English (1926), and Sons of the Violet-Crowned, a Tale of Ancient Athens (1929).

Way had been president of the Melbourne Shakespeare Society and a councillor of the Royal Society of Victoria. Way died at Ventnor, Isle of Wight, on 25 September 1930.

== Sources ==
- Serle, Percival (1949). "Way, Arthur Sanders". Dictionary of Australian Biography. Sydney: Angus & Robertson.
