= Hypotyposis =

Figure of speech

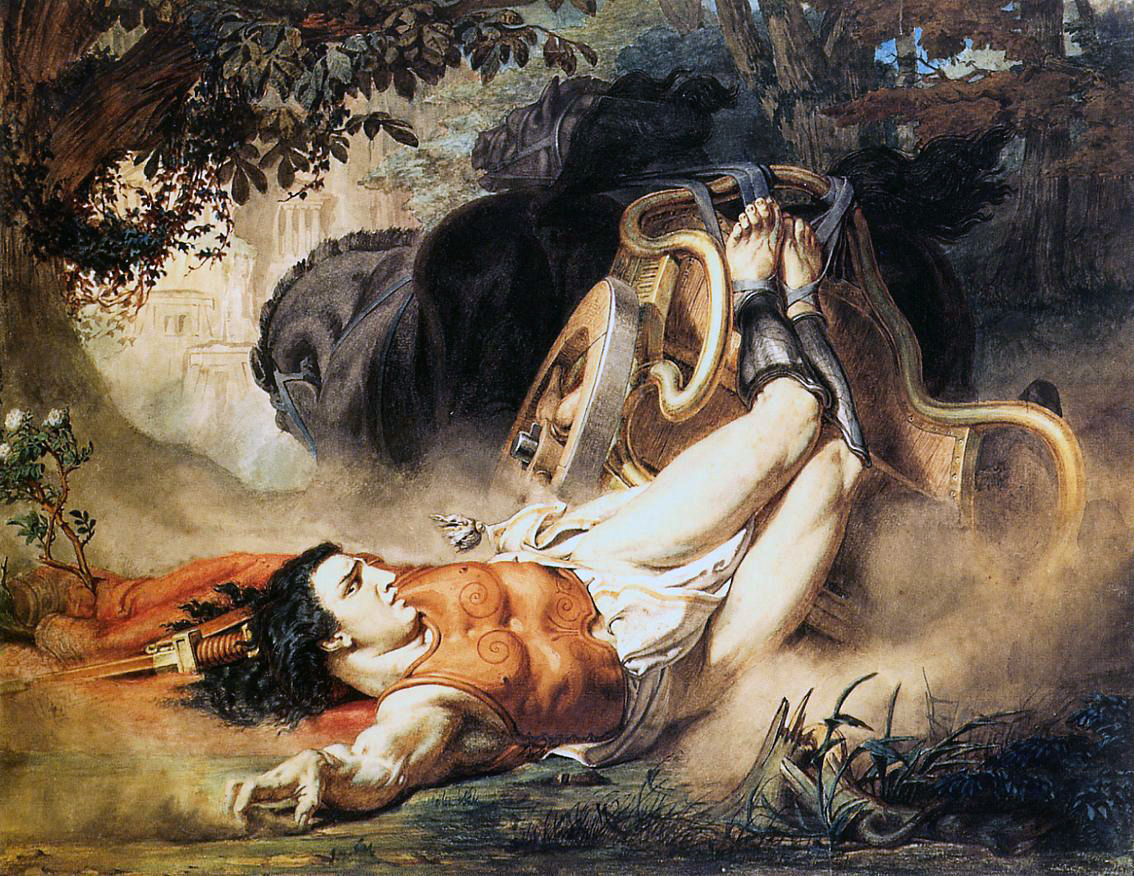
Lawrence Alma-Tadema, La Mort d'Hippolyte, 1860.

Hypotyposis /ˌhaɪpətaɪˈpoʊsɪs/ (from the ancient Greek ὑποτύπωσις/hupotúpôsis, "sketch, model") is a figure of speech consisting of a realistic, animated, and striking description of the scene of which one wants to give an imagined representation and as if experienced at the moment of its expression. The speech of the nurse in the Prologue of Euripides' Medea, Racine's "dream of Athalie" in the play of the same name, Cicero's portrait of Clodius in his Pro Milone, or Émile Zola's description of the alembic in his novel L'Assommoir are examples of hypotyposes.

It can take the form of an enumeration of concrete details to such an extent that one can say that it crosses the conditions of form proper to a figure of speech. Indeed, the figure can easily go beyond the framework of the sentence to develop over several sentences or even several pages.

For the Latin orator Quintilian, hypotyposis is "the image of things, so well represented by the word that the listener believes he sees it rather than hears it". It allows the composition of vast poetic tableaux "giving to see" a scene as if the limits of the sentence no longer existed. A figure based on the image, it has been, since the beginning of rhetoric, the preferred method for animating descriptions and striking the imagination of the interlocutor. It has several variants, depending on the object described. It is often confused with ekphrasis, which is a realistic and precise description of a work of art.

== Definition of the figure ==
=== Etymology ===
The word "hypotyposis" comes from the ancient Greek τύπος/túpos (from which the word "type" is also descended), which refers to an "imprint in hollow or relief left by the striking of a die," specific to the vocabulary of typography. The hypotyposis, ὑποτύπωσις / hupotúpôsis, is thus a "draft, a model". Furetière sees the verb ὑποτυπόω/hupotupóô as the origin of the noun, which he paraphrases with the Latin phrase: "per figuram demonstro, designo" (i.e., "I represent, I make something see"). The seme kept in the definition of the figure is related to the spectacular side of the animation that it produces. By analogy with the matter to which it imprints a predetermined form, the imprint is indeed what marks the spirit and the imagination.

In the literal sense of the term, the hypotyposis "gives to see" (according to the Latin expression ut cerni videantur), it engraves in the reader's memory an image or an impression. The meaning of "tableau", which is used synonymously, is quite common, notably by César Chesneau Dumarsais who explains that "Hypotypose is a Greek word which means "image", "tableau"; it is when, in descriptions, one paints the facts of which one speaks as if what one says were actually before the eyes".

=== Definition and variants ===
A "figure of presence" for Chaïm Perelman and Lucie Olbrechts-Tyteca's Traité de l'argumentation, la nouvelle rhétorique, hypotyposis is, within a discourse (in writing but also to a certain extent in speech), the animated and vivid description of a subject, a scene, a real or fictitious character or an object of art. In Greek rhetoric, it is known as enargeia, or evidentia in Latin. For Jean-Jacques Robrieux, "hypotyposis (...) groups together the varied set of procedures that make a narrative or a description lively and realistic". The figure has had many names throughout history. The poet Nicolas Boileau called it "image", Fénelon "painting", Pierre Fontanier "tableau", Edmond de Goncourt "painted image" and Joachim du Bellay "energy".

By its ambition, hypotyposis is a key figure of mimesis because the author uses it to go beyond, or at least to give the illusion of, the classical narrative and descriptive framework, by giving the impression that the scene is real.

==== The prosopopeia ====
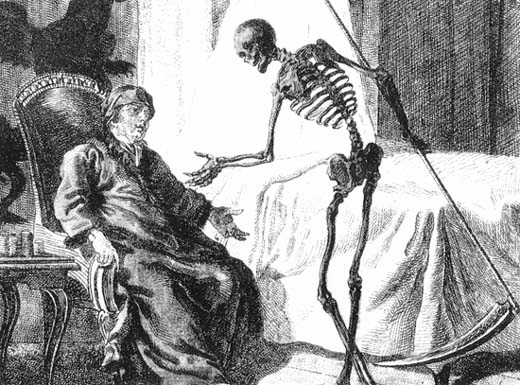
The dialogue with Death, a recurring literary theme, is a prosopopeia.

Prosopopoeia can concern a fictional, dead or abstract character who, unlike allegory [ref. needed], has the faculty of speech; it is a figure in its own right, despite its proximity to hypotyposis (according to Jean-Jacques Robrieux, it is, indeed, a form of it). The "prosopopeia of the laws" (Crito, 50 a-c) is one of the oldest examples. The term "prosopography" (ancient Greek prosopon and graphein, "face, figure, character and writing") is also often used, synonymously with that of "prosopopoeia", and designates the description of the external appearance of a person. Often confused with allegory when it concerns a mythical or abstract character (such as Death, for example), prosopography, unlike portrait and ethopoeia (see below), vividly describes the subject in his or her environment and in action, in a fleeting manner, as in this Baudelairian poem:

I am an author's pipe;

You can tell by looking at my face, Abyssinian or Cafrine,

That my master is a big smoker.

— Charles Baudelaire

==== The topography ====
Topography concerns the description of a place, real or imaginary. The object described in topography (ancient Greek topos, "the place in the sense of geographical location") is a picturesque or simply striking landscape. Its primary function is rhetorical: it takes place during the narratio (phase of the exposition of facts in oratory) where it allows situating the places and circumstances and thus allows to expose to all the places of the action or to revive their memory. The topography is very much used in the novel, to fix the scene as in this passage from the short story La Nuit by Guy de Maupassant:

I stopped under the Arc de Triomphe to look at the avenue, the long and admirable starry avenue, going towards Paris between two lines of lights, and the stars! The stars up there, the unknown stars thrown at random in the immensity where they draw these strange figures, which make one dream so much, which make one think so much.

==== The ethopoeia ====
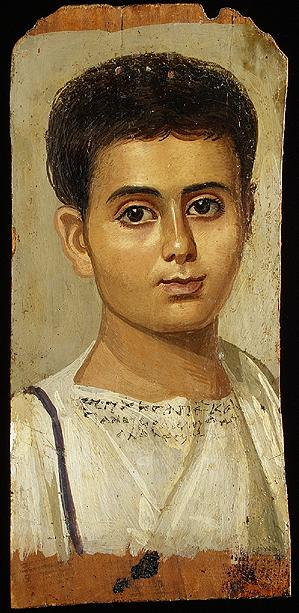
Ethopoeia provides a physical and moral portrait of a person.

Ethopoeia is also a variant of hypotyposis. It consists in painting characters or assemblies of characters by also painting their morals and passions. Less visual than the hypotyposis, it constitutes very often elements of a portrait, as with the moralists, since Les Caractères du philosophe Theophrastus, taken again by Jean de La Bruyère in 1688 in his Caractères de Theophrastus, traduits du grec, avec les Caractères ou les mœurs de ce siècle. For Marc Escola, La Bruyère's portraits achieve the excellence of ethopoeia, which he describes as "hermeneutics of the visible" as in the portrait of Drance, a character in the chapter Du Coeur of Les Caractères:

Drance wants to pass for governing his Master, who believes nothing of it, nor does the public: to speak incessantly to a Great One whom one serves, in places and at times when it is least convenient, to speak to him in his ear or in mysterious terms, to laugh until one bursts in his presence, to cut off his speech, to put oneself between him and those who speak to him, to disdain those who come to make their court, or wait impatiently for them to withdraw, to place oneself close to him in a posture that is too free, to appear with him with one's back to a fireplace, to pull him by his habit, to walk on his heels, to act as a familiar, to take liberties, all of which are more indicative of a fat man than of a favorite.

==== Diatyposis ====
Diatyposis, from a Greek term meaning the action of shaping, of modelling, or evidentia in Latin, also known as "trait", consists of a "dynamic description of an animated scene that can give rise to an oratorical development", unlike hypotyposis which remains static.

Some authors sometimes define diatyposis as a short hypotyposis. However, contrary to hypotyposis, diatyposis is a short narrative embedded in a discourse that encompasses it. In other words, the diatyposis is a digression of the gaze or of the diegesis which focuses, for a time, no longer on the unfolding of the action but on a small visualizable scene. It is often introduced by the narrator himself, by means of another figure of speech, the epiphrase, as opposed to the hypotyposis which is self-sufficient and seems closed and autonomous from the rest of the discourse (although it is a figure of speech).

Michel Pougeoise's Dictionary of Rhetoric considers diatyposis as a form of reduced and condensed hypotyposis that is found especially in the narrative, in Homer's Iliad, for example:

He struck him under the eyebrow, at the bottom of the eye, from which the pupil was torn out. And the spear, passing through the eye, passed behind the head, and Ilioneus, with his hands extended, fell. Then Penelos, drawing his sharp sword from the sheath, cut off the head, which rolled to the earth with the helmet, the strong spear still fixed in the eye.

==== A similar figure of speech: the ekphrasis ====
Historically, the figure of ekphrasis, which allows to describe in an animated way a work of art, is first in rhetoric. Indeed, the term "hypotyposis" is only attested as early as 1555 under the entry "Hipotipose" in Jacques Peletier du Mans' work, l'Art poétique, whereas ekphrasis has been known since Greek antiquity. The ekphrasis is evoked by Dionysius of Halicarnassus, in his Art rhétorique and in Sur la mimésis, but it is Aelius Theon who is the first, in the first century, to attempt a definition of it. He explains that this animated description, which he calls "ekphrasis", is "a discourse which presents in detail and puts before the eyes in an obvious way what it gives to know. There are descriptions of people, facts, places, and time (...) There are also descriptions of manner." In antiquity, ekphrasis is not limited to the evocation of works of art, but designates any vivid evocation capable of conjuring up images in the mind of the listener or the reader; it is only towards the end of the 19th century that the notion is used by scholars in a sense that restricts it to the description of works of art.

== Two types of hypotyposes ==
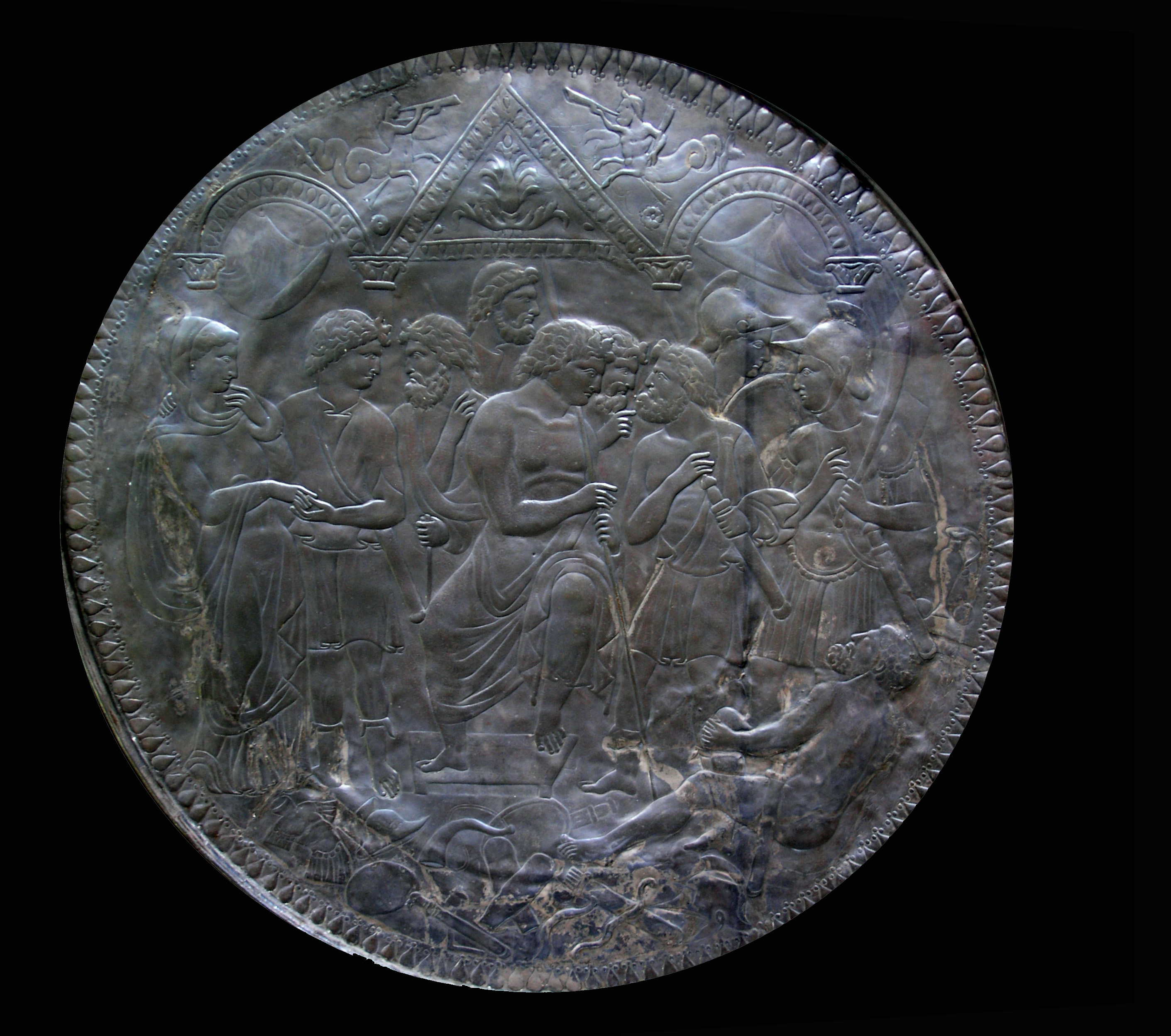
Descriptions of the shields of mythological heroes have been subjects of ekphrasis since antiquity.

In spite of its numerous variants with blurred contours, Bernard Dupriez, in his Gradus, proposes to distinguish two types of hypotyposes, a distinction also attested by Jean-Jacques Robrieux:

=== The "descriptive hypotyposis” ===
The figure then merges with simple description, as an enumeration of details, as following the gaze of the observer. Bernard Dupriez takes as an example the descriptive passage in Gustave Flaubert's L'Éducation sentimentale: "People were arriving out of breath; barrels, cables, baskets of laundry were obstructing traffic; the sailors were not responding to anyone; we were bumping into each other". The hypotyposis presses on the details, resulting in seeing the scene instead of simply reading it. These verses of Racine thus suggest, in three movements, all the sadness of the character of Junia and the love of Nero which is expressed here:

This night I saw her arrive in these places, Sad, raising to heaven his eyes wet with tears, That shone through the torches and weapons.

— Britannicus, Act II

Often the hypotyposis is revealed by the interruption of the narrative or by the creation of a digression. It is recognizable by the development of the subject it wants to show, a development that is sometimes long and typographically marked. For Dupriez, schematization is the opposition of descriptive hypotyposis. Hypotyposis consists mainly of episodes in indirect discourse, often bordering on cliché when it summarizes the action too quickly or too succinctly.

In Et que dit ce silence?, Anne Surgers, Gilles Declercq, and Anne-Elisabeth Spica analyze the visual dimension of the figure, through three categories of hypotyposis: one that gives to see and feel, a second by empathy, and a third by the accentuation of the effect of presence, in literary texts, and in painting.

=== The "rhetorical hypotyposis" ===
The rhetorical use of hypotheticals is based on the idea that they are "a device for representing the idea". In rhetoric, the visual perception is indeed first and is always privileged because it allows to strike the mind of the listener or the public, because it is linked to memory, explains Frances Yates. It thus aims at an effect or an emotion on the reader. Metonymy and metaphor are thus the fundamental figures of style composing it. As part of the rhetorical arsenal available to the orator, it intervenes in the rhetorical part of the narratio and allows the elements of the described object to be seen. It also makes it possible to situate the action, by the topography, or to make the physical portrait of an individual, by means of the prosopography. The orator then seeks to move and touch the pathos of the listeners, to convince without resorting to a logical argumentation or to evidence.

Hypotyposis is also related to the part of the rhetorical system called memoria, memory. The ancient oratorical exercises (progymnasmata) consisted in particular in the making of hypotyposes, either of works of art, or of dialogues between two famous characters but whose meeting is fictitious, for the needs of the exercise. Hypotyposis (or ekphrasis, this second term being in use at the time) is based on the reuse of truism.

== The confusion of hypotyposis with simple description ==
The theoretical and stylistic distinction between hypotyposis and conventional description remains unclear. Nevertheless, for many authors, such as Georges Molinié, the two figures are equivalent macrostructural processes. Molinié cites this verse by Victor Hugo as an illustration of the suggestive power of hypotyposis on the one hand, and its brevity on the other:

I will not look at the gold of the falling evening Nor the sails in the distance going down towards Harfleur

— Victor Hugo, "Demain dès l'aube, à l'heure où blanchit la campagne"

The collusion of the two figures is such that the Encyclopedia's article Hypotypose gives an example of allegory, citing Nicolas Boileau's lines in Le Lutrin:

Oppressed softness

In his mouth at this word feels his icy tongue;

And tired of talking, succumbing to the effort,

Sighs, stretches her arms, closes her eyes and falls asleep.

== Stylistics of hypotyposis ==
=== Literary uses of the figure ===
The hypotyposis allows to put under the eyes of the readers or spectators a picturesque scene, its effect is above all suggestive. It is indeed a question of addressing the imagination of the reader. The figure is based on what Roland Barthes calls the "effect of reality": the use of stylistic processes allows to imitate the observation of a real scene. Realist as well as romantic or even surrealist authors use it to evoke a scene and make it come alive.

Moreover, the hypotyposis establishes a relation between the outside and the inside, the nature and the feelings of the one who contemplates it, which explains its use by the poets as Charles Baudelaire and by the romantic authors then surrealists. Psychoanalysis is interested in it, insofar as it informs on the analogical mechanism, through the concepts of "regressiveness" and "contiguity".

Moreover, hypotyposis is above all a figure of speech, in that it has an argumentative aim. Olivier Reboul shows that "its persuasive force comes from the fact that it "makes see" the argument, associating pathos with logos".

Literary critics speak of a "tableau" when the hypotyposis develops over several pages, composing a very detailed painting of a single subject, perceived from all angles and in an exhaustive manner.

In stylistic technique, hypotyposis has become a notion used to identify fragmentary descriptions where only sensitive notations and striking descriptive information are rendered, in an aesthetic close to the kaleidoscope or impressionist style applied to literature. This meaning owes a lot to the cinematographic approach and to the constant mixtures between the two arts during the 20th century.

The modern linguist Henri Morier revives this original definition of hypotyposis as a vivid painting in his Dictionnaire de poétique et de rhétorique. Morier thus distinguishes hypotyposis from allegory in that the former wants to do without discourse to be perceived in itself: "even if some formal features have been repeatedly emphasized, such as the possible use of the present tense in a past tense narrative, or the absence of any mention referring to the narrator's position with respect to the theme, the main emphasis has been rather on the picturesque force of a hypotyposis, going so far as to say that it makes one see the spectacle as if there were no screen of the discourse relating it (which is linguistically ridiculous)". Morier then indicates the technique that founds the figure, which is very particular: "in that in a narrative or, even more often, in a description, the narrator selects only a part of the information corresponding to the whole of the theme, keeping only particularly sensitive and strong, catchy notations, without giving the general view of what it is about, without even indicating the global subject of the discourse, or even presenting an aspect under false expressions or of pure appearance, always attached to the cinematographic recording of the unfolding or of the exterior manifestation of the object. This fragmentary, possibly descriptive, and strongly plastic side of the text constitutes the radical component of a hypotyposis".

=== A figure of enunciation ===
According to Jean-Jacques Robrieux, hypotyposis is a figure of speech whose aim is to "provoke emotion, laughter, through an effect of reality". The enunciative framework in which it develops means that the author or the narrator invests himself in the discourse, through enunciative procedures betraying his identity. Robrieux notes the revealing use of the historical present tense of narration (for example, in this line from Jean Racine's Phèdre: "The axle cries out and breaks ..."), which makes the scene lively and contemporary to the reading. The poetic rhythm and the versification are also employed to accelerate the action. But it is above all the enunciation of the "I" of the narrator that composes the figure. Robrieux thus cites the verse 1545 of the Phèdre: "Excuse my pain..." in which Théramène delivers his emotion about his vision of Hippolytus's tragic death. In other words, as a figure of speech, hypotyposis summons above all pathos, that is its main function.

To do this, it uses a considerable number of linguistic means and stylistic or rhetorical devices: the thematic progression allows the syntagms to be linked together and makes the description more fluid, while the dislocation consists of highlighting an element (for example in: "This shield..."). The apostrophe allows the narrator to show his subjectivity by expressing his astonishment or amazement. Verbal and temporal devices such as emphasis allow the use of the imperfect tense and the simple past tense, giving an impression of vivid description. Combined with demonstrative adjectives and another deixis ("here you see...", "over there the trees were moving...") that anchor the narrative in the space-time frame, the reader thus has the illusion of seeing the object described before his eyes. The hypotyposes by the use of deixis are a specificity of Arthur Rimbaud's writing according to Dominique Combe. Stylistic processes are also used. The internal or omniscient focalisation gives an impression of almost cinematographic observation.

Finally, figures of speech contribute to create the image. The ellipsis allows to pass under detail of the events and condenses the narrative on the fact to be described. The epithets (including the "Homeric epithets") participate in creating an effect of amplified reality. Numerous other figures form the hypotyposis: figures linked to the narrator such as palinody (the narrator pretends to go back on his statements to clarify them) and epiphrase (direct intervention of the author in the discourse) in particular, but above all figures of analogy such as simile (images allow identification with known or aesthetic things), allegory (the object or situation described becomes as if it were alive), metaphor (recourse to analogies makes it possible to put forward the fantastic dimension of what is being described), personification. Finally, we can cite figures of rhythm and sentence (or verse) construction such as: gradation (the description becomes more and more precise), hyperbole (the description goes beyond all realism), antithesis (contrast effect), alliteration and assonance (in the poems especially there can be a search for imitative harmony).

== Genres concerned ==
Being a macrostructural figure, holding the truism of the description, the hypotyposis and its variants are frequently met in literature. Georges Molinié enumerates, in a non-exhaustive way, the genres of "erotica, detective stories, fantasy, in novels and in the theater, in descriptive poetry, as well as in the pathetic parts of the narration".

=== In the art of oratory ===
Historically, hypotyposis is found in argumentative statements such as forensic rhetoric, in which the aim is to capture the imagination of the listeners. It then constitutes a rhetorical truism of the narratio.

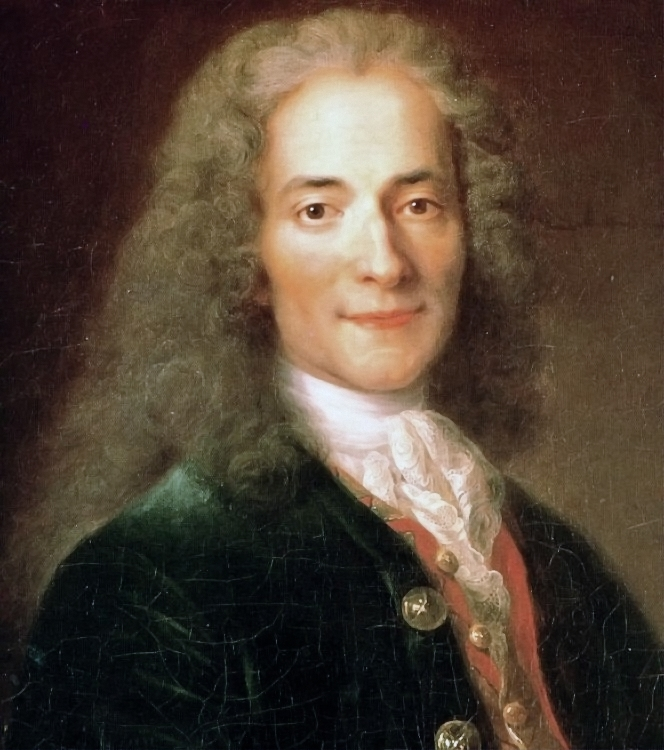
Voltaire's style paints, in a few touches, an atmosphere or a scene in a striking way.

Voltaire, for example, uses its shocking resources to make the powerful aware of the condition of the Portuguese people affected by a devastating earthquake in 1756 in his Poème sur le désastre de Lisbonne:

Deceived philosophers who shout: "All is well";

Come and contemplate these awful ruins,

These debris, these shreds, these unfortunate ashes,

These women and children piled on top of each other,

Under these broken marbles these scattered members;

Political figures are also fond of hypotyposis. They mobilize in their political discourse these descriptions with numerous metaphors and a rich vocabulary with great capacities of evocation. Indeed, this figure of the pathos, by playing with the emotions of its audience, has an argumentative effect but is also a tendency to manipulate.

=== At the theater ===
Hypotyposis is also frequently used in the theater, in descriptions, striking monologues, and reported stories. In the Classic period, it was used to help the spectator to imagine the scene, often mythological or taking place in an exotic country, or to imagine scenes considered violent and contradicting the rule of propriety, as in the works of Racine, Corneille, or Robert Garnier in Les Juives.

One of the most famous descriptive hypotyposes is that of the death of Hippolytus told by Théramène in Phèdre by Jean Racine. The one showing Ulysses relating to Clytemnestra what happened near the altar, in the presence of Calchas, in Jean Racine's Iphigénie is also often quoted. The story of Le Cid recounting the battle against the Moors uses some of the best known hypotyposes in the dramatic genre.

The evocation of the sack of Troy by Andromache in the play of the same name, by Racine, is an example of a monologue presenting a hypotyposis. The passage known as "Athalie's dream" by Racine, in the play of the same name, is finally, by the stylistic effects which emerge from it, a model of the genre:

It was during the horror of a deep night, My mother Jezebel before me showed up,

As on the day of her pompously adorned death. His misfortunes had not brought down his pride, Even she still had that borrowed glow, Of which she took care to paint & adorn her face, To repair the irreparable outrage of years. Tremble, she said to me, girl worthy of me, The cruel God of the Jews also prevails over you. I pity you for falling into his formidable hands, My daughter! As she finished these appalling words, His shadow towards my bed seemed to be dropping, And I held out my hands to kiss him; But all I found was a horrible mixture Of bruised bones and flesh dragged through the mire, Tatters full of blood, & dreadful limbs,

That devouring dogs were fighting among themselves

— Racine, Athalie, Act II, Scene 5

=== In the novel ===
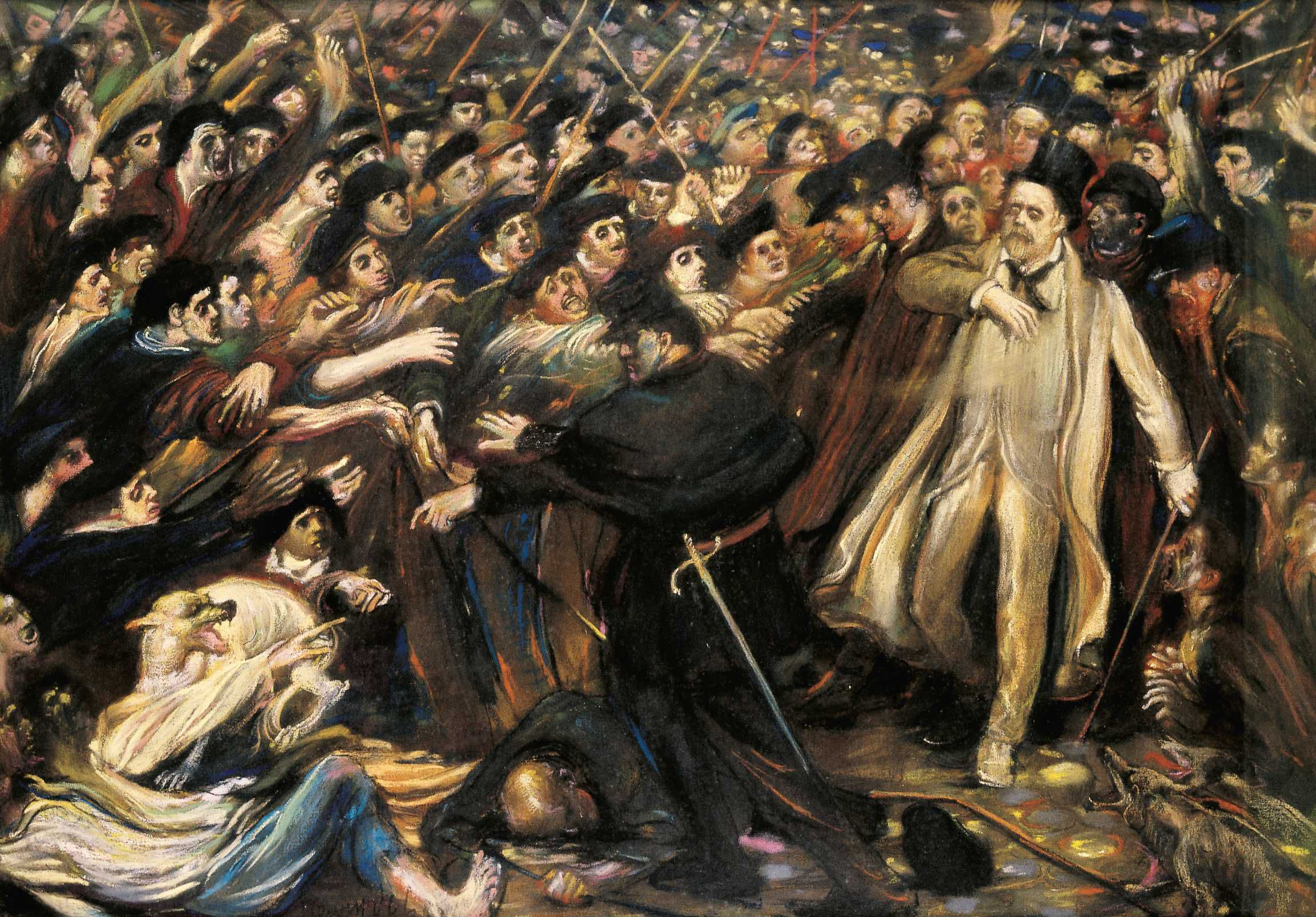
Crowds, in realistic novels, are described by means of hypotyposes.

In the novel and in particular in the literary movements like realism and naturalism, the hypotyposes are common. Developing over many sentences, they allow to accentuate the effect of reality, an aesthetic ambition of these literary movements. The description of the alembic by Émile Zola in L'Assommoir, of the mine in Germinal; the descriptive stretches of Gustave Flaubert or Joris-Karl Huysmans, of Honoré de Balzac finally form types of hypotyposes anchored in the natural course of the narrative.

Émile Zola in his Carnets ethnographiques (Ethnographic Notebooks) makes a topography of the caves of Lourdes: "[in the baths of the cave of Lourdes] there was everything, threads of blood, scraps of skin, scabs, pieces of lint and bandage, a dreadful consummate of all the evils, all the wounds, all the rottenness. It seemed a veritable culture of poisonous germs, an essence of the most dreadful contagions, and the miracle should be that one emerged alive from this human slime."

Stendhal in particular knows not only how to constitute hypotyposes, but also how to play on their referential scope. In La Chartreuse de Parme (1839), Fabrice the hero contemplates the battle of Waterloo, which the author presents in great military detail and precise description: "a ploughed land that was stirred up in a singular way. The bottom of the furrows was full of water, and the very wet earth that formed the crest of these furrows flew in small black fragments thrown three or four feet high". Stendhal then presents his character as asking a passing soldier "but is this a real battle?", thereby criticizing the literary attempt to portray everything in a spectacular way, at the risk of no longer being able to identify the fictional from the real.

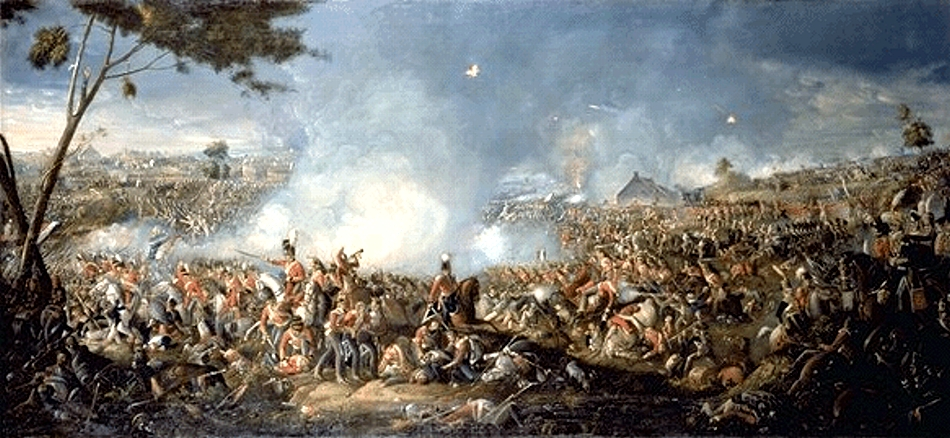
The battle scenes, privileged theme of the hypotyposis.

In the 20th century, Alain Robbe-Grillet in Les Gommes uses modern hypotypositions to describe a tomato in an exhaustive way. Marguerite Duras' Le Ravissement de Lol V. Stein is considered a hypotyposis on the scale of an entire novel. Annie Ernaux, who claims in La Place a "flat writing", devoid of any literary art, to "immerse herself in the vision and the limits of the world of [her] father" of peasant origin, uses the hypotyposis abundantly to "make the image of the father appear" in an "ethnological" writing, where the details are always chosen according to their social significance:

"I will gather the words, the gestures, the tastes of my father, the highlights of his life, all the objective signs of an existence that I also shared."

Surrealism also, by means of the splitting up of objects into fugitive details, has updated the hypotyposis while maintaining the classical use of scenographic tableaux, inherited notably from Lautréamont and his Les Chants de Maldoror.

As a return to its phantasmatic and hallucinatory origin, the poets of modernity, with the use of drugs and practices of writing based on the de-construction, as Henri Michaux establishes hypotyposes delivered of any space of reference:

Suddenly, but first preceded by a word in vanguard...

Hymalayas suddenly appear...

While I am still looking at these extraordinary mountains, here is that...

Plowshares and again the big scythes that mow the nothingness from top to bottom...

— Henri Michaux, Misérable Miracle

Paul Claudel composes mystical and pantheistic hypotyposes. The passage known as Place Monge in Claude Simon's novel Le Jardin des Plantes presents an original hypotyposis inspired by cinematographic techniques.

=== In poetry ===
Charles Baudelaire but also Arthur Rimbaud in his Illuminations animates their poems by hypotyposes establishing contemplative effects for this one. Baudelaire uses them to give substance to synesthesia, which he calls "correspondences". The Japanese haikus are also fast hypotyposes.

Literary and pictorial romanticism employs hypotyposes based mainly on another figure of speech: allegory (in this case liberty).

Victor Hugo in his romantic poems uses many emphatic hypotyposes, signs of his energetic writing:

The child was shot twice in the head. The house was clean, humble, peaceful, honest;

A blessed branch was seen on a portrait. An old grandmother was there crying. We undressed him in silence. His mouth, Pale, opened; death drowned his fierce eye; Her arms seemed to be hanging down, asking for support. He had a boxwood top in his pocket. You could stick a finger in the holes of his wounds. Have you seen the blackberry bleeding in the hedges? His skull was open like wood splitting. The grandmother watched the child undress, Saying: – How white it is! bring the lamp closer.

God! her poor hair is stuck on her temple!

— Victor Hugo, Souvenir de la nuit du 4

=== In the other arts ===
Cinema often employs hypotyposes. Populated scenes, animated by sweeping camera movements, but also descriptions by the camera eye of artistic objects in the film, as in John Huston's The Maltese Falcon, are called "tableaux vivants" in film. D. W. Griffith, for example, uses these tableaux vivants to highlight dramatic moments in the film A Corner in Wheat. Derek Jarman also uses this technique, as does Peter Greenaway. Jean-Luc Godard, in collaboration with Jean-Pierre Gorin, in 1972, made a painting of a factory in his film Tout Va Bien.

Painting, especially classical painting, has produced many hypotyposes, often inspired by dramatic or tragic plays such as Phèdre or Athalie.

Realist painting also, in its aesthetic ambition to describe everything, was able to form detailed hypotyposes on popular scenes as in Gustave Courbet. Already Denis Diderot, art critic, examined the hypotyposes in the paintings of his time, and made them the condition of a good painting and of a mastered style.

In music, hypotyposes constitute symphonies, vast musical tableaux attempting to portray scenes that are often mythological or dramatic, as in Richard Wagner's work. Wagner also defines his theory of "Gesamtkunstwerk" as an animated and dynamic description, made possible by the fusion of all the Arts on stage, linked by musical composition, close to the literary hypotyposis as an exhaustive representation of an aesthetic subject. Wagnerian operas such as Tristan and Isolde (Tristan und Isolde), often considered as his masterpiece, but also The Master Singers of Nuremberg (Die Meistersinger von Nürnberg) and The Ring of the Nibelungs (Der Ring des Nibelungen), which is a set of four operas inspired by German and Scandinavian mythologies, and finally Parsifal, a contemplative work taken from the Christian legend of the Holy Grail, form living pictures.

=== Related figures ===
Mother figure	Daughter figure
description and amplification	diatyposis, ethopoeia and prosopopeia
Antonym or paronym	Synonym
schematization	animated description of a scene, tableau (for a set of scenes), portrait (for a real or fictional character), topography (for a place) and ekphrasis (for a work of art)

== Bibliography ==
- Quintilien (1989). Institutions oratoires. Bude Serie Latine (in French). Vol. 1. Translated by Cousin, Jean. Paris: Les Belles Lettres. ISBN 2-251-01202-8.
- Bacry, Patrick (1992). Les Figures de style et autres procédés stylistiques. Collection Sujets (in French). Paris: Armand Colin. ISBN 2-7011-1393-8.
- Barthes, Roland (1968). "L'Effet de réel". Communications (in French). 11 (11): 84–89. doi:10.3406/comm.1968.1158.
- Chesneau Dumarsais, César (1730). Des tropes ou Des différents sens dans lesquels on peut prendre un même mot dans une même langue. Paris.
- Dupriez, Bernard. Gradus, les procédés littéraires.
- Meyer, Michel (1999). Histoire de la Rhétorique des Grecs à nos jours. Biblio-Essais (in French). Paris: Le Livre de Poche. ISBN 978-2-253-94283-2.
- Molinié, Georges; Aquien, Michèle (1996). Dictionnaire de rhétorique et de poétique. Encyclopédies d'aujourd'hui. Paris: LGF - Livre de Poche. ISBN 2-253-13017-6.
- Morier, Henri (1998). Dictionnaire de poétique et de rhétorique. Grands Dictionnaires (in French). Paris: Presses Universitaires Françaises. ISBN 2-13-049310-6.
- Lamy, Bernard; Timmermans, Benoît (1998). La Rhétorique ou l'art de parler. Interrogation Philosophique (in French). Paris: Presses Universitaires Françaises. ISBN 2-13-049541-9.
- Reboul, Olivier (2009). Introduction à la rhétorique. Premier cycle (in French). Vol. 4. Paris: Presses Universitaires de France. ISBN 978-2-13-043917-2.
- Robrieux, Jean-Jacques (1993). Éléments de rhétorique et d'argumentation (in French). Paris: Dunod. ISBN 2-10-001480-3.
- Delarue, F (1980). Suétone et l'hypotypose (in French). Paris: Revue Lalies. ISSN 0750-9170.
- Combel, V (1995). L'hypotypose dans la tragédie de Racine (in French). Vol. 188. xviie Siècle. ISBN 9782130555223.
- Masuy, Christine (1997). "Description et hypotypose dans l'écriture journalistique de l'ambiance". Pratiques. 94. Pratiques : théorie, pratique: 35–48. doi:10.3406/prati.1997.1802. ISSN 0338-2389.
- Le Bozec, Yves (2002). L'hypotypose : un essai de définition formelle. Vol. 92. L'information grammaticale. ISSN 0222-9838.
- Le Bozec, Yves (2004). Les frontières de l'hypotypose. Le songe d'Athalie et la prophétie de Joad (in French). Vol. 100. ISSN 0222-9838.
- Esteves, A (2001). Evidentia rhétorique et horreur infernale : le portrait de Tisiphone chez Stace, étude esthétique et stylistique, Thébaïde (in French). Paris: Bulletin de l'Association Guillaume Budé. ISSN 0004-5527.
