= Cambridge Greek Play =

Ancient Greek-language play series

The Cambridge Greek Play is a play performed in Ancient Greek by students and alumni of the University of Cambridge, England. The event is held once every three years and is a tradition which started in 1882 with the Ajax of Sophocles.

The history of the early years may be found in P. E. Easterling's The Early Years of the Cambridge Greek Play: 1883–1912.

Among famous names involved in those early days were Rupert Brooke as the Herald in Aeschylus' Eumenides (1906), Sir Hubert Parry as the composer of incidental music to Aristophanes' The Birds (1883) – the Bridal March is still used in weddings – and Ralph Vaughan Williams as composer of incidental music to The Wasps, also by Aristophanes (1909). More recently, actor Tom Hiddleston played Orestes in Sophocles' Electra in 2001.

The Cambridge Greek Play is now hosted by the Cambridge Arts Theatre.

== Recent performance history ==
- Ion by Euripides (2026)
- The Persians by Aeschylus and Cyclops by Euripides (2022)
- Oedipus at Colonus by Sophocles (2019)
- Antigone by Sophocles and Lysistrata by Aristophanes (2016)
- Prometheus Bound attributed to Aeschylus and Frogs by Aristophanes (2013)
- Agamemnon by Aeschylus (2010)
- Medea by Euripides(2007)
- Oedipus the King by Sophocles (2004)
- Electra by Sophocles (2001)
- The Trojan Women by Euripides (1998)

== See also ==
- Oxford Classical Drama Society
- The Wasps (Vaughan Williams)
- Bradfield College#The Greek play
