= OCDS =

OCDS may refer to:

- Oxford Classical Drama Society, the funding body behind the triennial Oxford Greek Play
- Secular Order of Discalced Carmelites (Ordo Carmelitarum Discalceatorum Saecularis)
- Open Contracting Data Standard, a data standard for public contracting/tendering/procurement
