= Rosemary Morris =

Rosemary Morris may refer to:

- Rosemary Morris (water polo)
- Rosemary Morris (historian)
