= Progymnasmata =

Exercises in rhetoric

Progymnasmata (Ancient Greek: προγυμνάσματα, romanized: progumnasmáta, lit. 'fore-exercises'; singular προγύμνασμα, progúmnasma; Latin: praeexercitamina) are a series of preliminary rhetorical exercises that began in ancient Greece and continued during the Roman Empire. These exercises were implemented by students of rhetoric, who began their schooling between ages twelve and fifteen. The purpose of these exercises was to prepare students for writing declamations after they had completed their education with the grammarians. There are only four surviving handbooks of progymnasmata, attributed to Aelius Theon, Hermogenes of Tarsus, Aphthonius of Antioch, and Nicolaus the Sophist.

== History ==
Composition was not a primary subject taught in schools until the fifth century B.C. In fact, the term “progymnasmata” first appeared in Chapter 28 of Rhetoric to Alexander, most likely written by Anaximenes of Lampsacus in the late fourth century. This work is preserved alongside those of Aristotle, yet he never mentions the use of preliminary exercises. But Aristotle does touch on the rhetorical forms, which became an aspect within the nature of progymnasmata. The use of preliminary rhetorical exercises is discussed briefly in some Greek and Roman dialogues, but all handbooks from that time remain lost today. There are only four known surviving handbooks of progymnasmata. The earliest one is that of Theon, written some time during the first century A.D. In his introduction, Theon addresses teachers rather than students and criticizes students who skip out on these preliminary exercises. The second handbook is attributed to one of the most influential rhetoricians of the second century, Hemogenes of Tarsus. But there is no preface to his work and the exercises are brief; therefore, many doubt its authenticity. But the third handbook is attributed to Aphthonius of Antioch, student of the great sophist Libanius during the second half of the fourth century. This is the most widely used and referenced handbook that became the standard on the practice of progymnasmata. His treatises were combined with rhetorical treatises of Hermogenes on stasis theory and style to create the “Hermogenic Corpus.” The final handbook is attributed to Nicolaus of Myra, who taught rhetoric in Constantinople during the late fifth century.

== Progymnasmata of Aphthonius ==
Although the exercises expressed in each known handbook are very similar, there are several minor variations between them. But because the work of Aphthonius is the one most widely recognized and practiced, these variations are often unrecognized. All students were asked to write out each assignment, memorize it, and then perform a class oration. The progymnasmata were taught in order, increasing in difficulty as the course advances. The courses were organized to begin with story-telling and end with making an argument. There was a focus on literature as a supplement to the course, paying close attention to models of rhetoric and literature. The progymnasmata of Aphthonius was first translated to Latin in the fifteenth century by Rudolphus Agricola.

=== Fable (mythos) ===
Aesop's fables were popular at the time rhetoric became a common topic of study. There are three forms of fable: the rational form (where characters are men and women), the ethical form (where animals are protagonists), and a third form involving both. What all three have in common is they each have a moral, stated before the story begins or after it has concluded. In Aphthonius's handbook, the first exercise was to create a fable that followed the three forms.

=== Narrative (diēgēma) ===
This elementary assignment was to simply write a narrative (not to be confused with fable). It is assumed that this training is a result of Aristotle's theory of categories and introduces students to the four values of narrative, which are perspicuity, incisiveness, persuasiveness, and purity of language. The content of the narrative exercise in the progymnasmata is either political, historical, or based on fiction. Just as diegesis indicates the narrative plot of a film, the so-called narrative of a speech or oration moves the content forth.

=== Anecdote (chreia) ===
Students were asked to take an action or saying of a famous person and elaborate on it. They were to develop the meanings of these actions or quotations with the framing under the headings of praise, paraphrase, cause, example of meaning, compare and contrast, testimonies, and an epilogue.

=== Maxim (gnōmē) ===
Maxim or proverbs were first described by Aristotle, and in Aphthonius's book are divided into protreptic, apotreptic, declarative, simple, and compound. A moral generalization was given to students about a writer, and they were asked to create something similar to an anecdote about the writer.

=== Refutation (anaskeuē) ===
This exercise required the student to logically reason against something drawn from myths, narratives, or fables. The student's argument was that something was either impossible, illogical, unsuitable, or inexpedient.

=== Confirmation (kataskeuē) ===
The confirmation exercise is the opposite of refutation. The student was asked to reason in favor of something drawn from legends and literature.

=== Commonplace (koinos topos) ===
Working out the commonplace involved attacking vice by envisioning criticism of stereotypes rather than individuals. Students do this by using contradiction, comparison, and maxim attacking the motivation of the demographic described.

=== Encomium (enkōmion) ===
Students used encomium to praise persons, things, times, places, animals, and growing things. Each praise could be engendered from the headings upbringing, deeds, skills, and sometimes was in the form of a comparison with another person, an epilogue, or a prayer.

=== Invective (psogos) ===
Invective opposes commonplace. It attacks a specific, named individual, usually a political or cultural figure.

=== Comparison (synkrisis) ===
The comparison exercise acts as a double encomium or a combination of an encomium of one person or thing and the invective against another.

=== Personification (ēthopoeia) ===
Students used personification or ethopoeia by forming a speech ascribed to the ghost of a known person or of an imaginary or mythological character from past, present, or future times. This exercise was intended to request students to perform it with clarity, conciseness, and floridity.

=== Description (ekphrasis) ===
When asked to use ekphrasis to describe a person, place, thing, or time, students were obliged to produce a description that was complete. Included was detailed information about a person from head-to-toe, an action from start to finish, etc. This form is seen in many classical literature and historical writings.

=== Argument (thesis) ===
Because this exercise is an introduction to argument in the philosophical schools, the use of thesis was not performed until first completing all previous exercises. Students had to come up with a thesis argument of their own nature; these questions were often ones difficult to answer.

=== Introduction to law (nomou eisphora) ===
Aphtonius calls this final exercise a gymnasia rather than progymnasmata. This exercise is in the form of advocacy of a proposed law or opposition of it. The argument is first stated, a counterargument follows, and then the headings are discussed

== Progymnasmata for schools ==
In the past few years there has been considerable effort expended to see if the Progymnasmata could be adapted for use in elementary, middle and high school education.
