= Topothesia =

Topothesia is "the description of an imaginable or non-existent place". It has been classified as a type of enargia (a synonym to "hypotyposis"), which is a "generic name for a group of figures aiming at vivid, lively description". Edgar Allan Poe used enargia frequently to describe his characters in his literary works. According to Philip Hardie, a professor at the University of Cambridge, its determining characteristic is its position within a text. Normally, when the descriptive analysis of a place is found to discontinue a narrative, this interrupting section can be considered topothesia. In addition, it has a stereotyped entry formula that facilitates distinguishing the narrative from the descriptive. In most famous texts, topothesia begins with est locus ("there is a place" in Latin), as can be seen in Metamorphoses by Ovid.

== Etymology ==
Topothesia is derived from a mixture of two Greek words: "topos" (τοπος), which literally translated means "place", and the suffix "-thesia", which is obtained from the noun "thesis", meaning "setting forth". In ancient Greek the word always seems to refer to the description or arrangement of a real place, while the application of the word to an imaginary description (as opposed to "topographia", the description of a real place) is first found in the Latin commentator Servius.

== Examples ==
Topothesia is a tool often used in poetry rather than by orators. A renowned poet who frequently utilized topothesia along with other forms of enargia was Edgar Allan Poe. A popular poem that featured various examples of topothesia is "Dreamland".

By a route obscure and lonely,
Haunted by ill angels only,
Where an Eidolon, named Night,
On a black throne reigns upright,
I have reached these lands but newly
From an ultimate dim Thule-
From a wild clime that lieth, sublime,
Out of Space – Out of Time.

Bottomless vales and boundless floods,
And chasms, and caves, and Titan woods,
With forms that no man can discover
For the tears that drip all over;
Mountains toppling evermore
Into seas without a shore;
Seas that restlessly aspire,
Surging, unto skies of fire;
Lakes that endlessly outspread
Their lone waters- lone and dead,-
Their still waters- still and chilly
With the snows of the lolling lily. (“Dream-Land,” 7:89)

However, this rhetorical device is apparent in other of Poe's works of fiction like "The Domain of Arnheim". This short story was recognized for its repeated use of topothesia. According to author and professor at York University, Brett Zimmerman, "the tale’s entire second half is a description of Arnheim, an artificial paradise on Earth – 'the phantom handiwork, conjointly, of the Sylphs, of the Fairies, of the Genii, and of the Gnomes' (6: 196). We also have 'Landor’s Cottage: A Pendant to "The Domain of Arnheim".' That piece really has no plot; it is extended topothesia – an exercise in picturesque description of a place…"
