= Emura =

Japanese manga artist

Emura 絵夢羅
- Born: March 19, 1978 (age 48) Kanagawa Prefecture, Japan
- Areas: Character design, Writer, Manga artist
- Notable works: W Juliet
- Awards: Outstanding Debut - W Juliet

Emura (絵夢羅) (born March 19, 1978) is a Japanese manga artist born in Kanagawa Prefecture, Japan. She is best known for her series W Juliet. She made her professional debut in 1994 in Hana to Yume.

== Works ==
- Nana-iro no Shinwa
- W Juliet
- Michibata no Tenshi
- Gokuraku Dōmei
- W Juliet II
- Grand Sun
- Kyō mo Ashita mo
