= Chreia =

Antique and Byzantine genre

The chreia or chria (Greek: χρεία) was, in antiquity and the Byzantine Empire, both a genre of literature and one of the progymnasmata.

== Definition ==
A chreia was a brief, useful (χρεία means "use") anecdote about a particular character. That is, a chreia was shorter than a narration—often as short as a single sentence—but unlike a maxim, it was attributed to a character. Usually it conformed to one of a few patterns, the most common being "On seeing..." (ιδών or cum vidisset), "On being asked..." (ἐρωτηθείς or interrogatus), and "He said..." (ἔφη or dixit). This is similar to the use of koans by Zen Buddhists.

== Examples ==
The following chreia, the most common in ancient sources, is illustrative:

μικταὶ δὲ αἱ μῖξιν ἔχουσαι λόγου καὶ πράξεως, οἷον 'Διογένης ἰδὼν μειράκιον ἀτακτοῦν τὸν παιδαγωγὸν ἐτύπτησε λέγων· τί γὰρ τοιαῦτα ἐπαίδευες;'

On another hand, ‹chreiai› that contain a mixture of theory and practice are mixed, such as 'Diogenes, on seeing a youth misbehaving, struck his paedagogus, adding "Why do you teach such things?"'

— Ps.-Hermogenes, Progymnasmata, 3, 9-11 Rabe

Chreiai could be silly:

Olympias, on hearing that her son Alexander was proclaiming himself the offspring of Zeus, said "Won't this fellow stop slandering me to Hera?"

Or solemn

A Laconian, who had become a prisoner of war and was being sold, on being asked by someone what he (the Laconian) could do, answered, "Be free."

Wise:

Aristeides, on being asked what justice is, said: "Not desiring the possessions of others."

Or witty:

Diogenes, on being asked why people give to beggars but not to philosophers, said: "Because they suppose they might become lame and blind but they never suppose they might take up philosophy."

Or all of these:

Socrates the philosopher, when a certain student named Apollodorus said to him, "The Athenians have unjustly condemned you to death," responded with a laugh, "But did you want them to do it justly?"

As a literary genre the chreia was a subject of collection. Scholars such as Plutarch or Seneca kept their own private collections of chreiai. Published collections were also available. The chreia is primarily known, however, for its role in education. Students were introduced to simple chreiai almost as soon as they could read. Later they practiced the complex grammar of Greek by putting these chreiai through changes of voice and tense. As one of the last stages in their preparation for rhetoric—this is where chreiai serve as one of the progymnasmata—they would elaborate the theme of a chreiai into a formal eight-paragraph essay. The student would praise, paraphrase, explain, contrast, compare, provide an example, make a judgment, and, in conclusion, exhort the reader.

Chreiai are also common in the New Testament, mainly in the Gospels. An example is:

And as he went out of the temple, one of his disciples saith unto him, Master, see what manner of stones and what buildings are here! And Jesus answering said unto him, Seest thou these great buildings? there shall not be left one stone upon another, that shall not be thrown down.

— Mark, 13:1-2 (KJV)

This famous passage in Luke also has the typical structure of a chreia, though its length is somewhat unusual:

And they asked him, saying, Master, we know that thou sayest and teachest rightly, neither acceptest thou the person of any, but teachest the way of God truly: Is it lawful for us to give tribute unto Caesar, or no? But he perceived their craftiness, and said unto them, Why tempt ye me? Shew me a penny. Whose image and superscription hath it? They answered and said, Caesar's. And he said unto them, Render therefore unto Caesar the things which be Caesar's, and unto God the things which be God's.

— Luke, 20:21-25 (KJV)
