= Epiphrase =

Figure of speech or rhetorical figure

"No, I swear, I'm not telling you this to flatter you, you have a true friend like no other. I will tell you that if you don't know it, you are the only one. Mme Verdurin was telling me this again on the last day (you know, on the eve of departure we talk better)", Marcel Proust, Du côté de chez Swann.

An epiphrase (meaning "what it is said in addition", from ancient Greek ἐπί/epí "in addition" and φράσις/phrásis "phrase") is a figure of speech that consists of joining one or more sentence segments to the end of a syntactically completed sentence or group as a conclusion or to emphasize a fact.

The epiphrase can be used in two ways. It can indeed be used to add a word to an already finished speech or can allow the author to include a personal comment in their speech. Identifying it can be difficult as it is like other figures such as the epiphonema, the parenthesis, or the hyperbaton.

Its stylistic resources can be an idea or word amplification, a feeling or reflection highlighting, and the effect of distance or on the contrary of approaching the reader, with an often comic or humorous intention.

== Identification ==
=== Etymology ===
The "epiphrase" is a neologism with two Greek roots: ἐπί/epí which means "in addition", and φράσις/phrásis which means "phrase". For the grammar professor and linguist Patrick Bacry, it is literally "what it is said in addition" (there is a related Greek verb ἐπιφράζειν/epiphrázein that means "to say furthermore") or 'added explanation". He also points out that the word "epiphrase" is "not widely used".

=== Definition ===
The Dictionnaire de la langue française by Émile Littré defines epiphrase as a figure of speech in which "one or more words are added to a phrase that seemed finished in order to develop more ideas".

According to the linguist and stylist Bernard Dupriez, the epiphrase is part of a phrase that is added specially to indicate the author or character's feelings as in this example from the novel Le Curé de Cucugnan by Alphonse Daudet:

"Tomorrow, Monday, I will confess the old men and women. It's nothing. Tuesday, the children. I'll be done soon."

For Pierre Fontanier, an eighteenth-century grammarian, the epiphrase is synonymous with "addition" and is merely a kind of hyperbaton. According to him, it is more precisely a half-parabasis that takes the form of parentheses or an incidental proposition, or even an incidental in a parenthesis. This example from Henry de Montherlant (Les Célibataires) shows that the epiphrase can indeed be added to the typographical parenthesis:

"The expression on Mr. Octave's face when he saw smoke (cigarette smoke) in his room (his room...), and ashes on his carpet (his carpet...), was worthy of the theater."

For the French academic and specialist in stylistics Henri Suhamy, the epiphrase is almost synonymous with epiphonemas (the addition of an often sententious statement to a textual whole that seems to be finished) and paremboles (a proposition inserted into a speech to express the personal point of view of the author or narrator), especially when it designates "indignant exclamations, moralistic reflections, conclusions and general ideas with which orators or fictitious characters comment on their own speeches". As an example, Suhamy quotes the words of Ferrante, a character in Henry de Montherlant's tragedy La Reine Morte:

"I forgive you. But how vain is forgiveness!"

Patrick Bacry talks about a quick author's comment, in a few words, in the form of parentheses, about what he is evoking, as in this sentence by Alexandre Dumas in which the epífrase is marked using an incise:

"Their fortune was otherwise made, not their fortune with the king, but their position assured."

Patrick Bacry points out that the figure also designates a "development, always terminative and as if added to an idea on which the sentence, the narrative, the discourse seemed to have to end." He quotes Ronsard in his Discours:

They broke my dress by breaking my cities,

Making my citizens despise me, Have plundered my hair by pillaging my churches,

My churches, alas! that by force they took,

In powder, smashing images and altars,

Venerable residence of our immortal saints.

— Pierre de Ronsard, Discours des misères de ce temps

The sentence, which gave the impression of ending with the third verse, continues in a "sort of final rebound that constitutes the epiphrase."

Georges Molinié, a specialist in French stylistics, considers that the epiphrase is formed when the added utterance is "thematically and syntactically attached to what precedes", by means of a linguistic index such as an anaphoric for example. However, the figure only serves to flesh out the discourse.

The epiphrase exists in most other languages, as here in German, with a line from Friedrich von Schiller's play Guillaume Tell:

"Mein Retter seid Ihr und mein Engel."

("You are my savior and my angel.")

=== The difference with the epiphonema ===
Etymologically, the figure designates an "added word", close to the epiphonema, but it differs from it by the fact that it adds a brief comment to the discourse. Moreover, if the epiphrase is removed, the discourse does not lose any raw information, as in this sentence by Marcel Proust:

"Mrs. Verdurin was still telling me this on the last day (you know, on the eve of departure we talk better)."

Michèle Aquien and Georges Molinié classify the epiphrase as a macrostructural figure: it concerns a discourse often considered complete, but which is enriched by a thought, forming the epiphrase, "which could well be produced elsewhere or on its own but which in this case forms a development welded to the articulation of the reasoning in the text." Moreover, the removal of the epiphrase "would distort the argument". It is this non-removable feature that distinguishes the epiphrase from the epiphonema, which is an added but syntactically and semantically optional word. Michèle Aquien and Georges Molinié cite this aphorism of Saint-Just as an example:

"You wanted a Republic; if you did not want at the same time what constitutes it, it would bury the people under its debris. What constitutes a Republic is the destruction of that which is opposed to it."

The last sentence could be uttered on its own or in contexts other than the quoted speech. However, if it is removed from this passage, Saint-Just's argument becomes flawed.

The difference can also be semantic: according to Jean-Jacques Robrieux, epiphonemas are distinguished from epiphrases because the former figure is intended to evoke a thought more generally and sententiously, as at this end of a fragment of Pascal's Pensées, where the figurative effect is reinforced using typographical parentheses:

"(How hollow and full of garbage is the heart of man!)"

=== Hyperbaton and epiphrase ===
The epiphrase is considered by the Group μ in its General Rhetoric as proceeding from linguistic permutation, not from addition. In this sense, the epiphrase is only a hyperbaton, like the anastrophe or the tmesis. The Group μ quotes this line from Jules Laforgue:

"He was beautiful, wasn't he, Narcissus? And distinguished!"

== Two purposes ==
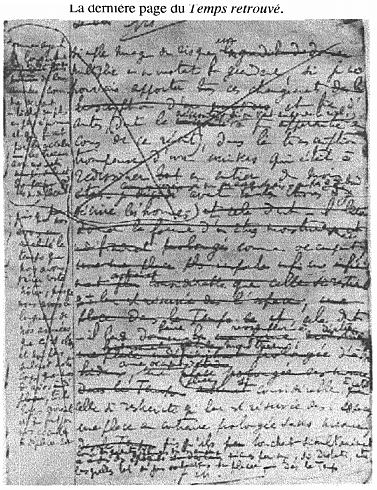
The interruption of the narrative by the personal comments of the author participates in a particular poetics, which determines even the explanatory and moralist genre according to Gérard Genette.

The epiphrase is a figure of speech with two purposes; it can be either a brief comment, in the form of an incise, by an author about the idea he is developing, or an addition at the end of a speech, which allows the development of a final idea.

=== Adding words ===
The epiphrase has a general value of digression in the sense that it is an added and terminating development of a previously developed idea to which one returns to insist, put forward by the narrator; it is then close to palinody, which consists in returning to words, to contradict oneself voluntarily.

Like all the incises of the author, or of the narrator, in the development of the plot, the epiphrase is often a specific mark of enunciation. There is indeed an epiphrase when the author intervenes in his work by means of comments inserted in the discourse, points out the literary critic and theorist Gérard Genette, for whom it is, in fact, close to the parenthesis, of which it is considered a variant:

For who avenges his father, there is no forfeit, And it is to sell one's blood to surrender to kindness.

— Corneille, Cinna, Act I, scene 2

In this sense, it always marks the opinion of the enunciator and can constitute a disjunct. For example, Voltaire ends his portrait of the Duke of Guise, in La Henriade, with an accusatory epiphrase:

He formed in Paris this disastrous League

Which soon infected all the rest of France; A dreadful monster that fed the people and the great,

Fertilized with carnage and fertile with tyrants.

The nota bene, rejected in the paratext, is like an epiphrase for Bernard Dupriez because it is directed toward the reader.

=== Author's comment ===
Gérard Genette, in Figures II (chapter " Vraisemblance et motivation "), sees in the epiphrase the privileged mode of appearance of the author within his work, the one by which he can address his reader. The word is thus extracted from the discursive framework to concern the reader, as in a tête-à-tête. In this case, the figure concerns only the author and no longer the narrator. In Figure III, Genette argues that epiphrase is constitutive of the explanatory and moralist genre. He makes the figure the notion designating any intervention of the auctorial discourse in the narrative and considers that the name of "epiphonema" has become "inconvenient" to designate this phenomenon.

Bernard Dupriez notes that the epode of Greek poetry, sometimes satirical, is close to the epiphrase.

This commentary, which takes the place of parenthesis, is often placed at the end of a speech or a narrative and has the function of expressing a feeling or an opinion, in an exclamatory manner, according to Jean-Jacques Robrieux. The epiphrase adds a comment from the author, who wants to specify a particular point or to deliver a feeling or an idea, as in this extract from The Reveries of the Solitary Walker by Jean-Jacques Rousseau:

"I should have counted on this metamorphosis in advance, but so many strange circumstances were attached to it; so many obscure remarks and reticences accompanied it; I was told about it with air so laughably discreet that all these mysteries worried me. I have always hated darkness; it naturally inspires in me a horror that those with which I have been surrounded for so many years have not diminished."

Jean-Jacques Robrieux considers that the epiphrase is a figure of speech used in rhetoric to "deviate" from the subject. Close to the parenthesis, it allows the author to present his feelings with emphasis, as in this example:

"Tomorrow I'll have finished this tedious work. It's about time! I'll finally be able to go on vacation. And it's deserved!"

== Stylistic use ==
Pierre Macherey notes that the epiphrases in Honoré de Balzac's work, which he calls "separable statements", are an integral part of the novelistic text and participate fully in its stylistics: "These separable statements are not separate statements: they are in work not as true statements, but as novelistic objects; they are there the term of a designation, of a monstration; their status, in spite of the appearances, is not directly ideological: the mode of their presence is that of a presentation which digs them, exhibits in them a fundamental disparity. Thus, they are not in the text as intruders, but as effects: they have meaning only by the metamorphosis that makes them elements among others of the process of novelistic production."

By creating an epiphrase, the author allows for a break in tone, an effect of distance or, on the contrary, a rapprochement towards the reader, often with a comic or humorous intention as in this passage from Hector Berlioz in which "the memoirist intervenes directly to break the spell of his style himself":

"For this glorious day, the academicians put on their beautiful green embroidered garments; they shine, they dazzle. They are going to crown in pomp, a painter, a sculptor, an architect, an engraver and a musician. Great is the joy in the gynaecium of the muses. What have I just written there?... it looks like a verse."

In the short story L'Amour impossible, Jules Barbey d'Aurevilly questions his own writing practice through numerous epiphrases:

"The impression that I kept from it, it is that there is in all this book enough the instinct of the nuances and some big features which announce the width of the touch for later; – of the remainder, the style without natural [... A style made of oyster shells, so overloaded with different layers of ideas that it would take punctuation made on purpose to unravel it [...] the truth is that there are too many incidences to my sentence, too many intersecting insights, harming the march of thought and the clarity of expression."

The epiphrase, by "its massive use, tends here to provoke a certain "18th effect" which is one of the characteristics of L'Amour impossible". Norbert Dodille speaks of a "poetics of the epiphrase", specific to the genre of the essay, and functioning as "interweaving of insights".

== Rhetorical use ==
The epiphrase can also have a rhetorical use, in the framework of an argument. Thus, explains José Domingues de Almeida, Michel Houellebecq's novel The Elementary Particles resorts to "this mechanism by which the author makes the characters say his points of view without "getting wet" too much, but being sure of the effect caused on his readership, of the damage caused behind him by his text." In this perspective, Houellebecq's "epiphrastic commentary" is a "tool chosen to describe and denounce this rotten society stuck in its contradictions," used in combination with the cliché.

Jean-Jacques Robrieux has shown that the epiphrase, often inserted by apposition, participates in Voltaire's hidden arguments in his Treatise on Tolerance.

== See also ==
- Digression
- Hyperbaton
- Palinody or palinode
- Parabasis
- Parenthesis or brackets
- Figure of speech

== Bibliography ==
- Bacry, Patrick (1992). Les Figures de style et autres procédés stylistiques. Collection Sujets (in French). Paris: Armand Colin. ISBN 2-7011-1393-8.
- Dupriez, Bernard (2003). Gradus, les procédés littéraires. Domaine français (in French). Paris: Union générale d'édition. ISBN 978-2-264-03709-1.
- Gorp, Van; Delabastita, Dirk; Legros, Georges; Grutman, Rainier; and alii (2005). Dictionnaire des termes littéraires, Hendrik (in French). Hendrik: Honoré Champion. ISBN 978-2-7453-1325-6.
- Robrieux, Jean-Jacques (2004). Les Figures de style et de rhétorique. Les topos (in French). Paris: Dunod. ISBN 2-10-003560-6.
- Robrieux, Jean-Jacques (1993). Éléments de rhétorique et d'argumentation (in French). Paris: Dunod. ISBN 2-10-001480-3.
- Suhamy, Henri (2004). Les Figures de style. Que sais-je ? (in French). Vol. 1889. Paris: Presses universitaires de France. ISBN 2-13-044604-3.
- Aquien, Michèle; Molinié, Georges (1999). Dictionnaire de rhétorique et de poétique. La Pochothèque (in French). Paris: LGF. ISBN 2-253-13017-6.
- Groupe μ (1970). Rhétorique générale. Langue et langage (in French). Paris: Larousse. ISBN 2-02-006321-2.
- Genette, Gérard (1972a). Figures II (in French). Paris: Seuil.
- Genette, Gérard (1972b). Figures III. Poétique (in French). Le Seuil.
- Domingues de Almeida, José (2007). Réactions à la réaction. Brèves considérations sur le sens de l'épiphrase dans Les particules élémentaires de Michel Houellebecq. Vol. 3. Çédille. ISSN 1699-4949.
- Dodille, Norbert (2009). L'air ambiant : poétique de l'épiphrase dans L'amour impossible in Barbey d'Aurevilly 13. Sur l'Histoire. Vol. 824–828. Revue des lettres modernes. ISSN 0035-2136.
