= W Juliet =

Japanese manga series

- English cover of volume 1

W ジュリエット (Daburu Jurietto)
- Genre: Romantic comedy
- Manga
- Written by: Emura
- Published by: Hakusensha
- English publisher: NA: Viz Media
- Magazine: Hana to Yume
- Original run: October 15, 1997 – November 20, 2002
- Volumes: 14
- Manga

W Juliet II
- Written by: Emura
- Published by: Hakusensha
- Magazine: The Hana to Yume
- Original run: 2006 – present
- Volumes: 12

W Juliet (Japanese: W ジュリエット, Hepburn: Daburu Jurietto) is a shōjo romantic comedy manga series by Emura. It was published by Hakusensha in Hana to Yume between 1997 and 2002 and collected in 14 bound volumes. It is about the relationship between tomboy Ito Miura and the feminine Makoto Amano who share the common dream of becoming actors, as they work together to hide Makoto's secret identity as a boy. It is licensed in English by Viz Media. A sequel series, W Juliet II, is ongoing in The Hana to Yume, and collected in four volumes as of February 2015.

The title comes from the Japanese adoption of the letter "W" as a character meaning "double", so the title W Juliet means "Two Juliets". Two Juliets is the theme and conflict in the first chapter, during which the drama club puts on a production of Romeo and Juliet with Ito and Makoto in the title roles.

== Plot ==
At the start of the series, Ito Miura meets the beautiful transfer student Makoto Amano, and the girls become instant friends. Their personalities are completely different—Makoto is calm, quiet, and beautifully feminine, while Ito speaks, dresses, and behaves like a boy—but they share the same dream: becoming an actor. As soon as Makoto gets on stage at the drama club, it is clear she has talent, enough so she is cast as Juliet in the upcoming production of Romeo and Juliet, opposite Ito as Romeo. However, Makoto has a rival for the role in Tsugumi Nomura, an upperclassman who is obsessed with the boyish Ito. Worse, Ito learns Makoto's secret: "she" is actually a "he". Makoto's strict father wants him to inherit the family dojo, and made a bet with his son—if Makoto shows he has the skill to pose as a female for his last two years of high school, he can become an actor as he wishes, but if anyone discovers his gender, he must stay home and accept the dojo. Ito agrees to keep Makoto's secret so that he could continue with his dream.

The series follows Ito and Makoto during their last two years of high school, as they work to improve their acting and keep Makoto's secret. They start out just as friends, but continue as boyfriend and girlfriend. One of the obstacles they must face is keeping their relationship a secret from their family and friends, both because of Makoto's assumed gender and it would expose his secret. They must also worry about Makoto's jealous arranged fiancée, Takayo, and her brother, who has a strong sister complex, and Ito's various suitors. All the while, the drama club performs various plays, some of which are essential to demonstrating Makoto's acting skill to his father.

== Characters ==
The Japanese long 'o' and long 'u' are transliterated as 'ô' and 'û' in the Viz Media English language release.

=== Main characters ===
Ito Miura (三浦 糸, Miura Ito)
A 17-year-old tomboy, Ito is the only girl in a family with three brothers and her father. She started wearing boys' clothes, as well as adopting a boyish haircut, after her mother was killed in a car accident when she was six. In volume 10, she explains she did so to avoid needing her brothers' protection from the bullying of a classmate named Jotaro. Ito is idolized by many girls at school, and she is known for being mobbed on Valentine's Day despite being a girl. She is the female president of the school drama club. As an actor, Ito is more noted for her charisma and physical ability, rather than her considerable technical skills. She is rather headstrong and often reacts to situations without thinking things through. She is depicted as not being a good cook, although according to an author's note, she is good at "cooking for a crowd." When Ito discovers that Makoto is a boy, she decides to help him and eventually falls in love with him. As the series progresses, Ito starts adopting more feminine habits to be the perfect girl for Makoto, at first unconsciously but then consciously. She still however retains some of her boyish mannerisms, specifically her extrovert liveliness.
During the series, Ito has several admirers aside from Makoto. These include Toki-senpai, a former drama club member now in college, who wants Ito to be more feminine; Tsugumi-senpai, a year ahead of Ito, who is obsessed with Ito's boyish side, going so far as to call her "Ito-kun," using a primarily male suffix (see Japanese honorifics); and Sakamoto, a "masochist" who likes both Ito and Makoto. In volume 10, Ito meets Jotaro again and he confesses that he teased her because he liked her. Ito rejects him, as she had once liked him, telling him that she is already in love with someone else.
In volume 13 they audition for a troupe of actors. A key test is what they improvise for a situation: the test-actor comes home and finds a robber in his/her home. Makoto wraps a sash around his waist and performs it as a female ghost who invites the robber to eternal rest. Ito follows Makoto, and performs it as a guy, who belittles the robber as an amateur. Do you think you could rob a professional? Then proceeds to beat up the other actor, and gets out of hand and breaks the judges' table. When results are posted Makoto and the actor #12 are accepted. As Ito declares that she will audition with other troupes someone they know, Jotaro's father, comes up and congratulates both of them, both accepted. Ito had been accepted solely on the decision of director Igarashi, "Because you're an idiot!". Everyone agreed that nobody got into their role quite so much as Ito had, and that her skills can be polished.
Ito's name (糸) means "thread," which in the story comes from her father's wish for a name that is "slender and pretty" and her mother's wish for a name that "can be used to make something." Though Makoto's father considers her name a bad omen, as "a breaking thread," she considers it a blessing and a symbol of her creativity.
Makoto Narita (成田 真, Narita Makoto) / Makoto Amano (天野 真琴, Amano Makoto)
At age 17, Makoto Narita made a deal: to convince his father he had both the talent and determination to become an actor, Makoto is to spend his last two years of high school as a girl. If anyone finds out, Makoto will stay home and inherit his father's dojo. With the help of his sister, Akane, Makoto transforms himself into a girl and transfers to a new school as Makoto Amano. There, he meets and quickly befriends Ito, who has an opposite personality but shares his love of the theater. As actors, too, they complement each other, with Makoto having the greater technical skill but Ito more charisma. When Ito discovers Makoto's identity, she decides to help him keep his secret. At first, Makoto tries to hide his feelings for Ito but soon shows he is falling in love with her.
Makoto is quite skilled, able to cook, clean, do makeup, and select clothing, and is able to pick up new abilities quickly, such as juggling. He is more subtle and observant, able to handle delicate situations with more tact and skill, than the gung-ho Ito. However, he is also introverted and prone to holding grudges, especially against his father and oldest sister. Makoto is the only blond in his family, as a result of his English grandmother.

=== Drama club ===
Ito and Makoto's friends in the drama club, Yoshirô, Misaki, and Nobuko, first appeared in another manga by Emura, Mokugekisha ("Eyewitness").

Yoshirô Ozaki (尾崎 与四郎, Ozaki Yoshirō)
The drama club's male president, counterpart to Ito as female president. Yoshirô plays both male and female roles, such as the King in Swan Lake and the Nurse in Romeo and Juliet. He and Ito have been friends since they met in their second year of middle school, posing the question of whether a true friendship between male and female is possible? As opposed to a romantic tie. Yoshirô is secretly in love with Misaki, another Drama Club member. In a contest the last day of Drama Camp, in volume 10, Yoshirô loses and is forced to read aloud his secret wish: "I love Misaki," but it languishes until volume 11 ...
Misaki Ichikawa (市川 美咲, Ichikawa Misaki)
A member of the drama club, noted for being particularly feminine. During the series, Misaki plays such roles as a Lady-In-Waiting in Swan Lake and the Prince in Romeo and Juliet. She is best friends with Nobuko and likes Yoshirô. Eventually, frustrated by his inability to act authentically, with real feeling, with her, she ignores him for some time until, encouraged by Ito, he commandeers the school PA system to publicly declare his love for her.
Nobuko Kataoka (片岡 伸子, Kataoka Nobuko)
The principal writer of the drama club. Nobuko writes, and as needed rewrites, most of the adaptations the club performs; she also plays roles such as a Lady-In-Waiting in Swan Lake and Lady Capulet in Romeo and Juliet. Although in high school, she has had a novel published. In volume 12, Nobuko claims she thinks of Toki-Senpai as like a father to her, but after she is taken hostage by thieves, Toki-Senpai particularly worries about her, and it is implied that after this the two begin dating together.

=== Miura family ===
Gorô Miura (三浦 悟郎, Miura Gorō)
Ito's father, and widower of Satsuki. Gorô is the eldest son of Mitsuko, and was heir to the family until he withdrew from the family succession to marry Satsuki. They moved to the city and he began his own dojo. He cares deeply for his children, and is especially fond of his only daughter, Ito. As a parent, he is frequently absent, either at his dojo or meeting his writing deadlines as a novelist, but interferes with his children in one area: their choices for marriage. Gorô wants their mates to have "good eyes" and to be able to meet his gaze, as a sign of sincerity, integrity, and strong will. Despite this overprotectiveness, he allows his children to live freely, as his wife wanted them to. Despite his stubbornness and tendency to be dramatic, overall he is a wise and understanding person.
Satsuki Miura (三浦 皐月, Miura Satsuki)
Ito's mother, who died in a car accident when Ito was six, about ten years before the series start. A strong, attractive woman, Satsuki was a dedicated wife and mother with a ferocious temper. She was particularly close to Yûto while alive, though she also had a close relationship with her only daughter. She was supportive of Ito's tomboy tendencies, because she had been much like Ito as a child. Satsuki's mother disappeared when she was 12, and her father died when she was 15, after which Satsuki was taken in by Mitsuko, Gorô's mother. Eventually, she and Gorô fell in love and eloped. The last thing Satsuki said to Ito before her death was to "live freely, and become the woman you want to be when you find the one who moves your heart."
Ryûya Miura (三浦 竜矢, Miura Ryūya)
Ito's oldest brother, and Yûto's twin, aged 23 years. Ryûya shares his father's dramatic personality, especially when angered. He is the most protective of the family of Ito, and after their mother's death, he taught her martial arts. As the eldest son, he is usually in charge of the household, as their father, Gorô, is usually either at the dojo or writing his novels. When Ryûya went to college, he met a foreign exchange student from America, Christina, and after a year of interesting courtship, they fell in love. For a while he and Gorô fought over going out with her, due to Gorô's declarations of never allowing a foreigner to marry any of his children. Christina or "Chris" eventually comes to challenge Gorô to date Ryūya, resorting to underhanded tactics to punch him in the face. Fortunately, Gorô instantly respects her for her resourcefulness and courage and gives the couple his blessing.
Yûto Miura (三浦 悠斗, Miura Yūto)
Ito's second oldest brother, and Ryûya's twin, aged 23 years. (To tell the twins apart, Yûto is the twin with shorter hair, and he smokes.) Yûto is the family cook, thanks to his mother's lessons, and also works as a cook at a hotel restaurant. He is level-headed and introverted, almost the opposite of his twin brother's, although his dedication to his younger sister is just as strong. Because of his fears of losing those he loves like he lost his mother, he has trouble meeting new people and allowing them into his life. Despite this, when Yûto meets Akane, Makoto's sister, they begin dating, and their relationship grows deeper as the series progresses.
Tatsuyoshi Miura (三浦 竜良, Miura Tatsuyoshi)
Ito's younger brother, aged 15 years. He always wears sunglasses on his head because he claims it makes him look cool. Although he prefers hanging out with his friends at the arcade, as the youngest child he gets stuck with a lot of the household work. Although he does not show it as much as his older brothers, he cares a lot about Ito, and defends her when necessary. He serves on the school student council. Although he claims he wishes to go out with a girl who is the opposite of Ito, he is interested in another member of the student council, Rie, whose personality is identical to his older sister's. Tatsuyoshi is featured in Emura's manga Nana-iro no Shinwa.
Mitsuko Miura (三浦 光子, Miura Mitsuko)
Ito's grandmother and the Miura family matriarch. Mitsuko is a small but crafty old woman who is stronger than she looks. She originally took Satsuki in after she was orphaned, and later helped her and Gorô elope. Mitsuko has a bizarre fascination with different fashions, using her grandchildren and their friends as her "victims." She is especially fond of Japanese historical fashions. Normally she has a mild demeanor, but she is ruthless in pursuing her goal of having a stable family heir, which leads her one time to kidnap Ito and challenge Ito's brothers into fighting to retrieve her. First seen in volume 6.
Tomoe Miura (三浦 巴, Miura Tomoe)
Ito's cousin, the son of Gorô's younger sister Setsuko. He is three years younger than Ito and the presumptive heir to the Miura family's (Mitsuko's) dojo. He infuriates his strict mother by always crossdressing and thinking of himself as a girl. Ito is the only woman he claims to be interested in, which leads to their grandmother Mitsuko offering Ito the place of her successor.
Setsuko Miura (三浦 節子, Miura Setsuko)
Gorô's younger sister and Tomoe's mother. She has the same explosive temper as her brother, but Ryuya and Yuto note that while their father is fire, she is ice. Years before, she helped torment Satsuki, including roughly cutting off her long hair. She finally ended up kidnapping and locking Satsuki up in order to prevent her brother from eloping with her. Eventually, she comes to accept her brother's children. Her son Tomoe causes her the most grief by refusing to be a proper boy, to the point she frequently chases after him to dropkick some toughness into him. She also has a daughter Kozue, described as "sickly" and two years older than Tomoe.

=== Narita family ===
Masumi Narita (成田 真澄, Narita Masumi)
Makoto's father is a strict disciplinarian who runs a kenpo martial arts dojo. He is a man of tradition, who feels that absolute respect from his family is very important. After his oldest child, Sakura, eloped to escape the arranged marriage that he had set up to preserve the dojo, he took drastic measures to keep them from ever disobeying him—focusing especially Makoto, his only son and prospective heir to the dojo. For a couple years after Sakura's elopement, Masumi trained Makoto strictly, rarely letting him out of the house. Shortly before the series starts, after Masumi settled down, Makoto offered a proposition: if he could disguise himself as a girl for the rest of high school, to show how serious he is, Masumi would allow him to become an actor. Masumi frequently sends spies to check up on Makoto, though he eventually calls them off for a while when he sends another challenge to Makoto. Though he is strict with most of his family, he is gentler with his wife, Risa, who can match him in ferocity, and he dotes on his second daughter, Tsubaki, whom he sees as the most obedient of his children. Masumi particularly enjoys eating his wife's homemade caramel flan five times a day.
Risa Narita (成田 理紗, Narita Risa)
Risa, a frail middle-aged woman, is Makoto's mother. Risa's mother was English, from whom Makoto got his blond hair, and her maiden name was Amano, which Makoto uses for his alias at school. Unlike her husband, she wants her children to make their own choices; however, she rarely intercedes for her children. When she learned of Makoto's proposition to his father, she fainted from shock at the idea of her son dressing like a girl and that her chronic illness is implied to be mostly caused by it. Despite her frailty and mild demeanor, she is able to cow her husband with a single look, and during the series she violently forces her husband to reconcile with their oldest daughter, Sakura.
Sakura Sugiyama (杉山 桜, Sugiyama Sakura)
Sakura is Makoto's oldest sister, aged 25 years. A few years before the series starts, she eloped with her boyfriend to escape an arranged marriage. Angered by this, her father took out his frustration on his other children, especially Makoto. She is on estranged terms from her father and her sister Tsubaki, but secretly maintains contact with her other sister Akane and younger brother Makoto. However, when they meet, Makoto stands silently behind Akane, never speaking to Sakura, to her great sadness. When, later in the series, Sakura meets Makoto and Ito during a class trip, she is pleased to see that Makoto has softened up in Ito's presence. She feels that because of Ito, Makoto can be more himself, especially after being stifled under his father's influence. With Ito's help, Makoto and Sakura finally are able to make amends after six years of silence.
As evidenced by her elopement, Sakura has the fiercest personality of the four Narita children and is incredibly headstrong. Marriage has mellowed her but she has a whimsical side that emerges occasionally, particularly in Ito's presence. Sakura has a complex with pretty girls and will sometimes drag a hapless Ito to the bathroom to put make up on her.
Sakura's husband Taiki is a fairly successful artist, and they have a young son Satoshi. As the result of an exhibition of her husband's work, and some scheming by Ito, Sakura reconciles with her father, although her mother has to forcibly make father and daughter behave. Sakura's name (桜) means "cherry blossom," part of a theme of flower names for the three Narita daughters.
Tsubaki Narita (成田 椿, Narita Tsubaki)
Tsubaki is the middle of Makoto's three older sisters, aged 24 years. Tsubaki is a biology teacher who, under her father's orders, comes to work at Makoto's school to spy on him. She feels that, unlike her other siblings, she does all that their father asks, and she resents Sakura because she was left to ease their father's temper after Sakura eloped. Despite her submissive attitude towards her father, Tsubaki has a firm personality with a frightening ability to lead, demonstrated when she trains her class to be ultimate athletes to win an inter-class athletic tournament. She is obsessed with Makoto, and has pictures of him all over the walls of her room, and as his older sister believes she knows what is best for him. Although she disapproves of the deal Makoto made with their father, she occasionally gives Makoto frilly dresses to wear as a girl. Tsubaki is the opposite of her older sister Sakura in that she has an obsession with pretty boys, with something of a shota complex, and she is disappointed when she realizes Ito is a girl.
When Tsubaki learns that Ito knows Makoto's true identity, she orders Makoto to come home on the grounds that he lost his deal with his father, but relents when Makoto pleads with her, on the condition that Ito and Makoto's class wins an inter-class athletic competition, which they narrowly lose. However, with Akane's help, they recreate a scene from Beauty and the Beast for Tsubaki and so persuade her that Makoto's passion and talent for his acting is real, and that Makoto is happier and more natural with Ito than he ever was with his sisters. Tsubaki finally promises not to tell their father. In her last major scene in 'W Juliet' she has moved out of her father's house into her own apartment, closer to work, and hosts Makoto's 18th birthday party. She has an affectionate relationship with Makoto's fiance, Takayo, and dotes on her. Tsubaki's name (椿) means "camellia," a flower like her sisters.
Akane Narita (成田 茜, Narita Akane)
Akane is the youngest of Makoto's three older sisters, aged 22 years. She works as a make-up artist, though she is still technically a student. She looks almost exactly like Makoto before she cuts her hair halfway through the first volume. Although she is a quiet and naturally formal type of person, she is also observant and wise. Though she isn't as rebellious as Sakura, she isn't the obedient daughter that Tsubaki is, demonstrated in her determination to be a make-up artist, much to her father's disapproval. She also demonstrates great empathy as well as an unexpected backbone, despite her conflict between pleasing her parents and following her dreams. Akane originally inspired Makoto to become an actor when she sneaked him out of the house when they were younger to see a local play. She is the most supportive of Makoto's family of his decision to become an actor, and she frequently helps him keep up his act, for example, bringing him clothes or make-up when he needs them, helping him shop for girl's clothing, and teaching him how to apply makeup. Akane is the first of their family to learn about Makoto's secret relationship with Ito. She appears to like Ito a lot, and when she eventually meets Ito's brother Yûto, the two hit it off very well.
Over the course of the series, Akane comes to be stronger, to the point in which she stands up to her father to refuse the arranged marriage he sets up for her. She also comes to break through Yûto's emotional shell and forces him to face his feelings for her as well as his feelings for others. Akane's name (茜) means "madder," completing the trend of flower names for the Narita sisters.
Takayo Iizuka (飯塚 隆世, Iizuka Takayo)
Makoto's sickly fiancée, through an engagement arranged by his father. To her dismay, however, Makoto never acknowledges her as more than a friend. Takayo acts demurely in front of elders and Makoto, but she is jealous of Ito and wishes to be rid of her. Because revealing Makoto's secret would effectively return him to confinement in the Narita house and make her feel dirty, she keeps it, though reluctantly. Takayo transfers into his school to be closer to him, but due to her poor health, she is absent much of the time. Her family is very rich, and she has bodyguards and spies at her disposal. Her elder brother has a "little sister complex" and will do anything for her; he feels his sister is truly noble, and would do anything for her, and is often moved to tears by the smallest acts on her part. When he learns of Makoto's secret, only her begging him stops him from revealing it. According to an author's note, originally she was conceived as a much nastier character with a "persecution complex".

== Development ==
According to an author's note, W Juliet was created as a one-shot manga early in her career, after she had published around eight other one-shots. Public response brought an invitation to write a second chapter, and so on, until by the fourth chapter's responses, it was decided that Emura could continue the story as a continuing series, eventually enabling her to quit her day job, and later enabling her to hire her sister as an assistant.

Originally, Ito and Makoto were both going to be called Ito, but Emura's editor convinced her to change their names. According to the author, if they had shared a name, the "W" (double) in the title would have had more significance. Emura then bestowed the second Ito name on the club's faculty advisor, Ms. Ito.

== Media ==
=== Manga ===
W Juliet was published by Hakusensha in Hana to Yume between 1997 and 2002 and collected in 14 bound volumes. It is licensed in North America by VIZ Media, in France by Pika Édition, in Spain by Panini Comics, in Germany by Carlsen Comics (which is serializing it in Daisuki), and in Sweden by Manga Media.

No.	Original release date	Original ISBN	North America release date	North America ISBN
1	May 1999	978-4-592-17341-0	November 10, 2004	978-1-59116-598-9
2	September 1999	978-4-592-17342-7	January 11, 2005	978-1-59116-602-3
3	December 1999	978-4-592-17343-4	March 15, 2005	978-1-59116-600-9
4	May 2000	978-4-592-17344-1	May 15, 2005	978-1-59116-781-5
5	September 2000	978-4-592-17345-8	July 15, 2005	978-1-59116-848-5
6	December 2000	978-4-592-17346-5	September 6, 2005	978-1-59116-989-5
7	April 2001	978-4-592-17347-2	November 8, 2005	978-1-4215-0065-2
8	August 2001	978-4-592-17348-9	January 10, 2006	978-1-4215-0205-2
9	December 2001	978-4-592-17349-6	March 14, 2006	978-1-4215-0328-8
10	April 19, 2002	978-4-592-17350-2	May 9, 2006	978-1-4215-0563-3
11	August 19, 2002	978-4-592-17287-1	July 11, 2006	978-1-4215-0564-0
12	October 18, 2002	978-4-592-17260-4	December 12, 2006	978-1-4215-0565-7
13	January 17, 2003	978-4-592-17290-1	November 14, 2006	978-1-4215-0566-4
14	March 19, 2003	978-4-592-17100-3	January 9, 2007	978-1-4215-0567-1

A sequel series, W Juliet II, is ongoing in the irregularly published The Hana to Yume magazine, and collected in twelve volumes as of December 2021.

No.	Release date	ISBN
1	December 18, 2006	978-4-592-18857-5
2	March 19, 2008	978-4-592-18861-2
3	March 19, 2011	978-4-592-18868-1
4	February 20, 2015	978-4-592-21444-1
5	April 20, 2016	978-4-592-21445-8
6	September 20, 2016	978-4-592-21446-5
7	March 20, 2017	978-4-592-21447-2
8	April 20, 2018	978-4-592-21448-9
9	April 20, 2020	978-4-592-21449-6
10	June 19, 2020	978-4-592-21450-2
11	March 19, 2021	978-4-592-22391-7
12	December 20, 2021	978-4-592-22392-4
13	December 20, 2022	978-4-592-22393-1
14	August 18, 2023	978-4-592-22394-8
15	November 20, 2024	978-4-592-22395-5
16	August 20, 2025	978-4-592-22544-7
17	July 17, 2026	978-4-592-22592-8

=== Drama CDs ===
W Juliet was adapted as a series of three drama CDs released in Japan. One of the discs was only made available to Hana to Yume fans.

== Reception ==
Sakura Eries felt the first volume was "pure and simple romantic comic fluff, and it's a lot of fun". She enjoyed the comedy of the second volume, and found Ito and Makoto's developing relationship "endearing". Eries enjoyed the amusement park storyline which derived its humour from Makoto's cross-dressing, but found it implausible that Ito could not rescue herself from Toki, and felt this situation was out of place with the tone of the rest of the volume. Eries enjoyed the introduction of Makoto and Ito's families, which she felt allowed the two to expand their own roles in the story aside from student, actor and boyfriend/girlfriend. By the twelfth volume, Carl Kimlinger felt that W Juliet toed the line "between comfortable and stagnant" too often, and felt that the story had no "real suspense", as each character has "a certain core decency" that can be reached.

June Shimoshi, writing for Library Journal, recommended the manga for teen collections, saying " Despite the wacky gender-bending scenario, this old-fashioned shōjo romance emphasizes hard work, strong convictions, and the importance of family. It balances humor with quiet, reflective scenes."
