= Parabasis =

Part of Greek play

In Greek comedy, the parabasis (plural parabases; Ancient Greek: παράβασις, plural: παραβάσεις) is a point in the play when all of the actors leave the stage and the chorus is left to address the audience directly. The chorus partially or completely abandons its dramatic role, to step forward (parabasis) and talk to the audience on a topic completely irrelevant to the subject of the play.

== Structure ==
A parabasis usually consists of three songs (S) alternating with three speeches (s) (or recitatives) in the order S-s-S-s-S-s. The first speech, or parabasis proper - generally in anapaest - often ends with a passage which is to be rattled off very quickly (theoretically in one breath - called a πνῖγος – pnigos).

== Examples ==
- In The Knights, we find Aristophanes offers a survey of the Athenian comic tradition, thereby enhancing his own role: “if one of the old comic poets had tried to force us Knights to address the public in the parabasis he wouldn’t have got away with so lightly. But this time the poet is worthy...”.
- In the play The Wasps by the same author, the first parabasis is about Aristophanes' career as a playwright to date; while the second parabasis is shorter, and contains a string of in-jokes about local characters who would be well known to the ancient Athenian audience (e.g. the politician Cleon).

== Authorial voice ==
The chorus in the parabasis sometimes uses its own voice, sometimes that of the play's author, to address the audience. How far the latter is to be taken as ‘authentic’ is a matter for debate. The old view was that Aristophanes is speaking directly to his fellow-Athenians in the parabasis; and that as a result, as Northrop Frye put it, “his opinions on every subject are written all over his plays”. by contrast, a postmodern interpretation would take the authorial voice as metatheatrical, offering a parody of rhetorical debating points, rather than unmediated criticism.

== Decline ==
The parabasis is exclusively a feature of Old Comedy, and its decline can be charted in the plays of Aristophanes. The second parabasis is gradually abandoned, the chorus ceases to speak out of character in the parabasis itself, and finally the latter is abandoned altogether.

Where the diminishment in the role of the chorus was traditionally linked to the financial pressures of wartime, more recently Stephen Halliwell has preferred to see the decline in terms of theatrical evolution.

== See also ==
- Agon
- Fourth wall
- Parodos
- Unreliable narrator
- Epiphrase
