= Rosemary Morris (historian) =

British historian

Rosemary Morris is a British historian specializing in Byzantium. Morris taught medieval history at the University of Manchester from 1974 to 2003, and subsequently became a visiting fellow at the University of York.

She was chair of the Society for the Promotion of Byzantine Studies from 2008 to 2012.

== Books ==
Morris is the author of:

- Monks and Laymen in Byzantium, 843–1118 (Cambridge University Press, 1995)

with Robert H. Jordan (Institute of Byzantine Studies, Queen’s University, Belfast):

- The Hypotyposis of the Monastery of the Theotokos Evergetis, Constantinople (11th—12th Centuries) (Ashgate, 2012)
- The Life and Death of Theodore of Stoudios (Harvard University Press, 2021)

== See also ==
- Hypotyposis
