= The Wasps (Vaughan Williams) =

Incidental music composed by Ralph Vaughan Williams

Ralph Vaughan Williams in 1913

The Wasps is incidental music composed by the British composer Ralph Vaughan Williams in 1909. It was written for the Cambridge Greek Play production of Aristophanes' The Wasps at Trinity College, Cambridge, and was Vaughan Williams' first of only three forays into incidental music. A later performance of the work was one of only a small number of performances conducted by Vaughan Williams that was committed to a recording.

It was scored for baritone solo voices, a chorus of tenors and baritones (in two parts each), and orchestra. The complete incidental music is lengthy (about 1 hour and 45 minutes) and is not often performed.

Vaughan Williams later arranged parts of the music into an orchestral suite (about 26 minutes), in five parts:

1. Overture
2. Entr'acte
3. March Past of the Kitchen Utensils
4. Entr'acte
5. Ballet and Final Tableau

The "Overture" is quite concise (about 10 minutes) and is a popular independent concert piece today. The main theme is pentatonic. There are close to 30 recordings now available of the overture. The "March Past of the Kitchen Utensils" is sometimes separately performed. The entire orchestral suite is also sometimes performed and recorded.

The year before he wrote The Wasps, Vaughan Williams spent three months in Paris studying with Maurice Ravel, whose influence is apparent in the middle section. Although The Wasps may reflect something of Ravel, the outer sections are quintessential Vaughan Williams.
