= Characterization =

Representation of persons in narrative and dramatic works of art

Characterization or characterisation is the representation of characters (persons, creatures, or other beings) in narrative and dramatic works. The term character development is sometimes used as a synonym. This representation may include direct methods like the attribution of qualities in description or commentary, and indirect (or "dramatic") methods inviting readers to infer qualities from characters' actions, dialogue, or appearance. Such a personage is called a character. Character(s) is an essential narrative element.

== History ==
The term characterization was introduced in the 19th century. Aristotle promoted the primacy of plot over characters, that is, a plot-driven narrative, arguing in his Poetics that tragedy "is a representation, not of men, but of action and life." This view was reversed in the 19th century, when the primacy of the character, that is, a character-driven narrative, was affirmed first with the realist novel, and increasingly later with the influential development of psychology.

== Direct vs. indirect ==
There are two ways an author can convey information about a character:

Direct or explicit characterization
The author literally tells the audience what a character is like. This may be done via the narrator, another character or by the character themselves.
Indirect or implicit characterization
The audience must infer for themselves what the character is like through the character's thoughts, actions, speech (choice of words, manner of speaking), physical appearance, mannerisms and interaction with other characters, including other characters' reactions to that particular person.

== In drama ==
Characters in theater, television, and film differ from those in novels in that an actor may interpret the writer's description and dialogue in their own unique way to add new layers and depth to a character. This can be seen when critics compare, for example, the 'Lady Macbeths' or 'Heathcliffs' of different actors. Another major difference in drama is that it is not possible to 'go inside the character's head' in the way possible in a novel, meaning this method of character exposition is unavailable. Still another is that in drama, a character usually can be seen and heard and need not be described.

== In mythology and religious texts ==
Mythological characters have been depicted to be formulaic and are a part of a classification that consists of several differing, limited archetypes, which is type of component. Multiple components, such as archetypes and other elements of a story, together form a type of configuration that results in fully realized myth. These configurations can be mixed and matched together to form new types of configurations, and humans have never tired of using these configurations for their mythologies. This is an idea that uses the kaleidoscopic model on narrating for mythology. Another perspective holds that humans when reading or hearing a mythology do not dissect it into various parts, that when physically together humans do not tell stories by using limited components in a configuration, and that people and their cultures do change and thus this leads to new developments in stories, including characters.

On the other hand, characters in the Hebrew Bible are depicted as fully developed individuals with character arcs. Across their long lives, figures like Jacob or David change drastically in response to what they have experienced. Biblical characters' triumphs and tribulations are morally profound and psychologically complex in ways that are absent in Homer.

Mythological characters have influence that extends to recent works of literature. The poet Platon Oyunsky draws heavily from the native mythology of his homeland, the Yakut region in Russia and the Sakha people. In several of his stories, he depicts a main character that follows historic examples of heroism, but fashions the main character using Soviet examples of heroism, even using real life figures, such as Stalin, Lenin, etc. in a new type of mythology. These figures often play the lead in tragic stories full of sacrifice. An example of this includes his character Tygyn, who on his quest for peace determines that the only way for peace to exist is to use military strength to enforce. The use of mythology is used in Shakespeare's Hamlet as a device to parallel the characters and to reflect back on them their role in the story, such as the use of the Niobe myth and the twin sister of Gertrude.

== Character archetypes ==
The psychologist Carl Jung identified twelve primary 'original patterns' of the human psyche. He believed that these reside in the collective subconscious of people across cultural and political boundaries. These twelve archetypes are often cited in fictional characters. 'Flat' characters may be considered so because they stick to a single archetype without deviating, whereas 'complex' or 'realistic' characters will combine several archetypes, with some being more dominant than others – as people are in real life. Jung's twelve archetypes are: the Innocent, the Orphan, the Hero, the Caregiver, the Explorer, the Rebel, the Lover, the Creator, the Jester, the Sage, the Magician, and the Ruler. However, Jung's notions of character archetypes have been considered problematic in a variety of ways. For example, the use of these archetypes is often reductive and unhelpful for many writers since it simplifies character complexity into clichéd tropes.

== Character's voice ==
A character's voice is their manner of speech. Different characters use different vocabularies and rhythms of speech. For example, some characters are talkative, others taciturn. The way a character speaks can be a powerful way of revealing the character's personality. In theory, a reader should be able to identify which character is speaking simply from the way they talk. When a character voice has been created that is rich and distinctive, the writer can get away with omitting many speech attributions (tag lines).

The manner of a character's speech is to literature what an actor's appearance and costume are to cinema. In fiction, what a character says, as well as how they say it, makes a strong impression on the reader. Each character should have their distinctive voice. To differentiate characters in fiction, the writer must show them doing and saying things, but a character must be defined by more than one single topic of conversation or by the character's accent. The character will have other interests or personality quirks as well. Although individual temperament is the largest determinant of what a character says, it is not the only one. The writer can make the characters' dialogue more realistic and interesting by considering several factors affecting how people speak: personality psychology, age, culture, family background, region, gender, education, and circumstances. Words characterize by their diction, cadence, complexity, attitude and fluency. Mannerisms and catch-phrases can help too. Considering the degree of formality in spoken language is also useful. Introverts tend to use more formal language compared to extroverts, who typically speak in a more casual and colloquial manner. Characters who spend a lot of their lives in a more formal setting often use a more formal language all the time, while others never do. Tone of voice, volume, rate of delivery, vocabulary, inflection, emphasis, pitch, topics of conversation, idioms, colloquialisms, and figures of speech: all of these are expressions of who the character is on the inside. A character's manner of speech must grow from the inside out. The speaking is how their essential personality leaks out for the world to see; it is not the sum total of their personality.

== See also ==
- Character creation
- Character traits
- Ethopoeia
