= Ethopoeia =

Rhetorical technique

Ethopoeia is the ancient Greek term for the creation of a character. Ethopoeia was a technique used by early students of rhetoric in order to create a successful speech or oration by impersonating a subject or client. Ethopoeia contains elements of both ethos and pathos and this is noticeable in the three divisions of ethopoeia. These three divisions are pathetical (dealing with emotions), ethical (dealing with character) and mixed (a combination of both emotion and character). It is essential to impersonation, one of the fourteen progymnasmata exercises created for the early schools of rhetoric.

== Definition ==
Ethopoeia, derived from the Greek ethos (character) and poeia (representation), is the ability to capture the ideas, words, and style of delivery suited to the person for whom an address is written. It also involves adapting a speech to the exact conditions under which it is to be spoken. In fact, while the argument can be made that the act of impersonating words, ideas and style to an audience is the most important factor of ethopoeia, the audience and situational context have a huge impact on whether the technique will actually work. A rhetor has to make sure they are impersonating a character the audience will find appealing. The rhetor also has to make sure the character they are playing is the right one for the situation they find themselves in. Finally, ethopoeia is the art of discovering the exact lines of argument that will turn the case against the opponent. Ethopoeia is largely related to impersonation, a progymnasmata exercise in which early students of rhetoric would compose a dialogue in the style of a person they chose to portray. These dialogues were often dramatic in nature, using description and emotional language where appropriate, fitting the speech to the character of the speaker and the circumstances.

== Views ==
Aristotle held that ethopoeia was something that every rhetor engaged in. This view was uncommon; people at the time seemed to mostly associate the rhetoric strategy with speech and play writers. Aristotle also viewed ethopoeia as an action that took into consideration not only the past, but the present. A rhetor would be able to construct a persona based on similar characters' past actions but ethopoeia is an action that takes place in the present. A rhetor has to be able to impersonate on the fly. Aristotle also noted the importance of concealment. The element of concealment is very useful in ethopoeia's ability to win over an audience and be an effective form of rhetoric. An audience is less likely to fall victim to the charm of ethopoeia if they are actively aware that a form of impersonating is going on. Overall, Aristotle's view of the technique did not seem to take into consideration the risks of it, most notably the notion of trickery. Aristotle's teacher, Plato, did not overlook this negative connotation. Plato viewed ethopoeia as a strategy of deceit and trickery. He looked at it as though it was double sided, one that could be useful but also had the ability to be untrustworthy.

== Usage ==
Perhaps one of the most prominent employers of ethopoeia was Lysias, an Ancient Greek logographer (speech writer). In his service to the public, Lysias was known for his ability to assess his client's needs and write a speech as though the words he wrote were those of the client. This was especially important in the case of court appeals. One such court appeal is On the Murder of Eratosthenes, which was written for Euphiletos in his defense. Euphiletos was accused of killing Eratosthenes after catching him in the act of adultery with his wife. In order to convince the jury that Euphiletos was innocent, Lysias familiarized himself with Euphiletos's character and portrayed him as trusting and naive. At the same time, he portrayed Eratosthenes as a notorious adulterer. He further used Euphiletos's character to claim the homicide as justifiable.

In other literature, ethopoeia is used in Homer's epic The Iliad. After losing his son, Hector, at the hands of Achilles, King Priam begs for the return of Hector's body for a proper burial. He asks Achilles for pity, stating that "I have endured what no one on earth has ever done before - I put my lips to the hands of the man who killed my son." and even goes so far as to invoke the memory of Achilles's own father, Peleus. This forces Achilles to put himself in Priam's situation, and he decides to return the body of Hector.

Isocrates has also noted that a speaker's character was essential to the persuasive effect of a speech.

== See also ==
- Characterization
