= Effect of reality =

The effect of reality (French: effet de réel) is a textual device identified by Roland Barthes, the purpose of which was to establish literary texts as realistic.

== History ==
Barthes first suggested this concept in his 1968 essay "The Reality Effect," in which he argues that untheorized descriptive "residues" of the text produce effects of reality through their dissembling of the tripartite sign. In the absence of any signified, Barthes argues, the textual signifiers for "real" objects had for their actual signifieds only the concept of realism itself; further, Barthes suggested that the origins of this textual device came through the development of an "aesthetic finality of language" present in the use of the rhetorical device of ecphrasis in "Alexandrian neo-rhetoric of the second century".

Barthes also showed that this effect of reality was a key problem of historical analysis and writing in that historical writing proclaimed an unproblematic realism that was in fact just this textual device in action. It was this aspect of the effect of reality that Ankersmit showed helped to explain both the evolution of historical enquiry and the problematic textual nature of history.

The concern with realism and the constructed nature of historical and literary facts that both Barthes and Ankersmit expressed is also to be found in the field of Discursive psychology; and Jonathan Potter have analysed similar problems and issues in his "Representing Reality".
