= Digression =

Temporary shift of subject in speech or text

Digression (παρέκβασις [parékbasis] in Greek; egressio, digressio or excursio in Latin) is a section of a composition or speech that marks a temporary shift of subject; the digression ends when the writer or speaker returns to the main topic. Digressions can be used intentionally as a stylistic or rhetorical device.

In classical rhetoric since Corax of Syracuse, especially in Institutio Oratoria of Quintilian, digression was a regular part of any oration or composition. After setting out the topic of a work and establishing the need for attention to be given, the speaker or author would digress to a seemingly disconnected subject before returning to a development of the composition's theme, a proof of its validity, and a conclusion. A schizothemia (from Ancient Greek σχῐ́ζωθέμία, lit. 'split discussion') is a digression by means of a long reminiscence.

Cicero was a master of digression, particularly in his ability to shift from the specific question or issue at hand (the hypothesis) to the more general issue or question that it depended upon (the thesis). As was the case with most ancient orators, Cicero's apparent digression always turned out to bear directly upon the issue at hand. During the Second Sophistic (in Imperial Rome), the ability to guide a speech away from a stated theme and then back again with grace and skill came to be a mark of true eloquence.

== Etymology ==
The term "digression" comes from the Latin word digressio: "a going away, departing," noun of action from past participle stem of digredi "to deviate", from dis- "apart, aside" + gradi "to step, go".

== Literary use ==
Digressions in a literary text serve a diverse array of functions, such as a means to provide background information, a way to illustrate or emphasize a point through example or anecdote, and even a channel through which to satirize a subject.

=== 800–500 BCE ===
In 800-500 BCE, Homer relies upon digression in his composition of The Iliad in order to provide his audience with a break from the primary narrative, to offer background information, and, most importantly, to enhance the story's verisimilitude. Through these digressions Homer ensures his audience's devotion to the characters and interest in the plot.

For example, in Book Eleven, Homer employs a mini-digression when Agamemnon comes upon brothers Peisandros and Hippolokhos in battle. After they come to Agamemnon as suppliants, he remembers that their father was one who denied Menelaos’ emissaries and “held out for killing [them] then and there”. This short interlude from the action provides the audience with a critical fact about the beginning of the war and the nature of the opposing parties.

=== 18th and 19th centuries ===
In 18th-century literature, the digression (not to be confused with subplot) was a substantial part of satiric works. Works such as Jonathan Swift's A Tale of a Tub, Laurence Sterne's Tristram Shandy and Diderot's Jacques le fataliste et son maître even made digressiveness itself a part of the satire. Sterne's novel, in particular, depended upon the digression, and he wrote, "Digressions, incontestably, are the sunshine; — they are the life, the soul of reading; — take them out of this book (Tristram Shandy) for instance, — you might as well take the book along with them." This use of digression as satire later showed up in Thomas Carlyle's work.

The digression was also used for non-satiric purposes in fiction. In Henry Fielding's The History of Tom Jones, a Foundling, the author has numerous asides and digressive statements that are a side-fiction, and this sort of digression within chapters shows up later in the work of Charles Dickens, Machado de Assis, William Makepeace Thackeray, Herman Melville, Victor Hugo and others. The novels of Leo Tolstoy, J.D. Salinger, Marcel Proust, Henry Miller, Milan Kundera and Robert Musil are also full of digressions.

=== 20th century ===
In late twentieth-century literature (in postmodern fiction), authors began to use digressions as a way of distancing the reader from the fiction and for creating a greater sense of play. John Fowles's The French Lieutenant's Woman and Lawrence Norfolk's Lemprière's Dictionary both employ digressions to offer scholarly background to the fiction, while others, like Gilbert Sorrentino in Mulligan Stew, use digression to prevent the functioning of the fiction's illusions.

== Real-life examples ==
Digression as a rhetorical device can also be found in present-day sermons: after introducing the topic, the speaker will introduce a story that seems to be unrelated, return to the original topic, and then use the story to illustrate the speaker's point.

Unintentional digressions in informal conversation and discussion are common. Speakers commonly use the phrase "But I digress..." after a digression to express the shift back to the main topic. Many examples of this use can already be found in 19th-century publications. Unless the speaker ties the "digression" back into the subject at hand, that shift in subject does not strictly constitute a rhetorical digression.

== See also ==
- Kishōtenketsu
- Spin-off (media)
- Spiritual successor
- Gaiden
- Epiphrase
