= Oxford Classical Drama Society =

- Founded: 1880
- President: Maggie Tighe
- Senior Member: Pantelis Michelakis

The Oxford Classical Drama Society (OCDS) is the funding body behind the triennial Oxford Greek Play, an institution that has lasted for over 130 years.

As well as choosing and funding the Greek Play, selecting a production team from a number of applications, the Society has in recent times aimed to extend its reach to other productions. As the Committee is appointed annually and the Greek Play is triennial, this leaves considerable opportunity for funding other Classical drama in Oxford. The Society is also involved in Education and Outreach programmes for both current and prospective students, as well as the wider community.

== Oxford Greek Play ==
Now held once every three years, the Oxford Greek Play (OGP) is performed in the original Greek, often with a specially commissioned English translation as accompaniment. Unlike the Cambridge Greek Play the Senior Member (the don responsible for the society to the University) is traditionally less involved in the production of the play itself, although access to some of the leading Classical scholars in the world is often used to great effect, especially in terms of pronunciation, translation, and textual coherence. This student-led approach means that there is often a dramatic change in style from play to play, because there is an entirely new team of directors, producers, designers, and actors each time (although some students have become veterans, experiencing several roles within different productions).

The OGP always attracts very large audiences, drawing students, academics, and schoolchildren from a wide area. The latest play, The Furies, ran for 7 performances (Wednesday-Saturday) at the Oxford Playhouse, one of Oxford largest theatres, and its total audience numbered almost 3,000.

Recent OGPs have included (at the Playhouse unless otherwise stated):

- 1979: Euripides' Hippolytus (in the gardens of St John's College)
- 1980: Aristophanes', Lysistrata (in the Gardens of Pusey House)
- 1982: Euripides' Ion (at Lady Margaret Hall)
- 1984: Euripides' Hippolytus (in the gardens of Wadham College); performed in a double bill with Aristophanes' The Clouds' (the latter in English)
- 1993: Sophocles' The Women of Trachis; performed in a double bill with Aristophanes' Frogs (the latter in English)
- 1996: Euripides' Hecuba
- 1999: Euripides' Iphigenia at Aulis; performed in a double bill with Aristophanes' Birds (the latter in English)
- 2002: Euripides' Medea
- 2005: Euripides' Orestes
- 2008: Aeschylus' Agamemnon
- 2011: Aeschylus' Choephori (entitled Clytemnestra)
- 2014: Aeschylus' Eumenides (entitled The Furies)
- 2017: Euripides' Bacchae
- 2021: Euripides’ Orestes (online)
- 2023: Euripides’ Medea

== Other dramatic productions ==
As well as the triennial Greek Play, the Society has occasionally run other productions in the past, although it now prefers to partially fund productions that are run separately from the Committee (although Committee members are often involved as individuals). Past productions have included:

- 1980: Plautus' Rudens (in the Cloister Gardens of Wadham College)
- 1981: Sophocles' Ajax (in the Chapel of Exeter College)
- 1985: Sophocles' Oedipus at Colonus (at Magdalen College)
- 1990: Terence's Adelphoe (in the Lindsay Room of Balliol College)
- 1996: Aristophanes' Thesmophoriazousai (entitled Euripides and the Women; at the Oxford Playhouse)
- 1997: Euripides' Hippolytus (in the gardens of Magdalen College)
- 2004: Euripides' Trojan Women (at the Oxford Playhouse, as part of the Oxford Greek Festival)
- 2004: Menander's Aspis (at the Burton Taylor, as part of the Oxford Greek Festival)
- 2013: Plautus' Miles Gloriosus (at the Ashmolean Museum, as part of the first 'Live Friday')
