= Prosopopoeia =

Rhetorical device

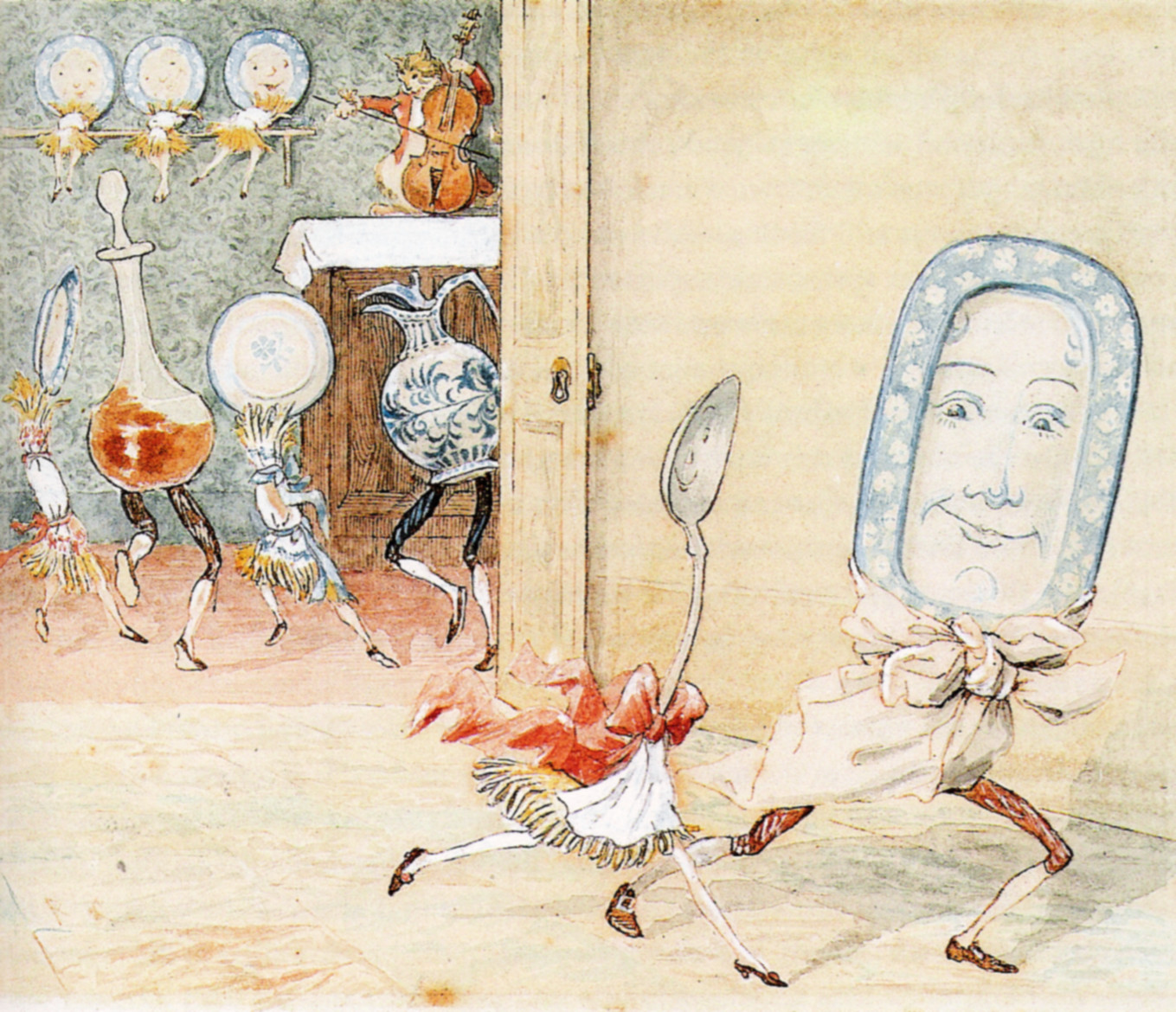

A prosopopoeia (Ancient Greek: προσωποποιία, /prɒsoʊpoʊˈpiːə/) is a rhetorical device in which a non-human element speaks or is spoken to as a human. The term derives from the Greek words prósopon (transl. face, person) and poiéin (transl. to make, to do).

This term also refers to a figure of speech in which an animal or inanimate object is ascribed human characteristics or is spoken of in anthropomorphic language. Quintilian writes of the power of this figure of speech to "bring down the gods from heaven, evoke the dead, and give voices to cities and states" (Institutes of Oratory Book IX Chapter 2).

Prosopopoeiae are used mostly to give another perspective on the action being described. For example, in Cicero's Pro Caelio, Cicero speaks as Appius Claudius Caecus, a stern old man. This serves to give the "ancient" perspective on the actions of the plaintiff. Prosopopoeiae can also be used to take some of the load off the communicator by placing an unfavorable point of view on the shoulders of an imaginary stereotype. The audience's reactions are predisposed to go towards this figment rather than the communicator himself.

Another notable example of prosopopoeia occurs in Book II of Paradise Lost by John Milton, where the poet gives voice to Sin and Death, two abstract concepts that are personified and speak as characters in the narrative.

== See also ==
- Anthropomorphism
