= The Wasps =

Comedy by Aristophanes

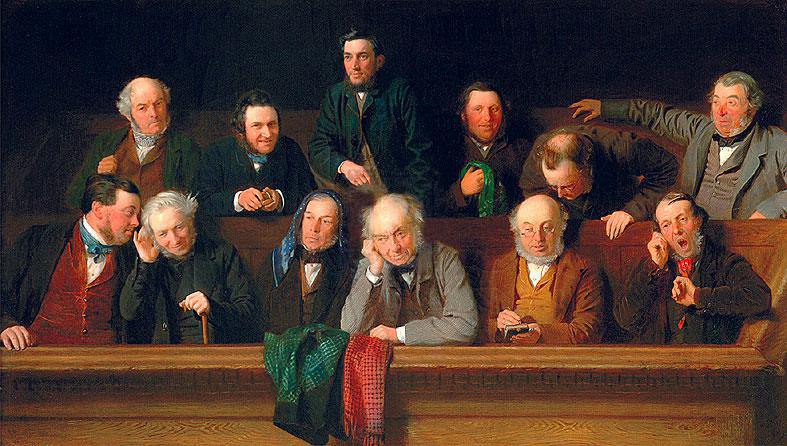
- The Chorus in The Wasps comprises elderly jurors who briefly resemble wasps in their behaviour (Painting: 'The Jury' by John Morgan 1861, Bucks County Museum, England). The Dramatis Personae in ancient comedy depends on interpretation of textual evidence. This list is based on David Barrett's translation.
- Written by: Aristophanes
- Chorus: Wasps (old men); Boys
- Characters: Anticleon (Bdelycleon) a young Athenian; Procleon (Philocleon) his father; Sosias their household slave; Xanthias another household slave; First Dog; A reveller; A baking-woman; A citizen; Silent Roles: Midas household slave; Phryx household slave; Masyntias household slave; Second Dog (Labes); Dardanis flute girl; Chaerephon the philosopher; Witnesses brought by the Citizen; Cooking utensils witnesses at trial of Second Dog; Puppies children to Second Dog; Revellers; Three sons of Carcinus
- Setting: before house of Anticleon

The Wasps (Classical Greek: Σφῆκες, romanized: Sphēkes) is the fourth in chronological order of the eleven surviving plays by Aristophanes. It was produced at the Lenaia festival in 422 BC, during Athens' short-lived respite from the Peloponnesian War and shortly before the death of Cleon.

The Wasps follows a son's attempt to stop his father from constantly serving jury duties as it is detrimental to his father's health. It also serves as a parody of Cleon; a figure Aristophanes was publicly critical of. He also ridicules the law courts, one of the institutions that provided Cleon his power. The play has been thought to exemplify the dramatic style of Greek Old Comedy.

== Historical background ==
=== Peloponnesian War ===
- 431: The Peloponnesian War commenced. Many of Aristophanes' plays respond to the war, such as The Acharnians, Peace, and Lysistrata.
- 425: Athens obtained a significant victory against Sparta in the Battle of Sphacteria and Cleon claimed responsibility for it.
- 423: Athens and Sparta agreed to a one-year truce. It was during this truce that Aristophanes wrote Peace, while the Peace of Niceas was being debated.
- 422: The Wasps is first performed at the Lenaia festival during the pause in hostilities.

=== Athenian jury system ===
Constitutionally, supreme power lay with the people as voters in the assembly and as jurors in the courts, but they could be manipulated by demagogues skilled in oratory and supported by networks of satellites and informers. Jurors had to be citizens over the age of thirty and a corps of 6,000 was enrolled at the beginning of each year. The work was voluntary but time-consuming and they were paid a small fee: three obols per day at the time of The Wasps. For many jurors, this was their major source of income and it was virtually an old-age pension. There were no judges to provide juries with legal guidance, and there was no legal appeal against a jury's verdict. Jurors came under the sway of litigious politicians like Cleon who provided them with cases to try and who were influential in persuading the Assembly to keep up their pay.

=== Cleon ===
During Aristophanes' life, Cleon was the demagogue of Athens. Aristophanes often criticized powerful figures in his plays, and Cleon was no exception, most notably in The Wasps.

Two years before The Wasps was first performed, Athens had obtained a significant victory against its rival, Sparta, in the Battle of Sphacteria. Most Athenians credited Cleon with the victory. Cleon had succeeded Pericles as the dominant speaker in the assembly, and increasingly he could manipulate the courts for political and personal ends, especially in the prosecution of public officials for mismanagement of their duties.

The Wasps is not the first time Aristophanes criticized Cleon through the theatre. Cleon had previously attempted to prosecute Aristophanes for slandering the polis with his second play The Babylonians, and though the legal result of these efforts is unknown, they appear to have sharpened the poet's satirical edge, as evidenced later in the unrelenting attack on Cleon in The Knights. The second parabasis in The Wasps implies that Cleon retaliated for his drubbing in The Knights with yet further efforts to intimidate or prosecute Aristophanes, and the poet may have publicly yielded to this pressure for a short time.

== Plot ==
=== Synopsis ===
The Wasps follows Bdelycleon's efforts to convince his father Philocleon to change his ways and stop spending all of his time as a juryman. When trapping Philocleon in the house with nets doesn't work, Bdelycleon debates his father, winning over the favor of the chorus. To make his father feel better, Bdelycleon holds a domestic complaint trial within the house. Philocleon is distressed by its outcome of acquittal, but his son tries to cheer him up by taking him to a party. While at the party, Philocleon becomes incredibly drunk and angers the community. The audience is warned of becoming too stuck in their ways, and what blind worship of Cleon leads to as the play concludes with Philocleon leading the cast in a spirited dance.

=== Summary ===
The Wasps opens in front of a house covered with a large net. It is guarded by two slaves, Sosias and Xanthias (the latter of whom is asleep). Bdelycleon, their master, is positioned on the roof but he too is asleep. The two slaves wake and we learn from their banter that they are keeping guard over an "animal." Xanthias addresses the audience, explaining that their master is a very important man who has tasked them with guarding his father who has an unusual disease. Xanthias and Sosias challenge the audience to guess the nature of the disease. Addictions to gambling, drink and good times are suggested but they are all wrong—the father is addicted to the law court: he is a phileliastes (φιληλιαστής) or a "trialophile." The symptoms of the old man's addiction include irregular sleep, obsessional thinking, paranoia, poor hygiene and hoarding. Counselling, medical treatment and travel have all failed to solve the problem, and now Bdelycleon has turned the house into a prison by covering it in nets to keep the old man away from the law courts.

Bdelycleon wakes and he shouts to the two slaves to be on their guard—his father is moving about. He tells them to watch the drains, for the old man can move like a mouse, but Philocleon surprises them all by emerging instead from the chimney disguised as smoke. Bdelycleon is luckily on hand to push him back inside. Philocleon is desperate to escape, as he was once told by an Delphic oracle that if he ever let an accused man go free, he would die of consumption. He tries to get out by chewing through the nets and trickery, which fails. The household settles down for some more sleep after discussing how they can fend off the other jurors who may come and fetch Philocleon. Then the Chorus (costumed as wasps) arrives. They are the old jurors who move warily through the muddy roads and are escorted by boys with lamps through the dark. Philocleon appears and informs them of his imprisonment. The Chorus asks if there is a way he can escape from Bdelycleon, and after some discussion, he chews a hole through one of the nets and climbs down from his window. Despite his attempts to be quiet, this wakes Bdelycleon and Xanthias up. Philocleon calls for the defense of The Chorus who swarm around Bdelycleon and his slaves like wasps. The Chorus accuses Bdelycleon of tyranny for keeping his father away from the courts, Bdelycleon responds that tyranny is thrown around as an accusation too much. At the end of this fray, Philocleon is still barely in his son's custody and both sides are willing to settle the issue peacefully through debate. If Bdelycleon wins, The Chorus says that it will be over for all old men, who will be seen only as useless. Philocleon swears to fall on his own sword if he loses.

The debate between the Philocleon and Bdelycleon focuses on the advantages that the old man personally derives from voluntary jury service. Philocleon says he enjoys the flattering attentions of rich and powerful men who appeal to him for a favourable verdict, he enjoys the freedom to interpret the law as he pleases since his decisions are not subject to review, and his juror's pay gives him independence and authority within his own household. Bdelycleon responds to these points with the argument that jurors are in fact subject to the demands of petty officials and they get paid less than they deserve—revenues from the empire go mostly into the private treasuries of men like Cleon. These arguments have a paralyzing effect on Philocleon. The chorus is won over to Bdelycleon's side.

Philocleon refuses to give up his old ways, so Bdelycleon offers to turn the house into a courtroom and to pay him a juror's fee to judge domestic disputes. Philocleon agrees, and a case is soon brought before him—a dispute between the household dogs. One dog (who looks like Cleon) accuses the other dog (who looks like Laches) of stealing a Sicilian cheese and not sharing it. Witnesses for the defense include a bowl, a pestle, a cheese-grater, a brazier and a pot. As these are unable to speak, Bdelycleon says a few words for them on behalf of the accused. Philocleon is not softened, but his son easily fools him into putting his vote into the urn for acquittal by misdirecting his hand. Philocleon is shocked by the pronouncement that Labes is acquitted and faints. He worries what will become of him now that he no longer convicts those brought before him, but his son promises him food and drink and they exit the stage to prepare for some entertainment.

While the actors are offstage, the Chorus addresses the audience in a conventional parabasis. It praises the author for standing up to monsters like Cleon and it chastises the audience for its failure to appreciate the merits of the author's previous play (The Clouds). It encourages the audience to value poets more in the future and to treasure the wisdom they give. It praises the older generation, evokes memories of the victory at Marathon, and bitterly deplores the gobbling up of imperial revenues by unworthy men.

Father and son then return to the stage, now arguing with each other over the old man's choice of attire. He is addicted to his old juryman's cloak and his old shoes, and he is suspicious of the Persian tunic and the Spartan footwear that Bdelycleon wants him to wear that evening to a sophisticated dinner party. The fancy clothes are forced upon him, and he is instructed in the kind of manners and conversation that the other guests will expect of him. At the party, Philocleon declares his reluctance to drink any wine—it causes trouble, he says—but Bdelycleon assures him that sophisticated men of the world can easily talk their way out of trouble, and so they depart optimistically for the evening's entertainment.

There is then a second parabasis (see Note at end of this section), in which the Chorus touches briefly on a conflict between Cleon and the author. After which, Xanthias arrives with news for the audience about the old man's appalling behavior at the dinner party: Philocleon has got himself abusively drunk, he has insulted all his son's fashionable friends, and now he is assaulting anyone he meets on the way home. Xanthias departs as Philocleon arrives, now with aggrieved victims on his heels and a pretty flute girl on his arm. Bdelycleon appears moments later and angrily remonstrates with his father for kidnapping the flute girl from the party. Philocleon pretends that she is in fact a torch. His son isn't fooled, and he tries to take the girl back to the party by force, but his father knocks him down. Other people with grievances against Philocleon continue to arrive, demanding compensation and threatening legal action. The first is the Baker's Wife, who accuses Philocleon of knocking over 10 loaves of bread with his torch and threatens to summon him before the market instructors for what he has done. A badly bruised man approaches Philocleon next and accuses him of outrage. He makes an ironic attempt to talk his way out of trouble like a sophisticated man of the world, but it inflames the situation further. Finally, his alarmed son drags him indoors. The Chorus sings briefly about how difficult it is for men to change their habits, and it commends the son for filial devotion. Philocleon returns to the stage dressed as the Polyphemus from Euripedes' Cyclops and begins dancing, which others comment on in a concerned manner. He competes in dancing against the sons of Carcinus dressed as crabs. The chorus declines to join, ending the play by allowing Philocleon and the sons of Carcinus to dance off the stage.

(Note: Some editors (such as Barrett) exchange the second parabasis (lines 1265–91) with the song (lines 1450–73) in which Bdelycleon is commended for filial devotion.)

== Scholarship ==
Some scholars regard The Wasps as one of the greatest comedies in literature. Various factors contribute to its appeal, as for example:

- The central figure, Philocleon, is a 'triumph of characterization';
- The jurors have been considered the most vividly realized Chorus in Old Comedy;
- The juror's son has been viewed as the most lifelike child in Greek drama.

=== Names ===
Philocleon's name means lover of Cleon, reflective of his love for the jury system and status as a follower of Cleon. Bdelycleon means the opposite, or anti to lover of Cleon. Some scholars additionally interpret Bdelycleon's name to mean lover of the people, as that, in Aristophanes' view was equivalent to hater of Cleon.

The dog accused of stealing Sicilian cheese's name is Labes, a parody of the name Laches. Laches was accused by Cleon of embezzling funds from Sicily, reflected in the accusation of the cheese theft.

=== Philocleon ===
Philocleon is a complex character whose actions have comic significance, psychological significance and allegorical significance. When, for example, he strikes his son for taking the dancing girl away, the violence is comic because it is unexpected of an old man yet it is psychologically appropriate because he is struggling to overcome an addiction and it represents in allegorical form the theme expressed by the Chorus in the parabasis: the old customs are better and more manly than the new fashions. The debilitating effects of old age and the dehumanizing effects of an addiction (Philocleon is said to resemble a jackdaw, a mouse, a limpet, smoke, a donkey's foal, a cut of meat, Odysseus and Nobody) are somber themes that lift the action beyond the scope of a mere farce.

The scholar Robert Cowan argues that Philocleon's journey and arc throughout the play are meant to be reflections of stages of life for an Athenian man. His strength and vigor at the beginning are representative of a young man. Philocleon's involvement in debate with his adult son place him as simply a man. His declining state as he dances to close The Wasps is indicative of the effects of aging.

=== Interactions with Oresteia ===
Aeschylus' Oresteia was first performed 36 years before Aristophanes' The Wasps, and some classicists believe that Aristophanes was parodying the trilogy in his play due to several parallels in their structure and imagery.

Both The Wasps and Agamemnon begin with two side characters taking a night watch and explaining to the audience the circumstances with which the play begins. The trial between the two household dogs in the second half of the play follows a similar structure to the trial in Eumenides, the third play in The Oresteia.

The cloak scene after the trial in The Wasps draws the closest connection to what Aristophanes' was trying to say by parodying Eumenides and The Oresteia as a whole. Bdelycleon forcing his father to change his cloak mirrors Erinyes' costume change after the trial at the center of Euminedes. Both of these costume changes are meant to signal a transformation of character in the eyes of the audience. Unlike in Euminedes, Philocleon's transformation doesn't take hold, and his mishaps at the dinner party only reinforce his comic reputation in the play. By undercutting this audience expectation, Aristophanes is arguing against the cut and dry morals of Greek tragedy.

== Old Comedy ==
The Wasps has been thought to exemplify all the conventions of Old Comedy at their best – structural elements that are common to most of Aristophanes' plays are all found in this play in a complete and readily identifiable form. The table below is based on one scholar's interpretation of the play's structural elements and the poetic meters associated with them.

Dramatic and Metrical Structure Key: Brackets [ ] enclose metrons comprising long syllables (-), short syllables (.) and long/short syllables (o). The metrical scheme thus depicted is idealized and does not include substitutions such as a tribrach (...) for an iamb (.-).
Elements	Lines	Metres	Summary	Comments
Prologue	1–229	iambic trimeter	Dialogue setting the scene.	conventional opening [o-.-] [o-.-] [o-.-] line 1
Parodos	230–47	iambic tetrameter catalectic	Chorus enters escorted by boys.	[o-.-] [o-.-] [o-.-] [o--](trochees are more usual in early plays e.g. Acharnians, Knights, Peace) line 230
	248–72	Euripidean 14 syllables/line	Dialogue between juror and boy.	a quicker form of iambic rhythm [o-.-] [o-.-] [-.-.--] line 248
	273–89	complex meter	Chorus wonders about Philocleon.	a strophe/antistrophe pair based on ionic metron [..--] but with many variations line 273
	290–316	as before but simpler	Dialogue between juror and boy.	strophe/antistrophe, ionic [..--] but with fewer variations. line 290
Song	317–33	complex	Solo lament by Philocleon.	mainly choriamb [-..-] to 323 then anapests [..-], reflecting a change in mood. line 317
Symmetrical scene (possibly an agon)	334–44 & 365–402	trochaic and anapestic tetrameter catalectic	Angry dialogue between actors and chorus.	each half beginning with trochaic tetrameter [-.-o] [-.-o] [-.-o] [-.-] e.g. 334–45 and ending with anapestic tetrameter [..-..-] [..-..-] [..-..-] [..--] e.g. 346–57 but with 1 anapestic pnigos added (358–64) line 334
Symmetrical scene	403–60 & 461–525	mainly trochaic tetrameter catalectic	Denunciations and skirmish.	trochaic tetrameters [-.-o] [-.-o] [-.-o] [-.-] but with trochaic dimeters or 'runs' added. line 403
Agon	526–630 & 631–724	songs and anapestic tetrameter catalectic	Debate between father and son.	strophe (526–45) and antistrophe (631–47) with iambic [.-] and choriambic [-..-] metra; spoken sections in anapestic tetrameter ending in anapestic pnigoi (546–630 & 648–724) line 526
Song	725–59	anapests, iambs and dochmiacs	Reflections on debate.	anapestic lines 725–28, 736–42, 750–59, other lines in iambs and dochmiacs [o--.-] or [o..-.-] line 725
Episode	760–862	iambic trimeter	Setting up a court at home.	dialogue in iambic trimeter [o-.-] [o-.-] [o-.-] line 760
Song	863–90	mostly anapests	Prayer consecrating the new court.	iambic trimeter in 868-69 & 885–86; short strophe (870–74) and antistrophe (887–90) largely in iambs; anapests in 863–67 & 875–84 line 863
Episode	891–1008	iambic trimeter	The dog's trial.	dialogue in iambic trimeter [o-.-] [o-.-] [o-.-] line 890
Parabasis	1009–14	mixed	Kommation	anapestic (1009–10), iambic (1011–12) and trochaic (1013–14) – an unusual lead into a parabasis line 1009
	1015–59	anapests	Parabasis proper with pnigos.	anapestic tetrameter catalectic [..-..-] [..-..-] [..-..-] [..--] ending in anapestic pnigos line 1015
	1060–121	trochees	Symmetrical scene.	trochaic strophe (1060–70) and antistrophe (1091–101); epirrhema (1071–90) and antepirrhema (1102–21) in trochaic tetrameter catalectic [-.-o] [-.-o] [-.-o] [-.-] line 1060
Episode	1122–264	iambic trimeter	Preparations for dinner party.	dialogue between actors in iambic trimeter [o-.-] [o-.-] [o-.-] line 1120
Second Parabasis	1265–91	trochaic	symmetrical scene	trochaic strophe(1265–74) but missing an antistrophe; epirrhema (1275–83) and antepirrhema (1284–91) featuring variation on trochaic tetrameter catalectic [-...] [-...] [-...] [-.-] (paeonic tetrameter) line 1265
Episode	1292–449	mostly iambic trimeter	Farcical consequences of the dinner party.	dialogue in iambic trimeter but with trochaic passages (1326–31, 1335–40) spoken by the drunken Philocleon line 1292
Song	1450–73	mostly iambs and choriambs	Chorus congratulates father and son.	first half of strophe and antistrophe iambo-choriambic lines [o-.-] [-..-] (1450–56, 1462–68), the second half more complex line 1450
Exodos	1474–537	iambic and archilochean	Philocleon dances.	dialogue in iambic trimeter ending in a dance (1518–37) in archilocheans ([o-..-..-o] [-.-.--]) line 1470

== Adaptions ==
- In 1909, the English composer Ralph Vaughan Williams created popular incidental music for the play – see The Wasps (Vaughan Williams).
- In 2025, an English language film adaptation was released.

== Translations ==
- William James Hickie, 1853 – prose, full text
- Benjamin B. Rogers, 1924 – verse, full text
- Arthur S. Way, 1934 – verse
- Eugene O'Neill, 1938—prose, full text.
- Douglass Parker, 1962 – verse
- Alan H. Sommerstein, 1983 – prose and verse
- Unknown translator – prose: full text
- Peter Meineck, 1998 – prose
- George Theodoridis, 2007 – prose: full text
- The Atticist, 2018 – prose and verse with commentary: full text
- Moses Hadas: available for digital loan

== See also ==
- Ecclesia (ancient Greece)
- Theatre of ancient Greece
- Dionysia
