= Palinode =

Poetic ode

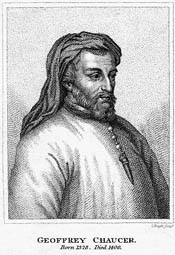
Geoffrey Chaucer was an exponent of the palinode.

A palinode or palinody is an ode in which the writer retracts a view or sentiment expressed in an earlier poem. The first recorded use of a palinode is in a poem by Stesichorus in the 7th century BC, in which he retracts his earlier statement that the Trojan War was all the fault of Helen.

An important example of a palinode is that of Socrates in the Phaedrus in which his first major speech disparages the "mania" of Eros and its part in human affairs, while his second one (commonly known as the palinode of Socrates) praises Eros. As he says, "we must not let anyone disturb us or frighten us with the claim that you should prefer a friend who is in control of himself to one who is disturbed. Besides proving that point, if [the lover of speeches] is to win his case, our opponent must show that love is not sent by the gods as a benefit to a lover and his boy. And we, for our part, must prove the opposite, that this sort of madness is given us by the gods to ensure our greatest good fortune. It will be a proof that convinces the wise if not the clever."

The word comes from the Greek παλινῳδία from πάλιν (palin, meaning 'back' or 'again') and ᾠδή ("song"); the Latin-derived equivalent "recantation" is an exact calque (re- meaning 'back or 'again' and cant- meaning 'sing').

It can also be a recantation of a defamatory statement in Scots Law.

== Examples ==
Chaucer's Retraction is one example of a palinode.

In 1895, Gelett Burgess wrote his famous poem, the Purple Cow:

I never saw a purple cow.
I never hope to see one.
But I can tell you anyhow
I'd rather see than be one.

Later in his life, he followed it with this palinode:

Ah yes, I wrote the purple cow!
I’m sorry now I wrote it!
But I can tell you anyhow,
I’ll kill you if you quote it!

Ogden Nash wrote a palinode in relation to his most famous poem about the dandiness of candy, and quickness of liquor:

Nothing makes me sicker
than liquor
and candy
is too expandy

Palinodes have also been created by many writers such as Horace (see Epodes (Horace), Augustine of Hippo, Bede, Giraldus Cambrensis, Jean de Meun, Andreas Capellanus, Guittone d'Arezzo, and others.
