= Aelius Theon =

1st century AD Greek sophist and author

Aelius Theon (Ancient Greek: Αἴλιος Θέων, gen.: Θέωνος) was an Alexandrian sophist and author of a collection of preliminary exercises (progymnasmata) for the training of orators. He probably lived and wrote in the mid to late 1st century AD and his treatise is the earliest treatment of these exercises.

The work (extant, though incomplete), which probably formed an appendix to a manual of rhetoric, shows learning and taste, and contains valuable notices on the style and speeches of the masters of Attic oratory. Theon also wrote commentaries on Xenophon, Isocrates and Demosthenes, and treatises on style. He is to be distinguished from the Stoic Theon, who lived in the time of Augustus and also wrote on rhetoric.
