= Nunn (surname) =

Surname list

Nunn is a surname. Notable people with the surname include:

- Alf Nunn (1899–1946), English footballer
- Alice Nunn (1927–1988), American actress
- Andrew Nunn (born 1957), British Anglican priest
- Anthony Nunn (1927–2025), British field hockey player
- Aubrey Nunn (born 1966), English bass guitarist, songwriter and producer
- Beau Nunn (born 1995), American football player
- Ben Nunn (born 1989), English footballer
- Bill Nunn (1953–2016), American actor
- Bill Nunn (American football) (1924–2014), American journalist and football scout
- Bill Nunn (Australian footballer) (1951–2022), Australian rules footballer
- Bill Nunn (politician) (born 1932), Australian politician
- Bobby Nunn (doo-wop musician) (1925–1986), American R&B singer
- Bobby Nunn (R&B musician) (born 1952), American R&B producer, songwriter and vocalist
- Brooke Nunn (born 1993), English footballer
- Bunny Nunn (1927–2008), Australian soccer player
- Cedric Nunn (born 1957), South African photographer and educator
- Charlie Nunn (born 1971), British banker
- Chris Nunn (born 1958), Australian athletics coach
- Christine Nunn (born 1991), Australian squash player
- Christopher Nunn (born 1983), British photographer
- David Nunn (actor) (1962–2012), British actor
- David A. Nunn (1833–1918), American politician from Tennessee
- Ellie Nunn (born 1991), English actress, daughter of Trevor Nunn
- Eric Nunn, Australian soccer player
- Ernie Nunn (1904–1991), Australian rules footballer
- Freddie Joe Nunn (born 1962), American football player
- Frederick Nunn (c.1837–1870), English cricketer
- Gary P. Nunn (born 1945), American country music singer-songwriter
- George Nunn (born 2001), British footballer
- Glynis Nunn (born 1960), Australian heptathlete
- Horace Nunn (1891–1957), New Zealand rugby union and rugby league footballer
- Howie Nunn (1935–2012), American baseball player
- James Nunn (artist) (born 1973), British illustrator and print maker
- James G. Nunn (bishop), American Methodist bishop
- Jean Nunn (1916–1982), British civil servant
- John Nunn (born 1955), English chess grandmaster and writer
- John Nunn (cricketer) (1906–1987), English cricketer
- John Nunn (race walker) (born 1978), American race walker
- John Nunn (RAF officer) (1919–2013), British Royal Air Force officer, mathematician and politician
- John Nunn (rower) (born 1942), American rower
- John Nunn (sailor) (1803–1860), English sailor and author
- John F. Nunn (1925–2022), British physician
- Joseph Nunn (1905–1968), American engineer
- Joseph Clyde Nunn (1908–1970), Canadian broadcaster and political figure from Nova Scotia
- Joshua Nunn (1853–1908), Irish-born veterinarian and barrister in India and South Africa
- Judy Nunn (born 1945), Australian actress and author
- Kem Nunn (born 1948), American novelist
- Kendrick Nunn (born 1995), American basketball player
- L. L. Nunn (1853–1925), American entrepreneur and educator
- Laurie Nunn (born 1986), English screenwriter and playwright
- Les Nunn (born 1942), Australian water polo player
- Louie Nunn (1924–2004), American politician from Kentucky
- Malla Nunn (born 1963), Swaziland-born Australian writer, screenwriter and director
- Marianne Nunn (1778–1847), British hymn writer
- Matt Nunn (media executive) (born 1972), Australian media executive and basketball player and coach
- Matt Nunn (politician) (born 1978), American politician
- Merlin Nunn (1930–2020), Canadian judge and government official
- Michael Nunn (born 1963), American boxer
- Michael Nunn (dancer) (born 1967), British ballet dancer and choreographer
- Michelle Nunn (born 1966), American philanthropic executive and politician
- Mo Nunn (1938–2018), English engineer and motor racing team owner
- Natalie Nunn (born 1984), American reality television personality
- Nathan Nunn (born 1974), Canadian economist
- Patrick Nunn (born 1969), English composer
- Paul Nunn (1943–1995), English mountaineer, author and economic historian
- Percy Nunn (1870–1944), British educationalist
- Robert Nunn (American football) (born 1965), American football coach
- Robert Nunn (songwriter) (1808–1853), English singer and songwriter from Tyneside
- Robert Morris-Nunn (born 1949), Australian architect
- Ronnie Nunn, American basketball referee
- Sam Nunn (born 1938), American businessman and politician
- Sam Nunn (rower) (born 1996), British rower
- Susan C. Karant-Nunn, American historian
- Steve Nunn (born 1952), American politician
- Terrence Nunn (born 1986), American football player
- Terri Nunn (born 1961), American singer and actress
- Thomas Nunn (1846–1889), Australian cricketer
- Thomas Hancock Nunn (1859–1937), English social reformer
- Trevor Nunn (born 1940), English theatre and film director
- Veronica Nunn (born 1957), American jazz singer
- Wally Nunn (1920–1965), English footballer
- William Nunn (1879–1971), British politician
- Zach Nunn (born 1979), American politician and United States Air Force officer from Iowa

== See also ==
- Nunn (disambiguation)
- Neno (name)
