= Robert Nunn =

Robert or Bobby Nunn may refer to:

- Robert Nunn (American football) (born 1965), American football defensive line coach
- Bobby Nunn (doo-wop musician) (1925–1986), American singer with The Robins and The Coasters
- Bobby Nunn (R&B musician), American R&B producer, songwriter and vocalist
- Robert Nunn (songwriter) (1808–1853), Tyneside singer and songwriter

== See also ==
- Nunn (surname)
