= Eats, Shoots & Leaves =

2003 non-fiction book on punctuation by Lynne Truss

Eats, Shoots & Leaves: The Zero Tolerance Approach to Punctuation
- Author: Lynne Truss
- Cover artist: James Nunn
- Language: English
- Subject: English grammar
- Publisher: Profile Books
- Publication date: 6 November 2003
- Publication place: United Kingdom
- Media type: Print (hardcover)
- Pages: 228 pp.
- ISBN: 978-1-86197-612-3
- OCLC: 55019487
- Dewey Decimal: 428.2 22
- LC Class: PE1450 .T75 2003

Eats, Shoots & Leaves: The Zero Tolerance Approach to Punctuation is a non-fiction book written by Lynne Truss, the former host of BBC Radio 4's Cutting a Dash programme. In the book, published in 2003, Truss bemoans the state of punctuation in the United Kingdom and the United States and describes how rules are being relaxed in today's society. Her goal is to remind readers of the importance of punctuation in the English language by mixing humour and instruction.

Truss dedicates the book "to the memory of the striking Bolshevik printers of St. Petersburg who, in 1905, demanded to be paid the same rate for punctuation marks as for letters, and thereby directly precipitated the first Russian Revolution". She added this dedication as an afterthought after remembering the factoid when reading one of her radio plays.

== Overview ==
There is one chapter each on apostrophes; commas; semicolons and colons; exclamation marks, question marks and quotation marks; italic type, dashes, brackets, ellipses and emoticons; and hyphens. Truss touches on varied aspects of the history of punctuation and includes many anecdotes. Contrary to usual publishing practice, the US edition of the book left the original British conventions intact.

== Title ==
The title of the book is a syntactic ambiguity‍—‌a verbal fallacy arising from an ambiguous or erroneous grammatical construction‍—‌and derived from a joke popularised by Ursula Le Guin in her 1998 book Steering the Craft (a variant on a "bar joke") about bad punctuation:

A panda walks into a café. He orders a sandwich, eats it, then draws a gun and fires two shots in the air.

"Why?" asks the confused waiter, as the panda makes towards the exit. The panda produces a badly punctuated wildlife manual and tosses it over his shoulder.

"I'm a panda," he says at the door. "Look it up."

The waiter turns to the relevant entry in the manual and, sure enough, finds an explanation.

"Panda. Large black-and-white bear-like mammal, native to China. Eats, shoots and leaves."

The joke turns on the ambiguity of the final sentence fragment. As intended by the author, "eats" is a verb, while "shoots" and "leaves" are the verb's objects: a panda's diet consists of shoots and leaves. However, the erroneous introduction of the comma gives the mistaken impression that the sentence fragment comprises three verbs listing in sequence the panda's characteristic conduct: it eats, then it shoots, and finally it leaves.

== Reception ==
The book was a commercial success. In 2004, the US edition became a New York Times best-seller. In a 2004 review, Louis Menand of The New Yorker pointed out several dozen punctuation errors in the book, including one in the dedication, and wrote that "an Englishwoman lecturing Americans on semicolons is a little like an American lecturing the French on sauces. Some of Truss's departures from punctuation norms are just British laxness."

In The Fight for English: How Language Pundits Ate, Shot and Left (Oxford University Press, 2006), linguist David Crystal analyses the linguistic purism of Truss and other writers through the ages. In 2006, English lecturer Nicholas Waters released Eats, Roots & Leaves, criticising the "grammar fascists" who "want to stop the language moving into the 21st century". This view was shared by dyslexic English comedian and satirist Marcus Brigstocke in a 2007 episode of Room 101, in which he blames Truss's book for starting off a trend in which people have become "grammar bullies".

== Editions ==
- Eats, Shoots & Leaves (UK hardcover ed.). London: Profile Books. 2003. ISBN 1-86197-612-7.
- Eats, Shoots & Leaves (US hardcover ed.). New York: Gotham Books. 2004. ISBN 1-59240-087-6.
- Eats, Shoots & Leaves (Paperback, special Indian ed.). London: Profile Books. 2004. ISBN 1-86197-612-7.
- Eats, Shoots & Leaves (Paperback with Punctuation Repair Kit ed.). New York: Gotham Books. 2006. ISBN 1-59240-203-8.
- Eats, Shoots & Leaves. Illustrated by Pat Byrnes (Illustrated ed.). New York: Gotham Books. 2008. ISBN 978-1-59240-391-2.

In July 2006, Putnam Juvenile published a 32-page follow-up for children entitled Eats, Shoots & Leaves: Why, Commas Really Do Make a Difference!. Based on the same concept, this version covers only the section on comma usage and uses cartoons to explain the problems presented by their poor usage.

== See also ==
- Der Dativ ist dem Genitiv sein Tod
- Linguistic prescription
- Standard English
