= Nunn =

Nunn may refer to:

- Nunn (surname)
- Alan Nunn May (1911–2003), English physicist
- Nunn, Colorado, United States
- Nunn (crater), a lunar impact crater

== See also ==
- None (disambiguation)
- Nun (disambiguation)
- Richard Nunns (1945–2021), New Zealand traditional instrumentalist
