= None =

None most often refers to:

- Zero, the mathematical concept of the quantity "none"
- Empty set, the mathematical concept of the collection of things represented by "none"
- none, an indefinite pronoun in the English language

None may also refer to:

== Music ==
- None (Meshuggah EP), 1994
- None (Cloak of Altering EP), 2016

== Other uses ==
- None (liturgy), the ninth hour of the traditional Christian liturgy
- None, Piedmont, a commune in the province of Turin in the Italian region of Piedmont
- Irreligion, a lack of religious affiliation
- None of the above, a political expression for rejecting all available candidates
- None, the keyword for the null pointer in Python

== See also ==
- Nones (disambiguation)
- Nothing (disambiguation)
- Zero (disambiguation)
- Nun (disambiguation)
- Nunn (disambiguation)
