= Richard William Beaty =

Irish music teacher, composer and organist

Richard William Beaty (c.1799–1883) was an Irish music teacher, composer and organist. He is now known for Tenderness, a popular hymn tune of the 19th century.

== Life ==
He was the son of William Beaty, born in Dublin, and was educated at Christ Church Cathedral, Dublin. He was appointed organist and musical instructor at the Molyneux Asylum for Blind Women, Dublin, around 1824.

Beaty lived in Blessington Street, Dublin. He preached and was organist of the Free Church, Great Charles Street, Dublin from 1828 to 1877. His successor as organist was his pupil Richard Harrison. He was master of the choristers in Christ Church Cathedral from February 1830, where he had been deputising for the absent Walter Hamerton; he resigned the post in 1872. Another of his pupils was the musician Robert Prescott Stewart. He died in Dublin, 1883.

== Works ==
- The hymns and psalms ... as sung in the Magdalen Asylum Leeson Street (1825), David Weyman, revision by Beaty
- One hundred and fifty hymns (1844)
- Sequel to Melodia Sacra, vol. III, hymns by Thomas Kelly, with J. Smith, R. P. Stewart and J. Rambaut

He composed the tune Tenderness, sometimes called "Caritas". The attribution to Beaty was by George Arthur Crawford, who wrote a Biographical Index to the Church Hymnal of the Church of Ireland. The tune was originally composed for the children of a school set up in 1825 in Summerhill, a district of Northside, Dublin, with support from Viscountess Harberton.

In the 1894 Church Hymnal by R. P. Stewart, Caritas is given as the alternate tune to Marianne Nunn's version of the hymn One there is above all others, from the original by John Newton. Stewart dates the composition as from 1830. With the propagation of hymns and tunes through hymnals, Beaty's connection with the tune was kept, but his biographical details were lost: see 447 (One is kind above all others, a variant of Nunn's words) in the Handbook to the Mennonite Hymnary (1949).
