= Free Church, Great Charles Street, Dublin =

Former free, then Church of Ireland, church

Coordinates: 53.357351°N 6.254349°W

- Free Church, Great Charles Street, Dublin
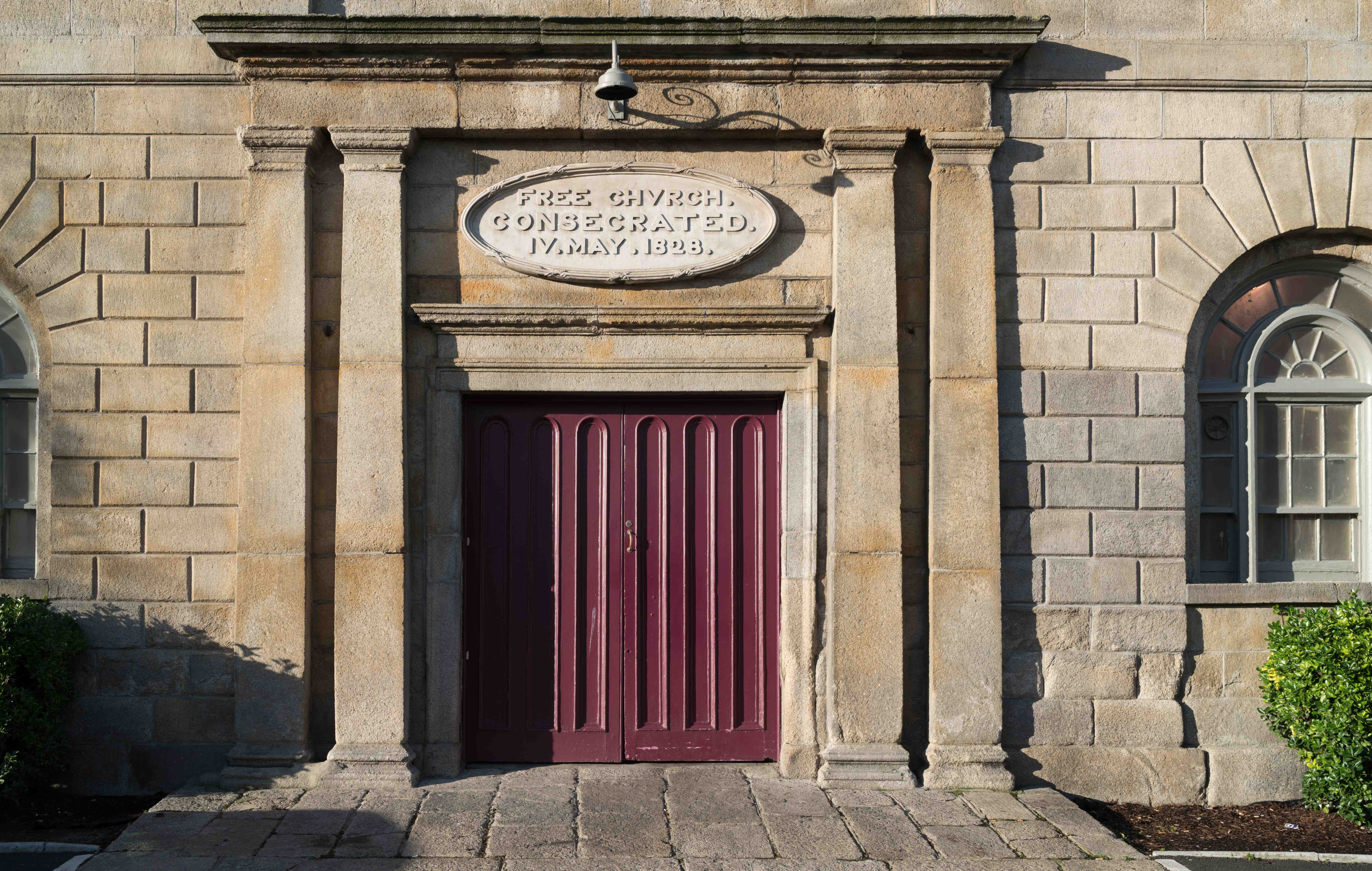
- Free Church, Charles Street Great, Dublin (formerly Wesley Chapel methodist church)
- Free Church, Great Charles Street, Dublin
- Country: Ireland
- Denomination: Methodist

Architecture
- Architect: Edward Robbins
- Style: Georgian
- Completed: 1800

Specifications
- Materials: granite front facade, calp limestone sides and rear

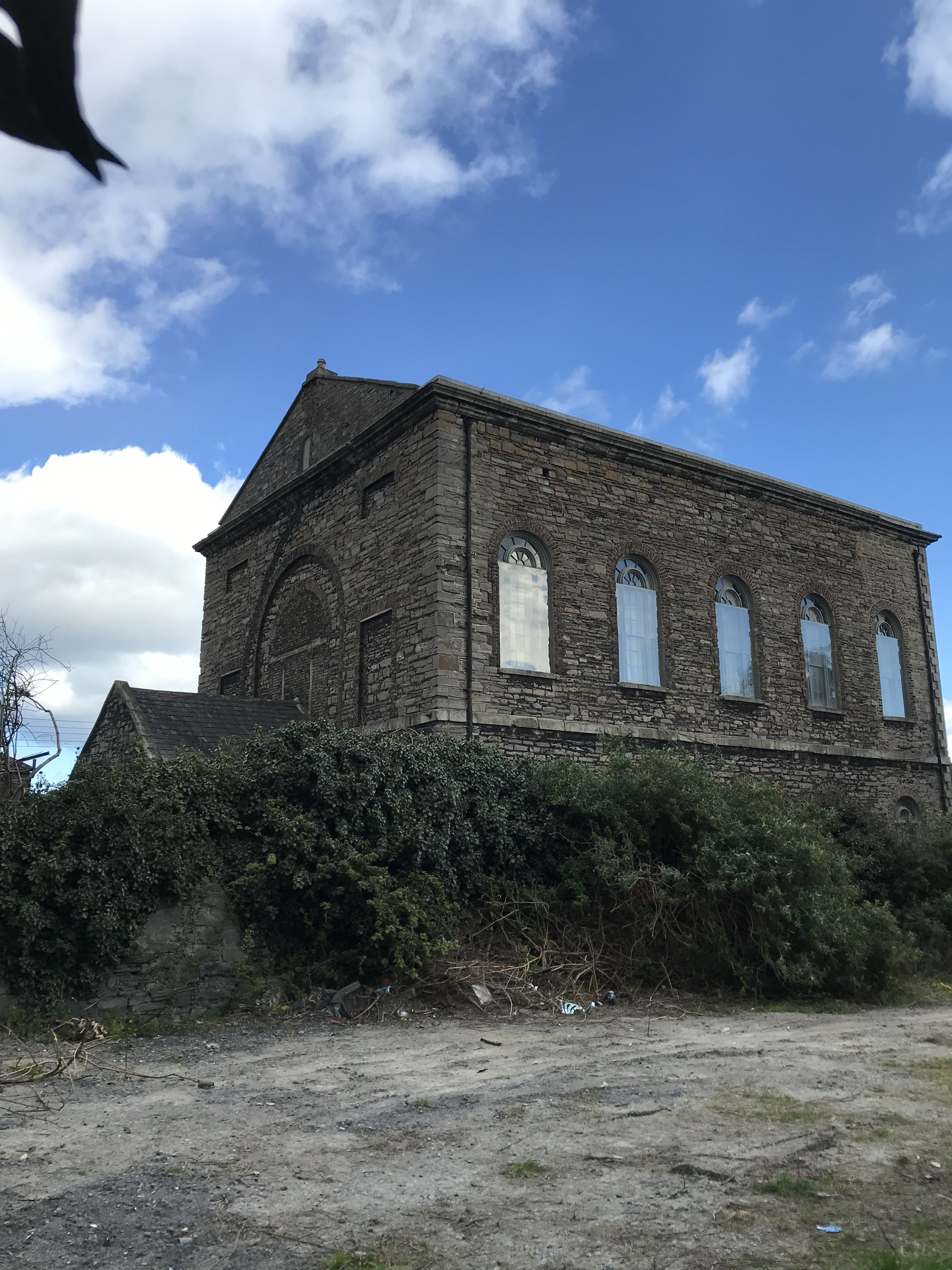
Side and back of Free Church

Free Church, Great Charles Street, Dublin was a proprietary episcopal chapel in Summerhill, off Mountjoy Square in Dublin.

Built by Methodists, in 1800, designed by architect Edward Robbins, and initially known as the Wesley Chapel. Following a schism in the congregation in 1816, a group called the Primitive Wesleyan Methodists split from the Methodist Church, it became known as the free church. Due to the free church being too large for their numbers, the Primitive Wesleyan Methodists opened a new Chapel nearby in Langrishe Place, Summerhill, in 1825.

The church originally framed a vista of 3 storey over basement Georgian houses facing down Rutland Street Upper (now Seán O'Casey Avenue) however these houses were demolished in the 1980s.

The Free Church was used by the Anglican congregation from the nearby St. George's Church, Dublin while it was being constructed.

It was reconsecrated a church within the Anglican Community on 4 May 1828 by Archbishop Magee. The landlord, the Methodist printer (who was treasurer of the Primitive Methodist Society Home Mission) R. Bennett Dugdale(1756-1826), wanted to prevent it becoming a Catholic church, and sold it in 1826, to the Church of Ireland. After this it was sometimes referred to as the Free Episcopal Chapel, Great Charles St.. Rev. John Hare was Chaplain, assisted by the organist the Rev. Richard William Beaty, from 1828 until 1877, he was succeeded by his pupil Richard Harrison. Rev. Oswald Garrow Fischer BA, who served as chaplain to the forces was attached to the Free Church for a time, as was Rev. Ernest Fischer who was Chaplain. C.R.R. Magrath who preached at and was Honorary Secretary of the Free Church (Dublin) wrote a short history of the church. It served as a chapel of ease for St. George's Church, Dublin during its popularity in the early 20th century.

It closed as a church in 1988. It was refurbished and adapted around 1990 becoming Pavee Point, for use as Dublin Travellers' Education and Development Group.
