= The Nun =

The Nun may refer to:

== Books ==
- The Nun, in French La Religieuse, an anti-Catholic novel by Denis Diderot, 1760
- The Nun, an anti-Catholic novel by Mary Martha Sherwood, 1833

== Film ==
- The Nun (1966 film), a 1966 drama film directed by Jacques Rivette, based on the Diderot novel
- The Nun (2005 film), a 2005 horror film directed by Luis De La Madrid
- The Nun (2013 film), a 2013 French film
- The Nun (2018 film), an American horror film and part of The Conjuring franchise
- The Nun II, an American 2023 horror film sequel to the 2018 movie

== Other ==
- The Nuns, a U.S. punk band
- "The Nun", a 1985 episode of the TV sitcom Night Court
- The Flying Nuns, early stage name for professional wrestling tag-team the Headbangers

== See also ==
- Nun (disambiguation)
