= Nones =

Nones may refer to:

- Nones (Auden), a 1951 book of poems by W. H. Auden
- Nones (Berio), a 1954 orchestral composition by Luciano Berio
- Nones (calendar), or Nonae, days of the Roman Calendar
- None (liturgy), the ninth hour of the traditional Christian liturgy
- Nones dialect, spoken in northern Italy
- Nones, a term sometimes used for people with no religious affiliation

== See also ==
- None (disambiguation)
