= Slightly Foxed =

British literary magazine

- Issue 58
- Editor: Hazel Wood and Gail Pirkis
- Categories: Literature, books
- Frequency: Quarterly
- Publisher: Slightly Foxed
- Paid circulation: 10,000
- Founded: 2004
- Country: United Kingdom
- Based in: Hoxton, London
- Language: English
- Website: www.foxedquarterly.com

Slightly Foxed is a British quarterly literary magazine. Its primary focus is books and book culture. It was established by former John Murray editors Hazel Wood and Gail Pirkis. Notable authors to have written for the magazine include Penelope Lively, Richard Mabey, Diana Athill, Ronald Blythe and Robert Macfarlane.

Instead of books currently marketed by big publishers, Slightly Foxed tends to examine older and more obscure titles. Its title comes from the term "slightly foxed" as a description of a book's physical quality, commonly used in the second-hand book trade to describe minor foxing, the occurrence of brown spots on older paper.

As well as the magazine itself, Slightly Foxed has a books imprint. Original books published by the imprint include Philip Evans' Country Doctor's Common Place Book and Charles Phillipson’s Letters to Michael (selected by the Telegraph as one of the best books of 2021). The imprint has also reissued a number of classic works and children's books, including Rosemary Sutcliff's novels about Roman Britain and the Carey novels of Ronald Welch.

Since 2014, the magazine has sponsored the Slightly Foxed Best First Biography Prize for the best first biography or literary memoir published each year. In 2023, the prize was won jointly by Katherine Rundell for her biography of John Donne, Super-Infinite, and Osman Yousefzada for his memoir The Go-Between. Winners from previous years include Edmund Gordon for The Invention of Angela Carter and Alan Cumming for Not My Father’s Son.

In addition to the quarterly magazine, Slightly Foxed produces a podcast about books, book culture and writers.

Between 2009 and 2016, Slightly Foxed ran a bookshop of the same name on London's Gloucester Road.

The magazine's offices are based at Hoxton Square, London, N1.

For the 20th anniversary and the 80th issue of the publication, the cover of Slightly Foxed featured an original linocut by James Nunn of two foxes in the shape of the number 20. Nunn's art was also featured on the back cover of issues 77, 78, and 79. The issue was published on 1 December 2023.

In 2023, Pirkis received an MBE in the King's Birthday Honours, for services to Literature, in recognition of her work as editor of the magazine.
