= Aristophanes =

Classical Athenian comic playwright (c. 446 – c. 386 BC)

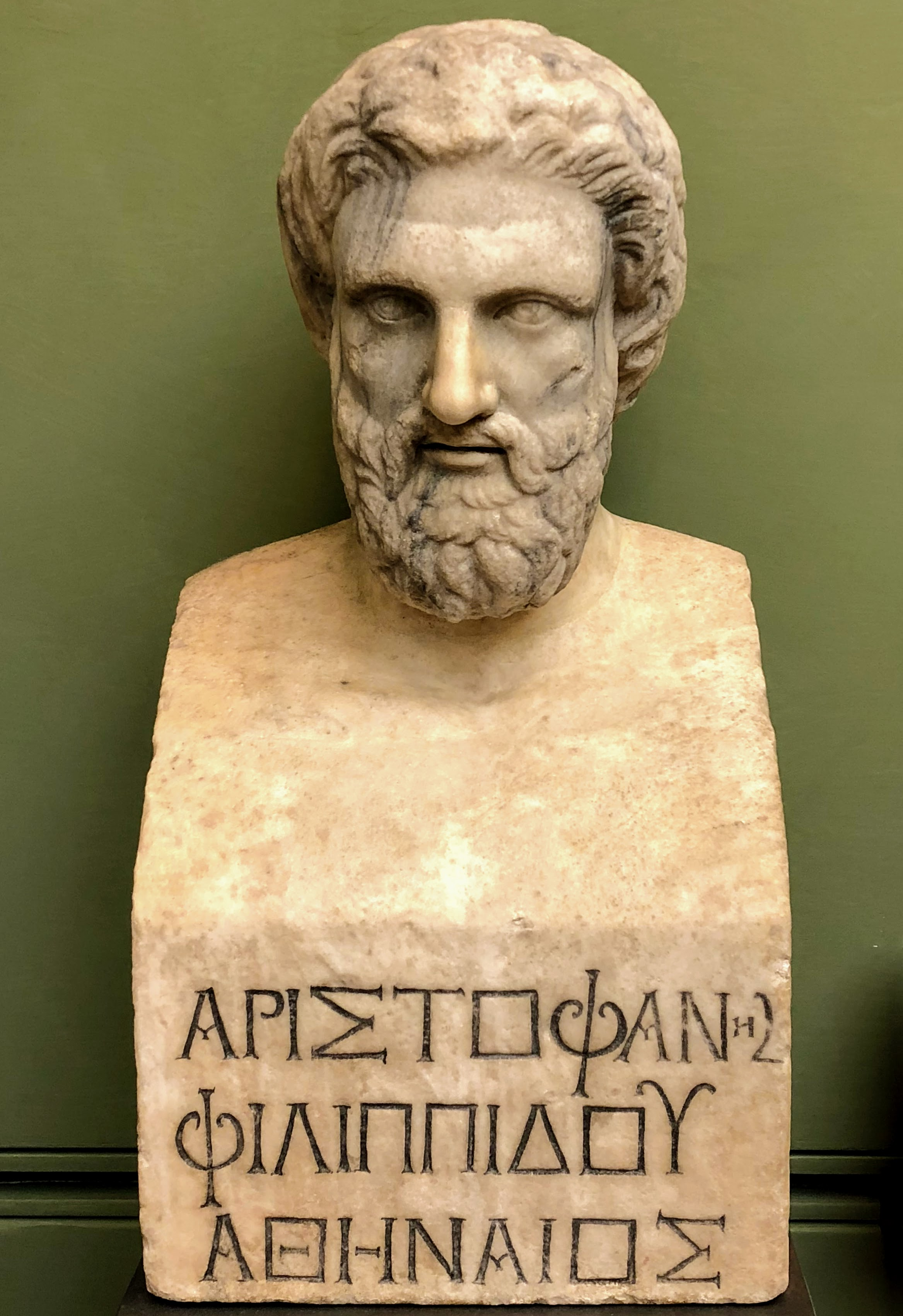
- Bust with the inscription "Aristophanes, (son) of Philippides, the Athenian", (Note: Some Roman-era inscriptions erroneously make Aristophanes the son of "Philippides", a name which by itself means "son of Philippos".) 1st century AD (Note: Although many artists' renderings of Aristophanes portray him with flowing curly hair, several jests in his plays indicate that he may have been prematurely bald.)
- Born: c. 446 BC; Athens, Greece
- Died: c. 386 BC (aged c. 60)
- Occupation: Playwright (comedy)
- Years active: 427 BC – 386 BC
- Known for: Playwright and only surviving example of Old Comedy
- Notable work: The Knights (424 BC); The Clouds (423 BC); The Wasps (422 BC); The Birds (414 BC); Lysistrata (411 BC); Women at the Thesmophoria (411 BC); The Frogs (405 BC); Assemblywomen (392 BC)

Aristophanes (/ˌærɪˈstɒfəniːz/; Ancient Greek: Ἀριστοφάνης [aristopʰánɛːs]; c. 446 – c. 386 BC) was an Ancient Greek comic playwright from Athens. He wrote forty plays, of which eleven survive virtually complete. The majority of his surviving plays belong to the genre of comic drama known as Old Comedy and are considered its most valuable examples. (Note: The first nine of Aristophanes's extant plays belong to Old Comedy, while his last two are seen as examples of Middle Comedy (see Thorburn 2005, p. 67), marking the shift towards what would become known as New Comedy (see Roman & Roman 2010, p. 83)) Aristophanes's plays were performed at the religious festivals of Athens, mostly the City Dionysia and the Lenaia, and several of them won the first prize in their respective competitions.

Also known as "The Father of Comedy" and "the Prince of Ancient Comedy", Aristophanes wrote plays that often dealt with real-life figures, including Euripides and Alcibiades, and contemporary events, such as the Peloponnesian War. He has been said to recreate the life of ancient Athens more convincingly than any other author. His plays are characterized by preposterous premises, explicit language, wordplays, and political satire. His powers of ridicule were feared and acknowledged by influential contemporaries; Plato singled out Aristophanes's play The Clouds as slander that contributed to the trial and subsequent condemning to death of Socrates, although other satirical playwrights had also caricatured the philosopher.

Aristophanes's second play, The Babylonians (now lost), was denounced by Cleon as a slander against the Athenian polis. It is possible that the case was argued in court, but details of the trial are not recorded and Aristophanes caricatured Cleon mercilessly in his subsequent plays, especially The Knights, the first of many plays that he directed himself. "In my opinion," he says through that play's Chorus, "the author-director of comedies has the hardest job of all."

== Biography ==
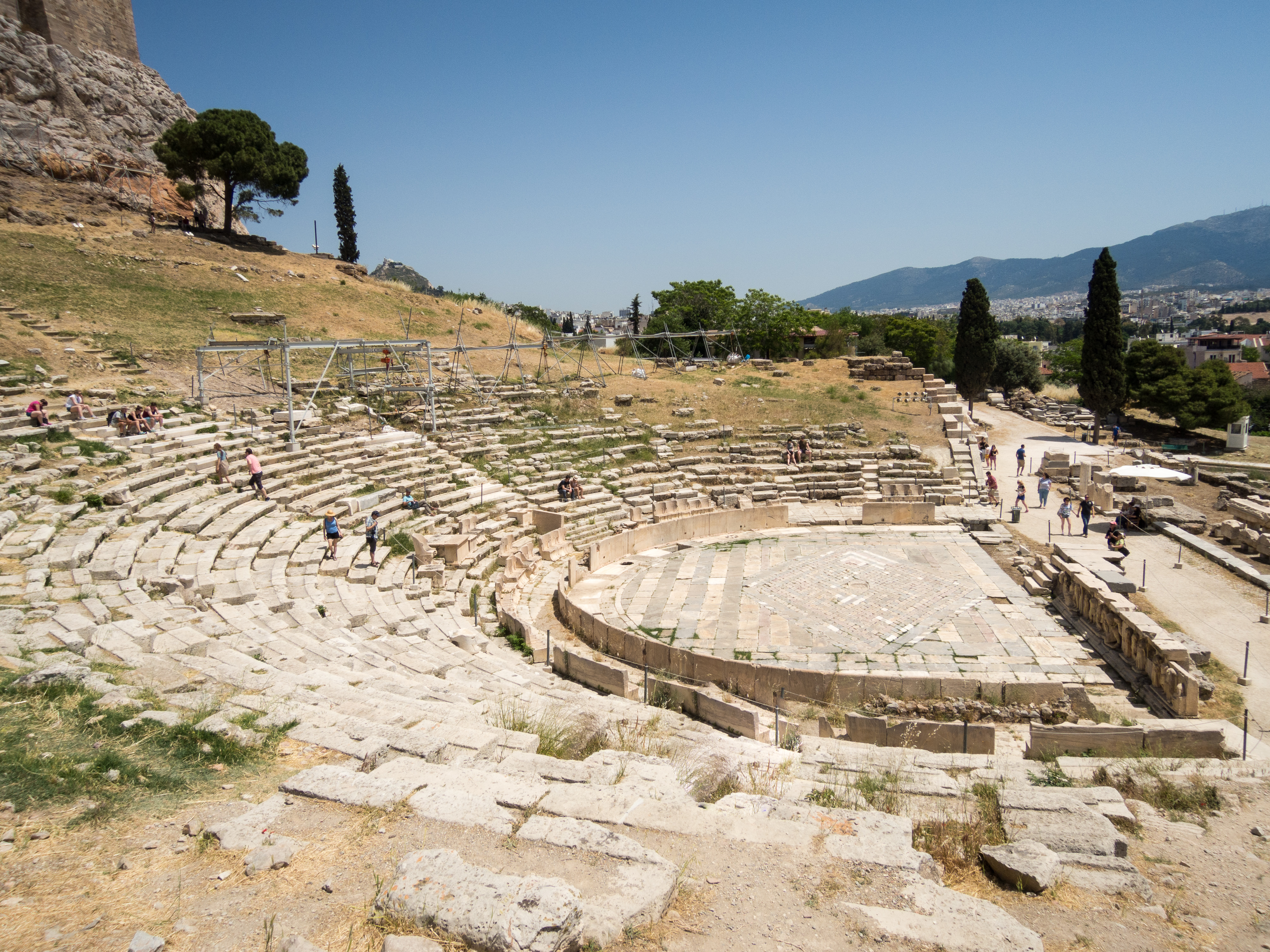
Theatre of Dionysus, Athens – in Aristophanes's time, the audience probably sat on wooden benches with earth foundations.

An Athenian citizen, Aristophanes came from the deme of Kydathenaion, which was part of the Attic tribe (phyle) of Pandionis. His father was Philippus and his mother was Zenodora. In antiquity, his family was assumed to have connections with the island of Aegina, and is suspected to not only be very wealthy, but very educated as well. Little is known about Aristophanes's life, his plays being the main source of biographical information. It was conventional in Old Comedy for the chorus to speak on behalf of the author during an address called the parabasis, where some biographical facts can usually be found. These facts, however, relate almost entirely to his career as a dramatist and the plays contain few clear and unambiguous clues about his personal beliefs or his private life. He was a comic poet in an age when it was conventional for the playwright to also serve as the play's director (didaskalos). The term literally means "teacher," referring primarily to his role in training the chorus in rehearsal, but perhaps also covered his relationship with the audience as a commentator on significant issues.

Aristophanes claimed to be writing for a clever and discerning audience, yet he also declared that "other times" would judge the audience according to its reception of his plays. He sometimes boasts of his originality as a dramatist yet his plays consistently espouse opposition to radical new influences in Athenian society. He caricatured leading figures in the arts (notably Euripides, whose influence on his own work however he once grudgingly acknowledged), in politics (especially the populist Cleon), and in philosophy/religion (where Socrates was the most obvious target). Such caricatures seem to imply that Aristophanes was an old-fashioned conservative, yet that view of him leads to contradictions.

It has been argued that Aristophanes produced plays mainly to entertain the audience and to win prestigious competitions. His plays were written for production at the great dramatic festivals of Athens, the Lenaia and City Dionysia, where they were judged and awarded prizes in competition with the works of other comic dramatists. An elaborate series of lotteries, designed to prevent prejudice and corruption, reduced the voting judges at the City Dionysia to just five. These judges probably reflected the mood of the audiences yet there is much uncertainty about the composition of those audiences. The theatres were certainly huge, with seating for at least 10,000 at the Theatre of Dionysus. The day's program at the City Dionysia for example was crowded, with three tragedies and a satyr play ahead of a comedy, but it is possible that many of the poorer citizens (typically the main supporters of demagogues like Cleon) occupied the festival holiday with other pursuits. The conservative views expressed in the plays might therefore reflect the attitudes of the dominant group in an unrepresentative audience.

The production process might also have influenced the views expressed in the plays. Throughout most of Aristophanes's career, the Chorus was essential to a play's success and it was recruited and funded by a choregus, a wealthy citizen appointed to the task by one of the archons. A choregus could regard his personal expenditure on the Chorus as a civic duty and a public honour, but Aristophanes showed in The Knights that wealthy citizens might regard civic responsibilities as punishment imposed on them by demagogues and populists like Cleon. Thus the political conservatism of the plays may reflect the views of the wealthiest section of Athenian society, on whose generosity all dramatists depended for putting on their plays.

When Aristophanes's first play The Banqueters was produced, Athens was an ambitious, imperial power and the Peloponnesian War was only in its fourth year. His plays often express pride in the achievement of the older generation (the victors at Marathon) yet they are not jingoistic, and they are staunchly opposed to the war with Sparta. The plays are particularly scathing in criticism of war profiteers, among whom populists such as Cleon figure prominently. By the time his last play was produced (around 386 BC) Athens had been defeated in war, its empire had been dismantled and it had undergone a transformation from being the political to the intellectual centre of Greece. Aristophanes was part of this transformation and he shared in the intellectual fashions of the period—the structure of his plays evolves from Old Comedy until, in his last surviving play, Wealth II, it more closely resembles New Comedy. However it is uncertain whether he led or merely responded to changes in audience expectations.

Aristophanes won second prize at the City Dionysia in 427 BC with his first play The Banqueters (now lost). He won first prize there with his next play, The Babylonians (also now lost). It was usual for foreign dignitaries to attend the City Dionysia, and The Babylonians caused some embarrassment for the Athenian authorities since it depicted the cities of the Delian League as slaves grinding at a mill. Some influential citizens, notably Cleon, reviled the play as slander against the polis and possibly took legal action against the author. The details of the trial are unrecorded but, speaking through the hero of his third play The Acharnians (staged at the Lenaia, where there were few or no foreign dignitaries), the poet carefully distinguishes between the polis and the real targets of his acerbic wit:

ἡμῶν γὰρ ἄνδρες, κοὐχὶ τὴν πόλιν λέγω,
μέμνησθε τοῦθ᾽ ὅτι οὐχὶ τὴν πόλιν λέγω,
ἀλλ᾽ ἀνδράρια μοχθηρά, παρακεκομμένα...

Translation:

People among us, and I don't mean the polis,
Remember this – I don't mean the polis –
But wicked little men of a counterfeit kind....

Aristophanes repeatedly savages Cleon in his later plays. But these satirical diatribes appear to have had no effect on Cleon's political career—a few weeks after the performance of The Knights—a play full of anti-Cleon jokes—Cleon was elected to the prestigious board of ten generals. Cleon also seems to have had no real power to limit or control Aristophanes: the caricatures of him continued up to and even beyond his death.

In the absence of clear biographical facts about Aristophanes, scholars make educated guesses based on interpretation of the language in the plays. Inscriptions and summaries or comments by Hellenistic and Byzantine scholars can also provide useful clues. We know from a combination of these sources, and especially from comments in The Knights and The Clouds, that Aristophanes's first three plays were not directed by him; they were instead directed by Callistratus and Philoneides, an arrangement that seemed to suit Aristophanes since he appears to have used these same directors in many later plays as well (Philoneides for example later directed The Frogs and he was also credited, perhaps wrongly, with directing The Wasps). Aristophanes's use of directors complicates our reliance on the plays as sources of biographical information, because apparent self-references might have been made with reference to his directors instead. Thus, for example, a statement by the chorus in The Acharnians seems to indicate that the "poet" had a close, personal association with the island of Aegina. Similarly, the hero in The Acharnians complains about Cleon "dragging me into court" over "last year's play."

Comments made by the Chorus referring to Aristophanes in The Clouds have been interpreted as evidence that he can hardly have been more than 18 years old when his first play The Banqueters was produced. The second parabasis in Wasps appears to indicate that he reached some kind of temporary accommodation with Cleon following either the controversy over The Babylonians or a subsequent controversy over The Knights. It has been inferred from statements in The Clouds and Peace that Aristophanes was prematurely bald.

Aristophanes was probably victorious at least once at the City Dionysia, with Babylonians in 427, and at least three times at the Lenaia, with The Acharnians in 425, Knights in 424, and Frogs in 405. Frogs in fact won the unique distinction of a repeat performance at a subsequent festival. A son of Aristophanes, Araros, was also a comic poet and he could have been heavily involved in the production of his father's play Wealth II in 388. Araros is also thought to have been responsible for the posthumous performances of the now lost plays Aeolosicon II and Cocalus, and it is possible that the last of these won the prize at the City Dionysia in 387. It appears that a second son, Philippus, was twice victorious at the Lenaia and he could have directed some of Eubulus's comedies. A third son was called either Nicostratus or Philetaerus, and a man by the latter name appears in the catalogue of Lenaia victors with two victories, the first probably in the late 370s.

Aristophanes survived The Peloponnesian War, two oligarchic revolutions and two democratic restorations; this has been interpreted as evidence that he was not actively involved in politics, despite his highly political plays. He was probably appointed to the Council of Five Hundred for a year at the beginning of the fourth century, but such appointments were very common in democratic Athens.

=== Plato's Symposium ===
Plato's The Symposium appears to be a useful source of biographical information about Aristophanes, but its reliability is open to doubt. It purports to be a record of conversations at a dinner party at which both Aristophanes and Socrates are guests, held some seven years after the performance of The Clouds, the play in which Socrates was cruelly caricatured. One of the guests, Alcibiades, even quotes from the play when teasing Socrates over his appearance and yet there is no indication of any ill-feeling between Socrates and Aristophanes. Plato's Aristophanes is in fact a genial character and this has been interpreted as evidence of Plato's own friendship with him (their friendship appears to be corroborated by an epitaph for Aristophanes, reputedly written by Plato, in which the playwright's soul is compared to an eternal shrine for the Graces). Plato was only a boy when the events in The Symposium are supposed to have occurred and it is possible that his Aristophanes is in fact based on a reading of the plays. For example, conversation among the guests turns to the subject of Love and Aristophanes explains his notion of it in terms of an amusing allegory, a device he often uses in his plays. He is represented as suffering an attack of hiccups and this might be a humorous reference to the crude physical jokes in his plays. He tells the other guests that he is quite happy to be thought amusing but he is wary of appearing ridiculous. This fear of being ridiculed is consistent with his declaration in The Knights that he embarked on the career of comic playwright warily after witnessing the public contempt and ridicule that other dramatists had incurred.

== Use of language ==
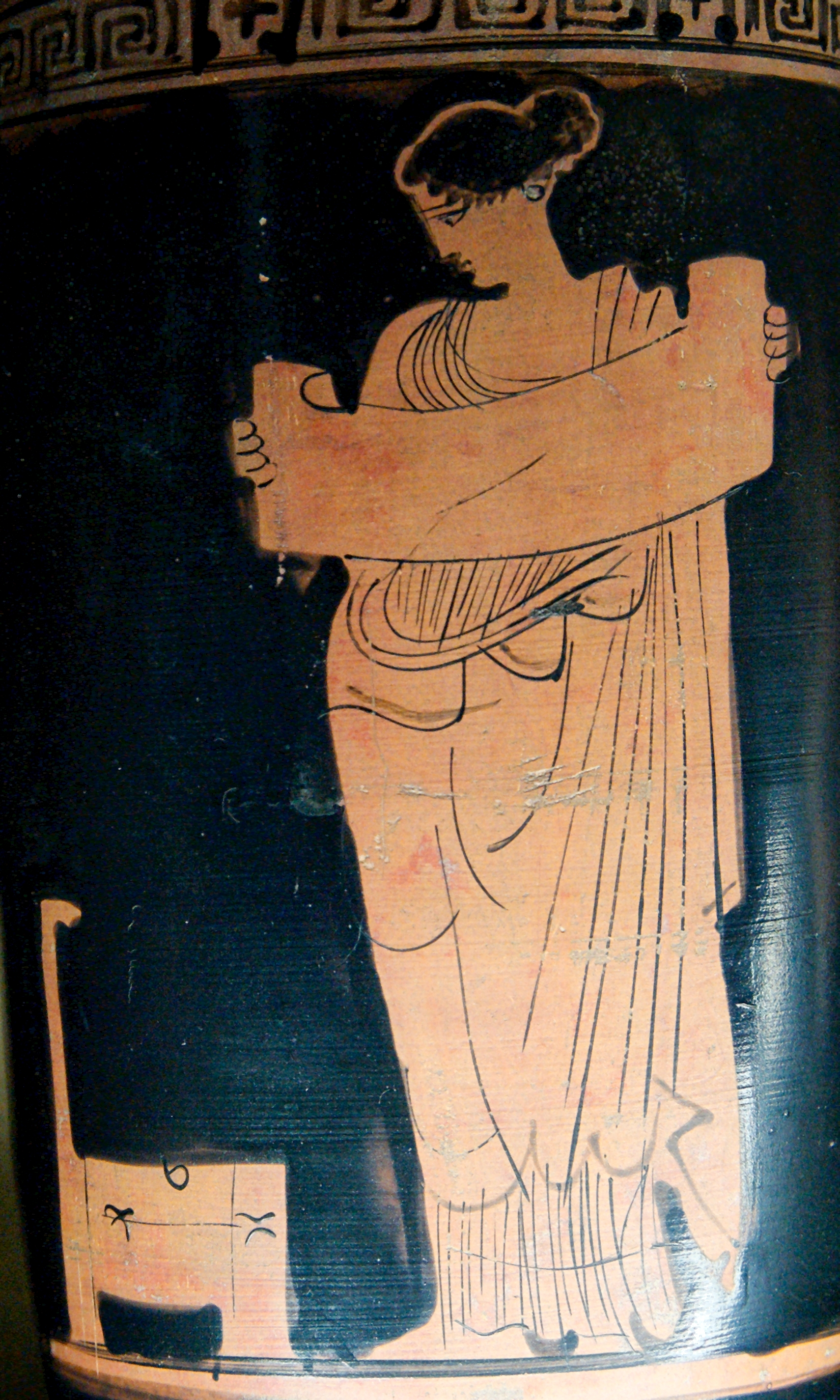
Muse reading, Louvre

The language of Aristophanes's plays, and in Old Comedy generally, was valued by ancient commentators as a model of the Attic dialect. The orator Quintilian believed that the charm and grandeur of the Attic dialect made Old Comedy an example for orators to study and follow, and he considered it inferior in these respects only to the works of Homer. A revival of interest in the Attic dialect may have been responsible for the recovery and circulation of Aristophanes's plays during the fourth and fifth centuries AD, resulting in their survival today. In Aristophanes's plays, the Attic dialect is couched in verse and his plays can be appreciated for their poetic qualities.

For Aristophanes's contemporaries the works of Homer and Hesiod formed the cornerstones of Hellenic history and culture. Thus poetry had a moral and social significance that made it an inevitable topic of comic satire. Aristophanes was very conscious of literary fashions and traditions and his plays feature numerous references to other poets. These include not only rival comic dramatists such as Eupolis and Hermippus and predecessors such as Magnes, Crates and Cratinus, but also tragedians, notably Aeschylus, Sophocles and Euripides, all three of whom are mentioned in e.g. The Frogs. Aristophanes was the equal of these great tragedians in his subtle use of lyrics. He appears to have modelled his approach to language on that of Euripides in particular, so much so that the comic dramatist Cratinus labelled him a 'Euripidaristophanist' addicted to hair-splitting niceties.

A full appreciation of Aristophanes's plays requires an understanding of the poetic forms he employed with virtuoso skill, and of their different rhythms and associations. There were three broad poetic forms: iambic dialogue, tetrameter verses and lyrics:

- Iambic dialogue: Aristophanes achieves an effect resembling natural speech through the use of the iambic trimeter (corresponding to the effects achieved by English poets such as Shakespeare using iambic pentameters). His realistic use of the meter makes it ideal for both dialogue and soliloquy, as for instance in the prologue, before the arrival of the Chorus, when the audience is introduced to the main issues in the plot. The Acharnians opens with these three lines by the hero, Dikaiopolis (rendered here in English as iambic pentameters):
  How many are the things that vex my heart!
  Pleasures are few, so very few – just four –
  But stressful things are manysandthousandsandheaps!
  Here Aristophanes employs a frequent device, arranging the syntax so that the final word in a line comes as a comic climax. The hero's pleasures are so few he can number them (τέτταρα, four) but his causes for complaint are so many they beggar numerical description and he must invent his own word for them (ψαμμακοσιογάργαρα, literally "sandhundredheaps", here paraphrased "manysandthousandsandheaps"). The use of invented compound words is another comic device frequently found in the plays.
- Tetrameter catalectic verses: These are long lines of anapests, trochees or iambs (where each line is ideally measured in four dipodes or pairs of feet), used in various situations within each play such as:
  - formal debates or agons between characters (typically in anapestic rhythm);
  - excited dialogue or heated argument (typically trochaic rhythm, the same as in early tragedy);
  - long speeches declaimed by the Chorus in parabases (in either anapestic or trochaic rhythms);
  - informal debates barely above the level of ordinary dialogue (typically iambic).
  Anapestic rhythms are naturally jaunty (as in many limericks) and trochaic meter is suited to rapid delivery (the word "trochee" is in fact derived from trechein, "to run", as demonstrated for example by choruses who enter at speed, often in aggressive mood) However, even though both these rhythms can seem to "bowl along" Aristophanes often varies them through use of complex syntax and substituted meters, adapting the rhythms to the requirements of serious argument. In an anapestic passage in The Frogs, for instance, the character Aeschylus presents a view of poetry that is supposed to be serious but which leads to a comic interruption by the god, Dionysus:
  AES.:It was Orpheus singing who taught us religion and how wrong people are when they kill,
  And we learned from Musaeus medicinal cures and the science of divination.
  If it's farming you want, Hesiod knows it all, when to plant, when to harvest. How godlike
  Homer got to be famous, I'll tell if you ask: he taught us what all good men should know,
  Discipline, fortitude, battle-readiness. DIO.: But no-one taught Pantocles – yesterday
  He was marching his men up and down on parade when the crest of his helmet fell off!
  The rhythm begins at a typical anapestic gallop, slows down to consider the revered poets Hesiod and Homer, then gallops off again to its comic conclusion at the expense of the unfortunate Pantocles. Such subtle variations in rhythm are common in the plays, allowing for serious points to be made while still whetting the audience's appetite for the next joke.
- Lyrics: Almost nothing is known about the music that accompanied Greek lyrics, and the meter is often so varied and complex that it is difficult for modern readers or audiences to get a feel for the intended effects, yet Aristophanes still impresses with the charm and simplicity of his lyrics. Some of the most memorable and haunting lyrics are dignified hymns set free of the comic action. In the example below, taken from The Wasps, the lyric is merely a comic interlude and the rhythm is steadily trochaic. The syntax in the original Greek is natural and unforced and it was probably accompanied by brisk and cheerful music, gliding to a concluding pun at the expense of Amynias, who is thought to have lost his fortune gambling.
  Though to myself I often seem
  A bright chap and not awkward,
  None comes close to Amynias,
  Son of Sellos of the Bigwig
  Clan, a man I once saw
  Dine with rich Leogorus.
  Now as poor as Antiphon,
  He lives on apples and pomegranates
  Yet he got himself appointed
  Ambassador to Pharsalus,
  Way up there in Thessaly,
  Home of the poor Penestes:
  Happy to be where everyone
  Is as penniless as he is!
  The pun here in English translation (Penestes–penniless) is a weak version of the Greek pun Πενέσταισι-πενέστης, Penéstaisi-penéstĕs, "destitute". Many of the puns in the plays are based on words that are similar rather than identical, and it has been observed that there could be more of them than scholars have yet been able to identify. Others are based on double meanings. Sometimes entire scenes are constructed on puns, as in The Acharnians with the Megarian farmer and his pigs: the Megarian farmer defies the Athenian embargo against Megarian trade, and tries to trade his daughters disguised as pigs, except "pig" was ancient slang for "vagina". Since the embargo against Megara was the pretext for the Peloponnesian War, Aristophanes naturally concludes that this whole mess happened because of "three cunts".

It can be argued that the most important feature of the language of the plays is imagery, particularly the use of similes, metaphors and pictorial expressions. In The Knights, for example, the ears of a character with selective hearing are represented as parasols that open and close. In The Frogs, Aeschylus is said to compose verses in the manner of a horse rolling in a sandpit. Some plays feature revelations of human perfectibility that are poetic rather than religious in character, such as the marriage of the hero Pisthetairos to Zeus's paramour in The Birds and the "recreation" of old Athens, crowned with roses, at the end of The Knights.

== Aristophanes and Old Comedy ==
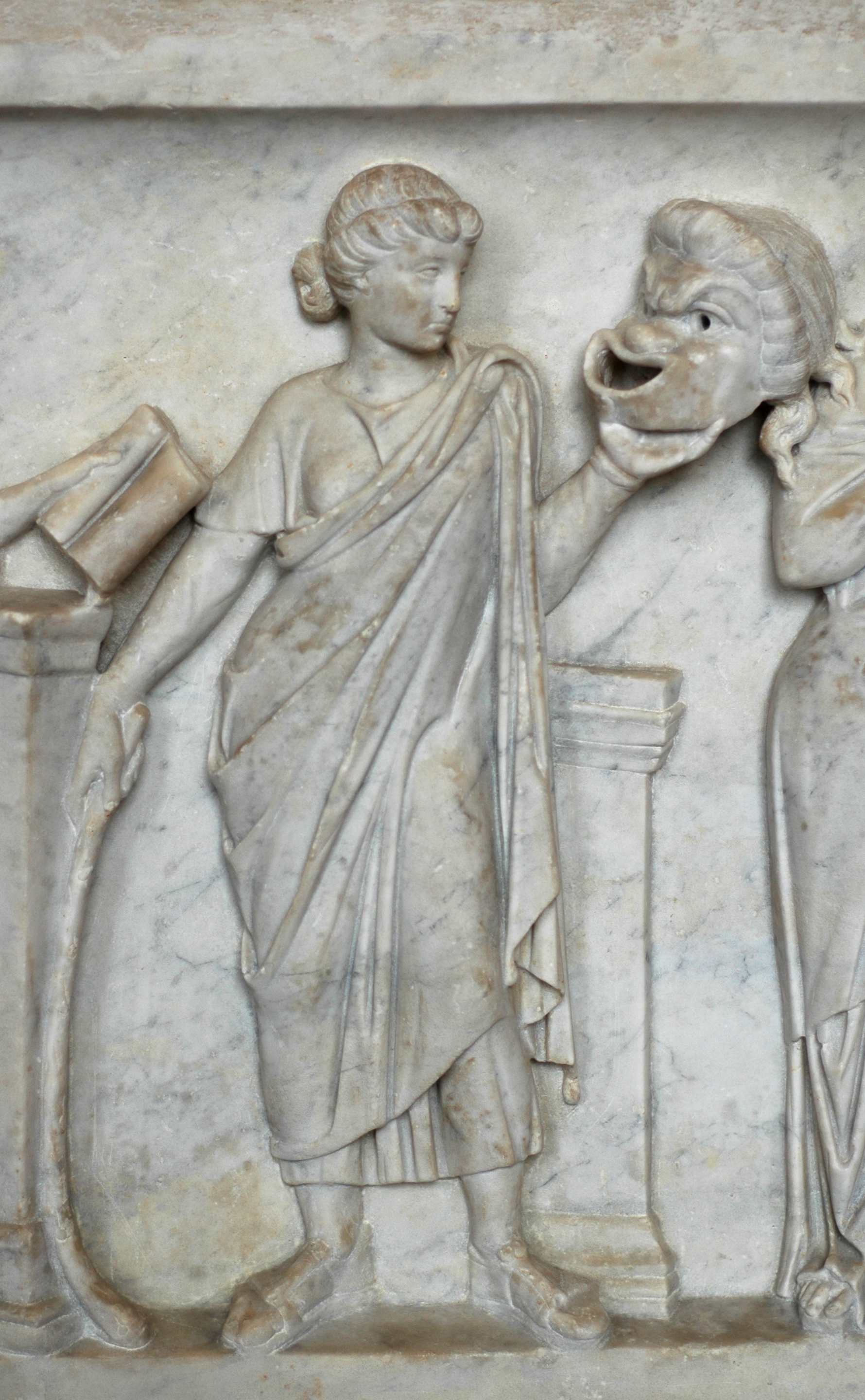
Thalia, muse of comedy, gazing upon a comic mask (detail from Muses' Sarcophagus)

The plays of Aristophanes are the only full-length examples of the genre of Old Comedy to have survived from antiquity. This makes them centrally important to modern understandings of the genre. The themes of Old Comedy included:

- Inclusive comedy: Old Comedy provided a variety of entertainments for a diverse audience. It accommodated a serious purpose, light entertainment, hauntingly beautiful lyrics, the buffoonery of puns and invented words, obscenities, disciplined verse, wildly absurd plots and a formal, dramatic structure.
- Fantasy and absurdity: Fantasy in Old Comedy is unrestricted and impossibilities are ignored. Situations are developed logically to absurd conclusions, an approach to humour that is echoed for instance in the works of Lewis Carroll and Eugène Ionesco (the Theatre of the Absurd). The crazy costume worn by Dionysus in The Frogs is typical of an absurd result obtained on logical grounds—he wears a woman's saffron-coloured tunic because effeminacy is an aspect of his divinity, buskin boots because he is interested in reviving the art of tragedy, and a lion skin cape because, like Heracles, his mission leads him into Hades. Absurdities develop logically from initial premises in a plot. In The Knights for instance, Cleon's corrupt service to the people of Athens is originally depicted as a household relationship in which the slave dupes his master. The introduction of a rival, who is not a member of the household, leads to an absurd shift in the metaphor, so that Cleon and his rival become erastai competing for the affections of an eromenos, hawkers of oracles competing for the attention of a credulous public, athletes in a race for approval and orators competing for the popular vote.
- The resourceful hero: In Aristophanic comedy, the hero is an independent-minded and self-reliant individual. He has something of the ingenuity of Homer's Odysseus and much of the shrewdness of the farmer idealized in Hesiod's Works and Days, subjected to corrupt leaders and unreliable neighbours. Typically he devises a complicated and highly fanciful escape from an intolerable situation. Thus Dikaiopolis in The Acharnians contrives a private peace treaty with the Spartans; Bdelucleon in The Wasps turns his own house into a private law court in order to keep his jury-addicted father safely at home; Trygaeus in Peace flies to Olympus on a giant dung beetle to obtain an end to the Peloponnesian War; Pisthetairus in Birds sets off to establish his own colony and becomes instead the ruler of the bird kingdom and a rival to the gods.
- The resourceful cast: The numerous surprising developments in an Aristophanic plot, the changes in scene, and the farcical comings and goings of minor characters towards the end of a play, were managed according to theatrical convention with only three principal actors (a fourth actor, often the leader of the chorus, was permitted to deliver short speeches). Songs and addresses to the audience by the Chorus gave the actors hardly enough time off-stage to draw breath and to prepare for changes in scene.
- Complex structure: The action of an Aristophanic play obeyed a crazy logic of its own and yet it always unfolded within a formal, dramatic structure that was repeated with minor variations from one play to another. The different, structural elements are associated with different poetic meters, which are generally lost in English translations.

=== Dramatic structure of Aristophanes's plots ===
The structural elements of a typical Aristophanic plot can be summarized as follows:

prologue
an introductory scene with a dialogue and/or soliloquy addressed to the audience, expressed in iambic trimeter and explaining the situation that is to be resolved in the play
parodos
the arrival of the chorus, dancing and singing, sometimes followed by a choreographed skirmish with one or more actors, often expressed in long lines of tetrameters
symmetrical scenes
passages featuring songs and declaimed verses in long lines of tetrameters, arranged symmetrically in two sections such that each half resembles the other in meter and line length; the agon and parabasis can be considered specific instances of symmetrical scenes:

parabasis
verses through which the Chorus addresses the audience directly, firstly in the middle of the play and again near the end (see the section below, Parabasis)
agon
a formal debate that decides the outcome of the play, typically in anapestic tetrameter, though iambs are sometimes used to delineate inferior arguments;

episodes
sections of dialogue in iambic trimeter, often in a succession of scenes featuring minor characters towards the end of a play
songs ('strophes'/'antistrophes' or 'odes'/'antodes')
often in symmetrical pairs where each half has the same meter and number of lines as the other, used as transitions between other structural elements, or between scenes while actors change costume, and often commenting on the action
exodus
the departure of the Chorus and the actors, in song and dance celebrating the hero's victory and sometimes celebrating a symbolic marriage.

The rules of competition did not prevent a playwright arranging and adjusting these elements to suit his particular needs. In The Acharnians and Peace, for example, there is no formal agon whereas in The Clouds there are two agons.

==== Parabasis ====
The parabasis is an address to the audience by the chorus or chorus leader while the actors leave or have left the stage. In this role, the chorus is sometimes out of character, as the author's voice, and sometimes in character, although these capacities are often difficult to distinguish. Generally the parabasis occurs somewhere in the middle of a play and often there is a second parabasis towards the end. The elements of a parabasis have been defined and named by scholars but it is probable that Aristophanes's own understanding was less formal. The selection of elements can vary from play to play and it varies considerably within plays between first and second parabasis. The early plays (The Acharnians to The Birds) are fairly uniform in their approach however and the following elements of a parabasis can be found within them.

kommation
This is a brief prelude, comprising short lines and often including a valediction to the departing actors, such as ἴτε χαίροντες (Go rejoicing!).
parabasis proper
This is usually a defense of the author's work and it includes criticism of the audience's attitude. It is declaimed in long lines of 'anapestic tetrameters'. Aristophanes himself refers to the parabasis proper only as 'anapests'.
pnigos
Sometimes known as 'a choker', it comprises a few short lines appended to the parabasis proper as a kind of rapid patter (it has been suggested that some of the effects achieved in a pnigos can be heard in "The Lord Chancellor's Nightmare Song", in act 2 of Gilbert and Sullivan's Iolanthe).
epirrhematic syzygies
These are symmetrical scenes that mirror each other in meter and number of lines. They form part of the first parabasis and they often comprise the entire second parabasis. They are characterized by the following elements:

strophe or ode
These are lyrics in a variety of meters, sung by the Chorus in the first parabasis as an invocation to the gods and as a comic interlude in the second parabasis.
epirrhema
These are usually long lines of trochaic tetrameters. Broadly political in their significance, they were probably spoken by the leader of the Chorus in character.
antistrophe or antode
These are songs that mirror the strophe/ode in meter, length and function.
antepirrhema
This is another declaimed passage and it mirrors the epirrhema in meter, length and function.

The Wasps is thought to offer the best example of a conventional approach and the elements of a parabasis can be identified and located in that play as follows.

Elements in The Wasps	1st parabasis	2nd parabasis
kommation	lines 1009–1014	---
parabasis proper	lines 1015–1050	---
pnigos	lines 1051–1059	---
strophe	lines 1060–1070	lines 1265–1274
epirrhema	lines 1071–1090	lines 1275–1283
antistrophe	lines 1091–1101	missing
antepirrhema	lines 1102–1121	lines 1284–1291

Textual corruption is probably the reason for the absence of the antistrophe in the second parabasis. However, there are several variations from the ideal even within the early plays. For example, the parabasis proper in The Clouds (lines 518–562) is composed in eupolidean meter rather than in anapests and the second parabasis includes a kommation but it lacks strophe, antistrophe and antepirrhema (The Clouds lines 1113–1130). The second parabasis in The Acharnians lines 971–999 can be considered a hybrid parabasis/song (i.e. the declaimed sections are merely continuations of the strophe and antistrophe) and, unlike the typical parabasis, it seems to comment on actions that occur on stage during the address. An understanding of Old Comedy conventions such as the parabasis is necessary for a proper understanding of Aristophanes's plays; on the other hand, a sensitive appreciation of the plays is necessary for a proper understanding of the conventions.

== Influence and legacy ==
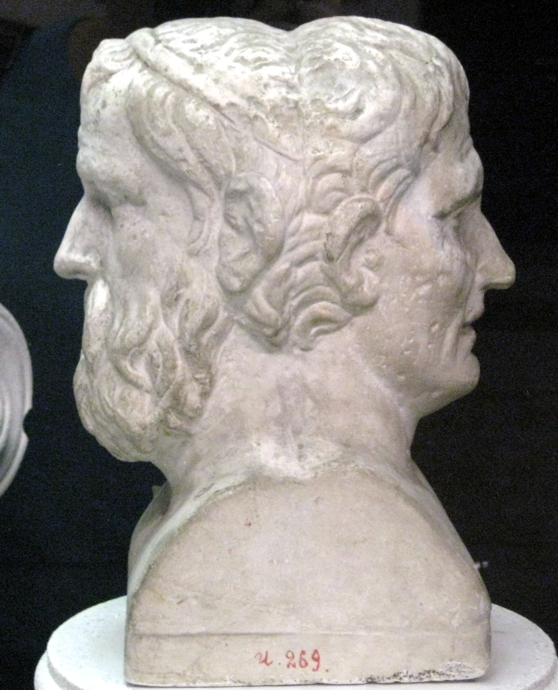
Aristophanes, the master of Old Comedy, and Menander, the master of New Comedy.

The tragic dramatists Sophocles and Euripides died near the end of the Peloponnesian War, and the art of tragedy thereafter ceased to develop, yet comedy continued to evolve after the defeat of Athens, and it is possible that it did so because, in Aristophanes, it had a master craftsman who lived long enough to help usher it into a new age. Indeed, according to one ancient source (Platonius, c. 9th century AD), one of Aristophanes's last plays, Aioliskon, had neither a parabasis nor any choral lyrics (making it a type of Middle Comedy), while Kolakos anticipated all the elements of New Comedy, including a rape and a recognition scene. Aristophanes seems to have had some appreciation of his formative role in the development of comedy, as indicated by his comment in Clouds that his audience would be judged by other times according to its reception of his plays. Clouds was awarded third (i.e. last) place after its original performance and the text that has come down to the modern age was a subsequent draft that Aristophanes intended to be read rather than acted. The circulation of his plays in manuscript extended their influence beyond the original audience, over whom in fact they seem to have had little or no practical influence: they did not affect the career of Cleon, they failed to persuade the Athenians to pursue an honourable peace with Spartans, and it is not clear that they were instrumental in the trial and execution of Socrates, whose death probably resulted from public animosity towards the philosopher's disgraced associates (such as Alcibiades), exacerbated of course by his own intransigence during the trial. The plays, in manuscript form, have been put to some surprising uses—as indicated earlier, they were used in the study of rhetoric on the recommendation of Quintilian and by students of the Attic dialect in the Fourth and Fifth Centuries AD. It is possible that Plato sent copies of the plays to Dionysius of Syracuse so that he might learn about Athenian life and government.

Latin translations of the plays by Andreas Divus (Venice 1528) were circulated widely throughout Europe in the Renaissance and these were soon followed by translations and adaptations in modern languages. Racine, for example, drew Les Plaideurs (1668) from The Wasps. Goethe (who turned to Aristophanes for a warmer and more vivid form of comedy than he could derive from readings of Terence and Plautus) adapted a short play Die Vögel from The Birds for performance in Weimar. Aristophanes has appealed to both conservatives and radicals in the nineteenth and twentieth centuries—Anatoly Lunacharsky, first Commissar of Enlightenment for the USSR in 1917, declared that the ancient dramatist would have a permanent place in proletarian theatre and yet conservative, Prussian intellectuals interpreted Aristophanes as a satirical opponent of social reform. The avant-gardist stage-director Karolos Koun directed a version of The Birds under the Acropolis in 1959 that established a trend in modern Greek history of breaking taboos through the voice of Aristophanes.

The plays have a significance that goes beyond their artistic function, as historical documents that open the window on life and politics in classical Athens, in which respect they are perhaps as important as the writings of Thucydides. The artistic influence of the plays is immeasurable. They have contributed to the history of European theatre and that history in turn shapes our understanding of the plays. Thus for example the operettas of Gilbert and Sullivan can give us insights into Aristophanes's plays and similarly the plays can give us insights into the operettas. The plays are a source of famous sayings, such as "By words the mind is winged."

Listed below are some of the many works influenced (more or less) by Aristophanes.

=== Literature ===
- The romantic poet, Percy Shelley, wrote a comic, lyrical drama (Swellfoot the Tyrant) in imitation of Aristophanes's play The Frogs after he was reminded of the Chorus in that play by a herd of pigs passing to market under the window of his lodgings in San Giuliano, Italy.
- Aristophanes (particularly in reference to The Clouds) is mentioned frequently by the character Menedemos in the Hellenic Traders series of novels by H. N. Turteltaub.
- A liberal version of the comedies have been published in comic book format, initially by "Agrotikes Ekdoseis" during the 1980s and republished over the years by other companies. The plot was written by Tasos Apostolidis and the sketches were of George Akokalidis. The stories feature either Aristophanes narrating them, directing the play, or even as a character inside one of his stories.
- Irvine, Andrew David (2008). Socrates on Trial: A play based on Aristophanes' Clouds and Plato's Apology, Crito, and Phaedo, adapted for modern performance. Toronto: University of Toronto Press.

=== Radio shows ===
- Acropolis Now is a comedy radio show for the BBC set in Ancient Greece. It features Aristophanes, Socrates and many other famous Greeks. (Not to be confused with the Australian sitcom of the same name.) Aristophanes is characterised as a celebrity playwright, and most of his plays have the title formula: One of Our [e.g] Slaves has an Enormous Knob (a reference to the exaggerated appendages worn by Greek comic actors)
- Aristophanes Against the World was a radio play by Martyn Wade and broadcast on BBC Radio 4. Loosely based on several of his plays, it featured Clive Merrison as Aristophanes.
- The Wasps, radio play adapted by David Pountney, music by Vaughan Williams, recorded 26–28 July 2005, Albert Halls, Bolton, in association with BBC, under Halle label

=== Music ===
- Platée is a French comic opera by Jean-Philippe Rameau influenced by The Frogs.
- Satiric Dances for a Comedy by Aristophanes is a three-movement piece for concert band composed by Norman Dello Joio. It was commissioned in commemoration of the Bicentennial of 19 April 1775 (the start of the American Revolutionary War) by the Concord (Massachusetts) Band. The commission was funded by the Town of Concord and assistance was given by the Eastern National Park and Monument Association in cooperation with the National Park Service.
- Ralph Vaughan Williams wrote The Wasps for a 1909 Cambridge University production of the play.

=== Greek Language ===
- E. Joannides used Aristophanes's comedies as the main source of conversational phrases for his famous Ancient Greek phrasebook Sprechen Sie Attisch? (Do You Speak Attic Greek?).

== Translation of Aristophanes ==
Alan H. Sommerstein believes that although there are good translations of Aristophanes's comedies, none could be flawless, "for there is much truth in the paradox that the only really perfect translation is the original." Nevertheless, there are competent, respectable translations in many languages. Despite the fact that translations of Aristophanes may not be perfect, "the reception of Aristophanes has gained extraordinary momentum as a topic of academic interest in the last few years."

== Works ==
=== Surviving plays ===
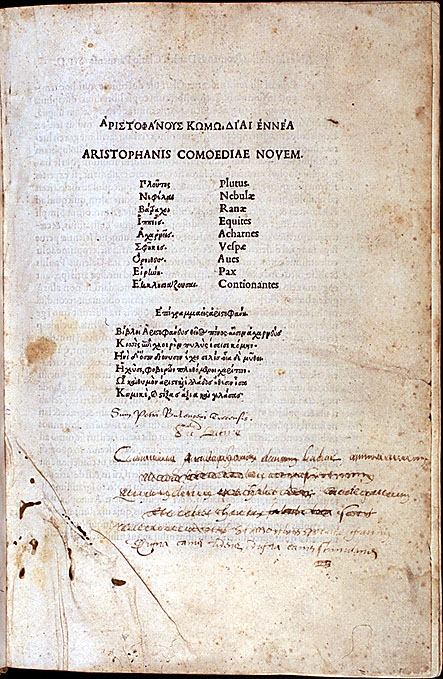
Table of contents of a 1498 edition, which contains all of Aristophanes's surviving plays except for Thesmophoriazusae and Lysistrata

Most of these are traditionally referred to by abbreviations of their Latin titles; Latin remains a customary language of scholarship in classical studies.

- The Acharnians (Ἀχαρνεῖς Akharneis; Attic Ἀχαρνῆς; Acharnenses), 425 BC
- The Knights (Ἱππεῖς Hippeis; Attic Ἱππῆς; Latin: Equites), 424 BC
- The Clouds (Νεφέλαι Nephelai; Latin: Nubes), original 423 BC, incomplete revised version from 419 to 416 BC survives
- The Wasps (Σφῆκες Sphekes; Latin: Vespae), 422 BC
- Peace (Εἰρήνη Eirene; Latin: Pax), first version, 421 BC
- The Birds (Ὄρνιθες Ornithes; Latin: Aves), 414 BC
- Lysistrata (Λυσιστράτη Lysistrate), 411 BC
- Thesmophoriazusae or The Women Celebrating the Thesmophoria (Θεσμοφοριάζουσαι Thesmophoriazousai), first version c. 411 BC
- The Frogs (Βάτραχοι Batrakhoi; Latin: Ranae), 405 BC
- Ecclesiazusae or The Assemblywomen; (Ἐκκλησιάζουσαι Ekklesiazousai), c. 392 BC
- Wealth (Πλοῦτος Ploutos; Latin Plutus) second version, 388 BC

=== Datable non-surviving (lost) plays ===
The standard modern edition of the fragments is Rudolf Kassel and Colin François Lloyd Austin's Poetae Comici Graeci III.2.

- Banqueters (Δαιταλεῖς Daitaleis, 427 BC)
- Babylonians (Βαβυλώνιοι Babylonioi, 426 BC)
- Farmers (Γεωργοί Georgoi, 424 BC)
- Merchant Ships (Ὁλκάδες Holkades, 423 BC)
- Clouds (first version, 423 BC)
- Proagon (Προάγων, 422 BC)
- Amphiaraus (Ἀμφιάραος, 414 BC)
- Plutus (Wealth, first version, 408 BC)
- Gerytades (Γηρυτάδης, uncertain, probably 407 BC)
- Cocalus (Κώκαλος, 387 BC)
- Aiolosicon (Αἰολοσίκων, second version, 386 BC)

=== Undated non-surviving (lost) plays ===
- Aiolosicon (first version)
- Anagyrus (Ἀνάγυρος)
- Frying-Pan Men (Ταγηνισταί Tagenistai)
- Daedalus (Δαίδαλος)
- Danaids (Δαναΐδες Danaides)
- Centaur (Κένταυρος Kentauros)
- Heroes (Ἥρωες)
- Lemnian Women (Λήμνιαι Lemniai)
- Old Age (Γῆρας Geras)
- Peace (second version)
- Phoenician Women (Φοίνισσαι Phoinissai)
- Polyidus (Πολύιδος)
- Seasons (Ὧραι Horai)
- Storks (Πελαργοί Pelargoi)
- Telmessians (Τελμησσεῖς Telmesseis)
- Triphales (Τριφάλης)
- Thesmophoriazusae (Women at the Thesmophoria Festival, second version)
- Women in Tents (Σκηνὰς Καταλαμβάνουσαι Skenas Katalambanousai)

=== Attributed (doubtful, possibly by Archippus) ===
- Dionysus Shipwrecked (Διόνυσος Ναυαγός Dionysos Nauagos)
- Islands (Νῆσοι Nesoi)
- Niobos (Νίοβος)
- Poetry (Ποίησις Poiesis)

== See also ==
- Agathon
- Ancient Greek comedy
- Asteroid 2934 Aristophanes, named after the dramatist
- Greek literature
- Onomasti komodein, the witty personal attack made with total freedom against the most notable individuals
- Hubert Parry wrote music for The Birds
- Theatre of ancient Greece
- Codex Ravennas 429

== Sources ==
- Andrewes, Antony (1981), Greek Society, Pelican Books
- Aristophanes (1906), Hall FW; Geldart WM (eds.), Aristophanis Comoediae Tomus 1, Oxford University Press
- Barrett, David (1964). The Frogs and Other Plays. Penguin Books.
- Barrett, David; Sommerstein, Alan, eds. (2003). The Birds and Other Plays. Penguin Classics.
- David, Ephraim (1984). Aristophanes and Athenian Society of the Early Fourth Century B.C. Leiden: Brill.
- Dover, K. J. (1970a). Aristophanic Comedy. University of California Press. ISBN 9780520022119.
- Dover, K. J. (1970b). Aristophanes, The Clouds. Oxford University Press.
- Edwards, Anthony T. (1991). "Aristophanes' comic poetics". Transactions of the American Philological Association. 121: 157–179. doi:10.2307/284450. JSTOR 284450.
- Fontaine, Michael; Scafuro, Adele C. (2014). The Oxford Handbook of Greek and Roman Comedy. Oxford University Press. ISBN 978-0-19-974354-4.
- Hall, Edith & Wrigley, Amanda (2007). Aristophanes in Performance 421 BC – AD 2007: Peace, Birds and Frogs. Legenda (Oxford).
- Handley E (1985), "Comedy", in Easterling P, Knox B (eds.), The Cambridge History of Classical Literature: Greek Literature, Cambridge University Press
- Kassel, Rudolf & Austin, Colin (1984), Poetae Comici Graeci, vol. III.2, De Gruyter (Berlin)
- Lamb, W. R. M. (1975), Plato, vol. 3, Loeb Classical Library
- Levi P (1986), "Greek Drama", in Boardman J, Griffin J, Murray O (eds.), The Oxford History of the Classical World, Oxford University Press
- Loscalzo, Donato (2010). Aristofane e la coscienza felice. Edizioni dell'Orso. ISBN 978-88-6274-245-0.
- MacDowell, Douglas M. (1978) [1971]. Wasps (First Edition, Second Impression ed.). Oxford: Oxford University Press. ISBN 9780198141822.
- Marianetti, Marie C. (1997). The Clouds: An Annotated Translation. University Press of America. ISBN 978-0-7618-0588-5.
- Parker, L. P. E. (1997), The Songs of Aristophanes, Oxford University Press
- Reckford, Kenneth J. (1987), Aristophanes' Old-and-new Comedy, UNC Press
- Rennie, W. (1909), The Acharnians of Aristophanes, Edward Arnold (reproduced by Bibliolife)
- Rosen, Ralph (1999), "Introduction", Aristophanes, vol. 3, University of Pennsylvania Press (Penn Greek Drama Series)
- Roman, Luke; Roman, Monica (2010). Encyclopedia of Greek and Roman Mythology. Infobase Publishing. ISBN 978-1438126395.
- Slater, Niall (2016). "Aristophanes in antiquity: Reputation and reception". In Walsh, Philip (ed.). Brill's Companion to the Reception of Aristophanes. Brill. ISBN 9789004324657.
- Silk, M. S. (2002), Aristophanes and the Definition of Comedy, Oxford University Press
- Sidwell, Keith (2009). Aristophanes the Democrat: The Politics of Satirical Comedy During the Peloponnesian War. Cambridge University Press. ISBN 978-0-521-51998-4.
- Somerstein, Alan (1973), Aristophanes: Lysistrata, The Acharnians, The Clouds, Penguin Books
- Storey, Ian (1998), "Introduction", Clouds, Wasps, Birds By Aristophanes, translation by Peter Meineck, Hackett Publishing
- Thorburn, John E. (2005). The Facts on File Companion to Classical Drama. Infobase Publishing. ISBN 978-0-8160-7498-3.
- Van Steen G (2007), "Politics and Aristophanes: watchword Caution!", in McDonald M, Walton JM (eds.), The Cambridge Companion to Greek and Roman Theatre, Cambridge University Press
- Welsh, D. (1983), "IG ii2 2343, Philonides and Aristophanes' Banqueters", Classical Quarterly, vol. 33
- Jeffrey Henderson, Professor of Classics at University of Southern California (1991). The Maculate Muse: Obscene Language in Attic Comedy. Oxford University Press. ISBN 978-0-19-536199-5.
  - reviewed by W. J. Slater, Phoenix, Vol. 30, No. 3 (Autumn, 1976), pp. 291–293 doi:10.2307/1087300
- Lee, Jae Num. "Scatology in Continental Satirical Writings from Aristophanes to Rabelais" and "English Scatological Writings from Skelton to Pope." Swift and Scatological Satire. Albuquerque: U of New Mexico P, 1971. 7–22; 23–53.
- Murray, Gilbert (1933). Aristophanes: A Study. Oxford and New York: Oxford University Press.
- Platter, Charles (2006). Aristophanes and the Carnival of Genres. JHUP. ISBN 978-0-8018-8527-3.
- G. M. Sifakis The Structure of Aristophanic Comedy The Journal of Hellenic Studies, Vol. 112, 1992 (1992), pp. 123–142 doi:10.2307/632156
- Taaffe, L. K. (1993). Aristophanes and Women. London and New York: Routledge.
- Ussher, Robert Glenn (1979). Aristophanes. Oxford: Clarendon Press.
- Van Steen, Gonda. 2000 Venom in Verse: Aristophanes in Modern Greece. Princeton University Press.
- Jstor.org, The American Journal of Philology, 1996.
- Life, death and Aristophanes' concept of Eros in Saul Bellow's "Ravelstein".
