= Langrishe Place, Methodist Chapel =

Methodist chapel in Dublin 1, Ireland

Coordinates: 53.35511°N 6.25640°W

Langrishe Place, Methodist Chapel or Langrishe Hall was a Methodist Chapel established in Langrishe Place, Summerhill, Dublin, it was to provide a place for the congregation from the Free Church, Great Charles Street, Dublin (called the Wesley Chapel), which was too big for their numbers, and the congregation were unable to clear the debt on the Charles St. church. Originally set up in a rented premise in Langrishe Place in 1825, enlarged in 1830, the premises along with two houses were purchased and the chapel was rebuilt in 1835.

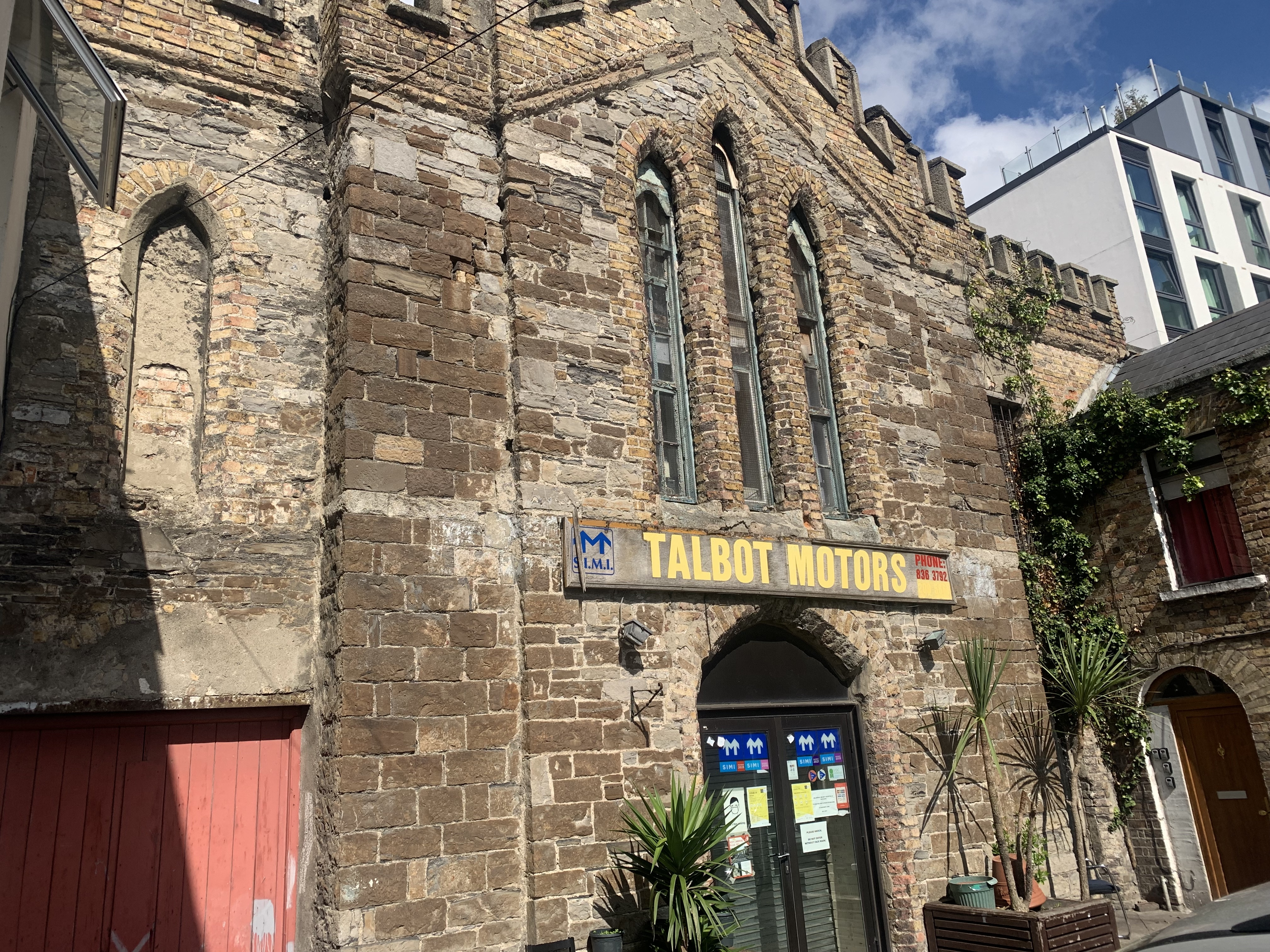
Langrishe Place Methodist Chapel in 2022

The original chapel opened on January 1, 1826 by Rev. Adam Averell, was under the auspices of the Primitive Wesleyan Society (who favoured the movement remaining within the established Church of Ireland), it was the third such chapel. Primitive Methodist movement had been established in Ireland in 1818 and the Great Charles Street members were part of that movement, Rev. Averell was one of the signatories to the societies guidelines.

It was sold in 1882. And used as a schoolhouse (Saint Mary's National School), today it is used by Talbot motors, the gothic styled gable wall still standing and a protected structure stands at the end of Langrishe Place. In 1882 the congregation moved to a United Methodist Church on (the Primitive Wesleyans ending the schism from the Wesleyan Church) Jones Road, Clonliffe, Drumcondra (facing what is now Croke Park), along with the congregation from Oriel Street. Jones road Methodist church closed in 1949 and was finally fully demolished following a legal challenge in 2011.

The playwright Sean O'Casey worked as a janitor at No 10 Langrishe Place, which had been the methodist chapel, it had subsequently been a parish dispensary, a school and the branch of the Irish National Foresters Society. Langrishe Hall, was taken over in 1919 by James Larkin's sister Delia along with a number of others including Sean O'Casey, ran as the Irish Workers' Club and used for meetings and performances. It was also used for the storage of waste paper prior to being used by Talbot motors.
