= James Nunn (artist) =

British illustrator, print maker, and book cover artist

- Occupation(s): Illustrator and print maker
- Known for: Book cover artist
- Website: jamesnunn.co.uk

James Nunn (born in 1973 in Yorkshire) is a British illustrator, print maker, and book cover artist. He is best known for the panda artwork on the cover of Lynn Truss's bestseller Eats, Shoots & Leaves, and for creating many of the covers in the Shortest History book series. He also created The Corbyn Colouring Book, a colouring book themed on Jeremy Corbyn, and illustrated Colouring the Tour de France (2016), written by William Fotheringham. His artistic practice focuses on drawing and printmaking. In 2024, he won the Academy of British Cover Design's award in the young adult category for the cover of Federico Ivanier's Never tell anyone your name.

== Bibliography ==
=== Works created ===
- 2015 The Corbyn Colouring Book ISBN 9781910400401 OCLC 1127946427

=== Works illustrated ===
- 2003 Eats, Shoots & Leaves by Lynne Truss ISBN 9781861976123 OCLC 55019487
- 2005 Comrade Pavlik: The Rise and Fall of a Soviet Boy Hero by Catriona Kelly ISBN 9781862077478 OCLC 64555773
- 2008 'Fail Better!: The worlds worst marketers and what we can learn from them by Stephen Brown ISBN 9780462099040
- 2018 The Time In Between by Marcello Fois, translated by Silvester Mazzarella
- 2019 White Horse by Yan Ge, translated by Nicky Harman ISBN 9781908446985
- 2021 Hinton, by Mark Blacklock ISBN 9781783785216
- 2021, 2022 The shortest history of Greece by James Heneage ISBN 9781910400876, 9781760643812 OCLC 1295118411, 1322163679
- 2021 The shortest history of war by Gwynne Dyer ISBN 9781910400845 OCLC 1153525560
- 2023 Pig Ignorant: A Teenage Memoir by Nicholas Fisk ISBN 9781910898840
- 2024 Slightly Foxed Issue 80, ‘Now We Are 20’
