= Nun (disambiguation) =

A nun is a member of a religious community of women.

Nun, Nuns or NUN may also refer to:

- Nun (band), an Australian music group
- Nun (biblical figure)
- Nun (letter), in many Semitic alphabets
- Nun languages, a group of Eastern Grassfields languages
- Nun Mountain, a summit in Alaska
- Nun pigeon
- Nun River, Nigeria
- Nun (mythology), an Egyptian god
- Nun (fish), genus of fish
- Nun, a mountain of the Nun Kun massif in Kashmir, India
- Nun, the fish Oxynoemacheilus galilaeus
- NUN, IATA code for Saufley Field airport, Pensacola, Florida, U.S.
- NUN, National Rail station code for Nuneaton railway station, UK
- Nun, a Latin abbreviation for the nundinae market days
- Naruto: Ultimate Ninja, a series of anime fighting games
  - Naruto: Ultimate Ninja Storm, a seventh generation fighting game
- Nun, Japanese onomatopoeia for the noises deer make

== See also ==
- The Nun (disambiguation)
- Nunn (disambiguation)
