= Acropolis Now (radio) =

BBC Radio comedy series, 2000 to 2002

- Genre: Comedy
- Running time: 30 minutes
- Country of origin: United Kingdom
- Language(s): English
- Home station: BBC Radio 4
- Starring: Stephen Moore, Alan Cox, Robert Hardy, Tom George
- Written by: Lynne Truss
- Original release: 19 December 2000 – 9 April 2002
- No. of series: 2
- No. of episodes: 12

Acropolis Now is a BBC Radio sitcom set in Ancient Greece, written by Lynne Truss. It was broadcast on BBC Radio 4 in two series in 2000 and 2002, with subsequent reruns on BBC 7 (later BBC Radio 4 Extra) in 2006, 2007, 2008, 2009, 2010 and 2012. The show follows the fictional adventures of historical Greek characters in Athens: Heraclitus, Aristophanes, Socrates, Plato, Xanthippe, and the Oracle. It is loosely narrated by a chorus, in the convention of Greek dramas (the Chorus was dispensed with in the second series).

Aristophanes, in addition to being a playwright (all of his plays have the title "One of Our [Subject] Has An Enormous Knob"), owns a seafood restaurant near the Acropolis; just before the series begins, he "rescues" his philosopher brother Heraclitus from the bush he had been living in. With Athens under siege by the Spartans, Heraclitus reluctantly takes charge of the food preparation area, with Socrates appreciating Heraclitus more for his cooking than for his stoicism. Aristophanes and Heraclitus's mother, identified only as the Oracle, is a former Pythia who took a sabbatical from Delphi because the "signs" she sees in her visions are commonplace 20th century traffic signs and posters. Xanthippe is a pervert, that is a heterosexual, in a society where homosexuality is normal. She has a crush on Socrates' friend Plato, who is oblivious to her advances. Frequent mention is made of Cynthia the Contortionist Flute-girl in suggestive contexts, but she never appears in person.

The nature of the chorus varies from episode to episode. It may be the fish deliverymen on their daily round, a gang of former Olympians looking for a free meal, a band of sex-mad Spartans or the "unbelievably affable ones" (cheerful versions of the Furies) come to collect Socrates and take him to Hades. Several male voices speak in unison, with a lead voice underlining the occasional detail. The chorus was largely abandoned for the second series, with Heraclitus instead providing a brief introduction starting with the fact that he hates Athens.

== Cast ==
- Stephen Moore as Heraclitus, Aristophanes' brother, Chief Restaurant Cook and tormentor.
- Alan Cox as Aristophanes, playwright, poet, orator, and restaurateur.
- Robert Hardy as Socrates
- Tom George as Plato, Socrates' pupil, who will never amount to much
- Rosemary Leach as The Oracle, mother of Heraclitus and Aristophanes.
- Rachel Atkins as Xanthippe, wife of Socrates, and deviant heterosexual (Imelda Staunton in Series 2)
- Gavin Muir as Chorus, Alcibiades, Shepherd, Uncle Liquidites

== Series 1 ==
- Fish - The audience is introduced to all the people who own/frequent the restaurant and The Oracle brings disturbing news for Aristophanes.
- Games - To avenge Aristophanes' insult to former Olympic champions, Plato (himself an Olympic champion) challenges Aristophanes to a race.
- Gods - On Socrates' 85th birthday, "The Affable Ones" arrive to take him away for judgment in the Underworld ... and Aristophanes may be next!
- Heroes - Alcibiades, a former Athenian hero (and narcissist) returns after having defected to Sparta ... in the middle of a "Frenzy"-ing craze.
- War - A group of Spartans arrive as part of a course in Athenian Culture given by Socrates, but they don't seem to be in the mood for culture ... only staying in a bad mood (which is normal for Spartans), but when Xanthippe shows up they start feeling "something else" (as does she).
- Sheep - Heraclitus' woolly former "girlfriend" Cassandra turns up expecting Heraclitus to be the greatest thinker in Athens, and he, Socrates, Plato and friends do battle in the Intellectual Olympics.

== Series 2 ==
- Signs - Athens is being besieged by the Spartans and things are beginning to look bleak, especially when Uncle Liquidites turns up and demands that Plato give up philosophy and enter the funerary urn business.
- Love - It's Eros Night and despite the hunger, all thoughts turn to love. But the recipients of that love (and the traditional site of love) aren't the expected choice (spoiler: it isn't the heart).
- Plays - Due to his latest play being put on at the Ephesus Festival, Aristophanes has a safe conduct to leave Athens. However, when he sprains his ankle, Heraclitus plans to use the pass to escape Athens ... but if the play is performed, it will mean exposing Xanthippe to scorn and ridicule.
- Sons - As food runs out, a man called Testiclēs arrives at the restaurant claiming to be the Oracle's long-lost son.
- Sauce - Customers drop like flies after Heraclitus adds a little hemlock to the cockroach fritters, and Xanthippe has finally had enough and leaves Socrates.
- Food - With starvation looking Athens and all our friends in the face, the restaurant regulars decide to have a "Last Supper" ... no food, just fine words, songs and ... hemlock.
