= Adam Averell =

Irish clergyman (1754–1847)

Adam Averell (1754–1847) was an Irish primitive Wesleyan clergyman.

Averell was born on 7 May 1754 at Mullan, County Tyrone, where his family had settled in the sixteenth century. His parents were of the established church, and related to Dr. John Averell, bishop of Limerick, who died in 1771, aged 58. In 1773 Averell went to Trinity College Dublin, the provost being the Right Hon. Francis Andrews, nephew of Bishop Averell. In 1774 he became private tutor to Sir Richard St. George. He was ordained at Clonfert Cathedral by the Church of Ireland, Bishop Walter Cope on 25 July 1777, but took no charge. At this period he met John Wesley in Dublin, and heard him preach. In 1781 he went to Eton with his pupils; the next year he became alienated from his patron, St. George.

On 18 December 1785 he married the daughter and heiress of the Rev. R. Gregory of Tentower, Queen's County. He was at this time in the habit of preaching against the Methodists, and lived as a man of the world, enjoying cards, hunting, and dancing. Two circumstances produced a change—the reading of Wesley's 'Appeal,' and an illness which seized him during some private theatricals. Becoming evangelical in his views and habits, he acted as curate to Dr. Ledwich at Aghaboe from 1789 to 1791. He was offered in 1792 a curacy at Madeley, but preferred to exercise a gratuitous ministry nearer home. On 7 October, 1792 he preached for the first time to a Methodist congregation; in 1796 the Dublin conference admitted him to full connection. In 1797 he was separated from his wife. In the division which was the result of the controversy respecting the administration of the sacraments by the preachers (1814–1818), Averell took a prominent part with the conservatives who adhered to Wesley's polity, declaring on 21 January 1818 at Clones that the Methodists "are not a church but a religious society." The first meeting of the Primitive Wesleyan Methodist Conference was held on 10 July 1818; Averell was elected president, and constantly re-elected until after 1841, when his infirmities led him to decline office. He opened the Primitive Wesleyan, Langrishe Place, Methodist Chapel, Dublin, in 1826. The primitive Wesleyan body he represented (re-united since 1878, with few exceptions, to the Irish Wesleyan Conference) must not be confounded with the primitive Methodists of English origin.

He died on 16 January 1847.
