= Nun galilaeus =

Conservation status
- Critically Endangered (IUCN 3.1)

Scientific classification
- Kingdom: Animalia
- Phylum: Chordata
- Class: Actinopterygii
- Order: Cypriniformes
- Family: Nemacheilidae
- Genus: Nun
- Species: N. galilaeus

Binomial name
- Nun galilaeus (Günther, 1864)

Synonyms
- Cobitis galilaea Günther, 1864; Nemacheilus galilaeus (Günther, 1864); Nemachilus galilaeus (Günther, 1864); Oxynoemacheilus galilaeus (Günther, 1864)

Species of fish

Nun galilaeus, also known as the Galilean stone loach, is a species of stone loach in the family Nemacheilidae native to Israel and Syria.

== Description ==
Nun galilaeus has the elongated, subcylindrical body shape typical of stone loaches with its mean depth being 15.5% of its length. That of the caudal peduncle being 10.4% while the head makes up a mean of 21.2% of the standard length. The origin of the dorsal fin sits in front of the vertical origin of the pelvic fin. The dorsal fin has a slightly convex to near straight upper margin and 4-5 unbranched and 9-11 branched rays. The anal fin has 3-4 unbranched and 5-6 branched rays. The caudal fin is slightly emarginated, but can look truncated. The body is scaleless and the lateral line extends to the anal fin. The lip is thick and has an irregular outline and there are three pairs of barbels around the mouth, one maxillio-mandibular pair and two rostral pairs. The body colour is generally a light yellowish brown with an irregular pattern of grey brown mottles and a varying number of diffuse bars or blotches which can fuse towards the caudal fin for vertical stripes.

== Distribution and habitat ==
Nun galilaeus is known with certainty from two lakes in the drainage basin of the River Jordan, Lake Hula in Israel and the smaller Lake Muzairib in Syria. It has been extirpated from Lake Hula and Lake Muzairib is affected by moderate pollution and a declining water level due to over abstraction and low rainfall. However, the species is said to be still abundant in that lake. It has been reported from a third lake, Lake Tiberias, but that is now thought to be a mislabelled specimen. It is a lake species which can be found near the lake shores. It can also be found in very slow flowing, almost stagnant water in the tributaries to Lake Muzairib where it lives among stones and the roots of willows.
