= Lynne Truss =

English writer (born 1955)

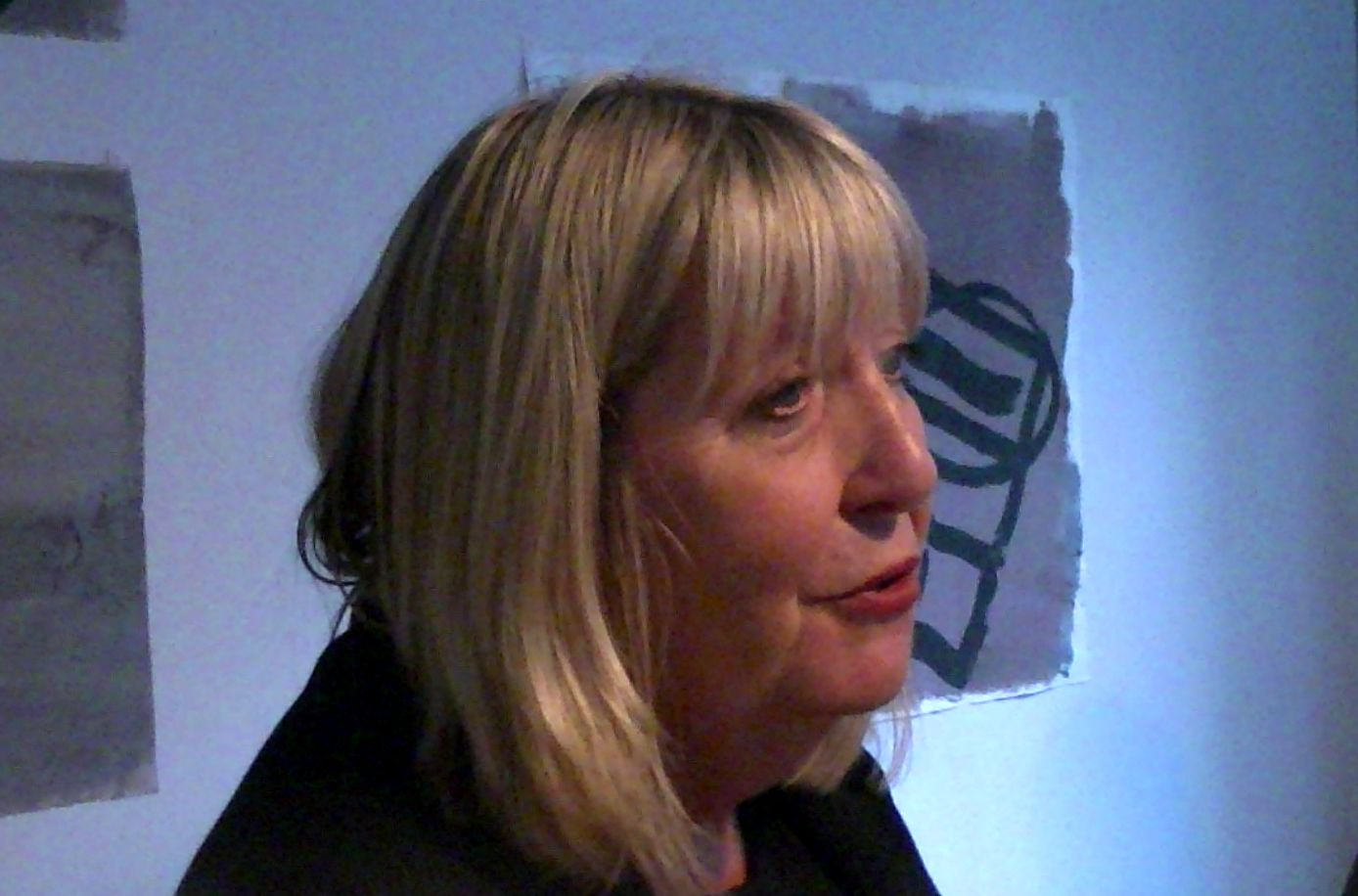
- Truss in 2015
- Born: 31 May 1955 (age 71); Kingston upon Thames, Surrey, England
- Occupations: Author, journalist
- Website: lynnetruss.com

Lynne Truss (born 31 May 1955) is an English author, journalist, novelist, and radio broadcaster and dramatist. She champions correctness and aesthetics in the English language, which is the subject of her 2003 book, Eats, Shoots & Leaves: The Zero Tolerance Approach to Punctuation. The book was inspired by a BBC Radio 4 show about punctuation, Cutting a Dash, which she presented.

Besides her promotion of linguistic prescription and commentary on English grammar, Truss has written many radio plays, both comedic and dramatic. She has also written grammar guides for children, and novels including crime fiction. She was inducted into the Detection Club in 2021.

== Early life ==
Truss was born on 31 May 1955 in Kingston upon Thames. She was educated at the Tiffin Girls' School and University College London, where she was awarded a first-class degree in English Language and Literature.

== Career ==
Truss began her media career as a literary editor. She then spent six years as a television critic for The Times, before moving into sports journalism for the same newspaper. She spent four years in the latter field and in 2009 wrote a book about her experiences with it, Get Her Off the Pitch: How Sport Took Over My Life.

In 2004, Truss was elected a Fellow of the Royal Society of Literature.

== Politics ==
In August 2014, Truss was one of 200 public figures who were signatories to a letter to The Guardian expressing their hope that Scotland would vote to remain part of the United Kingdom in September's referendum on that issue.

== Works ==
=== Novels ===
- With One Lousy Free Packet of Seed – Hamish Hamilton (1994) ISBN 978-0-241-13410-8; Penguin (1995) ISBN 0-14-017938-0; Profile Books (2004) ISBN 1-86197-749-2
- Tennyson's Gift – Hamish Hamilton (1996) ISBN 0-241-13521-4; Penguin (1997) ISBN 0-14-024671-1; Profile Books (2004) ISBN 1-86197-733-6
- Going Loco – Review (Hodder Headline) (1999) ISBN 0-7472-5965-8; Profile Books (2004) ISBN 1-86197-733-6
- Cat Out of Hell – Hammer (2014) ISBN 978-0-09-958534-3
- The Lunar Cats (2017) ISBN 978-1-7847-5688-8
- A Shot in the Dark (A Constable Twitten Mystery) – Raven Books (2018) ISBN 978-1-4088-9051-6
- The Man That Got Away: A Constable Twitten Mystery (2019) ISBN 978-1-6355-7073-1
- Murder by Milk Bottle (A Constable Twitten Mystery) (2020) ISBN 978-1-5266-0979-3
- Psycho by the Sea (A Constable Twitten Mystery) (2021) ISBN 978-1-5266-0987-8

=== Non-fiction ===
- Making the Cat Laugh: One Woman's Journal of Single Life on the Margins (1995)
- Tennyson and his Circle (1999)
- Eats, Shoots & Leaves: The Zero Tolerance Approach to Punctuation (2003)
- Glued to the Goggle Box: 50 Years of British TV with Freeze-Frames (2003) – with John Minnion
- Talk to the Hand: The Utter Bloody Rudeness of Everyday Life (2005)
- Get Her Off the Pitch: How Sport Took Over My Life (2009)

=== Children's books ===
- The Girl's Like Spaghetti: Why, You Can't Manage Without Apostrophes! (2007)
- Twenty-Odd Ducks: Why, Every Punctuation Mark Counts (2008)

=== Collections and published scripts ===
- A Certain Age: Twelve Monologues From the Classic Radio Series – Profile Books (2007) ISBN 1-86197-879-0
- Giving Up the Ghost – BBC Radio 4 (2008)

=== Selected radio series ===
- Acropolis Now – set in Ancient Greece (2000–2002)
- A Certain Age (BBC Audio Collection, two vols.) – BBC Audiobooks (2005, 2007) ISBN 0-563-51052-8, ISBN 1-4056-7687-6
- Inspector Steine – set in a 1950s English police station (2007–2013)
- Gossip from the Garden Pond (2014)
- Rumblings from the Rafters (2016)

This list excludes standalone plays.
