= Nunn (crater) =

Crater on the Moon

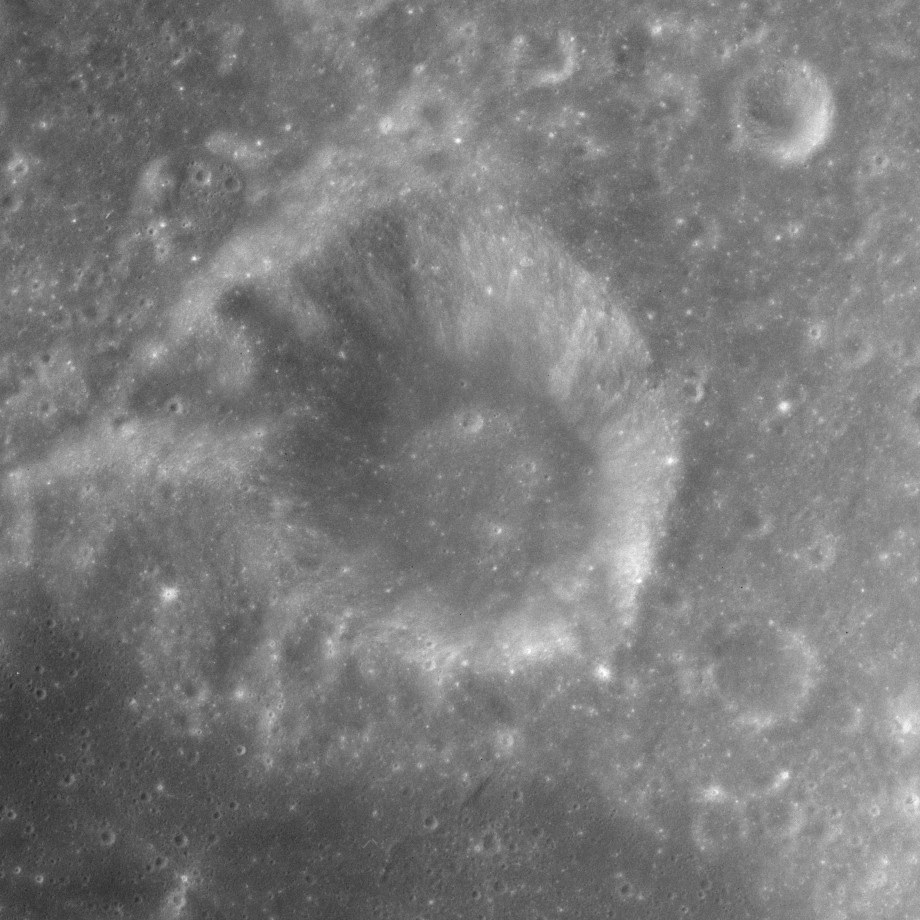
- Apollo 16 Mapping Camera image
- Coordinates: 4.6°N 91.1°E
- Diameter: 19 km
- Depth: 1.3 km
- Colongitude: 269° at sunrise
- Eponym: Joseph Nunn

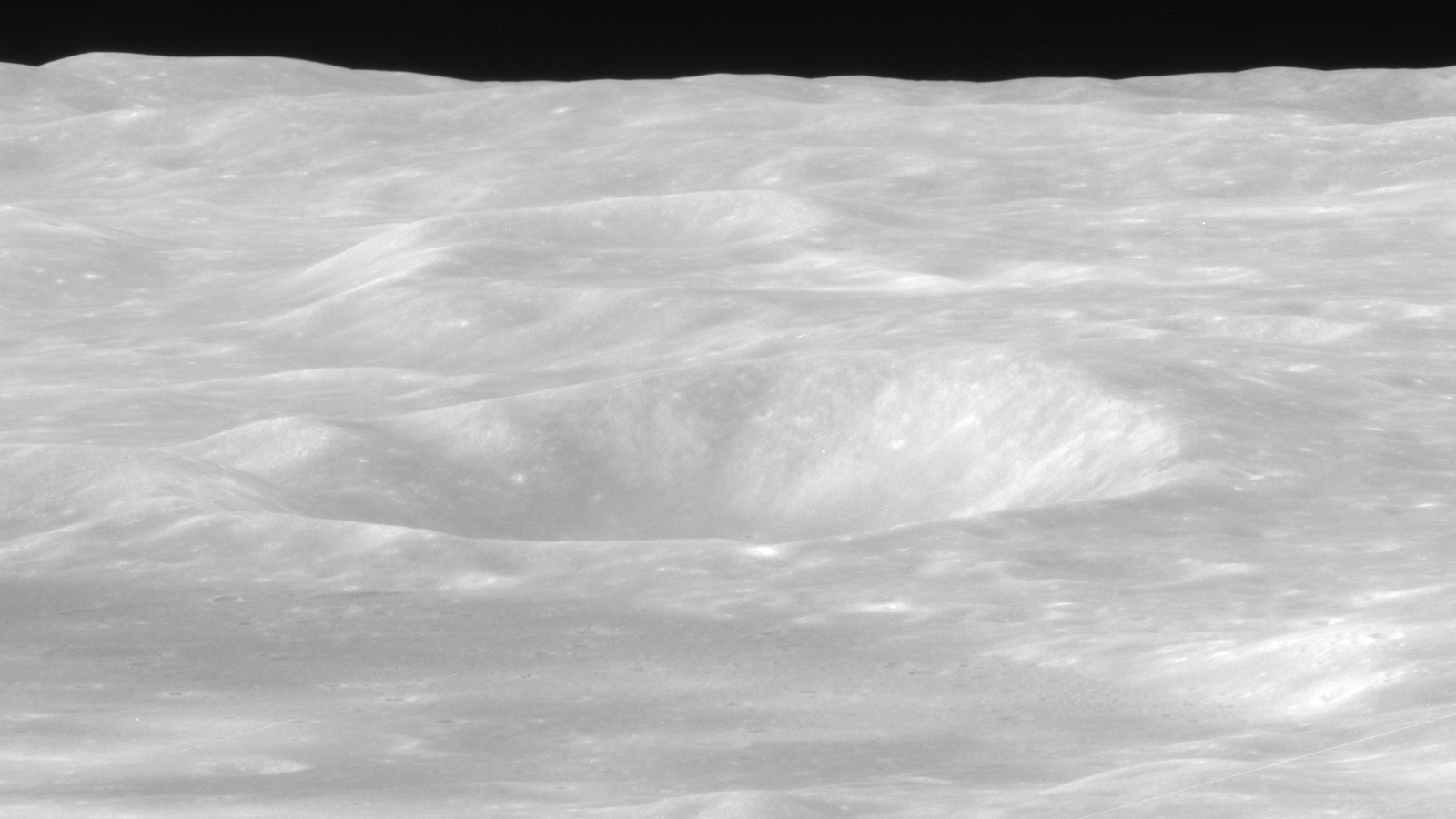
Oblique view from Apollo 17

Nunn is a lunar impact crater that is located just beyond the eastern limb of the Moon, along the northern edge of Mare Smythii. It was named after American engineer Joseph Nunn. To the east of this crater is the much larger Babcock, and to the northwest is Jansky.

This is a circular, bowl-shaped crater with some impact wear along the northwestern rim and to a lesser degree along the southeastern edge. The remainder of the crater perimeter is relatively free of erosion, and the edge is well-defined. The darker-hued interior floor is about half the crater diameter, and is level and almost featureless.
