= Joseph Nunn =

American engineer

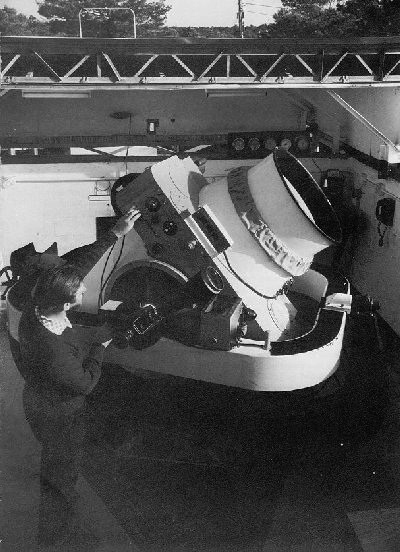
The Baker-Nunn satellite tracking camera.

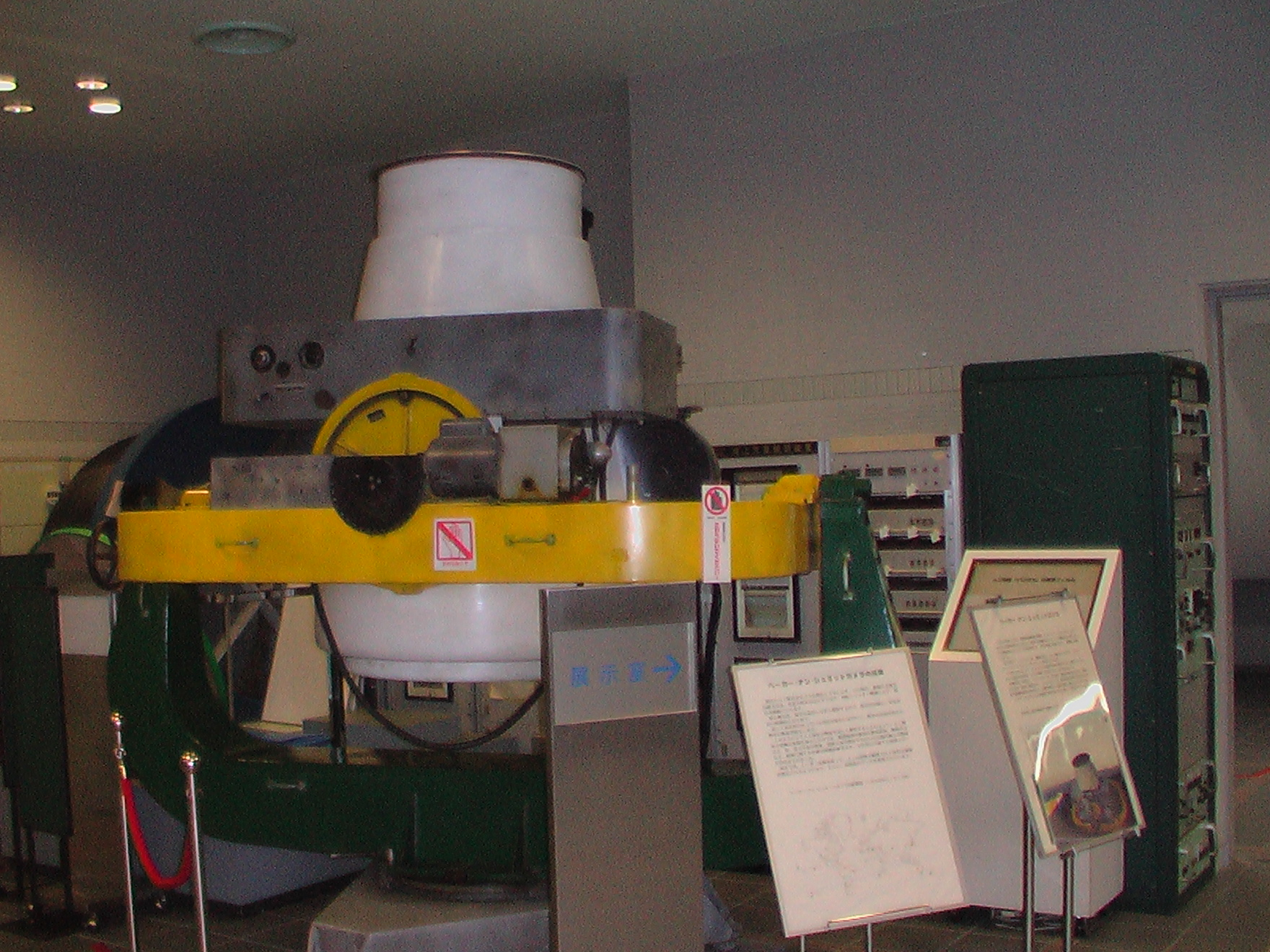
Baker-Nunn camera

Joseph Nunn (1905–1968) was an American engineer.

In 1956 he worked in collaboration with Dr. James G. Baker to design and manufacture a series of satellite tracking cameras. These were called Baker-Nunn cameras after their designers, and consisted of a very precise tracking system combined with an unusually large, wide-field camera for photographing large areas of the sky. Joseph Nunn was responsible for designing the mechanical elements of these cameras, while Dr. Baker worked on the camera. The optics were fabricated by the Perkin-Elmer Corporation, and the camera was assembled by Boller and Chivens.

This camera provided tracking data on the Soviet Union's Sputnik I satellite. An STP network of the 12 cameras were built by August 1958. The cameras remained in operation until 1991, when they were decommissioned. At least one of the cameras was later refurbished for use in the Asteroid tracking program.

Joseph Nunn lived in Pasadena and San Marino, California. He was a nephew of American entrepreneur and educator L.L. Nunn.

The crater Nunn on the Moon is named after him.
