= Alf Nunn =

English footballer

Personal information
- Full name: Alfred Sydney Nunn
- Date of birth: 15 November 1899
- Place of birth: Holborn, England
- Date of death: 1946 (aged 46–47)
- Position: Winger

Senior career*
Years	Team	Apps	(Gls)
1920–1924	Clapton Orient	19	(0)
1924–1927	Folkestone		
1927–1928	Luton Town	14	(3)
1928	Hugonians		
Total		33	(3)
- * Club domestic league appearances and goals

Alfred Sydney Nunn (15 November 1899 – 1946) was an English footballer who played in the Football League for Clapton Orient and Luton Town.
