= Steering the Craft =

1998 book by Ursula K. Le Guin

Steering the Craft: Exercises and Discussions on Story Writing for the Lone Mariner and the Mutinous Crew
- First edition
- Author: Ursula K. Le Guin
- Language: English
- Publisher: The Eighth Mountain Press (hardback); Mariner (second edition, paperback)
- Publication date: April 1, 1998; September 1, 2015 (second edition)
- Publication place: United States
- Media type: Print (Hardcover & Paperback)
- Pages: 180 pp (first edition); 160 pp (second edition)
- ISBN: 9780544611610
- OCLC: 37878636

Steering the Craft: Exercises and Discussions on Story Writing for the Lone Mariner and the Mutinous Crew is a 1998 nonfiction book by Ursula K. Le Guin. Developed from a writers' workshop led by Le Guin, the book contains self-guided exercises and discussions focused on the craft of narrative prose.

In 2015, Le Guin published a revised and rewritten edition of the book with a new subtitle: Steering the Craft: A Twenty-First-Century Guide to Sailing the Sea of Story.
