= Robert Nunn (American football) =

American football coach (born 1965)

Cincinnati Bearcats
- Title: Quality control coach

Personal information
- Born: June 10, 1965 (age 61); Apache, Oklahoma, U.S.

Career information
- College: Oklahoma State (1984–1987)

Career history
- Northeastern Oklahoma A&M (1988) Defensive line coach; Tennessee (1989–1990) Defensive ends coach; Georgia Military (1991) Defensive coordinator; Georgia Military (1992–1999) Head coach; Miami Dolphins (2000) Defensive assistant; Miami Dolphins (2001–2002) Assistant defensive line & defensive quality control coach; Washington Redskins (2003) Defensive line coach; Miami Dolphins (2004) Special assistant coach; Green Bay Packers (2005–2008) Defensive tackles coach; Tampa Bay Buccaneers (2009) Defensive line coach; New York Giants (2010–2015) Defensive line coach; Cleveland Browns (2016) Defensive line coach; New York Jets (2017–2018) Defensive line coach; Appalachian State (2020–2022) Defensive line coach; Cincinnati Bearcats (2023–present) Defensive quality control coach

Awards and highlights
- Super Bowl champion (XLVI)

Robert Nunn (born June 10, 1965) is an American football coach who is currently a defensive quality control coach at the University of Cincinnati. Nunn served as the head football coach at Georgia Military College from 1992 to 1999, compiling a record of 67–17 in eight seasons. He played college football as a linebacker at Oklahoma State University.

Nunn joined the Green Bay Packers on February 8, 2005, as the defensive tackles coach, but was let go along with the majority of the defensive coaching staff after a disappointing 2008 season. Nunn was hired several weeks later by the Tampa Bay Buccaneers as one of two defensive line coaches.

On January 27, 2010, Nunn was hired as the New York Giants defensive line coach. He was part of the staff that won Super Bowl XLVI over the New England Patriots.

== Head coaching record ==
Year	Team	Overall	Conference	Standing	Bowl/playoffs
Georgia Military Bulldogs (NJCAA independent) (1992–1999)
1992	Georgia Military	6–3			
1993	Georgia Military	6–4			L Midwest Bowl
1994	Georgia Military	10–1			
1995	Georgia Military	10–1			W Golden Isles Bowl
1996	Georgia Military	8–1			
1997	Georgia Military	8–4			L Golden Isles Bowl
1998	Georgia Military	9–2			L Golden Isles Bowl
1999	Georgia Military	10–1			W Golden Isles Bowl
Georgia Military:		67–17			
Total:		67–17			
