= Marianne Nunn =

- Born: 17 May 1778; Colchester?
- Died: 1847 (aged 68–69)

Marianne Nunn (17 May 1778 – 1847) was a British hymn writer.

== Life ==
Nunn was possibly born in Colchester as her father John Nunn lived there. Marianne had two younger brothers John and William. John Nunn published a book of hymns in 1817 that included the hymn "One there is above all others, O how he loves" which was an adaptation of a hymn by John Newton that Nunn had adapted to the Welsh tune Ar hyd y nos. The hymn had a number of variants and was popular with children.

Nunn was included in the Dictionary of National Biography with an entry written by James Cuthbert Hadden. Nunn never married and died in 1847.
