= Women in Euripides =

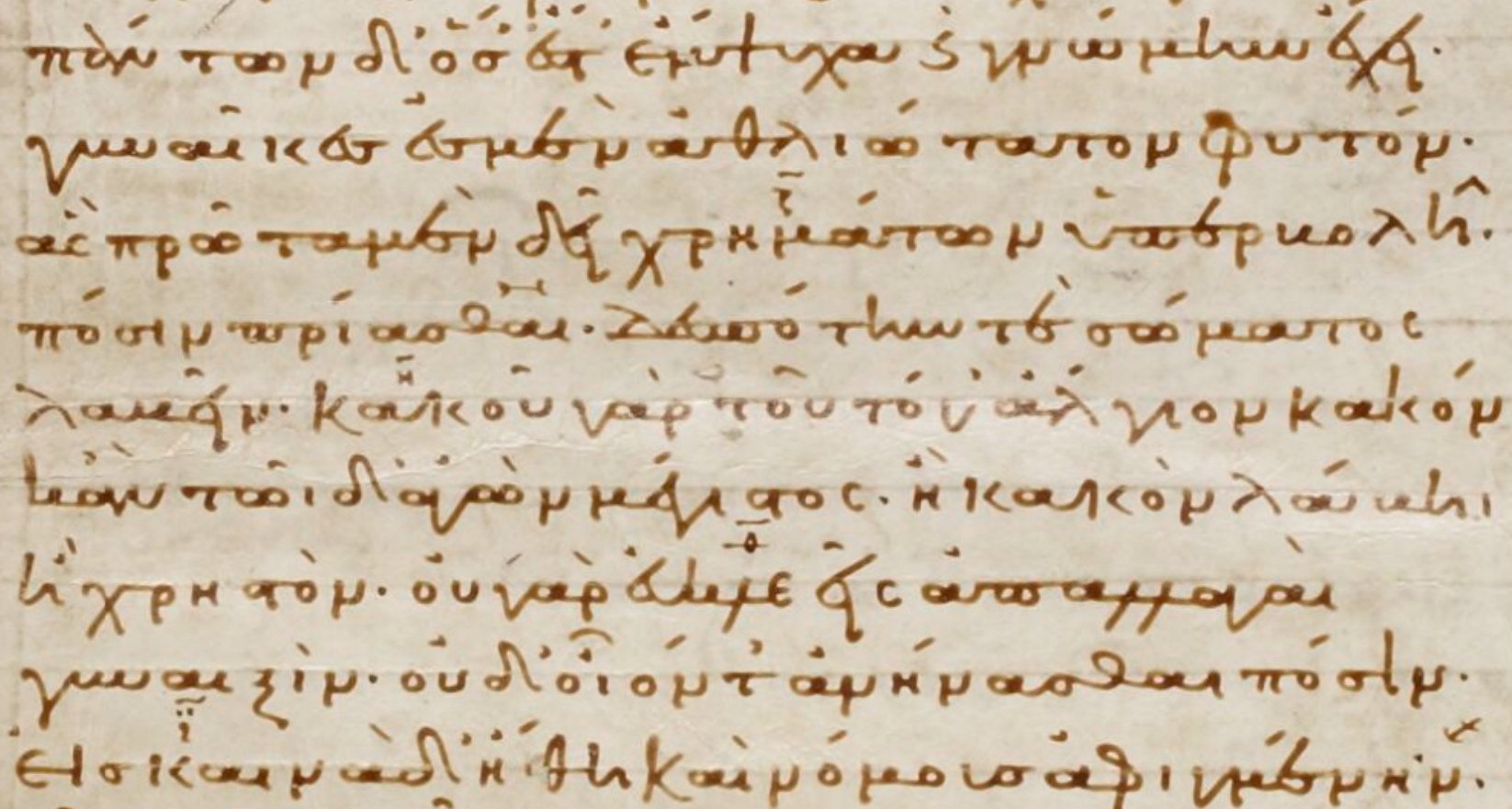
Part of Medea's 'feminist' tirade, Grec 2713, Bibliothèque nationale de France (BnF) (112r), 10th–11th century.

Euripides (c. 480 – c. 406 BC) is one of the authors of classical Greece who took a particular interest in the condition of women within the Greek world. In a predominantly patriarchal society, he undertook, through his works, to explore and sometimes challenge the injustices faced by women and certain social or moral norms concerning them. His female characters, often endowed with detailed psychology and artistic depth, were central to his tragedies and made up almost all of his characters who thought and philosophized. Euripides portrayed women not only as capable of possessing true intelligence but also used them to convey critiques of the condition of women to the audience of his plays.

The playwright developed a series of original literary or artistic techniques to humanize his female characters, offering them a unique capacity for action and thought within Greek tragedy. He frequently subverted myths to rework the roles of heroines in his works and challenge their traditional narratives. Medea and Helen are two figures that Euripides significantly redefined in this dynamic, using them to question Athenian masculine ideology and highlight the social issues affecting Athenian women. Euripides addressed a range of social, political, or familial issues that impacted the women of his society, focusing on female sexual desire and the taboos surrounding it, openly criticizing marriage, the intellectual marginalization of women in Greece, and implicitly attacking authors of misogynistic narratives, such as Hesiod. His philosophical and literary advancements credit him with, in a way, creating women as subjects in Greek literature.

These artistic and philosophical stances had led Euripides to be targeted by Aristophanes as a misogynist; by portraying women as capable of wrongdoing, including sexual misconduct, Euripides would be undermining women's interests. This accusation is no longer upheld by modern scholarship, which notes, on the contrary, that Euripides occupies a unique place in Greek tragedy on this subject. However, despite these positions and perspectives, the playwright's writings also remain marked by a sexism and misogyny typical of his time and the circles in which he operated.

== Context ==
=== Greek society as a patriarchal society ===
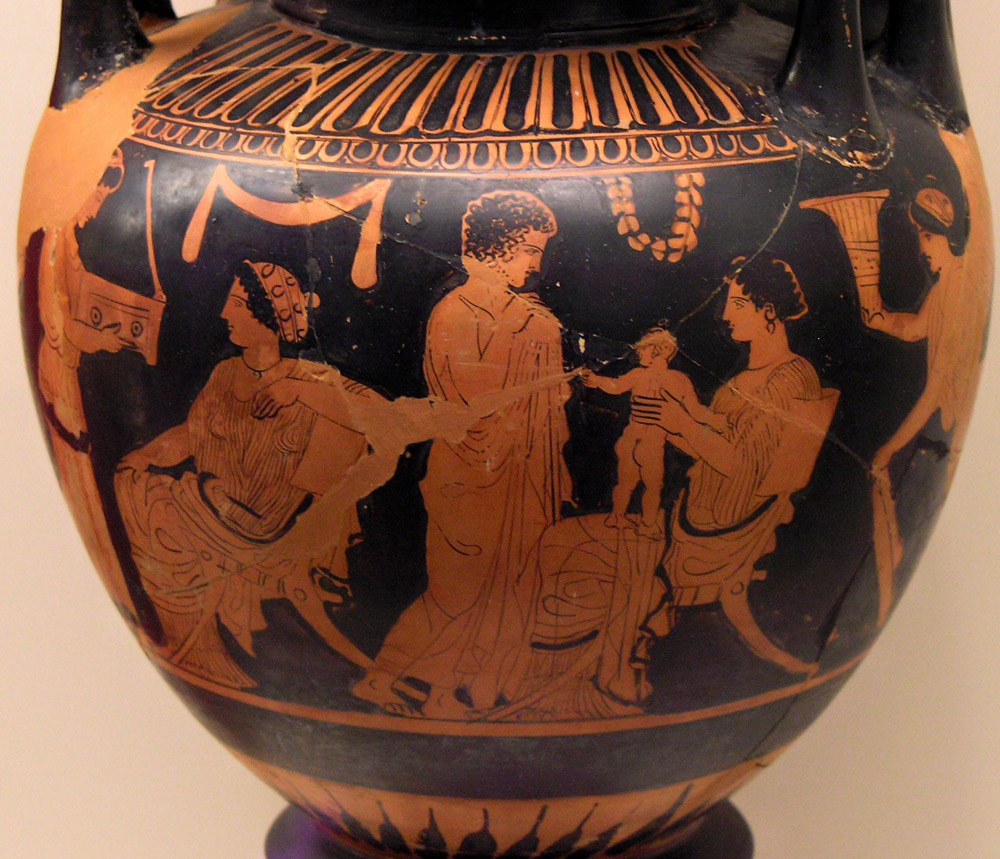
Family scene of the gynaeceum, red-figure wedding vase, c. 430 BC

Classical Athens in the 5th century BC, and more broadly the ancient Greek city-states, were organized around significant phallocentric structures and phenomena that were reinforced during this period. Women faced complete legal discrimination, as they could not be citizens and did not enjoy the civic rights of the city. They were also constantly placed in a position of inferiority compared to their male counterparts. Generally, women were under the authority of the closest male relative, whether it be a father, husband, or son. The cultural and artistic production of Athens during this time was marked by significant sexism and various intellectual processes undertaken to legitimize male privilege. In the 5th century BC, the city was experiencing military, cultural, and artistic expansion; to support its imperial ambitions, a "national" Athenian mythology gradually formed. This ideological framework, which spread throughout Athenian and Greek society, not only supported Athenian imperialism but also contributed to propagating rape culture. These progressive processes were closely linked to the slavery practiced by the city, which expanded significantly during the classical period.

=== Birth of classical theatre ===
Alongside these political and social developments, classical theatre was largely taking shape. Although the practice of tragedy had been attested since the archaic period, the classical era saw its development reach new heights, to the point of nearly creating the genre, according to Jacqueline de Romilly. In the Attic city, the three great Greek tragedians—Aeschylus (c. -525/-456), Sophocles (c. -495/-406), and Euripides (c. -480/-406)—saw their careers intersect and follow one another, each contributing their share of innovations to tragedy, theatre, and art. Theatre, as a public art partially funded by the liturgies of citizens, served as a privileged space for political and social critique. Thus, it appeared as a mirror reflecting the social and political issues of the city and was part of the trajectory of Athenian democracy, which saw it structure and thrive.

=== Particular aspects of Euripides' life and thought ===
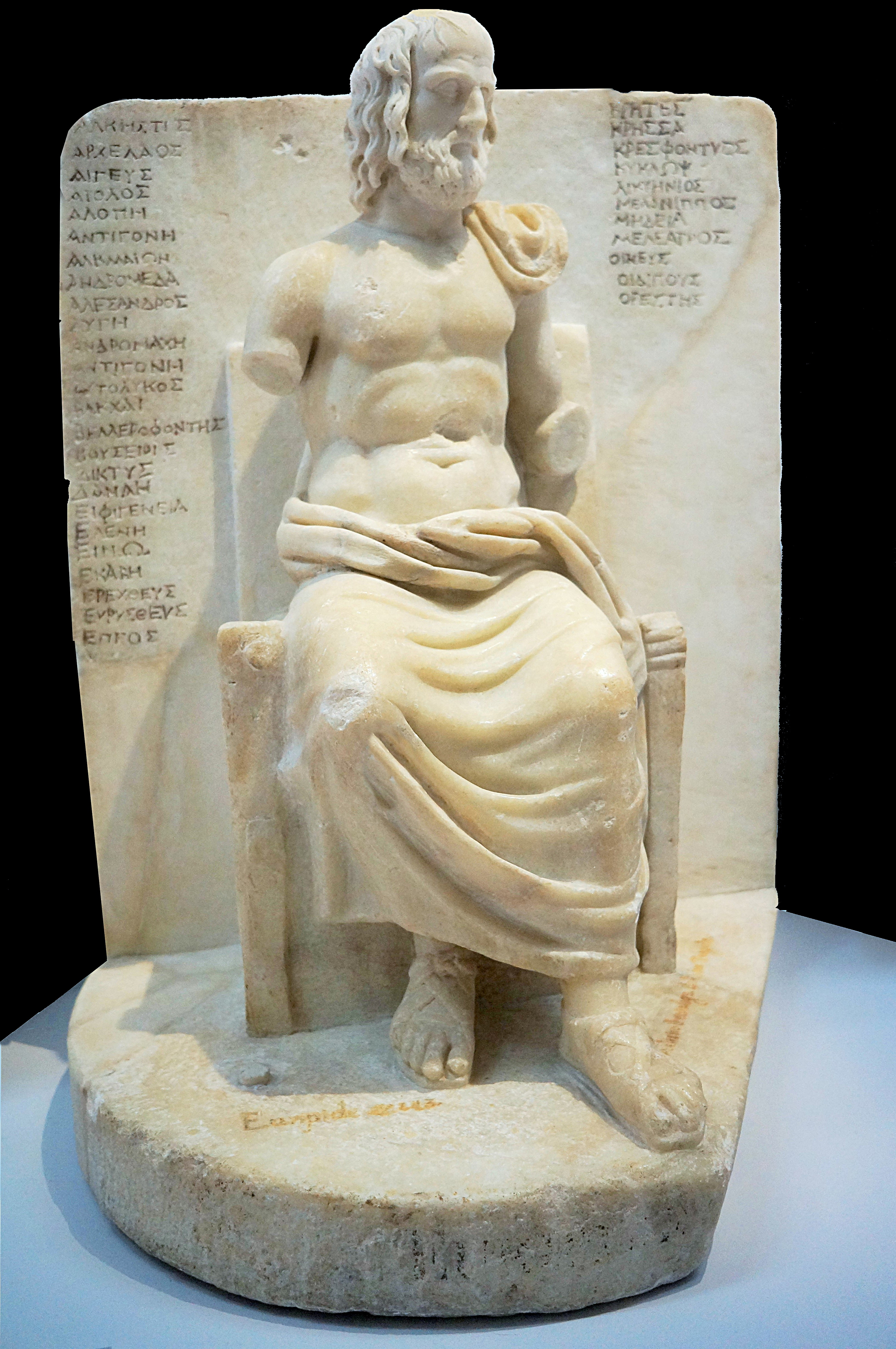
Statuette of Euripides, found in 1704 on the Esquiline Hill, Rome, 2nd Century AD, Louvre-Lens

Euripides, born between 484 and 480 BC, has a biography that is difficult to establish and is touched by numerous legendary elements. He was reportedly disliked by Athenian citizens for his refusal to conform to societal norms and his supposedly inaccessible character, with legendary accounts even suggesting that he took refuge in a cave facing the sea to write undisturbed. In any case, the artist was not heavily involved in civic life, and while it is unlikely that he completely neglected his civic responsibilities, he does not seem to have practiced them extensively. He may have personally known Socrates, although he was older than him, and this remains uncertain; he was also a favored target of Aristophanes.

Euripides is distinguished by a series of philosophical and artistic positions that he seems to profess, as well as by the great attention he places on the concept of freedom, which he articulated in various ways throughout his works. In general, he was interested in the "issues related to the constitutive polarities of Athenian ideology", that is to say, the oppositions between women and men, slaves and free people, foreigners and Greeks, among others. In this regard, the playwright presented slavery, the foundation of Athenian society, as a product of force and therefore fundamentally unjust. For example, in one passage from Hecuba which almost advocates for the complete abolition of slavery, the chorus leader exclaims:

Alas, what an evil slavery has always been;
It endures what is not right, overcome by force.

Furthermore, the playwright was educated in philosophy and rhetoric; he was fully integrated into and a driving force behind the intellectual innovations of the period. Despite being described as unpopular among the Athenian populace, his death was marked by public funerals, which tend to relativize this possibly biased portrayal in ancient sources.

== Women in Euripides ==
Women form a central subject of Euripidean thought and art. Of his nineteen surviving plays, thirteen feature female protagonists (68%) and fourteen female choirs (74%). In comparison, only one out of seven plays (15%) by Aeschylus could potentially have a heroine, and this is uncertain. For Sophocles, two of his seven (29%) surviving plays have female protagonists.

=== General treatment of women and the female condition ===
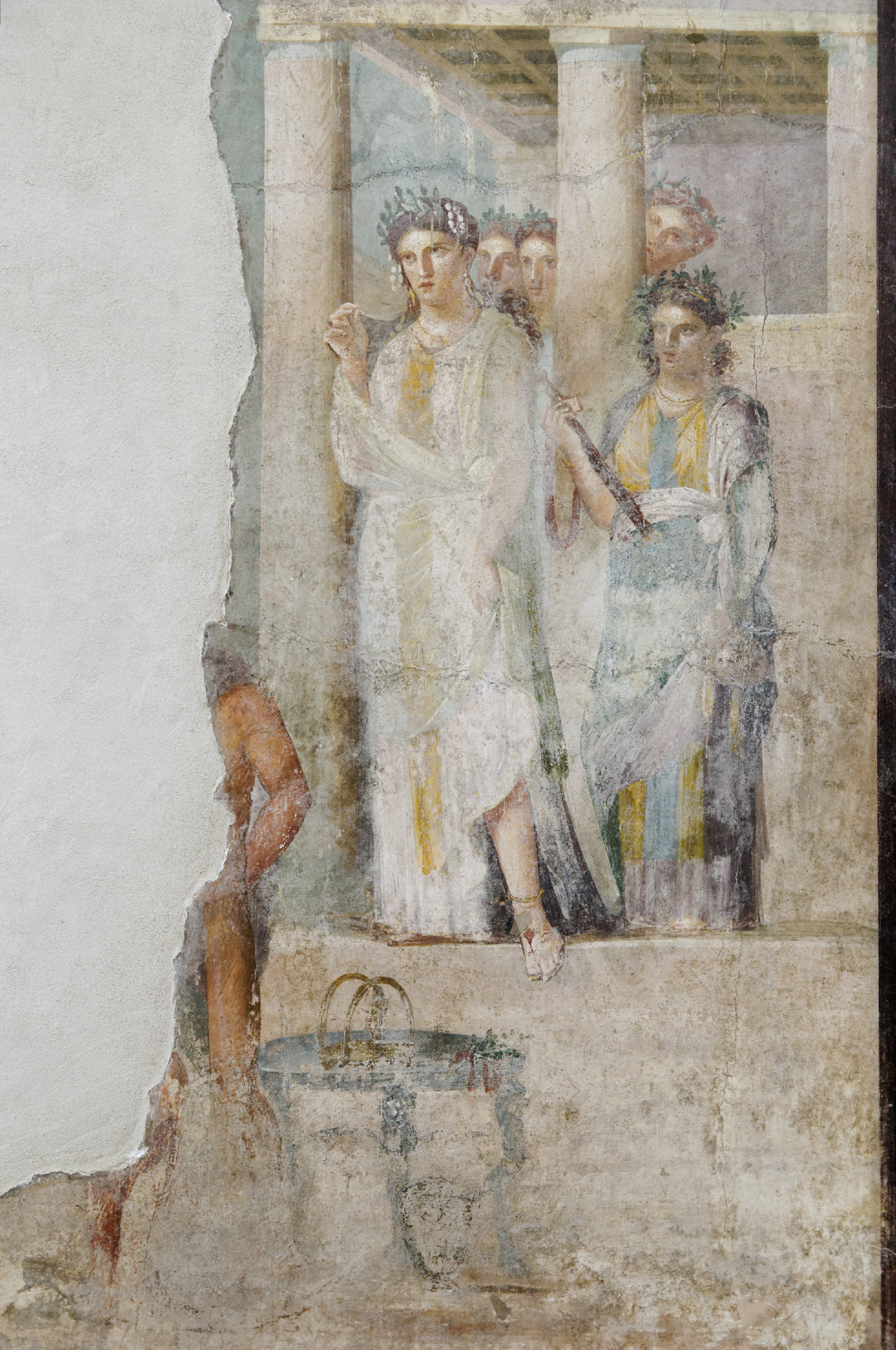
Iphigenia as a priestess of Artemis in Tauris sets out to greet prisoners, amongst which are her brother Orestes and his friend Pylades; Roman fresco from Pompeii, 1st century AD

One of the central aspects of Euripidean art is the effort to place the audience "inside his characters by deep sympathy". The playwright was engaged in a "constant search for truth and realism", which drove him to treat women or marital subjects with interest. In this context, Euripides developed detailed female characters with real personalities. This phenomenon is so prevalent that women make up almost all of his characters who think and philosophize.

Among the figures affected by these innovations are his Medea, Phaedra, and Helen, among others. However, it seems that his interest and perspectives on these subjects evolved, as before producing Medea, the artist was credited with two other tragedies where she would have been portrayed particularly negatively, in line with the traditional Greek view. This humanization sought to make male spectators aware of the issues affecting women within Athenian society. Thus, in his Helen, he used his heroine—the main character of the work—to represent a certain idea of the Athenian woman, aimed at raising the audience's awareness regarding their own domestic situations. Euripides also engaged in creating multiple "servants", giving a voice to women from disadvantaged social classes and introduced a number of his plays through a female character, contributing to the audience's empathy for the heroine.

Continuing in this dynamic, the playwright partially described Athenian domestic life by presenting the domestic world where women were segregated and where female solidarity likely existed, which is reflected in the solidarity of the female characters in his plays. Iphigenia from Iphigenia in Tauris seems to refer to this idea when she responds to the chorus by stating,

We are women, a group well minded toward each other,
and most reliable in saving our common interests.

He ignored the usual controversies in theater against feminist and female political claims of the time and instead preferred to give dignity to his female characters and create situations where the necessity of integrating them was demonstrated. The playwright linked the idea of family to that of the polis. In his writings, he pointed out that just as women are defined by their relationships with their fathers, husbands, and sons, men are defined by their relationships with their mothers, wives, and daughters. He was also very aware of women's psychology, and this is reflected in his works.

Euripides' treatment of women in his plays appears completely isolated and unique within Greek tragedy, although he remained influenced by the usual elements of the cultural and intellectual environments in which he operated.

=== Reversal of myths ===
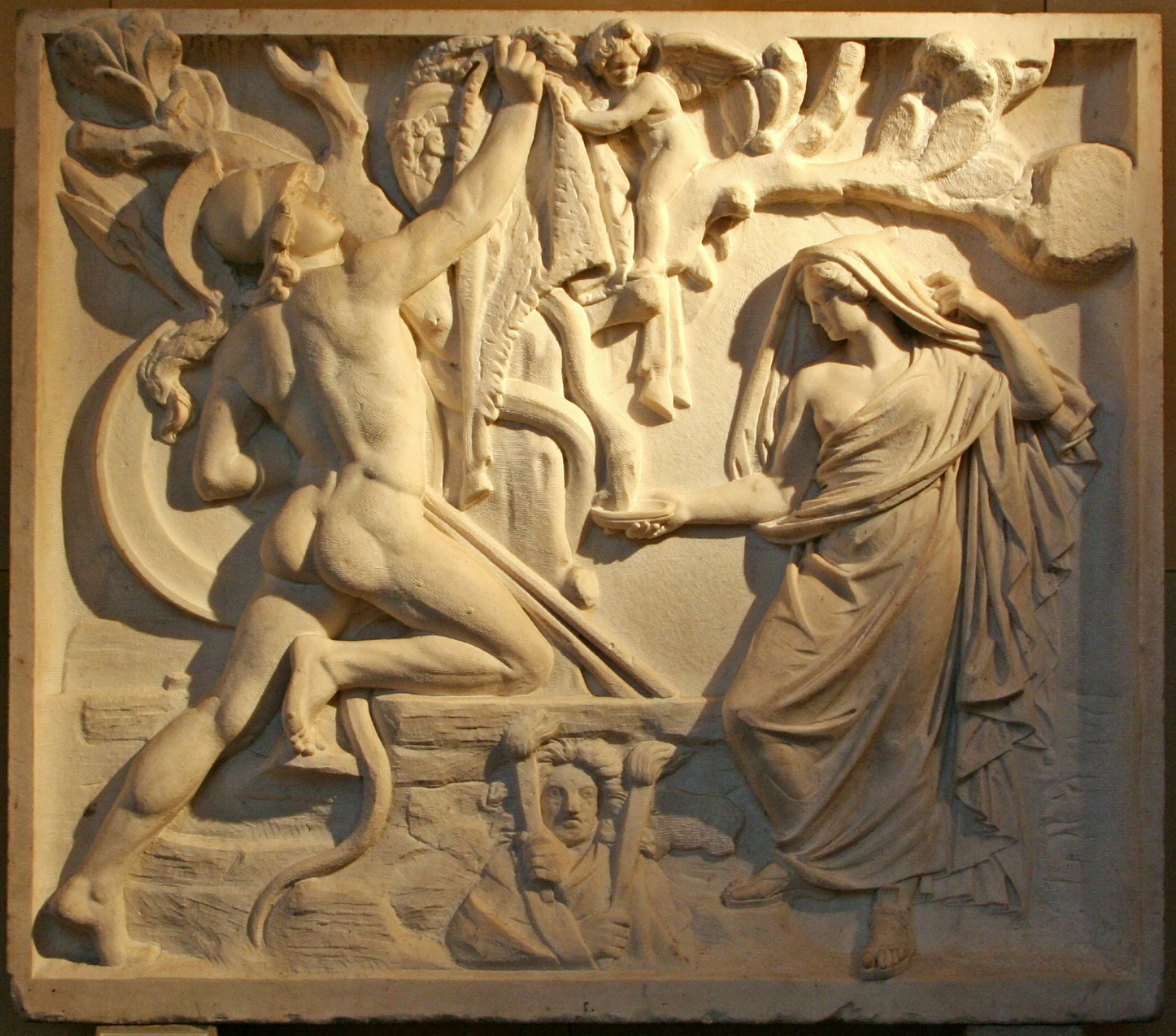
Jason and Medea, bas-relief by Christian Daniel Rauch (1818)

At the same time, Euripides engaged in a vast endeavor to overturn myths. While the children of the Medea-Jason couple died under uncertain circumstances in Greek myths, the playwright seized upon this and made her the perpetrator of their murder. Although such a portrayal may seem particularly pejorative, Medea was actually absolved of the crime, which was an almost logical reaction to the actions of a sexist and adulterous husband, far removed from the heroic Jason of the Golden Fleece. Euripides approached the episode of Medea with a new perspective, seeking to emphasize male lies and deceptions rather than the possibility of Medea committing evil.

Euripides worked to purify as much as possible the mythological elements that presented Medea as a witch, and in doing so, he almost excessively humanized her. She was no longer haloed with magic, although she was very intelligent and capable of creating drugs and poisons. He employed this technique with other women, separating them from witchcraft to portray them simply as intelligent individuals capable of using poisons. For Medea, the absence of any magical power was reinforced by the fact that she found herself abandoned by Jason in a foreign land (Corinth) and isolated, all of which suggested that he did not depict her as a character capable of supernatural actions. Furthermore, Medea was divided between her feminine and masculine traits, until the end of the work, where both dissolved into her "superhumanity" and were transfigured in tragedy—making it particularly complicated to assess the author's intentions and choices.

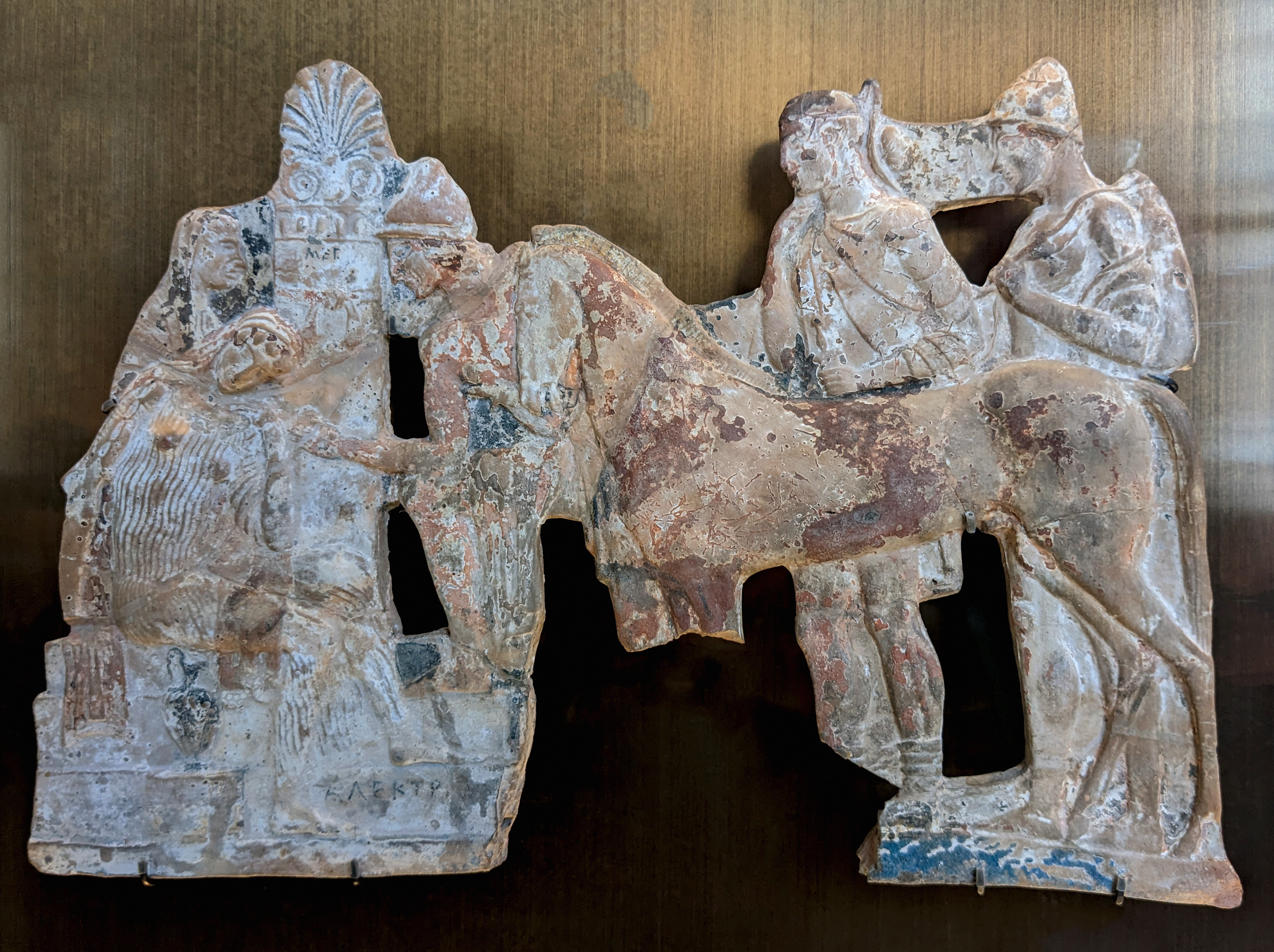
Meeting between Electra and Orestes at the tomb of their father Agamemnon - Louvre, 450-400 BC.

In his Helen, Euripides again broke with the myths: while Helen, the most beautiful woman in the world, chose to follow Paris to Troy, triggering the Trojan War, the "original sin" of Greek mythology, in the playwright's version, the subject was not only refocused on her, who was the heroine of the play; but she was replaced by a "phantom of Helen" during the Trojan War by Hera. This phantom provoked the war, with Menelaus gathering the Achaean army to retrieve this illusion, leading to her mother's suicide, the destruction of Troy, her captivity, her exile, and the loss of her husband. Far from embodying treachery, Euripides created her as a faithful, free woman—not confined to a gynaeceum—refusing to make her the culprit of the war, thus rehabilitating, through her, all women.

Moreover, she openly rejected her beauty several times, preferring maternal modesty. Regarding her beauty and the curse it placed upon her, the Euripidean Helen exclaimed:

My life and fortunes are a monstrosity, partly because of Hera, partly because of my beauty. I wish I had been wiped clean like a painting and made plain instead of beautiful, and that the Greeks had forgotten the evil fate that I now have and remembered what is good, just as they now remember what is ill!

=== Heroic reversal ===
Euripides unfolded a particular conception of heroism, which evolved to "gradually become the domain of women". Thus, Hecuba is shown more heroic than Agamemnon, a representation of masculinity. Helene P. Foley described the absence of dialogue and the heroic reversal that characterized Medea in this way:

For Jason, Medea is a temperamental barbarian concubine (and a typical woman) who must be cast aside for the advantages of a real Greek marriage. Jason mistakenly fails to treat Medea as a hero, to value their mutual oaths and her favors to himself. He cannot hear the heroic language and values she adopts for herself in their first encounter. And so, like Pentheus, he pays for his misunderstanding.

In certain passages of his work, such as in Medea, Euripides employed several literary techniques to reify men, making them passive figures, while he subjectivized women, making them the primary acting forces in the relevant passages.

=== Roles reversal ===
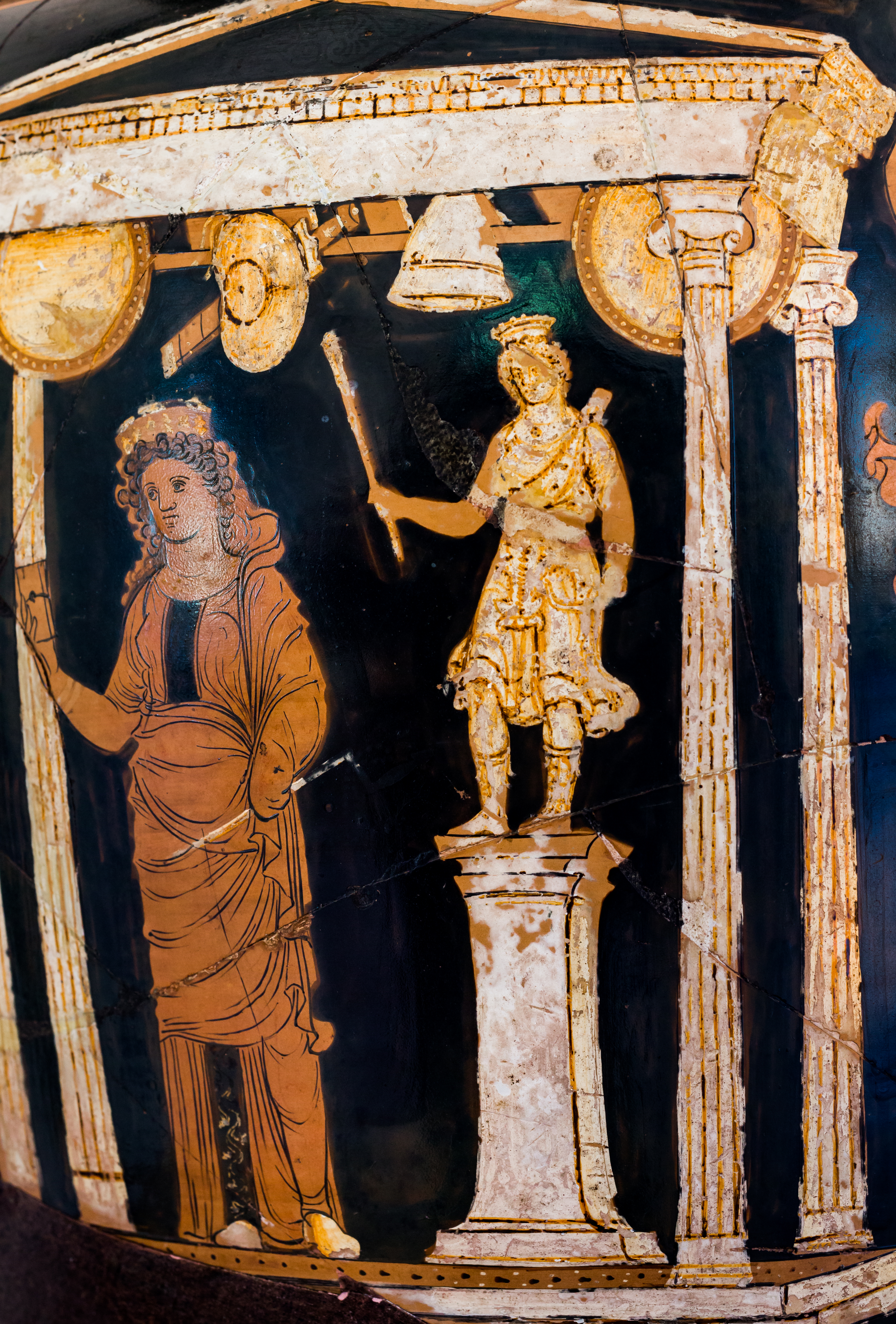
Iphigeneia with the temple key with the statue of Artemis in the temple, Apulian red-figure volute krater, ca. 360-340 BC, Painter of Bari 12061.

In undertaking his reversals, the playwright overturned the roles traditionally assigned to women or men in two different ways. First, he placed a number of heroines—Helen, Clytemnestra, Medea, Alcestis, or Iphigenia—in roles of admirable mothers, wives, or daughters, who adhered to Greek moral criteria, but thus achieved "ironic results". Secondly, the author more prosaically reversed the roles between women and men. Women were often portrayed as morally and physically courageous, intelligent, capable of thinking and executing a plan, little concerned with social norms, or willing to die for their values; men, on the other hand, were more frequently represented as cowardly, impulsive, or gullible. Ruby Blondell supports this view by citing examples such as Menelaus in Helen, who tried to flee at the first difficulty, Admetus, who ignored the importance of Alcestis before she died, or Clytemnestra, who openly told Agamemnon that she would kill him for the murder of Iphigenia, but the king of kings did not believe her or did not understand her.

=== Women and slavery ===
Euripides focused on slavery, particularly female slavery, in several of his plays, such as Andromache, The Trojan Women, or Hecuba. A number of barbarian women were depicted in relation to slavery, especially Trojan women.

The poet also explored the connections between men and female slavery. The men, who were supposed to be the protectors of the women of the city, like the walls, were also, paradoxically, the ones who enslaved women. In these plays, it was actually the men who were presented as an otherness to women, rather than the reverse.

=== Sexuality, taboo, and silence ===
If his Helen is removed from male desire through a reversal of the myth, female sexuality becomes a privileged subject in Euripidean art. First of all, the playwright offered women the opportunity to feel and express their sexual desire, even—perhaps especially—when it conflicted with Greek moral norms. In his now-lost Veiled Hippolytus, the Phaedra he portrayed was "shameless" and fully embraced her incestuous desire for Hippolytus, provoking intense debates within Athenian society about her character. In his Bellerophon, it was Stheneboea who expressed an illicit desire for Bellerophon's guest, drawing criticism from Aristophanes in The Frogs. Among the surviving Euripidean works, The Trojan Women, Andromache, and The Bacchae sporadically address female sexual desire.

Furthermore, Euripides seemed to link sexuality and female desires to the idea of silence. Since it was shameful for them to express these forbidden desires, the playwright focused on describing the expression, or lack thereof, of these desires. Dana Munteanu noted the connections that the playwright established between female sexuality and silence by stating:

Euripidean women often find themselves in a dilemma: to keep silence regarding matters that could imperil their reputation, or to speak to sympathetic females (choruses or other companions), and thus alleviate their pain but perhaps regret their confession [...] Conversely, the silence of Euripidean men does not relate to secrecy, and, in fact, the difference in gender may reflect the social reality of women's isolation and difficulties in expressing their problems.

== Men and gods linked to Euripidean women ==
=== Rhetorical reduction of misogyny ===
When Euripides portrayed his male characters, he sometimes gave them sexist and misogynistic speeches and practices, as seen with Jason and Hippolytus. This misogyny even led to the downfall of certain Euripidean heroes, such as Pentheus in The Bacchae. The playwright crafted extremely misogynistic discourses for them, reducing Athenian cultural misogyny to its simplest form, characterized by visceral reactions and prejudices. Hippolytus expressed this sentiment in one of his speeches:

Be cursed. I could never satisfy my hatred for women, even if I were accused of dwelling on it. It is also because they never cease to do evil. Let there be someone to teach them decency, or let me be allowed to unleash myself against them endlessly.

This reduction of the prevailing misogyny to its most primal expression was likely a deliberate choice by Euripides to critique the hubris of his society and the ideology that suggested an ideal polis could be experienced without the presence of women. The drama no longer targeted merely the hubris of individual characters but that of society as a whole.

=== Maenadism and feminism ===
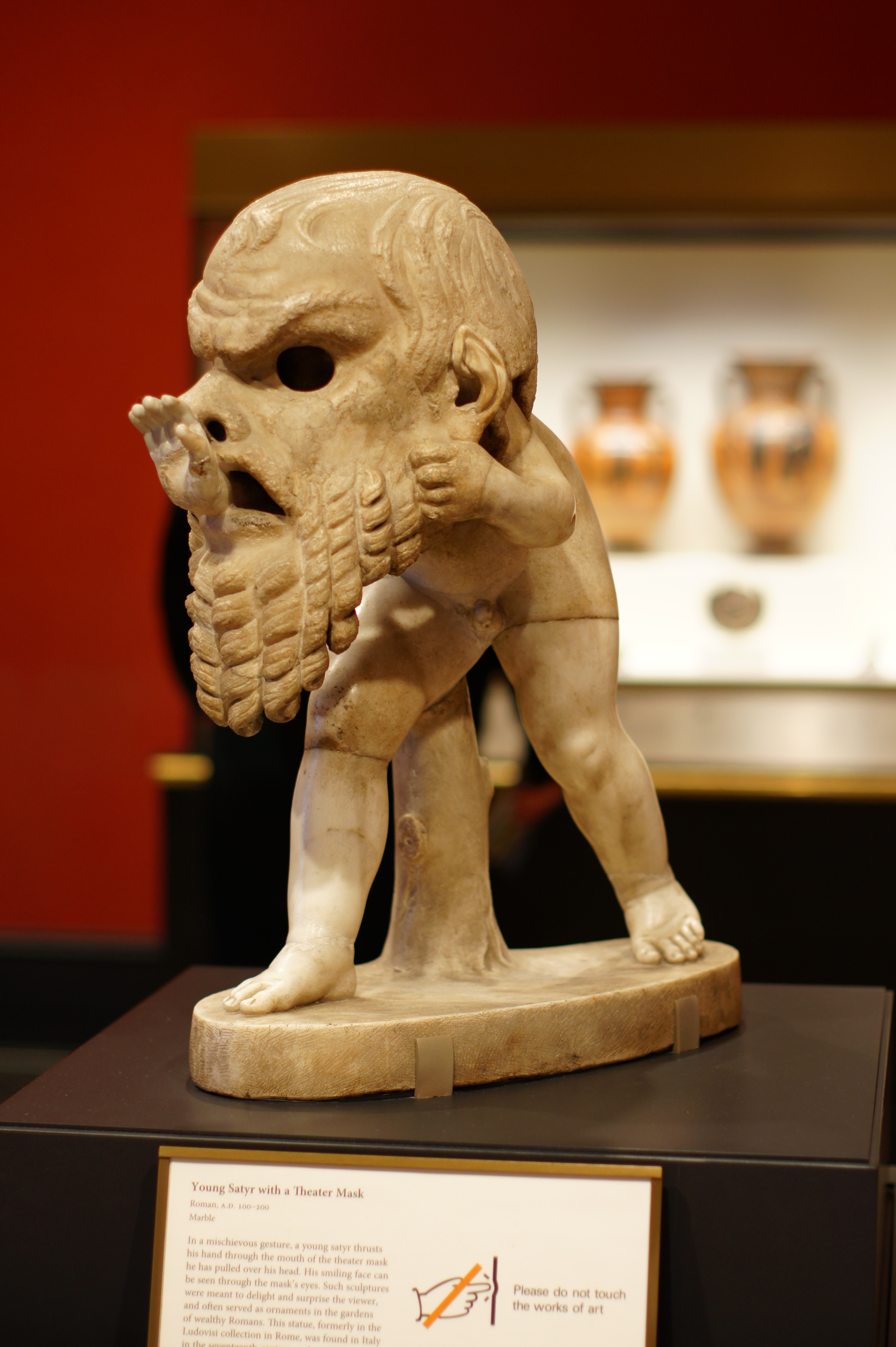
Statue of a young satyr wearing a theater mask of Silenos (AIC, 4.2014), 1-100 CE, Art Institute of Chicago (AIC).

Euripides showed interest in the Maenads, figures significantly linked to the condition of women in the Greek world, through certain male characters. Thus, the Dionysus of The Bacchae is described by psychiatrist and psychoanalyst Helene Deutsch as a "revolutionary feminist", particularly because he liberates women by sending them to live as Maenads in the mountains, a means of emancipating them from patriarchal oppression, according to her. In this play, the last of the playwright, Dionysus first liberates the women before creating his ideal city in nature, on the mountains—a city of poetry and freedom—contrasting with an Athens engaged in the censorship of art.

=== Fatherhood and daughters ===
Contrary to the prevailing opinion expressed in most Greek texts of the period, Euripides valued having daughters. He believed that having a daughter could bring happiness to her father, and that a daughter would therefore not be any more useless than a son to a father. This position is reflected in fragments of Danaë, as well as in The Suppliants, where one can read:

A father who is aging feels the sweetness of having a daughter. Boys have a prouder soul, but they are less tender and less affectionate.

== Open critiques ==
=== Patriarchy and marriage ===
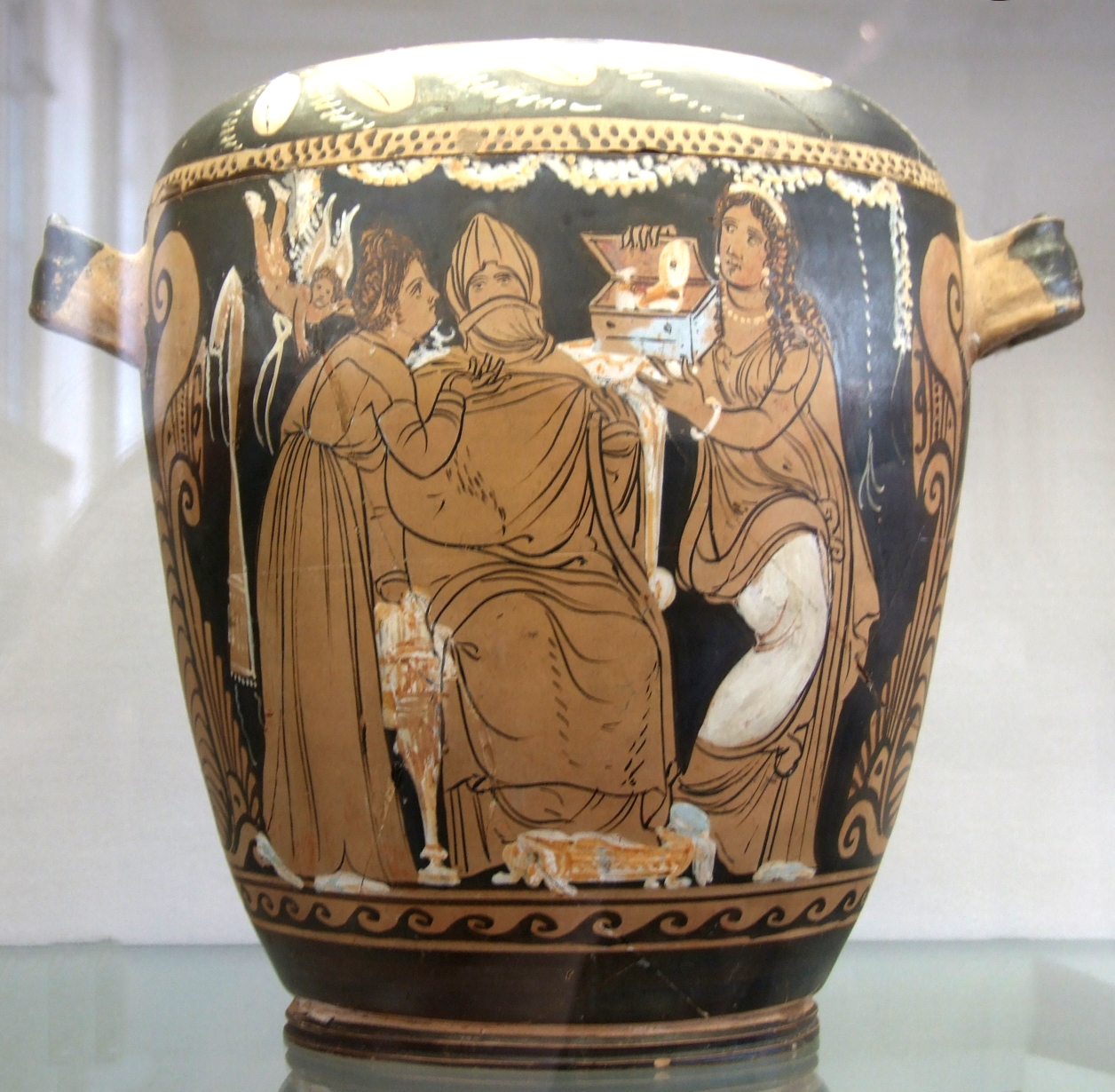
Preparation for a wedding, Sicily, 330-320 BC, Pushkin Museum.

Euripides did not engage exclusively in implicit methods aimed at reevaluating the role of women and politicizing their situation. He also deployed a series of arguments and texts to openly criticize what he perceived as injustice. Thus, the author explicitly critiqued the ideology that suggested women lacked eros, meaning desire, toward wisdom and knowledge. For him, female intelligence was not a danger. In Medea, the chorus openly attacked such a position in a passage that more broadly critiques the intellectual marginalization of women in the Greek world:

Very often already, I have delved into subtle remarks, serious debates, more than is fitting for simple women. We too have our Muse; she speaks to us of wisdom, but not to all, only to one or two that must be sought, most others are foreign to her. Now I say that those who do not know what it is to have children surpass in happiness those who have offspring.

Furthermore, Euripides questioned certain Greek family structures, particularly marriage, which he addressed in part through female experiences. The fact that women were divided between their previous family and their new adoptive family—transitioning from being the possession of their father to that of their husband—is highlighted in several of the playwright's works. This critique of the male privilege that arises from Greek marriage crystallizes in the "feminist" tirade of Medea during the first act of the eponymous play:

Of all beings who breathe and have intelligence, we women are the most miserable creatures, First we have to buy a husband at a steep price, then take a master for our bodies. This second evil is worse than the first, but the greatest contest turns on whether we get a bad husband or a good one. Divorce is not respectable for a woman and she cannot deny her husband. Confronting new customs and rules, she needs to be a prophet, unless she has learned at home how best to manage her bedmate. If we work things out well and the husband lives with us without resisting his yoke, life is enviable. Otherwise it is better to die.
A man when he is tired of being with those inside goes out and relieves his heart of boredom, or turns to some friend or contemporary. But we have to look to one person only. They say we have a life secure from danger living at home, while they wield their spears in battle. They are mistaken! I would rather stand three times beside a shield than give birth once.

This description that the Euripidean Medea provides of her situation also aims to raise public awareness regarding issues affecting women in Athens. She questions other ideas, such as the dowry system, with the poet concluding the tirade with Medea's indignation against the very laws of nature. This episode transforms the attitude of the chorus from rational support to militant support for Medea.

=== Critique of Hesiodic narratives ===
In reality, the chorus of the play supported Medea's speeches and overturns traditional Athenian masculine ideology by criticizing men. This was likely a reaction to the narratives of Hesiod or other poets, such as Simonides of Ceos, regarding women. Although Euripides does not explicitly mention them and refers simply to "ancient bards" and the "male sex/age of man", the chorus clearly aims to challenge the prejudices that targeted women in the myths. In this regard, it declares:

The poetry of ancient bards will cease to hymn our faithlessness. Phoebus lord of song never endowed our minds with the glorious strains of the lyre. Else I could have sounded a hymn in reply to the male sex/age of man. Time in its long expanse can say many things of men's lot as well as of women's.

== Ancient critiques, reviews of his thought and limitations ==
=== Conflict with Aristophanes and misogyny? ===
Aristophanes engaged in extensive polemics targeting Euripides, accusing him of misogyny for portraying women as guilty of crimes and capable of malevolent thoughts. In his critiques directed at Euripides, Aristophanes created female characters who criticized the treatment he believed they received; however, the comedic portrayal rendered them in a very pejorative and sexist light, often incorporating the idea of their innate guilt in these passages. He was also frequently disingenuous in his accusations. When Aristophanes criticized Euripides' incestuous Phaedra as lacking virtue, he either misinterpreted or feigned misunderstanding of his target's intent. Indeed, although Euripides represented her as incestuous, this does not mean she was blameworthy—his Phaedra was, in fact, virtuous, realizing the immoral passion inflicted upon her by Aphrodite and willing to die to uphold her honor against that passion. Jacqueline Assaël noted in this regard that while Euripides spared Phaedra from harsh treatment, he was far less delicate with the "lecherous" tyrant Theoclymenus in Helen. Furthermore, a series of Euripidean female characters are not blameworthy at all. Reflecting on Aristophanes' attacks against Euripides, she stated:

The fate of lost women matters very little, in fact, to Aristophanes. Otherwise, he would not have done himself what he reproaches Euripides for and 'incited to corruption' with the 'risqué' scenes that his plays are not lacking. If the word 'honor' recurs with significant redundancy, it is undoubtedly because his aim is to affirm the rights of a moral order that he does not want to see shaken and to come to the aid of the tranquility of husbands. As a result, comedy imposes a censorship on all literature that declares the simple representation of 'loving women' to be subversive. Until then, Athenian women had probably not imagined they could be so...

The categorization that Aristophanes made of his positions had significant repercussions for the memory of Euripides. According to biographical legends surrounding his death, he was either devoured by dogs or "torn apart" by women.

=== Euripides, feminist? ===
In reality, the fact that Euripides is the only tragic playwright whose ancient sources note and discuss his treatment of women indicates that he is the only one who treated women as such. He is the only tragic figure to grant them a "deliberate treatment" and, in a certain way, nearly created the woman as a subject within Greek literature. Jennifer March, revisiting the question of whether Euripides could truly be considered misogynistic according to the criteria established by Aristophanes, concludes:

Euripides felt, and for any thinking member of his audience he taught, a supreme compassion for the painful precariousness of the human condition; and he taught it most of all through his women characters. In no way can he be called a misogynist.

Assaël, for her part, argues that in Euripides' work, "tragedy arises from a destroyed happiness, from a thwarted passion. Women either experience it or desperately trigger it. And the poet is moved". The figure of Euripides as a feminist was appropriated by suffragettes during their political struggles in the early 20th century. They particularly recited the "feminist" monologue of Medea at some of their meetings and viewed the playwright in a positive light.

=== Limits and discrepancies ===
However, despite the particular perspectives that the playwright chose on a series of points concerning women, the Euripidean works remain marked by significant sexism and misogyny, which continue to color the texts and are quite traditional and commonplace in the society in which Euripides operated. He thus engaged in controversies regarding Sparta; considering that the athletic education given to all women would prevent them from pursuing intellectual studies, even if they wanted to. This athletic education, with the athletic body being perceived as deeply sexual by the Greeks, would explain why the Spartans were seen as more sexually immoral than other Greek women by the playwright.

To illustrate this discrepancy between a feminist Euripides and a Euripides who perpetuates sexist clichés, Munteanu compares a fragment from Melanippe the Captive, a nearly entirely lost play where the playwright writes, "Women are better than men, I will show it", with a quote from Medea where, on the contrary, one finds, "We are women, capable of committing good actions, but even more of bad ones". Georges Raepsaet shares the same analysis of the discrepancy between the feminist Euripides and the misogynistic Euripides and Kjeld Matthiessen states:

However, even in his works, the behavior of female characters is strongly determined by the rules that applied to the female gender in Athens. Women are bound to the home, from which they only emerge on certain occasions and into which they often quickly retreat. They are reluctant to speak in public and expect criticism when they express their opinions. Their thoughts usually revolve around the home and its inhabitants, especially the husband and children. [...] When they are abandoned by their lovers, they have no choice, given the norms of society, but to decide on the abandonment of their children. [...] In all these cases, however, the cause of this dreadful act should not be sought in the young mother, but in the societal constraints and ultimately in the deity that has ruthlessly intervened in their lives. We do not know how the other two tragedians portrayed such situations. For Euripides, however, it is characteristic that he presents this conflict from the perspective of the young woman and mother.

== Bibliography ==
=== Primary sources ===
- Euripides (1962). Euripide, Théâtre complet (in French). Translated by Delcourt, Marie. Paris: Bibliothèque de la Pléiade. ISBN 9782070105663.

=== Secondary sources ===
- Assaël, Jacqueline (1985), "Misogynie et féminisme chez Aristophane et chez Euripide", Pallas. Revue d'études antiques, no. 32, pp. 91–103
- Blondell, Ruby (1999). Women on the Edge : Four Plays by Euripides. New York: Routledge. ISBN 0-203-90669-1.
- Charlier, Marie-Thérèse (1971), "Étude d'un comportement social : les relations entre parents et enfants dans la société athénienne à l'époque classique", L'Antiquité Classique, vol. 40, no. 2, pp. 589–606
- Croally, Neil T. (2008). Euripidean Polemic: The Trojan Women and the Function of Tragedy. Cambridge: Cambridge University Press (CUP). ISBN 978-0521041126.
- Chrysikou, Stella (2018), "Femmes en état de guerre : nature et condition des esclaves troyennes dans l'Hécube d'Euripide" [Women in a state of war: nature and condition of Trojan slaves in Euripides' Hecuba], Bulletin de l'Association Guillaume Budé, no. 2, Paris
- Coontz, Stephanie (1986). Women's Work, Men's Property : The Origins of Gender and Class. London: Penguin Random House. ISBN 978-0-8052-7254-3.
- Daitz, Stephen G. (1971), "Concepts of Freedom and Slavery in Euripides' Hecuba", Hermes, 99 (2): 217–226, JSTOR 4475681
- Foley, Helene P. (2001). Female Acts in Greek Tragedy. Princeton: Princeton University Press. ISBN 9780691094922.
- Henrichs, Albert (1982). "Changing Dionysiac Identities". Jewish and Christian Self-Definition. Volume Three: Self-Definition in the Graeco-Roman World. London: SCM Press. pp. 137–160. ISBN 978-0334008224.
- Hinkelman, Sarah Ann (2014). Euripides' Women. Athens, Ohio: Ohio University (thesis).
- Kavouras, Pavlos (1988), "The Medea of Euripides : An Anthropological perspective", Dialectical Anthropology, 13 (2): 123–141, doi:10.1007/BF00704326, JSTOR 29790268
- Keuls, Eva C. (1993). The Reign of the Phallus: Sexual Politics in Ancient Athens. Berkeley: University Of California Press. ISBN 978-0-06-015300-7.
- March, Jennifer (1990). Euripides the Misogynist ? (PDF). London: Routledge. ISBN 978-0-203-40235-1.
- Matthiessen, Kjeld (2004). Euripides und sein Jahrhundert [Euripides in his century]. Munich: C.H. Beck. ISBN 978-3406517440.
- Munteanu, Dana LaCourse (2020). "Women's Voices in Euripides". Brill's Companion to Euripides. Netherlands: Brill. pp. 889–910. ISBN 978-90-04-26970-5.
- Nancy, Claire (1984), "Euripide et le parti des femmes", Quaderni Urbinati di Cultura Classica, 17 (2): 111–136, doi:10.2307/20538831, JSTOR 20538831
- Raepsaet, Georges (1981), "Sentiments conjugaux à Athènes aux Ve et IVe siècles avant notre ère", L'Antiquité Classique, vol. 50, no. 1–2, pp. 677–684
- de Romilly, Jacqueline (2018). Réflexions sur la tragédie grecque. Paris: Editions de Fallois. ISBN 978-1-000-51338-7.
- Seaford, Richard (1990). "The Structural Problems of Marriage in Euripides". Euripides, Women and Sexuality. Routledge. pp. 300–322. ISBN 978-0-203-40235-1.
- Tyrrell, William Blake (2020). "Life of Euripides". Brill's Companion to Euripides. Netherlands: Brill. pp. 11–27. ISBN 978-90-04-26970-5.
