= Euripides =

5th-century BC Athenian playwright

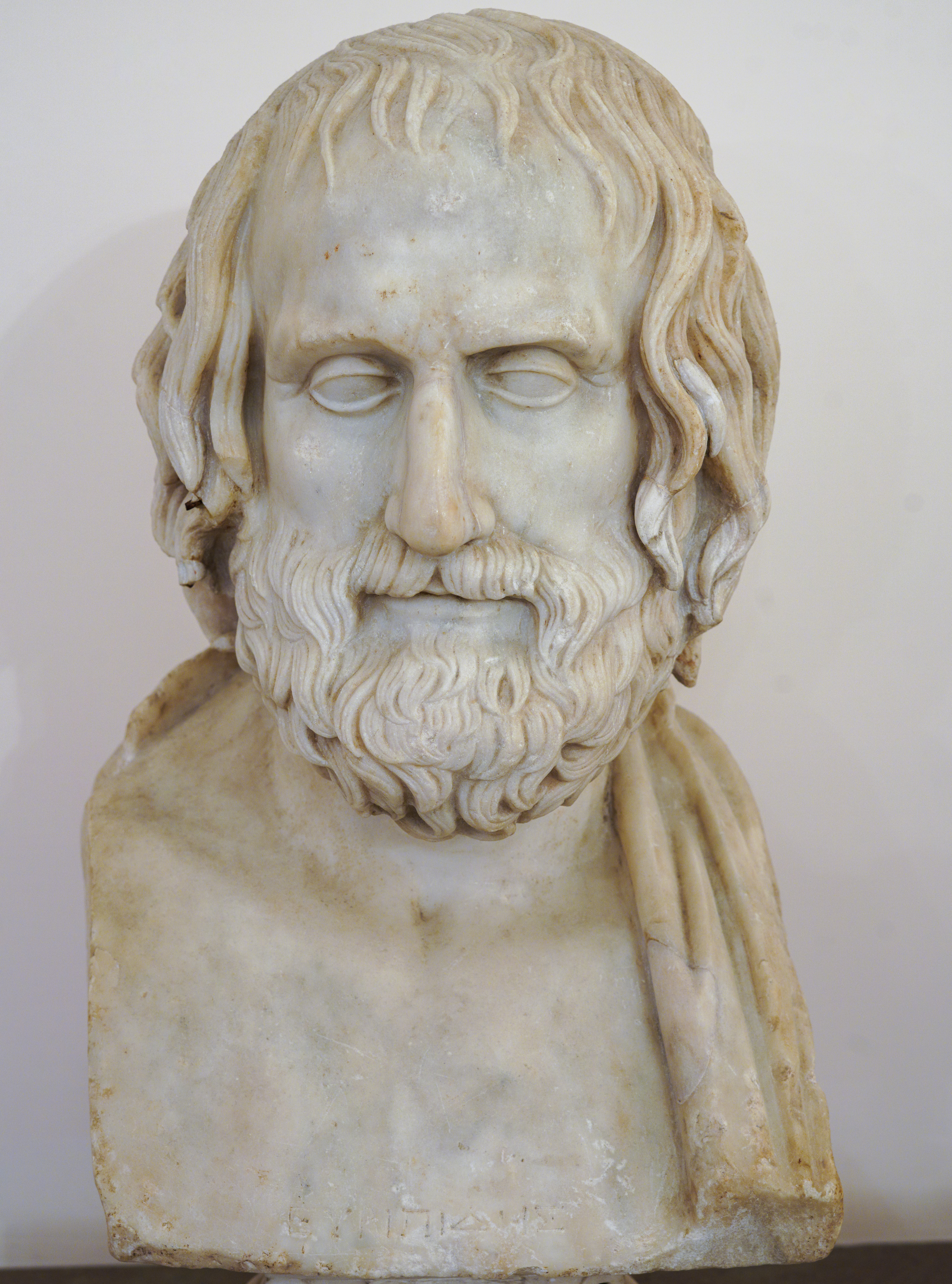
- Bust of Euripides
- Born: c. 480 BC; Salamis
- Died: c. 406 BC (aged approximately 74); Macedon
- Occupation: Playwright
- Notable work: Medea, 431 BC; Hippolytus, 428 BC; Electra, c. 420 BC; The Trojan Women, c. 415 BC; Bacchae, 405 BC
- Spouses: Melite; Choerine
- Parent(s): Mnesarchus; Cleito

Euripides (/jʊəˈrɪpɪdiːz/; Ancient Greek: Eὐριπίδης, romanized: Eurīpídēs, pronounced [eu̯.riː.pí.dɛːs]; c. 480 – c. 406 BC) was a Greek tragedian of classical Athens. Along with Aeschylus and Sophocles, he is one of the three authors of Greek tragedy whose name is ascribed to surviving plays. Some ancient scholars attributed ninety-five plays to him, but the Suda says it was ninety-two at most. Nineteen plays attributed to Euripides have survived more or less complete, although one of these (Rhesus) is often considered not to be genuinely his work. Many fragments (some of them substantial) survive from most of his other plays. More of his plays have survived intact than those of Aeschylus and Sophocles together, partly because his popularity grew as theirs declined: he became, in the Hellenistic Age, a cornerstone of ancient literary education, along with Homer, Demosthenes, and Menander.

Euripides is identified with theatrical innovations that have profoundly influenced drama down to modern times, especially in the representation of traditional, mythical heroes as ordinary people in extraordinary circumstances. This new approach led him to pioneer developments that later writers adapted to comedy, some of which are characteristic of romance. He was referred to by Aristotle as "the most tragic of poets", probably in reference to a perceived preference for unhappy endings, but Aristotle's remark is seen by Bernard Knox as having wider relevance, since "in his representation of human suffering Euripides pushes to the limits of what an audience can stand; some of his scenes are almost unbearable." Focusing on the inner lives and motives of his characters in a way previously unknown, Euripides was "the creator of ... that cage which is the theatre of Shakespeare’s Othello, Racine’s Phèdre, of Ibsen and Strindberg," in which "imprisoned men and women destroy each other by the intensity of their loves and hates". But he was also the literary ancestor of comic dramatists as diverse as Menander and George Bernard Shaw.

In the comedies of his contemporary Aristophanes, Euripides is lampooned for his intellectualism. Modern scholars have varied greatly in their views of Euripides, with some regarding him as an iconoclastic intellectual, and others seeing him as a more traditional playwright. Euripides's portrayal of women has attracted particular interest in modern times, on account of the perceptiveness and sympathy with which Euripides depicts women and the difficulties facing them in Greek society, especially in his Medea.

== Life ==
Traditional accounts of the author's life are found in many commentaries, and include details such as these: He was born on Salamis Island around 480 BC, with parents Cleito (mother) and Mnesarchus (father), a retailer from the deme of Phlya. On receiving an oracle that his son was fated to win "crowns of victory", Mnesarchus insisted that the boy should train for a career in athletics. But the boy was destined for a career on the stage (where he was to win only five victories, one of these posthumously). He served for a short time as both dancer and torch-bearer at the rites of Apollo Zosterius. His education was not confined to athletics, studying also painting and philosophy under the masters Prodicus and Anaxagoras. He had two disastrous marriages, and both his wives—Melite and Choerine (the latter bearing him three sons)—were unfaithful. He became a recluse, making a home for himself in a cave on Salamis (the Cave of Euripides, where a cult of the playwright developed after his death). "There he built an impressive library and pursued daily communion with the sea and sky". The details of his death are uncertain. It was traditionally held that he retired to the "rustic court" of King Archelaus in Macedonia, where he died in 406 BC. Some modern scholars however claim that in reality Euripides may have never visited Macedonia at all, or if he did, he might have been drawn there by King Archelaus with incentives that were also offered to other artists.

Such biographical details derive almost entirely from three unreliable sources:

- folklore, employed by the ancients to lend colour to the lives of celebrated authors;
- parody, employed by the comic poets to ridicule the tragic poets; and
- 'autobiographical' clues gleaned from his extant plays (a mere fraction of his total output).

The next three sections expand on the claims of each of these sources, respectively.

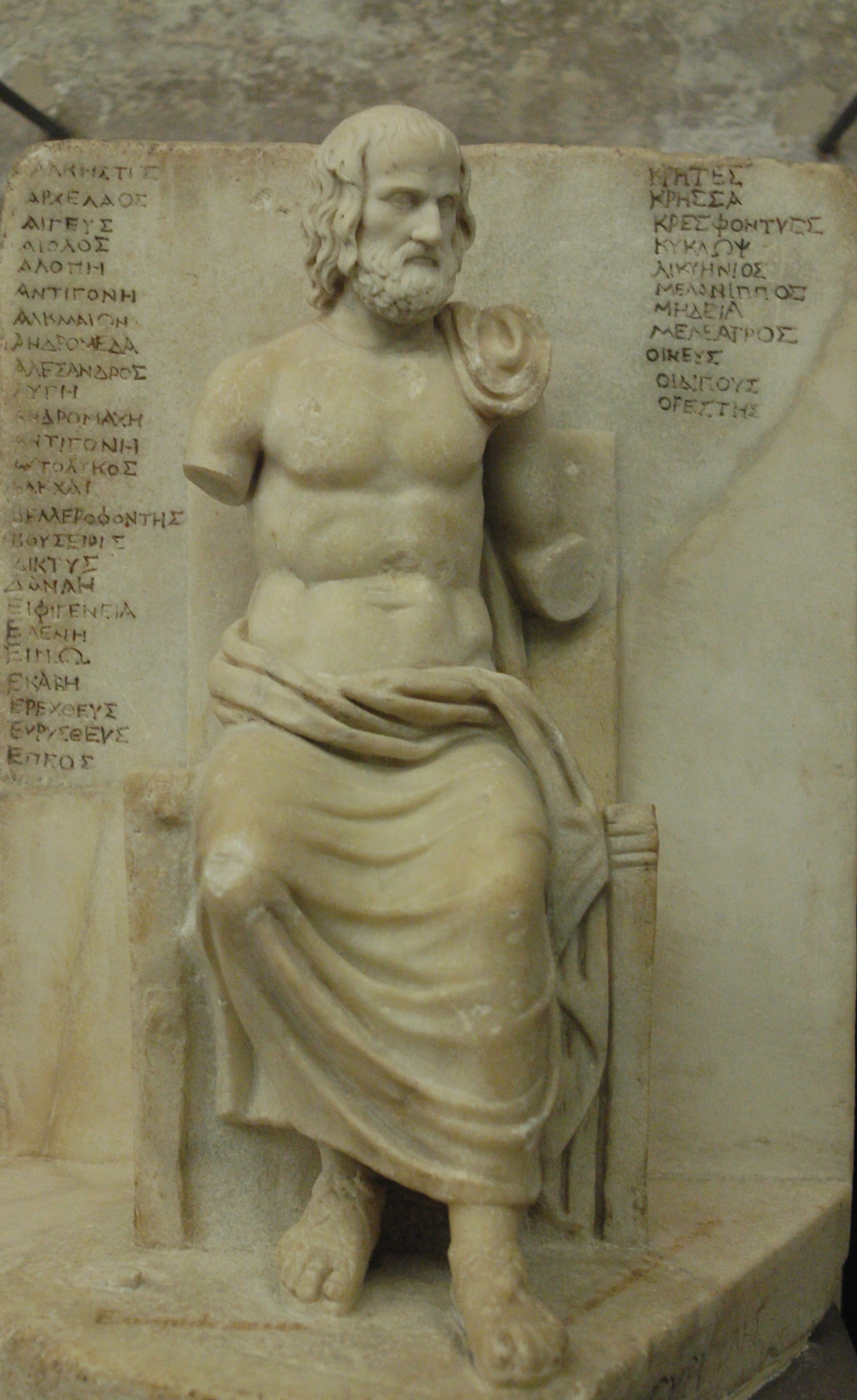
2nd century AD statue of Euripides, Louvre, Paris

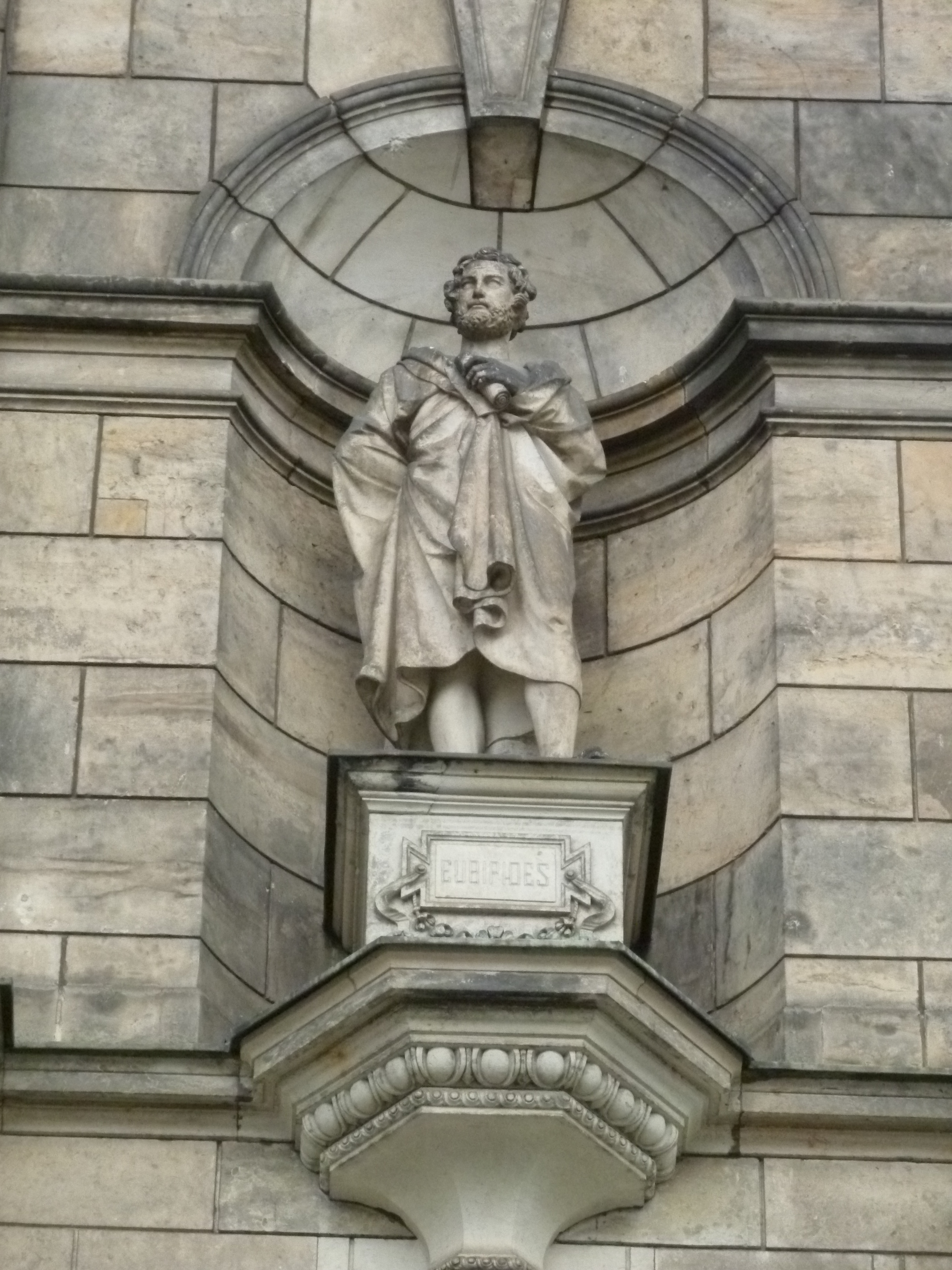
19th century statue of Euripides in a niche on the Semperoper, Germany

=== A fabled life ===
Euripides was the youngest in a group of three great tragedians, who were almost contemporaries: his first play was staged thirteen years after Sophocles's debut, and three years after Aeschylus's Oresteia. The identity of the trio is neatly underscored by a patriotic account of their roles during Greece's great victory over Persia at the Battle of Salamis: Aeschylus fought there, Sophocles was just old enough to celebrate the victory in a boys' chorus, and Euripides was born on the very day of the battle. The apocryphal account that he composed his works in a cave on Salamis island was a late tradition, probably symbolizing the isolation of an intellectual ahead of his time. Much of his life, and his whole career, coincided with the struggle between Athens and Sparta for hegemony in Greece, but he did not live to see the final defeat of his city. It is said that he died in Macedonia after being attacked by the Molossian hounds of King Archelaus, and that his cenotaph near Piraeus was struck by lightning—signs of his unique powers, whether for good or ill (according to one modern scholar, his death might have been caused instead by the harsh Macedonian winter). In an account by Plutarch, the catastrophic failure of the Sicilian expedition led Athenians to trade renditions of Euripides's lyrics to their enemies in return for food and drink (Life of Nicias 29). Plutarch also provides the story that the victorious Spartan generals, having planned the demolition of Athens and the enslavement of its people, grew merciful after being entertained at a banquet by lyrics from Euripides's play Electra: "they felt that it would be a barbarous act to annihilate a city which produced such men" (Life of Lysander).

=== A comic life ===
Tragic poets were often mocked by comic poets during the dramatic festivals Dionysia and Lenaia, and Euripides was travestied more than most. Aristophanes scripted him as a character in at least three plays: The Acharnians, Thesmophoriazusae and The Frogs. But Aristophanes also borrowed, rather than merely satirized, some of the tragedian's methods; he was himself ridiculed by Cratinus, another comic poet, as:

ὑπολεπτολόγος, γνωμιδιώτης,
εὐριπιδαριστοφανίζων

— Cratinus F 342
Translation:

a quibbler of words, a maker of maxims,
a Euripidaristophaniser

— Storey

According to another comic poet, Teleclides, the plays of Euripides were co-authored by the philosopher Socrates:

Μνησίλοχός ἐστ᾿ ἐκεῖνος, <ὃς> φρύγει τι δρᾶμα καινόν
Εὐριπίδῃ, καὶ Σωκράτης τὰ φρύγαν᾿ ὑποτίθησιν.
[...] Εὐριπίδης σωκρατογόμφους.

— Teleclides, F41-42
Translation:

Mnesilochus is the man <who> is roasting a new play for
Euripides, and Socrates is laying down the kindling.
[...] Euripides bolted together with Socrates

— Storey

Aristophanes alleged that the co-author was a celebrated actor, Cephisophon, who also shared the tragedian's house and his wife, while Socrates taught an entire school of quibblers like Euripides:

χαρίεν οὖν μὴ Σωκράτει
παρακαθήμενον λαλεῖν
ἀποβαλόντα μουσικὴν
τά τε μέγιστα παραλιπόντα
τῆς τραγῳδικῆς τέχνης.
τὸ δ᾿ ἐπὶ σεμνοῖσιν λόγοισι
καὶ σκαριφησμοῖσι λήρων
διατριβὴν ἀργὸν ποιεῖσθαι,
παραφρονοῦντος ἀνδρός

— Aristophanes, Frogs [1490–99]
Translation:

So what's stylish is not to sit
beside Socrates and chatter,
casting the arts aside
and ignoring the best
of the tragedian’s craft.
To hang around killing time
in pretentious conversation
and hairsplitting twaddle
is the mark of a man who's lost his mind

— Henderson

In The Frogs, written when Euripides and Aeschylus were dead, Aristophanes has the god Dionysus venturing down to Hades in search of a good poet to bring back to Athens. After a debate between the shades of Aeschylus and Euripides, the god brings Aeschylus back to life, as more useful to Athens, for his wisdom, rejecting Euripides as merely clever. Such comic 'evidence' suggests that Athenians admired Euripides even while they mistrusted his intellectualism, at least during the long war with Sparta. Aeschylus had written his own epitaph commemorating his life as a warrior fighting for Athens against Persia, without any mention of his success as a playwright; and Sophocles was celebrated by his contemporaries for his social gifts, and contributions to public life as a state official; but there are no records of Euripides's public life except as a dramatist—he could well have been "a brooding and bookish recluse". He is presented as such in The Acharnians, where Aristophanes shows him to be living morosely in a precarious house, surrounded by the tattered costumes of his disreputable characters (and yet Agathon, another tragic poet, is discovered in a later play, Thesmophoriazusae, to be living in circumstances almost as bizarre). Euripides's mother was a humble vendor of vegetables, according to the comic tradition, yet his plays indicate that he had a liberal education and hence a privileged background.

=== A tragedian's life ===
Euripides first competed in the City Dionysia, the famous Athenian dramatic festival, in 455 BC, one year after the death of Aeschylus; and did not win first prize until 441 BC. His final competition in Athens was in 408 BC. The Bacchae and Iphigenia in Aulis were performed in 405 BC, and first prize was awarded posthumously. He won first prize only five times.

His plays, and those of Aeschylus and Sophocles, indicate a difference in outlook between the three—a generation gap probably due to the Sophistic enlightenment in the middle decades of the 5th century: Aeschylus still looked back to the archaic period, Sophocles was in transition between periods, and Euripides was fully imbued with the new spirit of the classical age. When Euripides's plays are sequenced in time, they also reveal that his outlook might have changed, providing a "spiritual biography", along these lines:

- an early period of high tragedy (Medea, Hippolytus)
- a patriotic period at the outset of the Peloponnesian War (Children of Heracles, The Suppliants)
- a middle period of disillusionment at the senselessness of war (Hecuba, The Trojan Women)
- an escapist period with a focus on romantic intrigue (Ion, Iphigenia in Tauris, Helen)
- a final period of tragic despair (Orestes, Phoenician Women, The Bacchae)

However, about 80% of his plays have been lost, and even the extant plays do not present a fully consistent picture of his 'spiritual' development (for example, Iphigenia in Aulis is dated with the 'despairing' Bacchae, yet it contains elements that became typical of New Comedy). In the Bacchae, he restores the chorus and messenger speech to their traditional role in the tragic plot, and the play appears to be the culmination of a regressive or archaizing tendency in his later works (for which see Chronology below). Believed to have been composed in the wilds of Macedonia, Bacchae also dramatizes a primitive side to Greek religion, and some modern scholars have interpreted this particular play biographically, therefore, as:

- a kind of death-bed conversion or renunciation of atheism;
- the poet's attempt to ward off the charge of impiety that was later to overtake his friend Socrates;
- evidence of a new belief that religion cannot be analysed rationally.

One of his earliest extant plays, Medea, includes a speech that he seems to have written in defence of himself as an intellectual ahead of his time (spoken by Medea):

σκαιοῖσι μὲν γὰρ καινὰ προσφέρων σοφὰ
δόξεις ἀχρεῖος κοὐ σοφὸς πεφυκέναι·
τῶν δ᾿ αὖ δοκούντων εἰδέναι τι ποικίλον
κρείσσων νομισθεὶς ἐν πόλει λυπρὸς φανῇ.
ἐγὼ δὲ καὐτὴ τῆσδε κοινωνῶ τύχης [298–302].
If you bring novel wisdom to fools, you will be regarded as useless, not wise; and if the city regards you as greater than those with a reputation for cleverness, you will be thought vexatious. I myself am a sharer in this lot.

== Work ==
Athenian tragedy in performance during Euripides's lifetime was a public contest between playwrights. The state funded it and awarded prizes. The language was metrical, spoken and sung. The performance area included a circular floor (called orchestra) where the chorus could dance, a space for actors (three speaking actors in Euripides's time), a backdrop or skene, and some special effects: an ekkyklema (used to bring the skene's "indoors" outdoors) and a mechane (used to lift actors in the air, as in deus ex machina). With the introduction of the third actor (attributed to Aeschylus by Themistius; to Sophocles by Aristotle), acting also began to be regarded as a skill worth prizes, requiring a long apprenticeship in the chorus. Euripides and other playwrights accordingly composed more and more arias for accomplished actors to sing, and this tendency became more marked in his later plays: tragedy was a "living and ever-changing genre" (cf. previous section, and Chronology; a list of his plays is below).

Euripides was distinguished by a series of philosophical and artistic positions that he seems to profess, as well as by the great attention he placed on the concept of freedom, which he articulated in various ways throughout his works. In general, he was interested in the "issues related to the constitutive polarities of Athenian ideology", that is to say, the oppositions between women and men, slaves and free people, foreigners and Greeks, among others. In this regard, the playwright presented slavery, the foundation of Athenian society, as a product of force and therefore fundamentally unjust. He also sought to place the audience "inside his characters by deep sympathy". The playwright was engaged in a "constant search for truth and realism", which drove him to treat women or marital subjects with interest. In this context, Euripides developed detailed female characters with real personalities. This phenomenon is so prevalent that women make up almost all of his characters who think and philosophize.

The comic poet Aristophanes is the earliest known critic to characterize Euripides as a spokesman for destructive, new ideas associated with declining standards in both society and tragedy (see Reception for more). But fifth-century tragedy was a social gathering for "carrying out quite publicly the maintenance and development of mental infrastructure", and it offered spectators a "platform for an utterly unique form of institutionalized discussion". The dramatist's role was not only to entertain but also educate fellow citizens—he was expected to have a message. Traditional myth provided the subject matter, but the dramatist was meant to be innovative, which led to novel characterizations of heroic figures and use of the mythical past as a tool for discussing present issues. The difference between Euripides and his older colleagues was one of degree: his characters talked about the present more controversially and pointedly than those of Aeschylus and Sophocles, sometimes even challenging the democratic order. Thus, for example, Odysseus is represented in Hecuba (lines 131–32) as "agile-minded, sweet-talking, demos-pleasing", i.e. similar to the war-time demagogues that were active in Athens during the Peloponnesian War. Speakers in the plays of Aeschylus and Sophocles sometimes distinguish between slaves who are servile by nature and those servile by circumstance, but Euripides's speakers go further, positing an individual's mental, rather than social or physical, state as a true indication of worth. For example, in Hippolytus, a love-sick queen rationalizes her position and, reflecting on adultery, arrives at this comment on intrinsic merit:

ἐκ δὲ γενναίων δόμων
τόδ᾿ ἦρξε θηλείαισι γίγνεσθαι κακόν·
ὅταν γὰρ αἰσχρὰ τοῖσιν ἐσθλοῖσιν δοκῇ,
ἦ κάρτα δόξει τοῖς κακοῖς γ᾿ εἶναι καλά.
[...] μόνον δὲ τοῦτό φασ᾿ ἁμιλλᾶσθαι βίῳ,
γνώμην δικαίαν κἀγαθὴν ὅτῳ παρῇ [409–427].
This contagion began for the female sex with the nobility. For when those of noble station resolve on base acts, surely the base-born will regard such acts as good. [...] One thing only, they say, competes in value with life, the possession of a heart blameless and good.

Euripides's characters resembled contemporary Athenians rather than heroic figures of myth.

For achieving his end Euripides' regular strategy is a very simple one: retaining the old stories and the great names, as his theatre required, he imagines his people as contemporaries subjected to contemporary kinds of pressures, and examines their motivations, conduct and fate in the light of contemporary problems, usages and ideals.

— Moses Hadas

As mouthpieces for contemporary issues, they "all seem to have had at least an elementary course in public speaking". The dialogue often contrasts so strongly with the mythical and heroic setting that it can seem like Euripides aimed at parody. For example, in The Trojan Women, the heroine's rationalized prayer elicits comment from Menelaus:

ΕΚΑΒΗ: [...] Ζεύς, εἴτ᾿ ἀνάγκη φύσεος εἴτε νοῦς βροτῶν,
προσηυξάμην σε· πάντα γὰρ δι᾿ ἀψόφου
βαίνων κελεύθου κατὰ δίκην τὰ θνήτ᾿ ἄγεις.
ΜΕΝΕΛΑΟΣ: τί δ᾿ ἔστιν; εὐχὰς ὡς ἐκαίνισας θεῶν [886–889].
Hecuba: [...] Zeus, whether you are the necessity of nature or the mind of mortal men, I address you in prayer! For proceeding on a silent path you direct all mortal affairs toward justice!
Menelaus: What does this mean? How strange your prayer to the gods is!

Athenian citizens were familiar with rhetoric in the assembly and law courts, and some scholars believe that Euripides was more interested in his characters as speakers with cases to argue than as characters with lifelike personalities. They are self-conscious about speaking formally, and their rhetoric is shown to be flawed, as if Euripides were exploring the problematical nature of language and communication: "For speech points in three different directions at once, to the speaker, to the person addressed, to the features in the world it describes, and each of these directions can be felt as skewed". For example, in the quotation above, Hecuba presents herself as a sophisticated intellectual describing a rationalized cosmos, but the speech is ill-suited to her audience, the unsophisticated listener Menelaus, and is found to not suit the cosmos either (her grandson is murdered by the Greeks). In Hippolytus, speeches appear verbose and ungainly, as if to underscore the limitations of language.

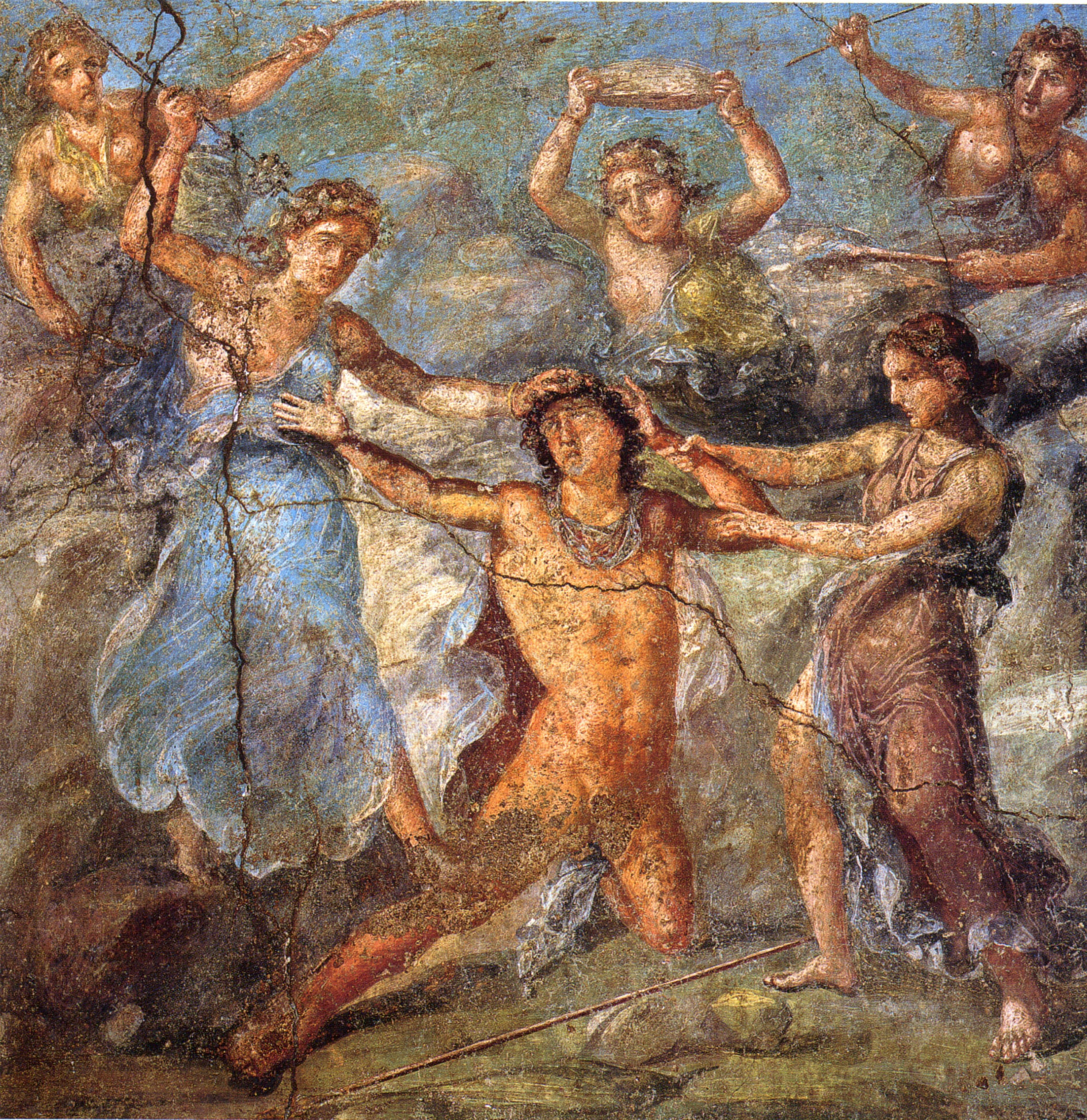
Ancient Roman wall painting from House of the Vettii in Pompeii, showing the death of Pentheus, as portrayed in Euripides's Bacchae

Like Euripides, both Aeschylus and Sophocles created comic effects, contrasting the heroic with the mundane, but they employed minor supporting characters for that purpose. Euripides was more insistent, using major characters as well. His comic touches can be thought to intensify the overall tragic effect, and his realism, which often threatens to make his heroes look ridiculous, marks a world of debased heroism: "The loss of intellectual and moral substance becomes a central tragic statement". Psychological reversals are common and sometimes happen so suddenly that inconsistency in characterization is an issue for many critics, such as Aristotle, who cited Iphigenia in Aulis as an example (Poetics 1454a32). For others, psychological inconsistency is not a stumbling block to good drama: "Euripides is in pursuit of a larger insight: he aims to set forth the two modes, emotional and rational, with which human beings confront their own mortality." Some think unpredictable behaviour realistic in tragedy: "everywhere in Euripides a preoccupation with individual psychology and its irrational aspects is evident....In his hands tragedy for the first time probed the inner recesses of the human soul and let passions spin the plot." The tension between reason and passion is symbolized by his characters' relationship with the gods: For example, Hecuba's prayer is answered not by Zeus, nor by the law of reason, but by Menelaus, as if speaking for the old gods. And the perhaps most famous example is in Bacchae where the god Dionysus savages his own converts. When the gods do appear (in eight of the extant plays), they appear "lifeless and mechanical". Sometimes condemned by critics as an unimaginative way to end a story, the spectacle of a "god" making a judgement or announcement from a theatrical crane might actually have been intended to provoke scepticism about the religious and heroic dimension of his plays. Similarly, his plays often begin in a banal manner that undermines theatrical illusion. Unlike Sophocles, who established the setting and background of his plays in the introductory dialogue, Euripides used a monologue in which a divinity or human character simply tells the audience all it needs to know to understand what follows, and provided 'cues' for the audience reaction to key moments in his plays through the part of the chorus.

Aeschylus and Sophocles were innovative, but Euripides had arrived at a position in the "ever-changing genre" where he could easily move between tragic, comic, romantic, and political effects. This versatility appears in individual plays and also over the course of his career. Potential for comedy lay in his use of 'contemporary' characters, in his sophisticated tone, his relatively informal Greek (see In Greek below), and in his ingenious use of plots centred on motifs that later became standard in Menander's New Comedy (for example the 'recognition scene'). Other tragedians also used recognition scenes, but they were heroic in emphasis, as in Aeschylus's The Libation Bearers, which Euripides parodied in Electra (Euripides was unique among the tragedians in incorporating theatrical criticism in his plays). Traditional myth with its exotic settings, heroic adventures, and epic battles offered potential for romantic melodrama as well as for political comments on a war theme, so that his plays are an extraordinary mix of elements. The Trojan Women, for example, is a powerfully disturbing play on the theme of war's horrors, apparently critical of Athenian imperialism (it was composed in the aftermath of the Melian massacre and during the preparations for the Sicilian Expedition), yet it features the comic exchange between Menelaus and Hecuba quoted above, and the chorus considers Athens, the "blessed land of Theus", to be a desirable refuge—such complexity and ambiguity are typical both of his "patriotic" and "anti-war" plays.

Tragic poets in the fifth century competed against one another at the City Dionysia, each with a tetralogy of three tragedies and a satyr play. The few extant fragments of satyr plays attributed to Aeschylus and Sophocles indicate that these were a loosely structured, simple, and jovial form of entertainment. But in Cyclops (the only complete satyr-play that survives), Euripides structured the entertainment more like a tragedy and introduced a note of critical irony typical of his other work. His genre-bending inventiveness is shown above all in Alcestis, a blend of tragic and satyric elements. This fourth play in his tetralogy for 438 BC (i.e., it occupied the position conventionally reserved for satyr plays) is a "tragedy", featuring Heracles as a satyric hero in conventional satyr-play scenes: an arrival, a banquet, a victory over an ogre (in this case, death), a happy ending, a feast, and a departure for new adventures. Most of the big innovations in tragedy were made by Aeschylus and Sophocles, but "Euripides made innovations on a smaller scale that have impressed some critics as cumulatively leading to a radical change of direction".

Euripides is also known for his use of irony. Many Greek tragedians make use of dramatic irony to bring out the emotion and realism of their characters or plays, but Euripides uses irony to foreshadow events and occasionally amuse his audience. For example, in his play Heracles, Heracles comments that all men love their children and wish to see them grow. The irony here is that Heracles will be driven into madness by Hera and will kill his children. Similarly, in Helen, Theoclymenus remarks how happy he is that his sister has the gift of prophecy and will warn him of any plots or tricks against him (the audience already knows that she has betrayed him). In this instance, Euripides uses irony not only for foreshadowing but also for comic effect—which few tragedians did. Likewise, in the Bacchae, Pentheus's first threat to the god Dionysus is that if Pentheus catches him in his city, he will 'chop off his head', whereas it is Pentheus who is beheaded at the end of the play.

=== Language ===
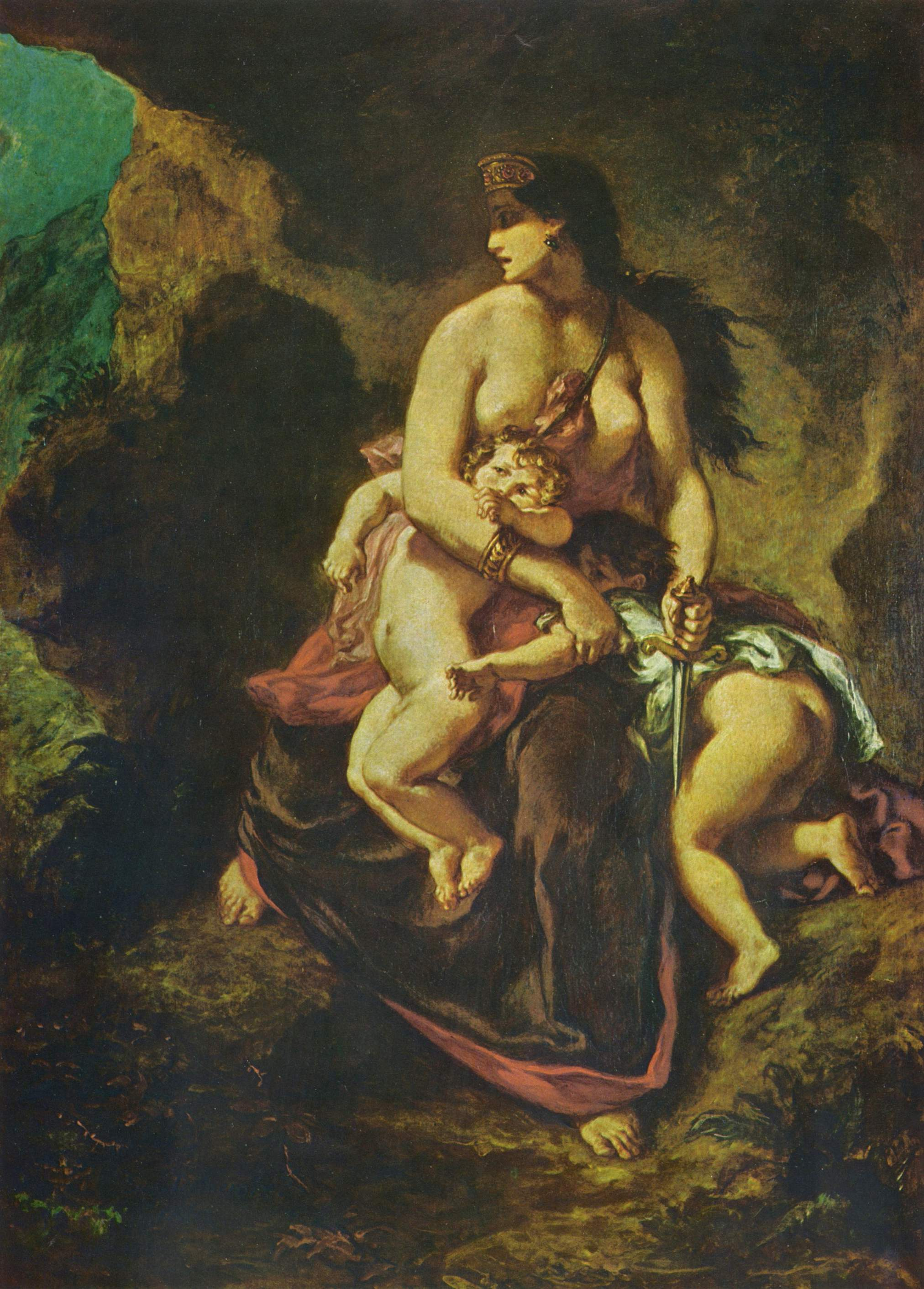
Medea About to Murder Her Children by Eugène Ferdinand Victor Delacroix (1862)

The spoken language of the Euripidean plays is not fundamentally different in style from that of Aeschylus or Sophocles: it employs poetic meters, a rarefied vocabulary, fullness of expression, complex syntax, and ornamental figures, all aimed at representing an elevated style. But its rhythms are somewhat freer, and more natural, than that of his predecessors, and the vocabulary has been expanded to allow for intellectual and psychological subtleties. Euripides has been hailed as a great lyric poet. In Medea, for example, he composed for his city, Athens, "the noblest of her songs of praise". His lyrical skills are not just confined to individual poems: "A play of Euripides is a musical whole...one song echoes motifs from the preceding song, while introducing new ones." For some critics, the lyrics often seem dislocated from the action, but the extent and significance of this is "a matter of scholarly debate". See Chronology for details about his style.

== Reception ==
Euripides was so widely read in the antique education that only Homer surpassed him. But the breadth of reception drew mixed responses. He aroused, and continues to arouse, strong opinions for and against his work:

He was a problem to his contemporaries and he is one still; over the course of centuries since his plays were first produced he has been hailed or indicted under a bewildering variety of labels. He has been described as 'the poet of the Greek enlightenment' and also as 'Euripides the irrationalist'; as a religious sceptic if not an atheist, but on the other hand, as a believer in divine providence and the ultimate justice of divine dispensation. He has been seen as a profound explorer of human psychology and also a rhetorical poet who subordinated consistency of character to verbal effect; as a misogynist and a feminist; as a realist who brought tragic action down to the level of everyday life and as a romantic poet who chose unusual myths and exotic settings. He wrote plays which have been widely understood as patriotic pieces supporting Athens's war against Sparta and others which many have taken as the work of the anti-war dramatist par excellence, even as attacks on Athenian imperialism. He has been recognized as the precursor of New Comedy and also what Aristotle called him: 'the most tragic of poets' (Poetics 1453a30). And not one of these descriptions is entirely false. — Bernard Knox

Aeschylus gained thirteen victories as a dramatist; Sophocles at least twenty; Euripides only four in his lifetime; and this has often been taken as indication of the latter's unpopularity. But a first place might not have been the main criterion for success (the system of selecting judges appears to have been flawed), and merely being chosen to compete was a mark of distinction. Moreover, to have been singled out by Aristophanes for so much comic attention is proof of popular interest in his work. Sophocles was appreciative enough of the younger poet to be influenced by him, as is evident in his later plays Philoctetes and Oedipus at Colonus. According to Plutarch, Euripides had been very well received in Sicily, to the extent that after the failure of the Sicilian Expedition, many Athenian captives were released, simply for being able to teach their captors whatever fragments they could remember of his work. Less than a hundred years later, Aristotle developed an almost "biological' theory of the development of tragedy in Athens: the art form grew under the influence of Aeschylus, matured in the hands of Sophocles, then began its precipitous decline with Euripides. However, "his plays continued to be applauded even after those of Aeschylus and Sophocles had come to seem remote and irrelevant"; they became school classics in the Hellenistic period (as mentioned in the introduction) and, due to Seneca's adaptation of his work for Roman audiences, "it was Euripides, not Aeschylus or Sophocles, whose tragic muse presided over the rebirth of tragedy in Renaissance Europe."

In the seventeenth century, Racine expressed admiration for Sophocles, but was more influenced by Euripides (Iphigenia in Aulis and Hippolytus were the models for his plays Iphigénie and Phèdre). Euripides's reputation was to take a beating in the early 19th century, when Friedrich Schlegel and his brother August Wilhelm Schlegel championed Aristotle's 'biological' model of theatre history, identifying Euripides with the moral, political, and artistic degeneration of Athens. August Wilhelm's Vienna lectures on dramatic art and literature went through four editions between 1809 and 1846; and, in them, he opined that Euripides "not only destroyed the external order of tragedy but missed its entire meaning". This view influenced Friedrich Nietzsche, who seems, however, not to have known the Euripidean plays well. But literary figures, such as the poet Robert Browning and his wife Elizabeth Barrett Browning, could study and admire the Schlegels, while still appreciating Euripides as "our Euripides the human" (Wine of Cyprus stanza 12). Classicists such as Arthur Verrall and Ulrich von Wilamowitz-Moellendorff reacted against the views of the Schlegels and Nietzsche, constructing arguments sympathetic to Euripides, which involved Wilamowitz in this restatement of Greek tragedy as a genre: "A [Greek] tragedy does not have to end 'tragically' or be 'tragic'. The only requirement is a serious treatment." In the English-speaking world, the pacifist Gilbert Murray played an important role in popularizing Euripides, influenced perhaps by his anti-war plays. Today, as in the time of Euripides, traditional assumptions are constantly under challenge, and audiences therefore have a natural affinity with the Euripidean outlook, which seems nearer to ours, for example, than the Elizabethan. As stated above, however, opinions continue to diverge, so that modern readers might actually "seem to feel a special affinity with Sophocles"; one recent critic might dismiss the debates in Euripides's plays as "self-indulgent digression for the sake of rhetorical display"; and one spring to the defence: "His plays are remarkable for their range of tones and the gleeful inventiveness, which morose critics call cynical artificiality, of their construction."

== Texts ==
=== Transmission ===
The textual transmission of the plays, from the 5th century BC, when they were first written, until the era of the printing press, was a largely haphazard process. Much of Euripides's work was lost or corrupted; but the period also included triumphs by scholars and copyists, thanks to whom much was recovered and preserved. Summaries of the transmission are often found in modern scholarly editions of the plays, three of which are used as sources for this summary.

The plays of Euripides, like those of Aeschylus and Sophocles, circulated in written form. But literary conventions that we take for granted today had not been invented: there was no spacing between words; no consistency in punctuation, nor elisions; no marks for breathings and accents (guides to pronunciation, and word recognition); no convention to denote change of speaker; no stage directions; and verse was written straight across the page, like prose. Possibly, those who bought texts supplied their own interpretative markings. Papyri discoveries have indicated, for example, that a change in speakers was loosely denoted with a variety of signs, such as equivalents of the modern dash, colon, and full-stop. The absence of modern literary conventions (which aid comprehension), was an early and persistent source of errors, affecting transmission. Errors were also introduced when Athens replaced its old Attic alphabet with the Ionian alphabet, a change sanctioned by law in 403–402 BC, adding a new complication to the task of copying. Many more errors came from the tendency of actors to interpolate words and sentences, producing so many corruptions and variations that a law was proposed by Lycurgus of Athens in 330 BC "that the plays of Aeschylus, Sophocles and Euripides should be written down and preserved in a public office; and that the town clerk should read the text over with the actors; and that all performances which did not comply with this regulation should be illegal." The law was soon disregarded, and actors continued to make changes until about 200 BC, after which the habit ceased. It was about then that Aristophanes of Byzantium compiled an edition of all the extant plays of Euripides, collated from pre-Alexandrian texts, furnished with introductions and accompanied by a commentary that was "published" separately. This became the "standard edition" for the future, and it featured some of the literary conventions that modern readers expect: there was still no spacing between words; little or no punctuation; and no stage directions; but abbreviated names denoted changes of speaker; lyrics were broken into "cola" and "strophai", or lines and stanzas; and a system of accentuation was introduced.

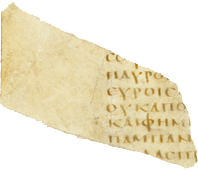
Fragment of a vellum codex from the fourth or fifth centuries AD, showing choral anapaests from Medea, lines 1087–91. Though tiny, the fragment influences modern editions of the play, since the reading οὐκ (visible here) is adopted by modern scholars in preference to the reading κοὐκ found in mediaeval manuscripts. (Note: παῦρον ⌊δὲ δὴγένος ἐν πολλαῖς εὕροις ⌊ἂν ἴσως οὐκ ἀπό⌊μουσον τὸ γυναικῶν. καί φημι ⌊βροτῶν οἵτινές εἰσιν πάμπαν ⌊ἄπειροι μηδ΄ ἐφύτευσαν παῖ⌋δας͵ ⌊προφέρειν εἰς εὐτυχίαν ⌊τῶν γειναμένων.⌋ "Among many women, you might find a small class who are not uneducated. And I tell you that those who have no experience of children and parenthood are better off than those who do" (Medea, lines 1087–1091). Half brackets enclose words not transmitted by the fragment but supplied by the wider tradition, in accordance with the Leiden Conventions. See Page 1938, p. 151, note on lines 1087–89.)

After this creation of a standard edition, the text was fairly safe from errors, besides slight and gradual corruption introduced with tedious copying. Many of these trivial errors occurred in the Byzantine period, following a change in script (from uncial to minuscule). Many of these errors were "homophonic" errors, the equivalent (for instance) of substituting "right" for "write" in English: there were many opportunities for Byzantine scribes to make errors of this sort, since η, ι, οι and ει were pronounced similarly in the Byzantine period.

Around 200 AD, ten of the plays of Euripides began to be circulated in a select edition, possibly for use in schools, with some commentaries or scholia recorded in the margins. Similar editions had appeared for Aeschylus and Sophocles—the only plays of theirs that survive today. In Euripides's case, however, a further nine plays have also survived, compiled in alphabetical order as if from a set of his collected works, without any scholia attached. These "alphabetical" plays were combined with the "select" edition by some unknown Byzantine scholar, bringing together the nineteen plays that survive today. The "select" plays are found in many medieval manuscripts, but only two manuscripts preserve the "Alphabetical" plays. These two manuscripts are usually denoted as L and P, after the Laurentian Library at Florence, and the Bibliotheca Palatina in the Vatican, where they are stored. It is believed that P derived its texts of all the "alphabetical" plays and of some (but not all) "select" plays from copies of an ancestor of L. P contains all the extant plays of Euripides, but Trojan Woman and the latter part of Bacchae are missing from L. (For a list of the "select" and "alphabetical" plays, see Extant plays below.)

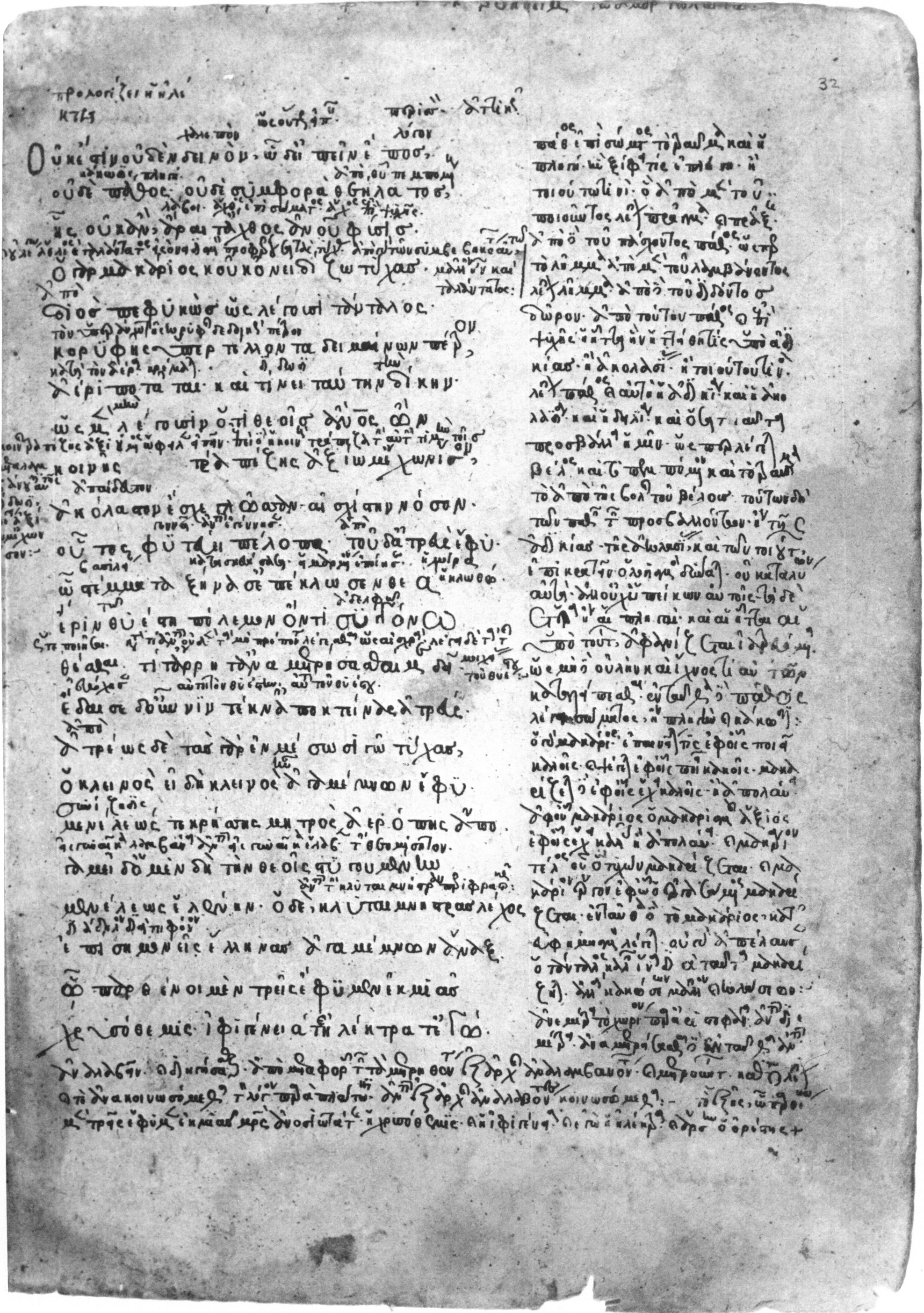
Euripides, Orestes, Oxford, MS. Barocci 120, fol. 32r (early 14th century)

In addition to the medieval manuscripts, there are some papyri preserving fragments from Euripides's work. These papyrus fragments are often recovered only with modern technology. In June 2005, for example, classicists at the University of Oxford worked on a joint project with Brigham Young University, using multi-spectral imaging technology to retrieve previously illegible writing (see References). Some of this work employed infrared technology—previously used for satellite imaging—to detect previously unknown material by Euripides, in fragments of the Oxyrhynchus papyri, a collection of ancient manuscripts held by the university.

It is from such materials that modern scholars try to piece together copies of the original plays. Sometimes the picture is almost lost. Thus, for example, two extant plays, The Phoenician Women and Iphigenia in Aulis, are significantly corrupted by interpolations (the latter possibly being completed post mortem by the poet's son); and the very authorship of Rhesus is a matter of dispute. In fact, the very existence of the Alphabet plays, or rather the absence of an equivalent edition for Sophocles and Aeschylus, could distort our notions of distinctive Euripidean qualities—most of his least "tragic" plays are in the Alphabet edition; and, possibly, the other two tragedians would appear just as genre-bending as this "restless experimenter", if we possessed more than their "select" editions.

=== Chronology ===
Original production dates for some of Euripides's plays are known from ancient records, such as lists of prize-winners at the Dionysia; and approximations are obtained for the remainder by various means. Both the playwright and his work were travestied by comic poets such as Aristophanes, the known dates of whose own plays can serve as a terminus ad quem for those of Euripides (though the gap can be considerable: twenty-seven years separate Telephus, known to have been produced in 438 BC, from its parody in Thesmophoriazusae in 411 BC.). References in Euripides's plays to contemporary events provide a terminus a quo, though sometimes the references might even precede a datable event (e.g. lines 1074–89 in Ion describe a procession to Eleusis, which was probably written before the Spartans occupied it during the Peloponnesian War). Other indications of dating are obtained by stylometry.

Greek tragedy comprised lyric and dialogue, the latter mostly in iambic trimeter (three pairs of iambic feet per line). Euripides sometimes 'resolved' the two syllables of the iamb (˘¯) into three syllables (˘˘˘), and this tendency increased so steadily over time that the number of resolved feet in a play can indicate an approximate date of composition (see Extant plays below for one scholar's list of resolutions per hundred trimeters). Associated with this increase in resolutions was an increasing vocabulary, often involving prefixes to refine meanings, allowing the language to assume a more natural rhythm, while also becoming ever more capable of psychological and philosophical subtlety.

The trochaic tetrameter catalectic—four pairs of trochees per line, with the final syllable omitted—was identified by Aristotle as the original meter of tragic dialogue (Poetics 1449a21). Euripides employs it here and there in his later plays, but seems not to have used it in his early plays at all, with The Trojan Women being the earliest appearance of it in an extant play—it is symptomatic of an archaizing tendency in his later works.

The later plays also feature extensive use of stichomythia (i.e. a series of one-liners). The longest such scene comprises one hundred and five lines in Ion (lines 264–369). By contrast, Aeschylus never exceeds twenty lines of stichomythia, while Sophocles's longest such scene (Electra, 1176–1226) is fifty lines long, and that is interrupted several times by antilabe.

Euripides's use of lyrics in sung parts shows the influence of Timotheus of Miletus in the later plays—the individual singer gained prominence, and was given additional scope to demonstrate his virtuosity in lyrical duets, as well as replacing some of the chorus's functions with monodies. At the same time, choral odes began to take on something of the form of dithyrambs reminiscent of the poetry of Bacchylides, featuring elaborate treatment of myths. Sometimes these later choral odes seem to have only a tenuous connection with the plot, linked to the action only in their mood. The Bacchae, however, shows a reversion to old forms, possibly as a deliberate archaic effect, or because there were no virtuoso choristers in Macedonia (where it is said to have been written).

=== Extant plays ===
Estimated chronological order
Play	Date BC	Prize	Lineage	Resolutions	Genre (and notes)
Alcestis	438	2nd	S	6.2	tragedy
Medea	431	3rd	S	6.6	tragedy
Heracleidae	c. 430		A	5.7	tragedy
Hippolytus	428	1st	S	4.3	tragedy
Andromache	c. 425		S	11.3	tragedy
Hecuba	c. 424		S	12.7	tragedy
The Suppliants	c. 423		A	13.6	tragedy
Electra	c. 420		A	16.9	tragedy
Herakles	c. 416		A	21.5	tragedy
The Trojan Women	415	2nd	S	21.2	tragedy
Iphigenia in Tauris	c. 414		A	23.4	tragedy
Ion	c. 413		A	25.8	tragedy
Helen	412		A	27.5	tragedy
Phoenician Women	c. 410	2nd	S	25.8	tragedy
Orestes	408		S	39.4	tragedy
Bacchae	405	1st	S	37.6	tragedy (posthumously produced)
Iphigenia in Aulis	405	1st	A	34.7	tragedy (posthumously produced with extensive interpolations)
Rhesus	?		S	8.1	tragedy (authorship disputed)
Cyclops	?		A		satyr play (the only fully extant example of this genre)

Key:

Date indicates date of first production.
Prize indicates a place known to have been awarded in festival competition.
Lineage: S denotes plays surviving from a 'Select' or 'School' edition, A plays surviving from an 'Alphabetical' edition—see Transmission above for details.
Resolutions: Number of resolved feet per 100 trimeters, Ceadel's list—see Chronology above for details.
Genre: Generic orientation (see 'Transmission' section) with additional notes in brackets.

=== Lost and fragmentary plays ===
The following plays have come down to us in fragmentary form, if at all. They are known through quotations in other works (sometimes as little as a single line); pieces of papyrus; partial copies in manuscript; part of a collection of hypotheses (or summaries); and through being parodied in the works of Aristophanes. Some of the fragments, such as those of Hypsipyle, are extensive enough to allow tentative reconstructions to be proposed.

A two-volume selection from the fragments, with facing-page translation, introductions, and notes, was published by Collard, Cropp, Lee, and Gibert; as were two Loeb Classical Library volumes derived from them; and there are critical studies in T. B. L. Webster's older The Tragedies of Euripides, based on what were then believed to be the most likely reconstructions of the plays.

The following lost and fragmentary plays can be dated, and are arranged in roughly chronological order:

- Peliades (455 BC)
- Telephus (438 BC with Alcestis)
- Alcmaeon in Psophis (438 BC with Alcestis)
- Cretan Women (438 with Alcestis)
- Cretans (c. 435 BC)
- Philoctetes (431 BC with Medea)
- Dictys (431 BC with Medea)
- Theristai (Reapers, satyr play, 431 BC with Medea)
- Stheneboea (before 429 BC)
- Bellerophon (c. 430 BC)
- Cresphontes (c. 425 BC)
- Erechtheus (422 BC)
- Phaethon (c. 420 BC)
- Wise Melanippe (c. 420 BC)
- Alexandros (415 BC with Trojan Women)
- Palamedes (415 BC with Trojan Women)
- Sisyphus (satyr play, 415 BC with Trojan Women)
- Captive Melanippe (c. 412 BC)
- Andromeda (412 BC with Helen)
- Antiope (c. 410 BC)
- Archelaus (c. 410 BC)
- Hypsipyle (c. 410 BC)
- Alcmaeon in Corinth (c. 405 BC) Won first prize as part of a trilogy with The Bacchae and Iphigenia in Aulis

The following lost and fragmentary plays are of uncertain date, and are arranged in English alphabetical order.

- Aegeus
- Aeolus
- Alcmene
- Alope, or Cercyon
- Antigone
- Auge
- Autolycus
- Busiris
- Cadmus
- Chrysippus
- Danae
- Epeius
- Eurystheus
- Hippolytus Veiled
- Ino
- Ixion
- Lamia
- Licymnius
- Meleager
- Mysians
- Oedipus
- Oeneus
- Oenomaus
- Peirithous
- Peleus
- Phoenix
- Phrixus
- Pleisthenes
- Polyidus
- Protesilaus
- Rhadamanthys
- Sciron
- Scyrians
- Syleus
- Temenidae
- Temenus
- Tennes
- Theseus
- Thyestes

=== The "New Euripides" ===
In 2022, a papyrus was discovered at the archaeological site of Philadelphia, in Faiyum, Egypt, containing previously unknown fragments of Euripides's Ino and Polyidus, which were publicized in August 2024. The first scholarly edition of the new fragments, providing the Greek text and an English translation, was published the same year in the Zeitschrift für Papyrologie und Epigraphik.
