= Bellerophon (play) =

Lost Ancient Greek tragedy by Euripides

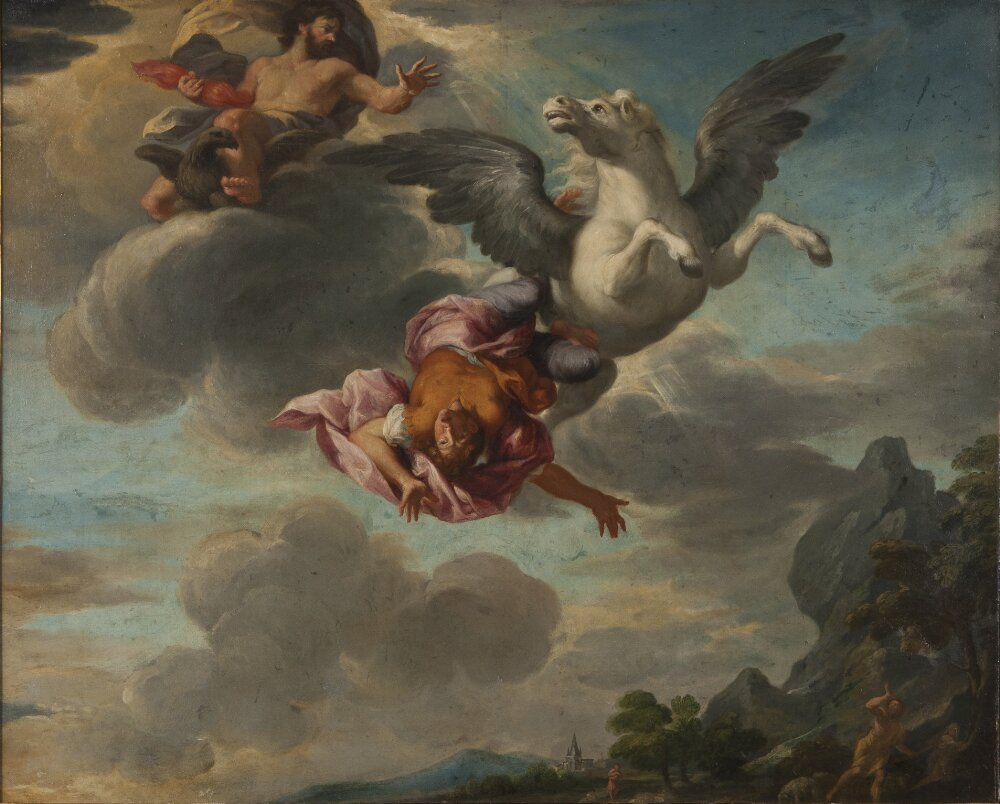
- Jupiter casts away Bellerophon, oil on canvas by unknown artist
- Original language: Classical Greek
- Written by: Euripides
- Characters: Bellerophon, Glaucos, others
- Genre: Tragedy

Premiere
- Place: Athens

Bellerophon (Ancient Greek: Βελλεροφῶν, Bellerophōn) is an ancient Greek tragedy written by Euripides, based upon the myth of Bellerophon. Most of the play was lost by the end of the Antiquity, and only 90 verses, grouped into 29 fragments, currently survive.

== Plot ==
Given the fragmentary state of this tragedy, the plot remains open to conjecture. Most modern critics nevertheless agree on the following storyline.

The play apparently began with Bellerophon riding his horse Pegasus carried in the air by the crane.

Bellerophon, who seems to have lost everything, lives on an uncultivated land with his father Glaucos and Pegasus. Deeply pessimistic about his condition, Bellerophon eventually believes the gods do not exist.

He subsequently decides to reach Mount Olympus, thanks to Pegasus's flying abilities. The motives of such an ascent have remained unclear. Regardless, Pegasus falls with his rider and the wounded Bellerophon is brought to the stage. Having repented for his blasphemous behaviour, Bellerophon dies.

== Translations ==
- Euripide, Tragédies, vol. 8, 2e part. Fragments. De Bellérophon à Protésilas; Greek text and French translation by François Jouan and Herman Van Looy; Paris, Les Belles Lettres, 2000, 2002, 2003.

== Studies ==
- N. Wecklein, Tragödien des Euripides: Bellerophontes, 98-109, SBAW, 1888
- A. Caputi Euripide e le sue tragedie sul mito di Bellerofonte, 509-515, RAL, 1909
- M. Pohlenz, Die Grichische Tragödie, I pages 290-293 and II 123-124, Göttingen, 1954
- Z. V. Vykozy, De Euripidis Bellerophonte, pages 137-145, ZJFK, 1963. This Czech essay was translated into German in BCO, 358, 1964.
- A. Carlini, Due note euripidee, 201-205, SCO, 1965
- P. Rau, Paratragœdia, 89-91, Munich, 1967
- Lamberto Di Gregorio, Il Bellerofonte di Euripide. I. Dati per una ricostruzione; II. Tentativa di ricostruzione, 195-214 and 365-382, CCC, 1983
- Christoph Riedweg, The "atheistic" fragment from Euripides "Bellerophontes", 39-53, ICS, 1990
- Mariarita Paterlini, Note al Bellerofonte euripideo, 513-523, Sileno, 1990.
