= An Essay Upon Projects =

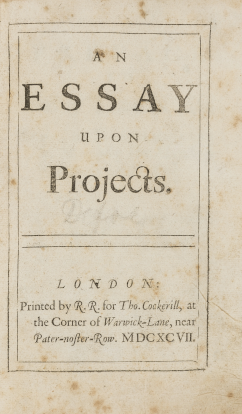
- Author: Daniel Defoe
- Language: English
- Publisher: Printed by R. R. for Tho[mas] Cockerill, at the Three Legs in the Poultrey
- Publication date: 1697
- Publication place: London, England
- Media type: Print
- Pages: xiv; 336
- OCLC: 6978589

An Essay Upon Projects (1697) was the first volume published by Daniel Defoe. It begins with an introduction containing a portrait of his time as a "Projecting Age", and subsequently illustrates plans for the economic and social improvement of England, including an early proposal for a national insurance scheme.

== Publication ==
The text was written in 1693 and published in 1697. The title page states that it was "[p]rinted by R. R. for Tho[mas] Cockerill, at the Three Legs in the Poultrey. MDCXCVII." There is no known manuscript of the work. The essay was reprinted several times and reached a wide audience. The book was dedicated to Dalby Thomas.

== Subsequent publications on the same theme ==
Many of its issues were later revised in a series of pamphlets which were published under the nom-de-plume of Andrew Moreton. They are titled Every-body's Business, Is No-body's Business (1725), The Protestant Monastery (1726), Parochial Tyranny (1727), Augusta Triumphans (1728) and Second Thoughts are Best (1729). Compared to these works, however, An Essay Upon Projects is more focused on moral criticism than being project-oriented.

== A list of the chapters ==
- Author's Preface – to Dalby Thomas, Esq.
- Author's Introduction
- The History of Projects
- Of Projectors
- Of Banks
- Of the Highways
- Of Assurances
- Of Friendly Societies
- The Proposal is for a Pension Office
- Of Wagering
- Of Fools
- Of Bankrupts
- Of Academies
- Of a Court Merchant
- Of Seamen
- The Conclusion

== Bibliography ==
- Backscheider, P B, Daniel Defoe.His Life, The Johns Hopkins University Press, Baltimore and London, 1989.
- “Social Projects”, Daniel Defoe. The Collection of the Lily Library, Indiana University Bloomington, 2008, retrieved 25 October 2015, <http://www.indiana.edu/~liblilly/defoe/projects.html>
- George, M D, London Life in the Eighteenth Century, Penguin Books, Great Britain, 1979.
- Maldonado, Tomás (2002). "Defoe and the 'Projecting Age'". Design Issues. 18 (1): 78–85. doi:10.1162/07479360252756313. JSTOR 1512032. S2CID 57567525.
- Moore, John Robert (1971). "Defoe's Persona as Author: The Quaker's Sermon". SEL: Studies in English Literature 1500–1900. 11 (3): 507–516. doi:10.2307/449910. JSTOR 449910.
- Novak, M E, “Last Productive Years”, Daniel Defoe Master of Fictions. His Life and Ideas, Oxford University Press, United States of America, 2001.
