= Augusta Triumphans =

1728 pamphlet by Daniel Defoe

- Title page of the 1728 edition of Augusta Triumphans in the Bodleian Libraries, University of Oxford
- Author: Daniel Defoe
- Original title: Augusta Triumphans: Or, The Way to Make London the Most Flourishing City in the Universe
- Language: English
- Genre: Pamphlet
- Publication date: 16 March 1728 (298 years ago)
- Publication place: England

Augusta Triumphans: or, the Way to Make London the Most Flourishing City in the Universe by Daniel Defoe was first published on 16 March 1728. The fictitious speaker of this pamphlet, Andrew Moreton, is a man in his sixties who offers suggestions for the improvement of London. In particular, he fosters the establishment of a university, an academy of music, a hospital for foundlings and licensed institutions for the treatment of mental diseases. Moreover, he encourages the introduction of measures to prevent moral corruption and street robbery.

Augusta Triumphans is part of a group of works which were issued under the nom-de-plume of Andrew Moreton. It includes also Every-body's Business, Is No-body's Business (1725), The Protestant Monastery (1726), Parochial Tyranny (1727), and Second Thoughts are Best (1729). They respectively deal with the high salary of servants, disrespect towards elders, corruption of parishes, and crime prevention. They all revisit themes which their author, Daniel Defoe, had already discussed in An Essay Upon Projects (1697). Compared to this earlier work, however, they are more project-oriented than focused on moral criticism.

As Maximillian Novak points out, Defoe chose a "grand title" for Augusta Triumphans. It highlights his ambitious aim of making London stand out even at a universal level. This city has a significant role in both his biography and work. Firstly, his travels started and ended in this place. Secondly, it is "the implicit or explicit setting" of the majority of his writings.

== Subject and overall structure ==
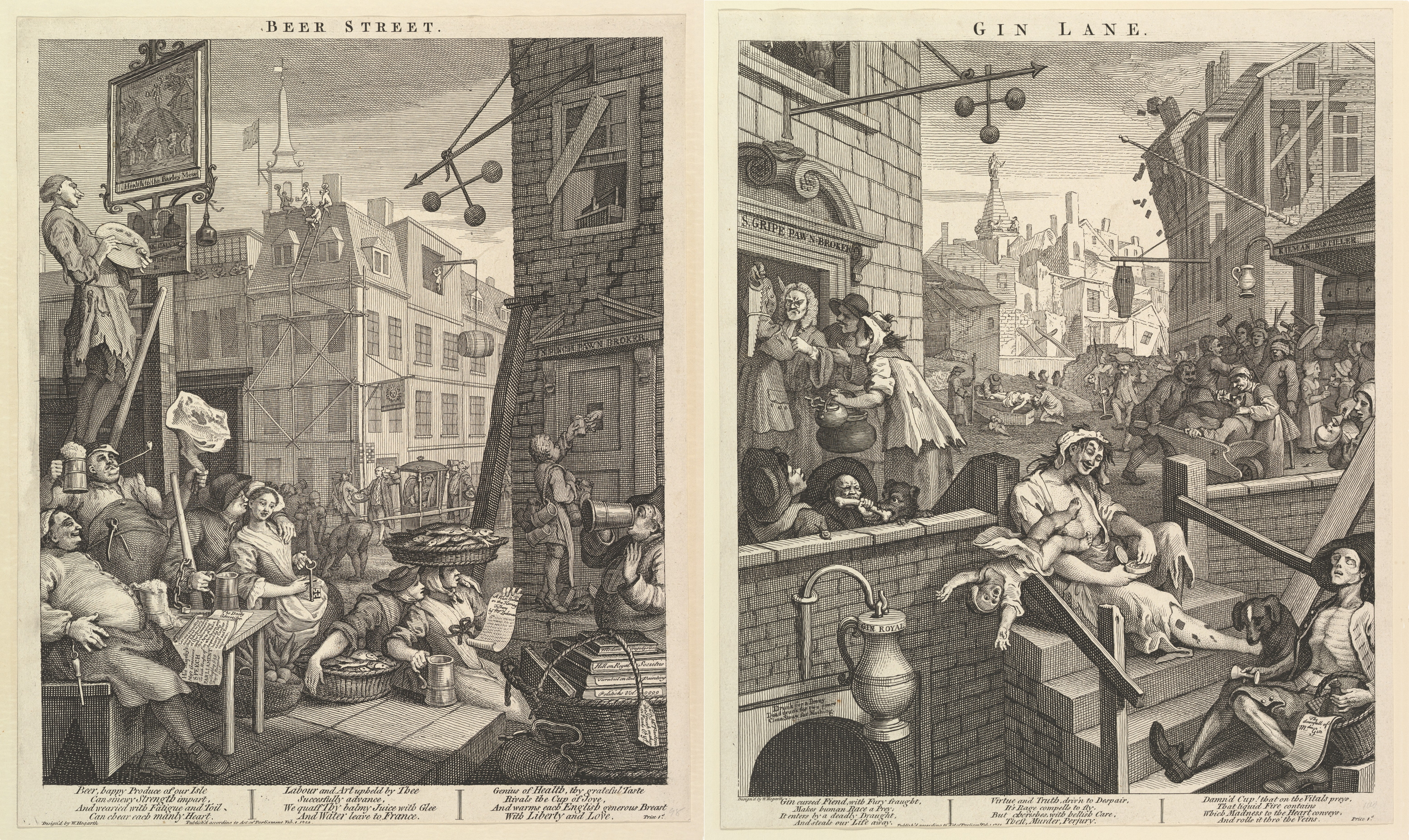
Beer Street and Gin Lane (1751) by William Hogarth

Augusta Triumphans offers suggestions for the enhancement of the city of London. It begins with two introductory paragraphs. The former is a brief reflection on "projecting heads" and the attitude of the English towards them."Projecting heads", that is to say individuals who create schemes for social improvement, are invited to make proposals without fearing to be ridiculed. They should exclusively focus on offering honest advice. In addition, the possible shortcomings of their projects should be forgiven in that "It is a kind of good action to mean well, and the intention ought to palliate the failure". As for the English, they are described as the least clement nation towards such individuals. They "treat them in the vilest manner" and it is because of this reason that their country is "esteemed so bad at invention". In the second opening paragraph, the narrator explains the reason why he has written this pamphlet. He wants to make good use of the remaining time of his life by putting innovative proposals down on paper. On the whole, this work is intended to be the "testimony of" his "good will to" his "fellow-creatures".

Immediately after this introductory discourse, Andrew Moreton moves on to illustrate the project upon which he has reflected most. He fosters the establishment of a London university to oppose the contemporary corruption of learning and education. Subsequently, four titled sections come one after the other and present other schemes for social improvement. Section one calls for the establishment of a foundling hospital. It would prevent many mothers from freeing themselves of their illegitimate offspring through abortion or abandonment in parishes which do not offer them decent living conditions. Section two shows how a real academy of music would "prevent the expensive importation of foreign musicians, & c". Section three firstly offers advice to rescue "youths and servants" from moral corruption. Secondly, it denounces certain social evils: prostitution, gambling, and a series of dissolute manners to spend one's free time on Sunday such as alcohol misuse. Thirdly, it makes a digression on husbands's abuses of their wives and comments about contemporary private madhouses. Section four encourages the adoption of measures to stop street robbery. They include moral education and the introduction of a competent and paid body of watchmen as well as an adequate system of street lighting at night.

The final part of Augusta Triumphans is titled "Omissions". It is a revision of two aspects of the projects which have been illustrated so far. Andrew Moreton begins with rejecting his initial idea of founding a London university composed of "only a hall or public room". Rather, "it should be a large house or inn, in the nature of a college, with store of convenient rooms for gentlemen, not only to study separately, but wherein to lodge their books, for it would be most inconvenient to lug them backwards and forwards". He then expands his "discourse on madhouses", particularly by offering a suggestion to impede the unjust confinement of widows or other women who find themselves with a fortune and no male guidance. In order to prevent them from becoming victims of greedy and manipulatory "strangers", the nearest male relative should succeed the deceased gentleman in the management of the estate.

At the end of the pamphlet is attached a letter "To Lieutenant-Colonel Samuel Robinson" which is dated "Sept. 23, 1728". Its signatory, Andrew Moreton, begins with briefly congratulating the addressee for his "election into the chamberlainship of the city of London". He subsequently poses a series of questions to understand the purpose of "the orphan's tax".

== "Schemists" and their time ==
The theme of human capability to project is touched upon at the beginning of Augusta Triumphans when Andrew Moreton briefly comments on "schemists". These figures are mentioned also in An Essay Upon Projects. In its introduction, the author points out that his country "swarms with [...] a multitude of" planners. This project-oriented climate originates from the widespread need to cope with contemporary problems and chaos. Moreover, since no other age was characterised by such a trend, his epoch could be defined as a "Projecting Age".

Daniel Defoe dealt with "the theme of [...] man's capacity to project" also in An Essay Upon Projects (1697) and Robinson Crusoe (1719). They respectively are an explicit and an implicit treatment of the same topic. In addition to be characterised by opposite approaches, they differ in perspective. An Essay Upon Projects is socially oriented in that it addresses issues which are of importance for a whole community. Robinson Crusoe, on the other hand, focuses on the interests of a single human being.

== Andrew Moreton's proposals for the improvement of London ==
=== The establishment of new institutions ===
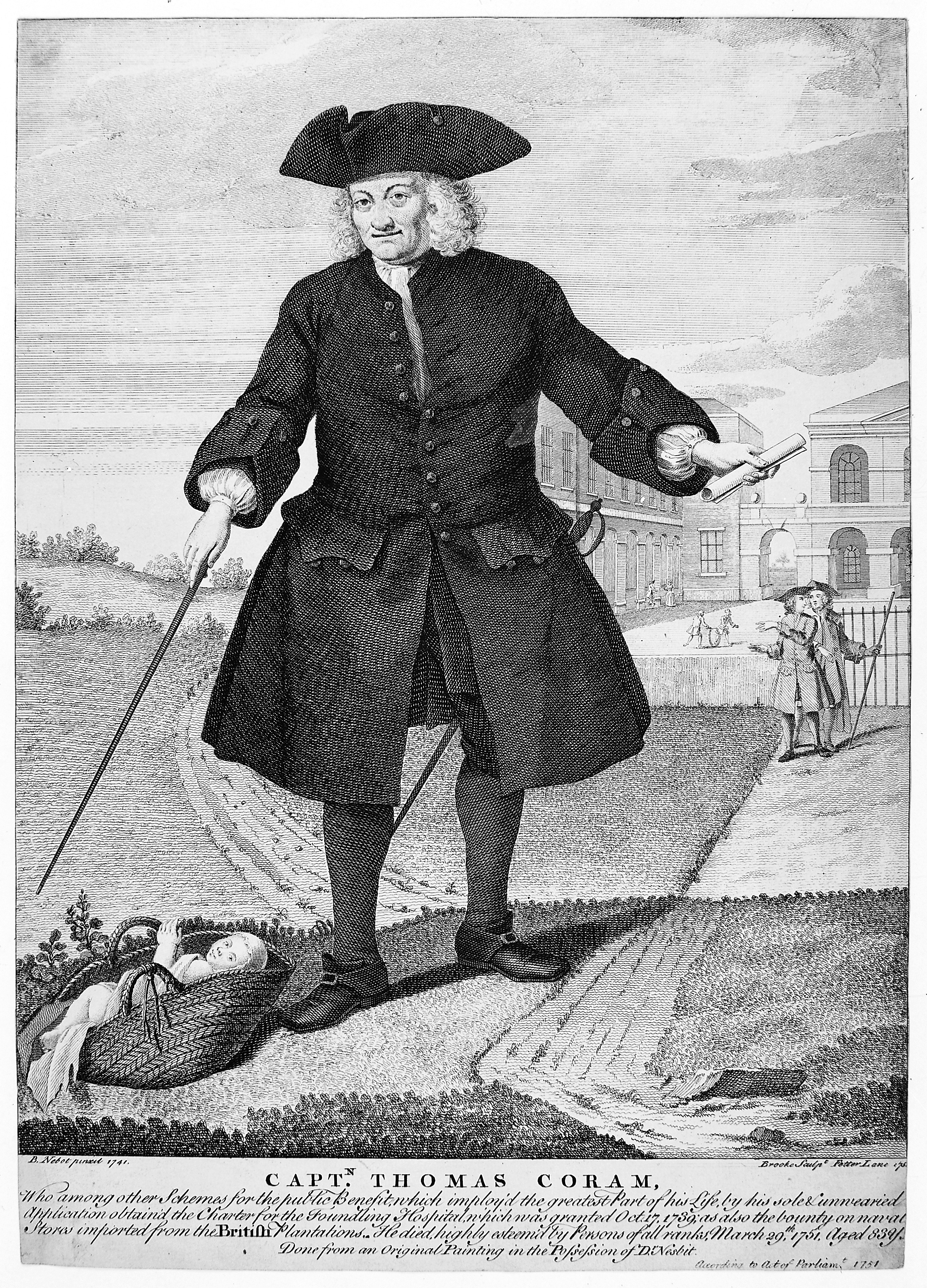
Thomas Coram in front of his Hospital with an Infant by J. Brooke (1751), after B. Nebot (1741)

In Augusta Triumphans, Andrew Moreton promotes the foundation of a university, an academy of music and a hospital for foundlings. He begins with calling for a university in London and stresses the reasons for making it non-residential. Firstly, by keep living under the same roof with their families of origin, students are not left to their own devices. and are less likely to fall into temptation. Young men who are sent to Cambridge or Oxford, on the other hand, waste their time drinking rather than learning themselves. Secondly, by daily returning to their family's quarter, they contribute to the cultural flourish of London society; they can spread the academic knowledge they acquire through conversation. Overall, the privileged beneficiary of this plan is the gentry whose residential areas are included in the list of places where Moreton advises establishing colleges: Westminster, St. James and Ormond Street. This social group is also invited to finance the whole project "by subscription".

Subsequently, Andrew Moreton urges the establishment of a foundling hospital. This would prevent many mothers from getting rid of their illegitimate offspring through abortion or abandoning them in parishes which are incapable of offering them adequate shelter. This issue recurs in Defoe's other works, particularly in the novels Moll Flanders (1722), Roxana (1724), and in the essay Conjugal Lewdness (1727). In the early eighteenth century, a large number of abandoned children. were either left on the streets of London or put into the care of parishes. However, the latter were not considered reliable. Some dissipated the money which was supposed to be spent on the support of children; others were accused of entrusting orphans to the care of dishonest nurses selected on the basis of the cheapness of the service they provided.

Lastly, Defoe's fictitious speaker fosters the establishment of an academy of music "to prevent the expensive importation of foreign musicians & c.". He points out that the then existing Italian opera, which is financed by upper class lovers of this art, is "improperly called academy" in that it just hires costly foreign musicians. It does not encourage the "propagation of science, by training up persons thereto from younger to riper years, under the instruction and inspection of proper artists". When Augusta Triumphans was published, there existed a joint stock company whose denomination was Royal Academy of Music. Founded in 1719, it became operative in 1720. Thanks to governmental subsidies, it could afford to pay salaries which were "beyond the theatre's inherent capacity to pay".

=== Preventing the moral corruption of youths and servants ===
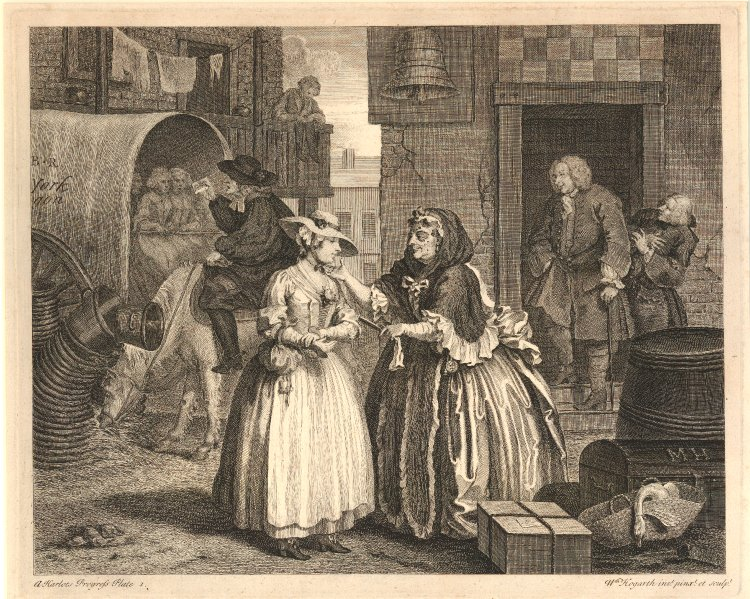
A Harlot's Progress, Plate 1 (1732), etching an engraving by William Hogarth

Andrew Moreton encourages the introduction of measures to render servants faithful to their job. Firstly, they should be offered salaries which are not excessively high. In particular, their amount could be set on the basis of their capability of working and managing money. Secondly, the judicial system should not allow them to resign without just cause. Lastly, masters ought not to abuse them. This scheme aims primarily to keep servants away from idleness and bad company that may lead them into vice and crime.

Eighteenth-century London was populated by a large number of migrants seeking job opportunities. Being alone and unaware of city dangers, they could easily become pray of unscrupulous people. Young girls, for instance, could be led into prostitution by manipulative individuals approaching them at their arrival. Procurers could take the advantage of "the custom of mistresses to meet the wagons which brought country girls to London in order to find and engage servants". According to M. Dorothy George, "the first scene in Hogarth's Harlot's Progress was one frequently played in real life".

=== Reforming the madhouse system ===
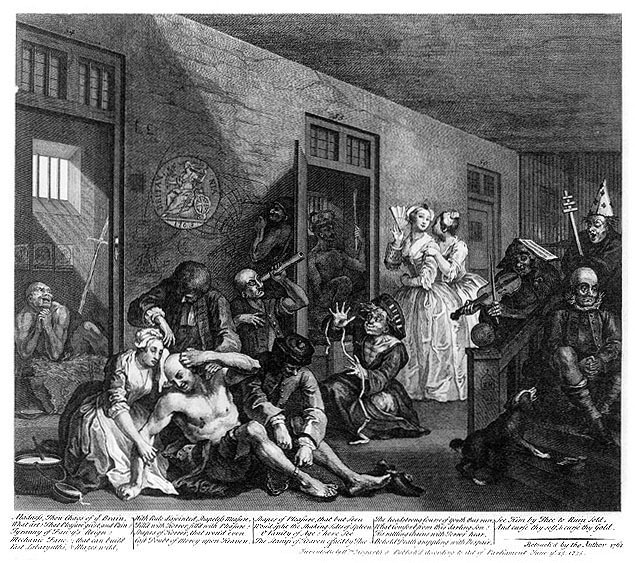
In the Madhouse - Plate 8 in A Rake's Progress (1735) by William Hogarth

Andrew Moreton reflects also upon the contemporary system of private madhouses and denounces its inefficiency. In the first place, he notices that it allows the institutionalisation of individuals who are affected by no mental disease. For instance, they frequently admit healthy wives. confined by abusive husbands for the sole purpose of getting rid of them. In the second place, he points out that they do not guarantee adequate treatment of patients in that their staffs neglect or abuse them. In the light of this, he suggests substituting them with "licensed madhouses" which are "subject to proper visitation and inspection" and where nobody can be "sent [...] without due reason, inquiry, and authority".

In the eighteenth century, private madhouses were much discussed. Nicholas Hervey points out that Defoe was "among the first to question the practice of these institutions in Augusta Triumphans (1728)". He was late followed by Tobias Smollett who wrote the novel Sir Lancelot Greaves (1762). in which the hero of the title criticises unfair detention in madhouses. and reflects upon the difference between sanity and mental illness. In 1763, the Gentleman's Magazine also denounced the abuse of a series of patients in asylums.

Nicholas Hervey also notices that Defoe "attacked the way husbands were able to confine their wives for the most spurious of reasons". This practice was later also denounced by Mary Wollstonecraft in The Wrongs of Woman (1798). On this point, Elizabeth Foyster claims that this "was an issue which caused much concern in eighteenth-century England". Men's right to confine their wives was frequently debated. In the essay At the Limits of Liberty: Married Women and Confinement in eighteenth-century England (2002), she argues that husbands' detention of their spouses in family dwellings and madhouses had become a new form of conjugal violence. Her study is based on documents of the King's Bench, the court which held jurisdiction over this issue.

=== Prevention of street robbery ===
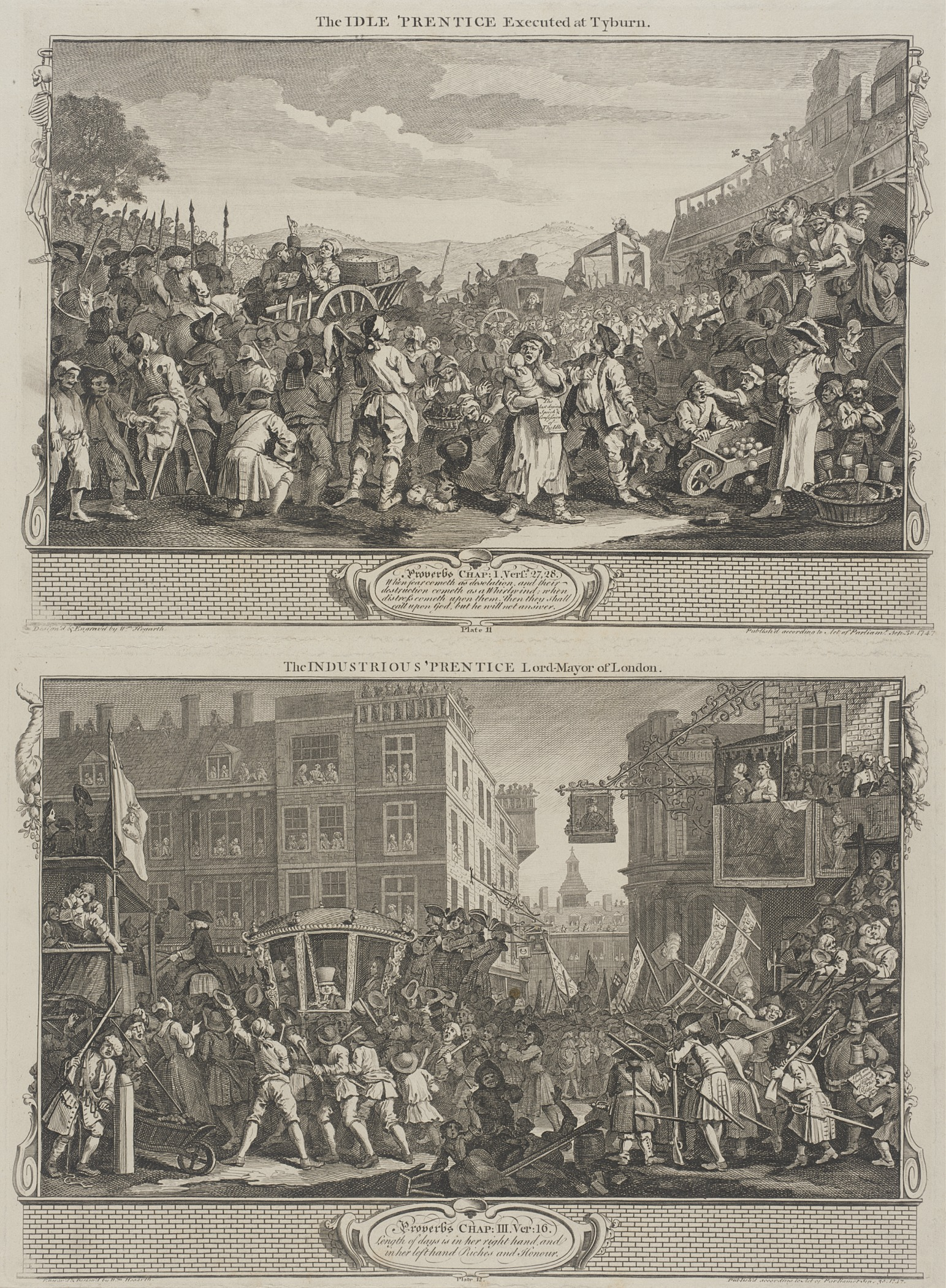
The Idle 'Prentice Executed at Tyburn - plate 11 and The Industrious 'Prentice Mayor of London - plate 12 in Industry and Idleness (1747) by William Hogarth

The last scheme of Andrew Moreton aims to prevent street robbery "first by heavenly, and then by earthly means". The former consist in "enforcing and encouraging a reformation of manners, by suppressing of vice and immorality, and punishing profaneness and licentiousness". Widespread immoral habits are the reading of lustful ballads, swearing, and alcohol abuse. The latter include the introduction of an efficient system of surveillance and lighting of the streets. First of all, it is necessary to substitute the current inept watch with a body of competent and physically strong men. These new guards should carry firearms, swords, and a horn to alert their co-workers. They should be assigned to areas which are not too large to be effectively monitored. In particular, "no watchman" should "stand above twenty doors distant from his fellow". Moreover, they ought to be given salaries in recognition of their efforts. Secondly, streets need to be rendered visible a night. Therefore, it is important to set up a reasonable number of lamps which are technically capable of providing adequate lighting.

In this section, Andrew Moreton recalls three peculiar aspects of the culture in Defoe's time. The first to be mentioned is the movement for the reformation of manners. Throughout the 18th-century, large numbers of Englishmen denounced what they saw as the high degree of social immorality and the difficulty of prosecuting victimless offences. From 1690 on they gathered and founded a series of societies. During the early decades they concentrated on organising and conducting the prosecution of targeted sinners. They could take you to court for offences such as drunkenness, swearing, gaming and sodomy. Later their members shifted their attention to teaching religious and moral values through the delivery of sermons and the production and distribution of pamphlets.

The second cultural peculiarity is the night watch which existed since the 13th century. It consisted of men monitoring the streets during dark hours. It had been introduced to favour safety at night together with the enforcement of rules of curfew. Early criticism about this system date back to the Restoration. Some of its shortcomings were also reported in the city marshals' accounts of the 1690s. They noticed that poor areas could not afford financing this service. Moreover, watchmen would not carry appropriate weapons and, in some cases, would leave before shift ended. In the 1720s, a significant public debate over crime prevention was ongoing and Defoe participated to it through a series of pamphlets. In addition to Augusta Triumphans, he investigated crime in Some Considerations Upon Street Walkers (1726), Street Robbery Consider'd (1728), Second Thoughts Are Best (1729), and An Effectual Scheme for the Immediate Preventing of Street Robberies (1731).

Lastly, Andrew Moreton deals with street lighting in connection with night watch. As J. M. Beattie explains, several changes were made to the urban environment of London for the purpose of improving aspects such as paving and the availability of drinkable water. Plans were also made to improve street lighting which, compared to other issues, was considered of the utmost importance to prevent crime. By rendering places visible to both pedestrians and part-time officers, life was made difficult for felons and this point was highlighted in petitions to Parliament. Street lighting eventually became a public system in the City of London through the London Street Lighting Act 1735 (9 Geo. 2. c. 20). It was financed by taxes and provided by private companies.

== See also ==
- The Great Law of Subordination Consider'd (1724) by Daniel Defoe
- Every-body's Business, Is No-body's Business (1725) by Daniel Defoe
- The Protestant Monastery (1726) by Daniel Defoe
- Some Considerations upon Street-walkers (1726) by Daniel Defoe
- Parochial Tyranny (1727) by Daniel Defoe
- Second Thoughts are Best (1729) by Daniel Defoe
- The Apprentice's Vade Mecum (1733) by Samuel Richardson
- An Inquiry into the Causes of the Late Increase of Robbers (1751) by Henry Fielding
- The Beggar's Opera (1728) by John Gay
- Industry and Idleness (1747) by William Hogarth
- University of London
- Thomas Coram's Foundling Hospital

== Bibliography ==
- Backscheider P.R. (1989), Daniel Defoe: His Life, Baltimore: Johns Hopkins University Press.
- Beattie J.M. (2001), Policing and punishment in London 1660–1750, Urban Crimes and the Limits of Terror, Oxford: Oxford University Press.
- Defoe, D. (2015), Augusta Triumphans, United States of America: Jefferson Publication.
- Defoe, D. (1887), An Essay Upon Projects, London, Paris, New York & Melbourne: Cassell & Company, retrieved 25 October 2015, <http://www.gutenberg.org/ebooks/4087>
- "18th Century Opera" (2015), Victoria and Albert Museum, retrieved 30 October 2015, <http://www.vam.ac.uk/content/articles/0-9/18th-century-opera/>
- "Social Projects" (2008), Daniel Defoe. The Collection of the Lily Library, Indiana University Bloomington, retrieved 25 October 2015, <http://www.indiana.edu/~liblilly/defoe/projects.html>
- Foyster, E. (2002), "At the Limits of Liberty: married women and confinement in eighteenth-century England",Continuity and Change, vol. 17, no. 1, pp. 39–62, retrieved 25 October 2015 Cambridge Journals,<http://journals.cambridge.org/action/login>
- George, M. D. (1979), London Life in the Eighteenth Century, Great Britain: Penguin Books.
- Hervey, N (1986). "Advocacy or Folly: The Alleged Lunatics' Friend Society, 1845-63". Medical History. 30 (3): 245–275. doi:10.1017/s0025727300045701. PMC 1139650. PMID 3523075.
- Hitchcock T. and Shoemaker R. (2006), Tales from the Hanging Court, London: Bloomsbury,
- Maldonado, T. (2002), "Defoe and the 'Projecting Age'",MIT Press, vol. 18, no. 1, pp. 78–85 JSTOR 1512032
- Novak M. E. (2001), Daniel Defoe, Masters of Fiction: His Life and Ideas, Oxford: Oxford University Press,
- Reformation of Manners Campaign(2012), Londonlives.org, Londonlives, retrieved 5 November 2015, <http://www.londonlives.org/static/Reformation.jsp>
- Richetti, J. (2008), The Cambridge Companion to Daniel Defoe, Cambridge University Press, New York.
- Williams, A. N. (2004). "Child Adoption in the Seventeenth Century: Vignettes from Defoe and Pepys". Journal of the Royal Society of Medicine. 97 (1): 37–38. doi:10.1177/014107680409700116. PMC 1079270. PMID 14702369.
