= Robert Payne (agriculturalist) =

Former English planter and colonial agent in Ireland

Robert Payne (d. 1593) was an English planter who settled in Munster, Ireland and became an advocate of the plantations of Munster.

Payne was a projector who started promoting schemes in Nottinghamshire for the production of Jersey wool for stockings and woad as a dye. In this he had the backing of Francis Willoughby.

For his Munster venture, he recruited 25 business partners in his project, each of whom received 400 acres. He was accompanied by five farmers, fourteen freeholders, forty copyholders and twenty five cottagers and labourers. He took 1,600 acres for himself and his family and also managed the estates of absentee landowners. Payne maintained his connection with Willoughby whilst in Ireland. Willoughby was a sleeping partner in a project aimed at establishing an ironworks in Kinalmeaky, to be run by an English ironmaster and using woods which Willoughby had already bought nearby.

In 1590 he was appointed the agent of Phane Becher, a London businessman who was an undertaker for Munster. However, when Becher arrived in Kinalmeaky he discovered faulty accounts and other misconduct and sacked Payne and took a suit out against Payne, which led to him being put in the Tower of London in 1592. He died the following year.

== A Briefe Description of Ireland ==
Payne published A Briefe Description of Ireland in 1589, in which he argued that the Irish soil was more fertile and the local Irish very loyal. As the title echos the tract by Thomas Harriot, A Briefe and True Report of the New Found Land of Virginia published a year previously, this indicates a rivalry between Virginia and Ireland in finding potential colonists. Writing shortly after the Second Desmond Rebellion, he puts the Irish in a good light saying that they should be "judge[d] charitably, for such was the misery of the time that many were driven to this bad choice, whether they would be spoiled as well by the enemy as the worser sort of soldiers at home, or go out to the rebels and be hanged, which is the fairest end of a traitor." The pamphlet was composed of letter he had written to his 25 partners, primarily living in Nottinghamshire.
