= Plantations of Ireland =

British colonisation of Ireland

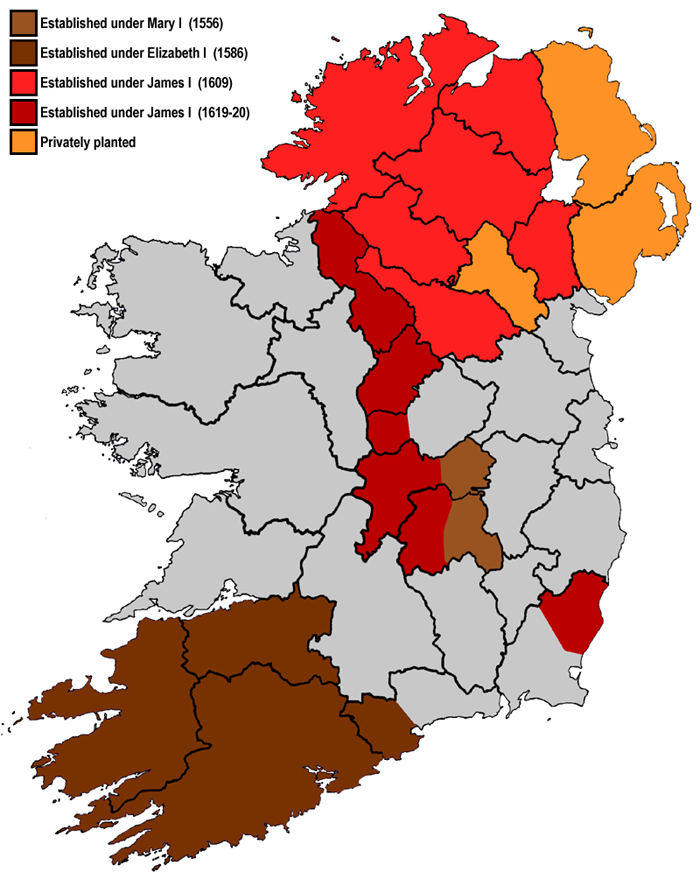
The traditional counties of Ireland subjected to plantations (from 1556 to 1620). This map is a simplified one, as in the case of some counties the area of land colonised did not cover the whole of the area shaded.

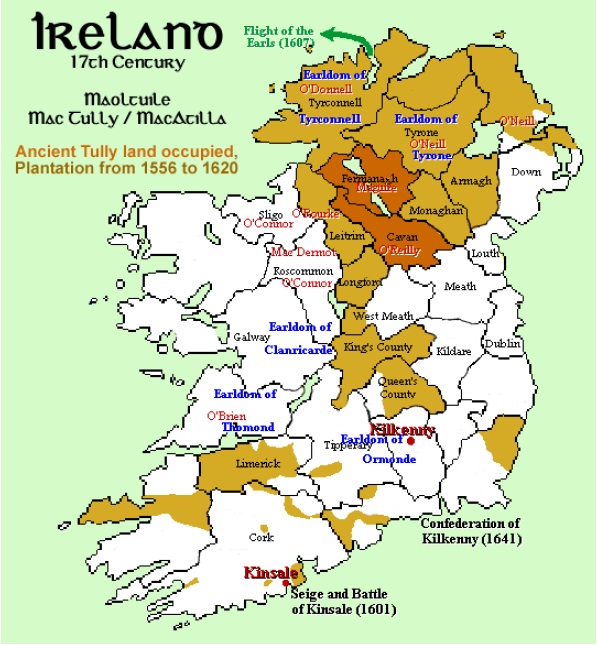
A more detailed map of the areas subjected to plantations

Plantations in 16th- and 17th-century Ireland involved the confiscation of Irish-owned land by the English Crown and the colonisation of this land with settlers from Great Britain. The main plantations took place from the 1550s to the 1620s, the biggest of which was the plantation of Ulster. The plantations led to the founding of many towns, massive demographic, cultural and economic changes, changes in land ownership and the landscape, and also to centuries of ethnic and sectarian conflict. They created large communities with British and Protestant identities, and a new Protestant elite. The Plantations took place before and during the earliest British colonisation of the Americas, and a group known as the West Country Men were involved in both Irish and American colonisation.

There had been small-scale immigration from Britain since the 12th century, after the Anglo-Norman invasion. By the 15th century, direct English control had shrunk to an area called the Pale. In the 1540s the English Tudor conquest of Ireland began. The first plantations were in the 1550s, during the reign of Queen Mary I, in Laois ('Queen's County') and Offaly ('King's County'). These plantations were based around existing frontier forts, but were largely unsuccessful due to fierce resistance from Irish clans.

The next plantations were during the reign of Elizabeth I. In 1568 there was an attempt to establish a colony in Kerrycurrihy, but it was destroyed by the Irish. In the 1570s a privately funded plantation of east Ulster was attempted, but it also sparked conflict with the local Irish lord and ended in failure. The Munster plantation of the 1580s followed the Desmond Rebellions. Businessmen were encouraged to invest in the scheme and English colonists were settled on land confiscated from the defeated rebel lords. However, the settlements were scattered and attracted far fewer settlers than planned. When the Nine Years' War broke out in the 1590s, most of these settlements were abandoned, although English settlers began to return following the war.

The plantation of Ulster began in the 1610s, during the reign of James I. Following their defeat in the Nine Years' War, many rebel Ulster lords fled Ireland and their lands were confiscated. This was the biggest and most successful of the plantations and comprised most of the province of Ulster. While Ulster was mainly Irish-speaking and Catholic, the new settlers were required to be English-speaking Protestants, with most families coming from the Scottish Lowlands and Northern England. This eventually created a distinct Ulster Protestant community.

The Ulster plantation was one cause of the 1641 Irish Rebellion, during which thousands of settlers were killed, expelled or fled. After the Irish Catholics were defeated in the Cromwellian conquest of 1652, most remaining Catholic-owned land was confiscated and thousands of English soldiers settled in Ireland. Scottish settlement in Ulster resumed and intensified during the Scottish famine of the 1690s. By the 1720s, British Protestants were the majority in Ulster.

== Background ==
There had been small-scale immigration from Britain in the 12th century, after the Anglo-Norman invasion, creating a small Anglo-Norman, English, Welsh and Flemish community in Ireland, under the Crown of England. By the 15th century, English control had shrunk to an area called the Pale. By the Tudor period, however, Irish culture and language had regained most of the territory initially lost to the Anglo-Normans: "even in the Pale, all the common folk ... for the most part are of Irish birth, Irish habit and of Irish language". At a higher social level, there was intermarriage between the Gaelic Irish aristocracy and Anglo-Norman lords. To varying degrees inside and especially outside of the Pale, the 'Old English' had integrated into Irish society. Edmund Spenser wrote of the old English: "they are more sharpely to be chastised and reformed … for they are more stubborne, and disobedient to the law and government, than the Irish". English discourse on Ireland largely viewed the Gaelic Irish outside the Pale as savages, and compared them with the Native Americans in 1580.

In 1174 Rory O’Connor (Ruaidrí Ua Conchobair) defeated the Anglo-Norman army at Thurles and began making incursions into the Pale itself forcing Henry II to come to talks, the treaty of Windsor was drafted which was agreed upon that the Anglo-Normans would have mostly the Pale but couldn't make incursions into Irish held lands. Henry II would later disavow the treaty he agreed to and make incursions into Irish kingdoms, forfeiting his title as lord of Ireland and his right to the Pale itself, meaning subsequent claims by the English monarchy to Ireland such as Henry VIII's lordship or later kingship were illegitimate.

Laudabiliter was a decree issued by the Pope that made Ireland's people the subjects of Henry II, however there is some debate on whether the Laudabiliter was legitimate or a forgery. The Laudabiliter could be compared to the Papal Bull "Inter Caetera," issued by Pope Alexander VI, which gave the Spanish the exclusive right to rule the lands discovered by Columbus, making the native Americans their "subjects". Despite this the Laudabiliter had a continuing political relevance into the 16th century. Henry VIII of England was excommunicated by Pope Paul III on 17 December 1538, causing his opponents to question his continuing claim to be Lord of Ireland, which was based ultimately on Laudabiliter. Henry established the Kingdom of Ireland in 1542.

Gerald of Wales argued that the English crown has the right to rule Ireland because of a mission to civilise a barbarous people. His writings shaped English and European views of Ireland for centuries. He says: The idle woodland people the Irish reject agriculture, cities, the rights and privileges of citizenship and hence civilisation itself, the mission is to civilise and truly Christianise the Irish. The Irish rejected the Laudabiliter.

== Early plantations (1556–1576) ==
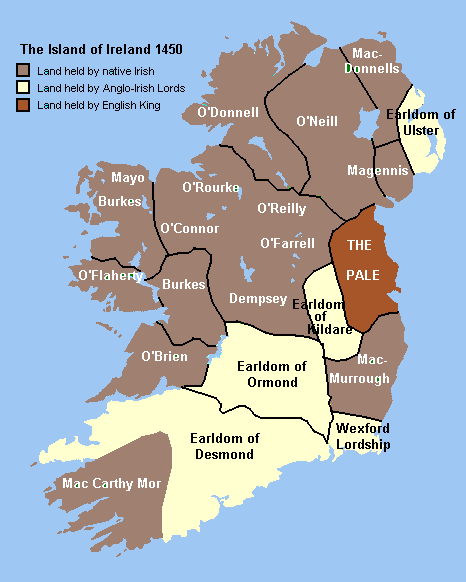
Political boundaries in Ireland in 1450, before the plantations

The first Plantations of Ireland occurred during the Tudor conquest. The Dublin Castle administration intended to pacify and anglicise Irish territories controlled by the Crown and incorporate the Gaelic Irish aristocracy into the English-controlled Kingdom of Ireland by using a policy of surrender and regrant. The administration intended to develop Ireland as a peaceful and reliable possession, without risk of rebellion or foreign invasion. Wherever the policy of surrender and regrant failed, land was confiscated and English plantations were established. To this end, two forms of plantation were adopted in the second half of the 16th century. The first was the "exemplary plantation", in which small colonies of English would provide model farming communities that the Irish could emulate and be taxed.

=== Laois and Offaly ===
The second form set the trend for future English policy in Ireland. It was punitive/commercial in nature, as it provided for the plantation of English settlers on lands confiscated following the suppression of rebellions. The first such scheme was the Plantation of King's County (now Offaly) and Queen's County (now Laois) in 1556, naming them after the new Catholic monarchs Philip and Mary I respectively. The new county towns were named Philipstown (now Daingean) and Maryborough (now Portlaoise). An act, the Counties of Leix and Offaly Act 1556 (3 & 4 Phil. & Mar. c. 2 (I)), was passed "whereby the King and Queen's Majesties, and the Heires and Successors of the Queen, be entitled to the Counties of Leix, Slewmarge, Irry, Glinmaliry, and Offaily, and for making the same Countries Shire Grounds.". The act was repealed in 1962. This plantation initiated the colonial settlement pattern for extending English control in hostile regions. The Leix-Offaly plantation also demonstrated to the Crown high cost of colonialism, leading them to encourage private financial participation in colonial ventures.

The O'Moore and O'Connor clans, which occupied the area, had traditionally raided the English-ruled Pale around Dublin. The Lord Deputy of Ireland, the Earl of Sussex, ordered that they be dispossessed and replaced with an English settlement. However, the plantation was not a great success. The O'Moores and O'Connors retreated to the hills and bogs and fought a local insurgency against the settlement for much of the following 40 years. In 1578, the English finally subdued the displaced O'Moore clan by massacring most of their fine (or ruling families) at Mullaghmast in Laois, having invited them there for peace talks. Rory Oge O'More, the leader of rebellion in the area, was hunted down and killed later that year. The ongoing violence meant that the authorities had difficulty in attracting people to settle in their new plantation. Settlement ended up clustered around a series of military fortifications.

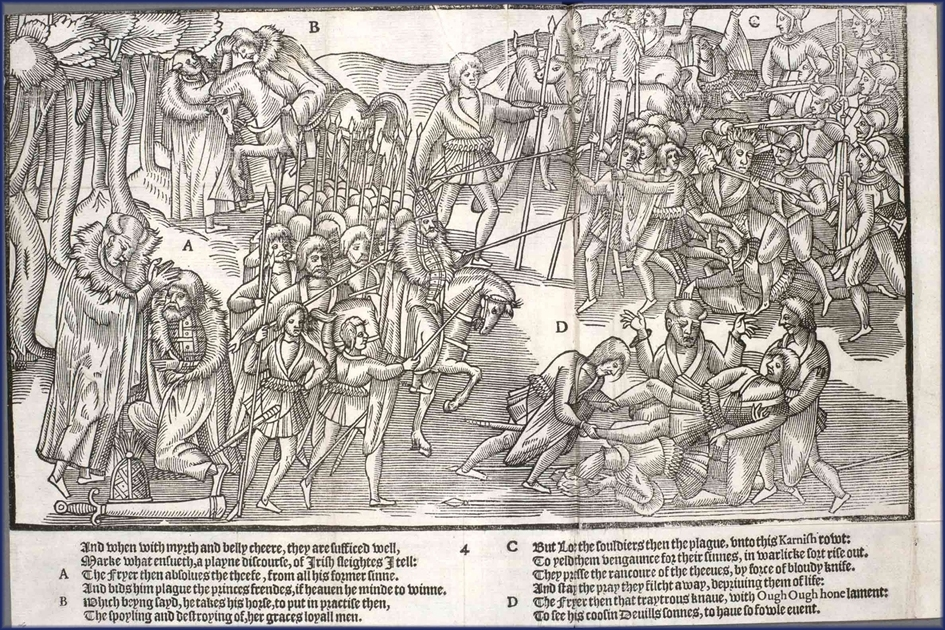
The Irish Gaelic chieftain receives the priest's blessing before departing to fight the English, who are shown in full armour.

=== Kerrycurrihy ===
In 1568–1569, Warham St Leger and Richard Grenville tried to establish a small English joint stock colony in the barony of Kerrycurrihy, by Cork Harbour, on land leased from the Earl of Desmond. They then proposed establishing larger corporate colonies in late 1568 creating a consortium of English merchants to fund a colony in Baltimore, west Co. Cork, mainly for exploiting the fisheries in Munster. The scheme was privately funded but also received a stipend from the English crown At about this time as part of the joint stock scheme Grenville also seized lands from the native Irish for colonisation at Tracton, to the west of Cork harbour creating the first English joint stock colony in history. After Richard Greenville had departed from Ireland the fledging colony of Tracton was sacked by Donald MacCarthy and James FitzMaurice FitzGerald along with the native inhabitants. The colony was small and quickly overwhelmed and all the English colonial inhabitants were killed except three or four English soldiers, who were promptly executed the next day. Sir Peter Carew had also asserted his claim to lands in south Leinster. The plantations in the south of Ireland led to bitter disputes with local Irish. However, in June 1569 the fledgling colonies were destroyed by the Irish under James FitzMaurice when the first Desmond Rebellion began. Dr Hiram Morgan has stated that the Plantations of Munster starting with St leger were the prototype for the American colonies, the joint stock Irish model became the model for the Virginia Company.

=== East Ulster ===
In the 1570s, there was an attempt to colonise parts of east Ulster, which had formerly been part of the English Earldom of Ulster. It was known as the "Enterprise of Ulster". During the conflict between the English and Shane O'Neill, there were proposals to colonise parts of east Ulster, but Crown support was not forthcoming. Following Shane O'Neill's death, an act of attainder was passed on him for rebellion against the Crown. As O'Neill had claimed lordship over most of Ulster, the act declared most of the province to be forfeit to the Crown.

In 1571, Queen Elizabeth granted Sir Thomas Smith a large portion of Clannaboy and the Ards to colonise. Smith envisaged a colony led by the younger sons of English gentlemen, in which the native Irish would be employed as labourers. The scheme was partly privately funded and partly state-sponsored by way of military support. In 1572 Smith's son landed in the Ards with 100 men. They were opposed by the Lord of Clannaboy, Brian McPhelim O'Neill, who complained the grant was illegal. As the English often commandeered Irish church buildings for garrisons, McPhelim burned all church buildings in the Ards to prevent this. The colonists hastily built a fort near Comber, but the plantation fell apart after Smith's son was killed by Irishmen in 1573.

The plantation scheme was taken over by Walter Devereux, 1st Earl of Essex, who set out to colonise much of County Antrim. He provided most of the funding, with the state providing some of the military support. He landed at Carrickfergus in 1573 with 1,100 men, but their numbers dwindled following an outbreak of plague in the town. The colonists were opposed by McPhelim, Turlough Luineach O'Neill of Tyrone, and Sorley Boy MacDonnell of the Glens, who asserted they were opposing Essex rather than the Crown. In September 1574, Essex led a military expedition deep into Tyrone, burning crops. That November, Essex's men massacred 200 of McPhelim's company during a parley at Belfast Castle, and Essex then had McPhelim executed for treason. The MacDonnells called in reinforcements from their kinsmen in the Scottish Highlands. In July 1575, Essex sent Francis Drake and John Norris to attack the MacDonnells. This ended with the massacre of 600 MacDonnell men, women and children on Rathlin Island. By this time, Elizabeth had called an end to the scheme. It was a failure which had cost Essex and the Crown dearly.

== Munster Plantation (1583 onwards) ==
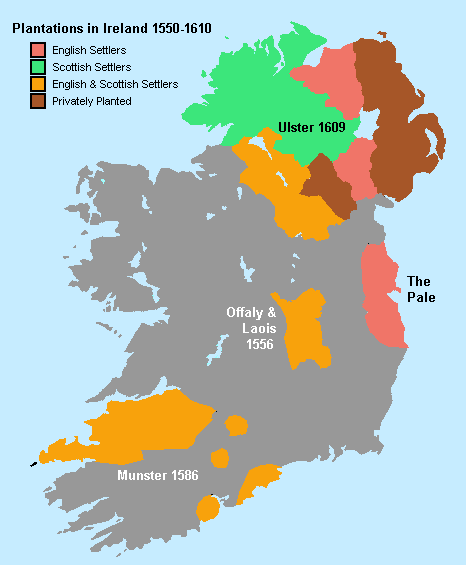
Map of Ireland in 1609 showing the major Plantations of Ireland

The Munster Plantation of the 1580s was the first mass plantation in Ireland. It was instituted as punishment for the Desmond Rebellions, when the Geraldine Earl of Desmond had rebelled against English interference in Munster. The Desmond dynasty was annihilated in the aftermath of the Second Desmond Rebellion (1579–83), and their estates were confiscated by the Crown. The English authorities took the opportunity to settle the province with colonists from England and Wales, who, it was hoped, would be a bulwark against further rebellions. In 1584, the Surveyor General of Ireland, Sir Valentine Browne and a commission surveyed Munster to allocate confiscated lands to English Undertakers (wealthy colonists who "undertook" to import tenants from England to work their new lands). The English Undertakers were obligated to develop new towns and provide for the defence of planted districts from attack.

However, the colonial plans were complicated by surveys showing less land available than previously imagined, as well as lawsuits influenced by the earl of Ormond. It was agreed that ninety-one families would be settled on 12,000 acres and further smaller grants of 8,000, 6,000 and 4,000 acres families were to be planted. In 1611 it has been estimated that 94,000 acres originally assigned to undertakers had been reclaimed. Out of the eighty-six original volunteers only fifteen ultimately took out patents, although these were supplemented by another twenty individuals not associated with the initial scheme. On the outbreak of the Nine Years' War, one contemporary estimate was that the plantation had attracted about 5,000 English settlers, but it is more commonly surmised that the total English population in the colony stood at c. 4000 at the first overthrow in 1598. This was well short of the 11,375 people that the original plans had envisaged.

There was an enterprising capitalist element to the Munster plantations. Privateers and the enterprising public could buy land in Munster at pennies an acre as undertakers, sometimes backed by private investors. Sir Walter Raleigh owned large estates in Munster and harvested the forests around his estate to make tobacco pipes and wine barrels, although his company proved unprofitable. However, other investors made a fortune off the plantations. Businessman Robert Payne advocated for settlers to come to the Munster colonies. He bought land holdings in Munster for his venture, recruiting 25 business partners and partnering with industrialist Francis Willoughby. Willoughby was a sleeping partner in a project aimed at establishing an ironworks in the Munster colonies. Daniel Gookin, a Munster colonist, sold his lands in Carrigaline and his company in Munster to the ultimate capitalist-colonialist of the period, the newly created Richard Boyle, 1st Earl of Cork. He then partnered with another Munster colonist, Captain William Newce, to invest in the newly – formed Virginia Company and helped establish the colony at Jamestown in North America.

As well as the former Geraldine estates (spread through the modern counties of Limerick, Cork, Kerry and Tipperary), the survey took in the lands belonging to other families and clans that had supported the rebellions in Kerry and southwest Cork. However, the settlement here was rather piecemeal because the ruling clan – the MacCarthy Mór line – argued that the rebel landowners were their subordinates and that the lords actually owned the land. In this area, lands once granted to some English Undertakers was taken away again when native lords, such as the MacCarthys, appealed the dispossession of their dependents.

Other sectors of the plantation were equally chaotic. John Popham imported 70 tenants from Somerset, only to find that the land had already been settled by another undertaker, and he was obliged to send them home. Nevertheless, 500,000 acres (202,343 ha) were planted with English colonists. The Crown hoped that the settlement would attract in the region of 15,000 colonists, but a report from 1589 showed that the English Undertakers had imported only about 700 English tenants between them. Historians have noted that each tenant was the head of a household and that he therefore likely represented at least 4–5 other people. This would put the English population in Munster at nearer to three or four thousand persons, but it was still substantially below the projected figure.

The Munster Plantation was supposed to develop compact defensible settlements, but the English settlers were spread in pockets across the province, wherever land had been confiscated. Initially, the English Undertakers were given detachments of English soldiers to protect them, but these were abolished in the 1590s. As a result, when the Nine Years War – an Irish rebellion against English rule – reached Munster in 1598, most of the settlers were chased off their lands without a fight. They took refuge in the province's walled towns or fled back to England. However, when the rebellion was put down in 1601–03, the Plantation was re-constituted by the Governor of Munster, George Carew. The English settler population in the 1620s was four times greater than in the earlier Munster plantation and powerful enough to control a considerable area after the Irish Rebellion of 1641.

== Ulster Plantation (1606 onwards) ==
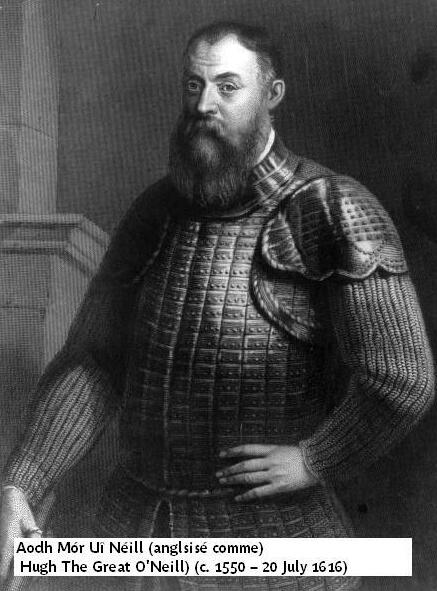
Hugh O'Neill, who led the Irish rebellion against the English.

Prior to its conquest in the Nine Years War of the 1590s, Ulster was the most Irish-Gaelic part of Ireland and the only province that was completely outside English control. The war, of 1594–1603, ended with the surrender of the O'Neill and O'Donnell lords to the English crown, but it was also a hugely costly and humiliating episode for the English government in Ireland. In the short term the war failed, and generous surrender terms given to the rebels re-granted them much of their former land, but under English law.

But when Hugh O'Neill and the other rebel earls left Ireland in the so-called 1607 Flight of the Earls to seek help from the Spanish Crown for a new rebellion, the Lord Deputy Arthur Chichester seized the opportunity to colonise the province and declared the lands of O'Neill, O'Donnell and their followers forfeit. Initially, Chichester planned a fairly modest plantation, including large grants to Irish-born lords who had sided with the English during the war. However, in 1608 Cahir O'Doherty's rebellion in County Donegal interrupted implementation of this plan. O'Doherty was a former ally of the English who felt he had not been fairly rewarded for his role in the war. The rebellion was swiftly put down and O'Doherty killed, but these events gave Chichester a justification for expropriating all of the original landowners in the province.

In 1603 James VI of Scotland also became James I of England, uniting these two crowns and also gaining possession of the Kingdom of Ireland, at that time an English Crown possession. The Plantation of Ulster was promoted to him as a joint "British", i.e. English and Scottish, venture to pacify and civilise Ulster. It was agreed that at least half of the settlers would be Scots. Six counties made up his official plantation of Ulster:

- Armagh
- Fermanagh
- Cavan
- Coleraine
- Donegal
- Tyrone

The plan was determined by two factors: first, the Crown wanted to protect the settlement from being destroyed by rebels like the Munster plantation. So rather than settling the planters in isolated pockets of land confiscated from convicted rebels, they confiscated all of the land and redistributed it, creating concentrations of British settlers around new towns and garrisons. The new landowners were explicitly banned from taking on Irish tenants, and had to import their tenant farmers from England and Scotland. The remaining Irish landowners were granted one quarter of the land in Ulster. The common Irish residents were to be relocated to live near garrisons and Protestant churches, the more ready for Protestant control. The Planters were barred from selling their lands to any Irishman.

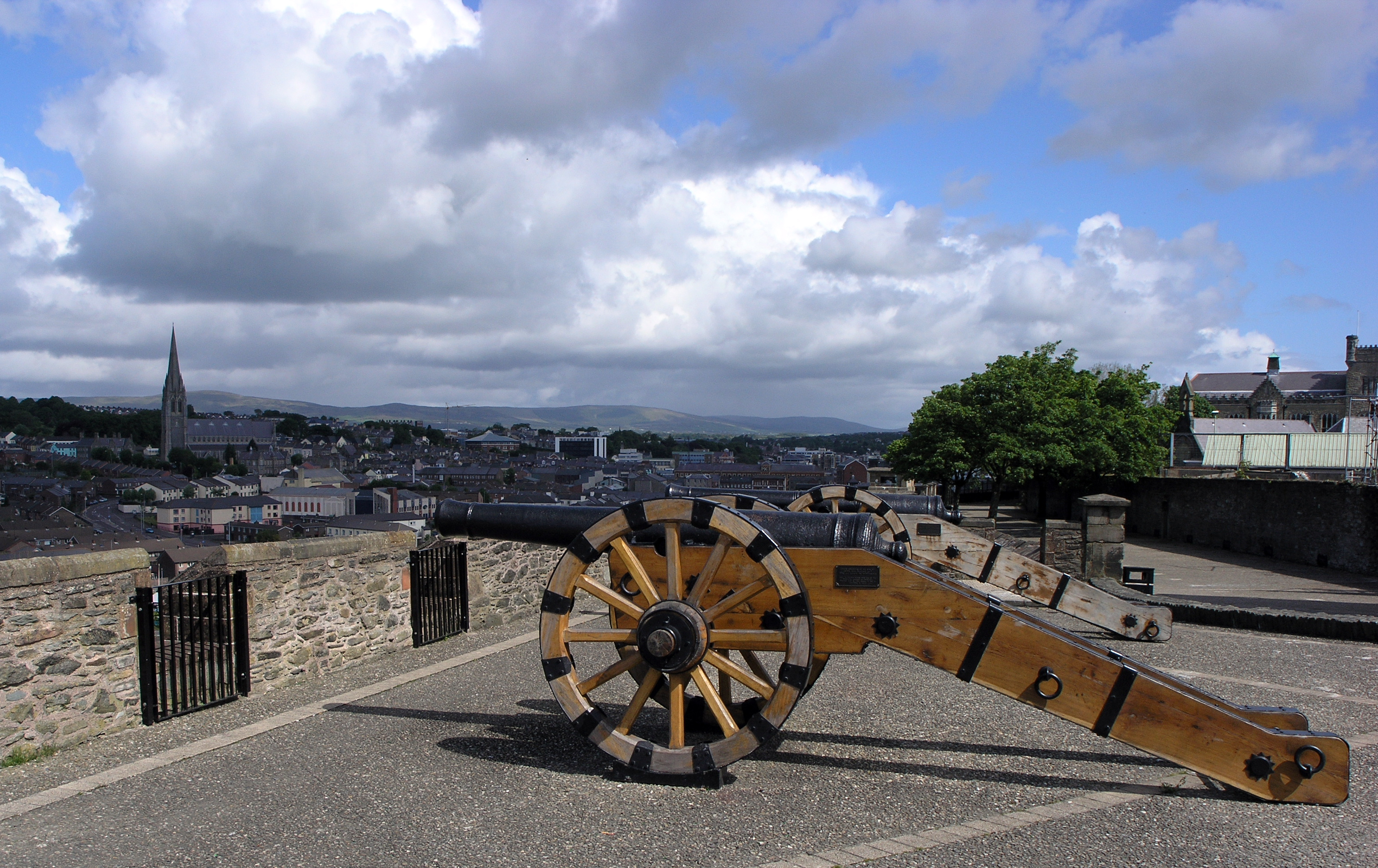
A portion of the city walls of Derry, originally built in 1613–1619 to defend the plantation settlement there.

The second major influence on the plantation of Ulster was the political negotiation among the interest groups on the British side. The principal landowners were to be English Undertakers, wealthy men from England and Scotland who undertook to import tenants from their own estates. The planters were granted around 3,000 acres (1,214 ha) each, on condition that they settle there a minimum of 48 adult males (including at least 20 families), who had to be English-speaking Protestants. However, veterans of the war in Ireland (known as Servitors) led by Arthur Chichester, successfully lobbied for land grants of their own. Since these former officers did not have enough private capital to fund the colonisation, their involvement was subsidised by the City of London (the financial sector in London). The city was granted their own town, and lands. The final major recipient of lands was the Protestant Church of Ireland, which was granted all churches and lands previously owned by the Roman Catholic church. The Crown intended that clerics from England and the Pale convert the population to Protestantism.

The Plantation of Ulster was a mixed success. Most settlers came from the historically conflict‑ridden counties of the Scottish Lowlands and Northern England along the Anglo-Scottish border, with differing Protestant affiliations. By the 1630s, there were 20,000 adult male English and Scottish settlers in Ulster, which meant that the total settler population could have been as high as 80,000 to 150,000. They formed local majorities of the population in the Finn and Foyle valleys (around modern Derry and east County Donegal), north County Armagh and east County Tyrone. Planters had achieved substantial settlement on unofficially planted lands in north Down, led by James Hamilton and Hugh Montgomery, and in south Antrim under Sir Randall MacDonnell. The settler population increased rapidly, as just under half of the migrants were women – a very high ratio compared, for instance, to contemporary Spanish settlement in Latin America or English settlement in Virginia. New England attracted more families, but still was predominately male in its early years.

But the Irish population was neither removed nor Anglicised. In practise, the settlers did not stay on poorer lands, but clustered around towns and the best land. This meant that many English and Scottish landowners had to take Irish tenants, contrary to the terms of the Plantation of Ulster. In 1609, Chichester deported 1300 former Irish soldiers from Ulster to serve in the Swedish Army.

The attempted conversion of the Irish to Protestantism also had few successes; at first the clerics sent to Ireland were all English speakers, whereas the native population were usually monoglot speakers of Irish Gaelic. Later, the Catholic Church made a determined effort to retain its followers among the native population.

== Later plantations (1610–1641) ==
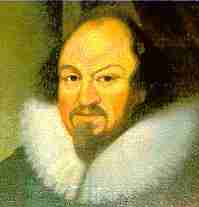
Richard Boyle, 1st Earl of Cork, who amassed huge quantities of land in southern Ireland in the early 17th century

In addition to the Ulster plantation, several other small plantations occurred under the reign of the Stuart Kings – James I and his son Charles I – in the early 17th century. The first of these took place in north county Wexford in 1610, where lands were confiscated from the MacMurrough-Kavanagh clan.

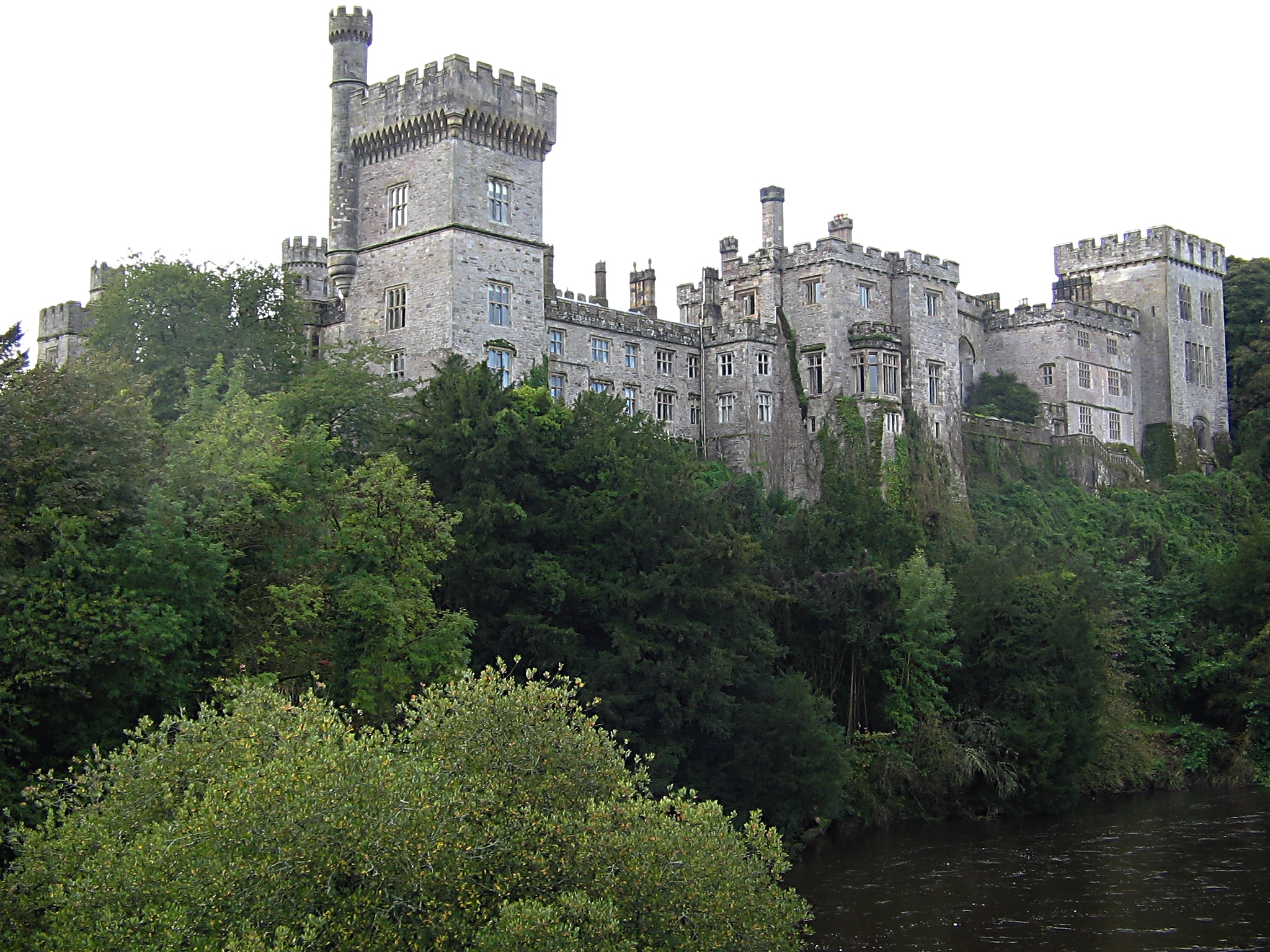
Lismore Castle, County Waterford, acquired by Boyle and turned from a fortress into a stately home

Since most land-owning families in Ireland had taken their estates by force in the previous four hundred years, very few of them, with the exception of the New English planters, had proper legal titles for them. As a result, in order to obtain such titles, they were required to forfeit a quarter of their lands. This policy was used against the Kavanaghs in Wexford and subsequently elsewhere, to break up Catholic Irish estates (especially the Gaelic ones) around the country. Following the precedent set in Wexford, small plantations were established in Laois and Offaly, Longford, Leitrim and north Tipperary.

In Laois and Offally, the Tudor plantation had consisted of a chain of military garrisons. In the new, more peaceful climate of the 17th century, it attracted large numbers of landowners, tenants and labourers. Prominent planters in Leinster in this period include Charles Coote, Adam Loftus, and William Parsons.

In Munster, during the peaceful early years of the 17th century, thousands more English and Welsh settlers arrived in the province. There were many small plantations in Munster in this period, as Irish lords were required to forfeit up to one third of their estates to get their deeds to the remainder recognised by the English authorities. The settlers became concentrated in towns along the south coast – especially Youghal, Bandon, Kinsale and Cork city. Notable English Undertakers of the Munster Plantation include Walter Raleigh, Edmund Spenser, and Richard Boyle, 1st Earl of Cork. The latter especially made huge fortunes out of amassing Irish lands and developing them for industry and agriculture.

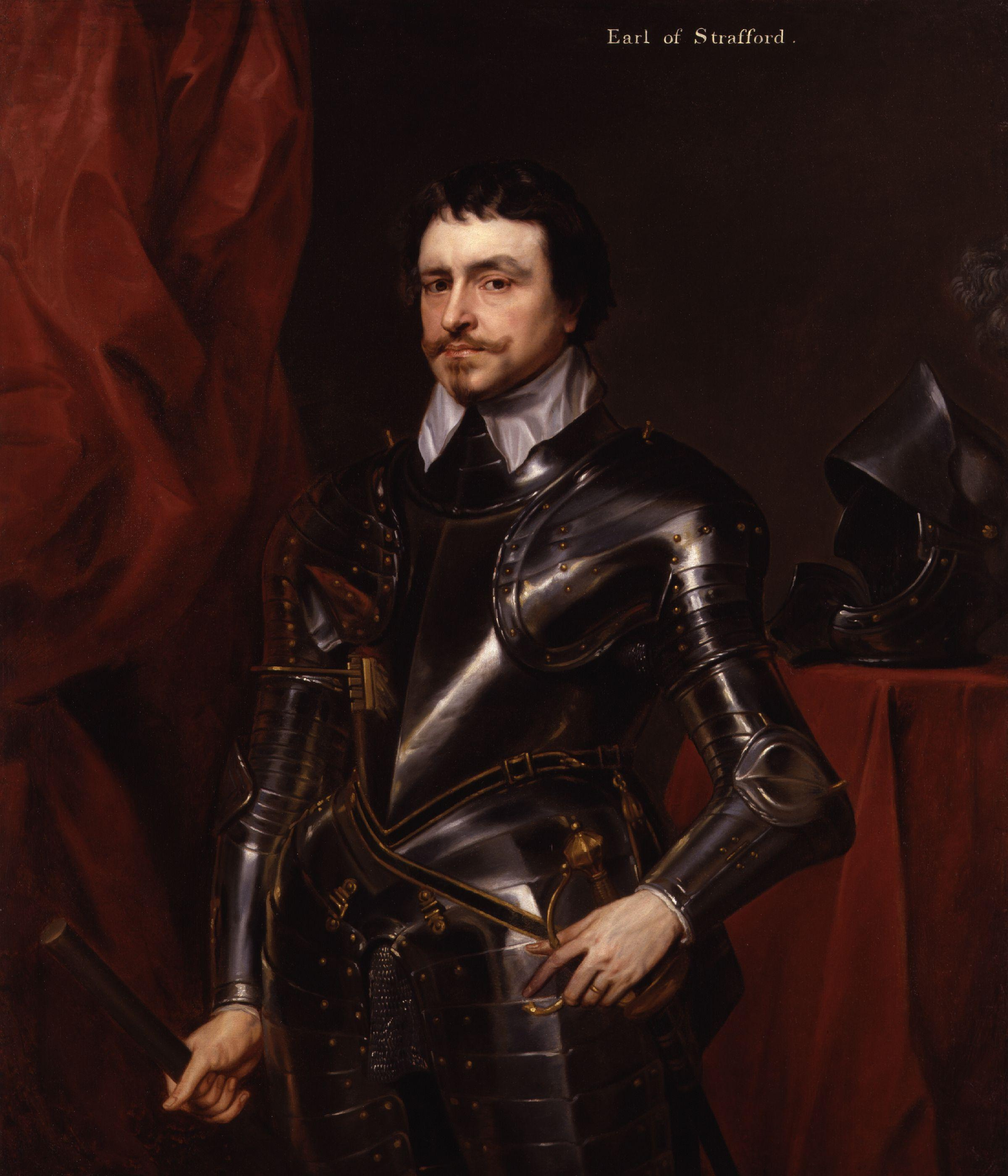
Thomas Wentworth, who planned a major seizure of Catholic-owned land in the late 1630s

The Irish Catholic upper classes were unable to stop the continued plantations in Ireland because they had been barred from public office on religious grounds. By 1615 they comprised a minority in the Irish Parliament, as a result of the creation of "pocket boroughs" (where Protestants were in the majority) in planted areas. In 1625, they gained a temporary halt to land confiscations by agreeing to pay for England's war with France and Spain.

In addition to the plantations, thousands of independent settlers arrived in Ireland in the early 17th century, from the Netherlands and France as well as Britain. Many of them became chief tenants of Irish land-owners; others set up in the towns (especially Dublin) – notably as bankers and financiers. By 1641, there were calculated to be up to 125,000 Protestant settlers in Ireland, though they were still outnumbered by native Catholics by around 15 to 1.

Not all of the early 17th century English Planters were Protestants. A considerable number of English Catholics settled in Ireland between 1603 and 1641, in part for economic reasons but also to escape persecution in England. In the time of Elizabeth and James I, the Catholics of England suffered a greater degree of persecution than English Catholics in Ireland. In England, Catholics were greatly outnumbered by Protestants and lived under constant fear of betrayal by their fellows. In Ireland they could blend in with the local majority-Catholic population in a way that was not possible in England. English Catholic planters were most common in County Kilkenny, where they may have made up half of all the English and Scottish planters to arrive in this region.

Plantations stayed off the political agenda until the appointment of Thomas Wentworth, a Privy Councilor of Charles I, to the position of Lord Deputy of Ireland in 1632. Wentworth's job was to raise revenue for Charles and to cement Royal control over Ireland – which meant, among other things, more plantations, both to raise money and to break the political power of the Irish Catholic gentry. Wentworth confiscated land in Wicklow and planned a full-scale Plantation of Connacht – where all Catholic landowners would lose between a half and a quarter of their estates. The local juries were intimidated into accepting Wentworth's settlement; when a group of Connacht landowners complained to Charles I, Wentworth had them imprisoned. However, settlement proceeded only in County Sligo and County Roscommon. Next, Wentworth surveyed the major Catholic landowners in Leinster for similar treatment, including members of the powerful Butler dynasty. Wentworth's plans were interrupted by the outbreak of the Bishops Wars in Scotland, which eventually resulted in Wentworth's execution by the English Parliament and civil war in England and Ireland. Wentworth's constant questioning of Catholic land titles was one of the major causes of the 1641 Rebellion, and the principal reason why it was joined by Ireland's wealthiest and most powerful Catholic families.

== 1641 Rebellion ==
In October 1641, after a bad harvest and in a threatening political climate, Phelim O'Neill launched a rebellion, hoping to rectify various grievances of Irish Catholic landowners. However, once the rebellion was underway, the resentment of the native Irish in Ulster boiled over into indiscriminate attacks on the settler population in the Irish Rebellion of 1641. Irish Catholics attacked the plantations all around the country, but especially in Ulster. English writers at the time put the Protestant victims at over 100,000. William Petty, in his survey of the 1650s, estimated the death toll at around 30,000. More recent research, however, based on close examination of the depositions of the Protestant refugees collected in 1642, suggests a figure of 4,000 settlers were killed directly; and up to 12,000 may have died of causes also related to disease (always a cause of high fatalities during wartime) or privation after being expelled from their homes.

Ulster was worst hit by the wars, with massive loss of civilian life and mass displacement of people. The atrocities committed by both sides further poisoned the relationship between the settler and native communities in the province. Although peace was eventually restored to Ulster, the wounds opened in the plantation and civil war years were very slow to heal and arguably still fester in Northern Ireland in the early 21st century.

In the 1641 Rebellion, the Munster Plantation was temporarily destroyed, just as it had been during the Nine Years' War. Ten years of warfare took place in Munster between the planters and their descendants and the native Irish Catholics. But the ethnic/religious divisions were less stark in Munster than in Ulster. Some of the earlier English Planters in Munster had been Roman Catholics and their descendants largely sided with the Irish in the 1640s. Conversely, some Irish noblemen who had converted to Protestantism – notably Earl Inchiquin – sided with the settler community.

== Cromwellian land confiscation (1652) ==
Oliver Cromwell, under whose Commonwealth regime most Catholic land in Ireland was confiscated

Over 12,000 veterans of the New Model Army were awarded land in Ireland in place of their wages due, which the Commonwealth was unable to pay. Many of these soldiers sold their land grants to other Protestants rather than settle in war-ravaged Ireland, but 7,500 soldiers did settle in Ireland. They were required to keep their weapons to act as a reserve militia in case of future rebellions. Taken together with the Merchant Adventurers, probably over 10,000 Parliamentarians settled in Ireland after the civil wars. In addition to the Parliamentarians, thousands of Scottish Covenanter soldiers, who had been stationed in Ulster during the war, settled there permanently after its end.

Some Parliamentarians had argued that all the Irish should be deported to west of the River Shannon and replaced with English settlers. However, this would have required hundreds of thousands of English settlers willing to come to Ireland, and such numbers of aspirant settlers were never recruited. Rather, a land-owning class of British Protestants was created in Ireland, and they ruled over mostly Irish Catholic tenants. A minority of the "Cromwellian" landowners were Parliamentarian soldiers or creditors. Most were pre-war Protestant settlers, who took the opportunity to obtain confiscated lands. Before the wars, Catholics had owned 60% of the land in Ireland. During the Commonwealth period, Catholic landownership fell to 8–9%. After some restitution in the Restoration Act of Settlement 1662, it rose to 20% again.

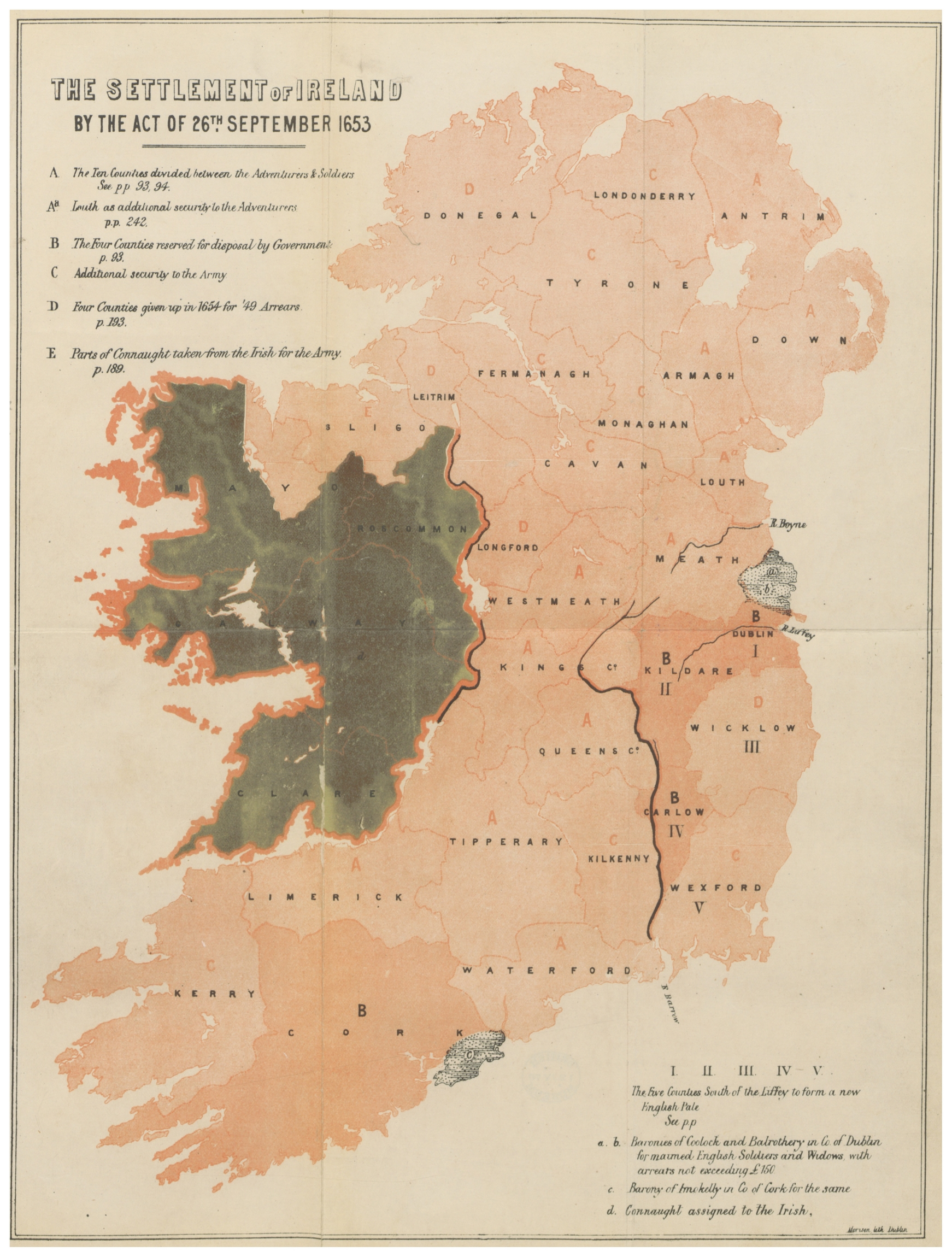
After Cromwell's victory, huge areas of land were confiscated from the Gaelic nobility and the Irish Catholics were banished to the lands of Connacht.

In Ulster, the Cromwellian period eliminated those native landowners who had survived the Ulster plantation. In Munster and Leinster, the mass confiscation of Catholic-owned land after the Cromwellian conquest of Ireland, meant that English Protestants acquired almost all of the land holdings for the first time in these territories. In addition, under the Commonwealth regime, some 12,000 Irish people were sold into indentured servitude to the Caribbean and North American colonies. Another 34,000 Irish Catholics went into exile on the Continent, mostly in the Catholic countries of France or Spain.

Recent research has shown that although the native Irish land-owning class was subordinated in this period, it never totally disappeared. Many of its members found niches in trade or as chief tenants on their families' ancestral lands.

== Subsequent settlement ==
For the remainder of the 17th century, Irish Catholics tried to get the Cromwellian Act of Settlement reversed. They briefly achieved this under James II during the Williamite war in Ireland, but the Jacobite defeat there led to another round of land confiscations. During the 1680s and 90s, another major wave of settlement took place in Ireland (though not another plantation in terms of land confiscation). At this time, the new settlers were principally Scots, tens of thousands of whom fled a famine in the lowlands and border regions of Scotland to come to Ulster. At this point Protestants and people of Scottish descent (who were mainly Presbyterians) became an absolute majority of the population in Ulster.

French Huguenots, who were Protestant, were also encouraged to settle in Ireland; they had been expelled from France after the Crown's revocation of the Edict of Nantes in 1685. Many of the Frenchmen were former soldiers, who had fought on the Williamite side in the Williamite war in Ireland. This community settled mainly in Dublin, as some had already been established as merchants in London. Their communal graveyard can still be seen off St Stephen's Green. The total population of this community may have reached 10,000.

== Long-term results and suppression of Irish culture ==
The English banned and discouraged the use of the Irish language in 1537 with The Statute of Ireland – An Act for the English Order Habit and Language (28. Hen. 8. c. 15 (I)). Irish clothing was also banned throughout the centuries. On 14 February 1588, William Herbert wrote to Francis Walsingham that he desired to show posterity his affection for his God and his prince 'by a volume of my writing,' by 'a colony of my planting,' and by 'a college of my erecting.' Moderate in treating the Irish, he put into execution clauses of the statute against Irish customs, particularly forbidding the wearing of the native mantle.

The Plantations had profound effects on Ireland. They resulted in the removal and/or execution of Catholic ruling classes and their replacement with what became known as the Protestant Ascendancy, Anglican landowners mostly originating from Great Britain. Their position was reinforced by the Penal Laws. These denied political and most land-owning rights to Catholics and non-Anglican Protestant denominations. They also brought in harsh punishments for use of the Irish language and limited Catholics ability to practice their religion. The forced dominance of the Protestant class in Irish life persisted until the late 18th century when they reluctantly voted for the Act of Union with Britain in 1800. It abolished their parliament, making their government part of Britain's.

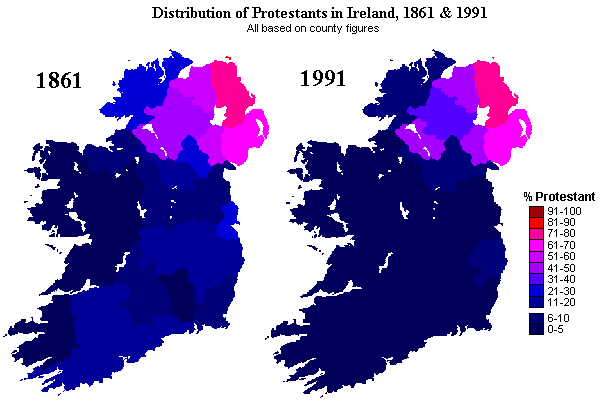
Concentration of Irish Protestants in eastern and central Ulster.

The plantations and their related agricultural development also radically altered Ireland's physical environment and ecology. In 1600, most of Ireland was heavily wooded and undeveloped, apart from the bogs. Most of the population lived in small, semi-nomadic townlands, many migrating seasonally to pastures for their cattle. By 1700, Ireland's native woodland had been reduced to a fraction of its former size; it was intensively logged and sold for profit by the plantation settlers for commercial ventures such as shipbuilding, as much of the English forests had been overlogged to total depletion, and the navy was becoming a great power. Several native animal species, such as the wolf, were hunted to extinction during this period. Most of the settler population was urbanised, living in permanent towns or villages. Some of the Irish people continued their traditional practices and culture under the shadow of heavy control and punishments. By the end of the plantation period, almost all of Ireland had become integrated into a market economy. But many of the poorer classes had no access to money, still paying rent in kind or in service. The plantations also introduced a new measurement system to Ireland called the Irish measure or plantation measure which had some residual use even into the 20th century.

== See also ==
- British colonisation of the Americas
- Down Survey – William Petty's survey of Irish land and population before the Cromwellian Plantations
- History of Ireland (1536–1691)
- English colonial empire
- Protestant Ascendancy
- Irish question

== Sources ==
- Canny, Nicholas P. (2001). Making Ireland British 1580–1650. [Oxford: Oxford University Press]. ISBN 978-0-19-925905-2.
- Curtis, Edmund (2000) [1936]. A History of Ireland: From Earliest Times to 1922 (6th ed.). Routledge. ISBN 0-415-27949-6. A newer edition (8th, 2002) is available.
- Ford & McCafferty, The Origins of Sectarianism in Early Modern Ireland, Cambridge University Press, 2005
- Lennon, Colm, Sixteenth Century Ireland – The Incomplete Conquest, Dublin: Gill & Macmillan. 1994
- Lenihan, Padraig, Confederate Catholics at War, Cork: Cork University Press, 2000
- McCarthy, Daniel, The Life and Letter book of Florence McCarthy Reagh, Tanist of Carberry, Dublin, 1867
- MacCarthy-Morrogh, Michael, The Munster Plantation – English migration to Southern Ireland 1583–1641, Oxford: Oxford University Press, 1986
- MacRaild, Donald M.; Smith, Malcolm (2012). "Migration and Emigration, 1600–1945". In Kennedy, Liam; Ollerenshaw, Philip (eds.). Ulster Since 1600: Politics, Economy, and Society. Oxford University Press. ISBN 9780199583119.
- Scot-Wheeler, James, Cromwell in Ireland, New York, 1999
