= Francis Willoughby (1547–1596) =

English industrialist and coalowner

Sir Francis Willoughby
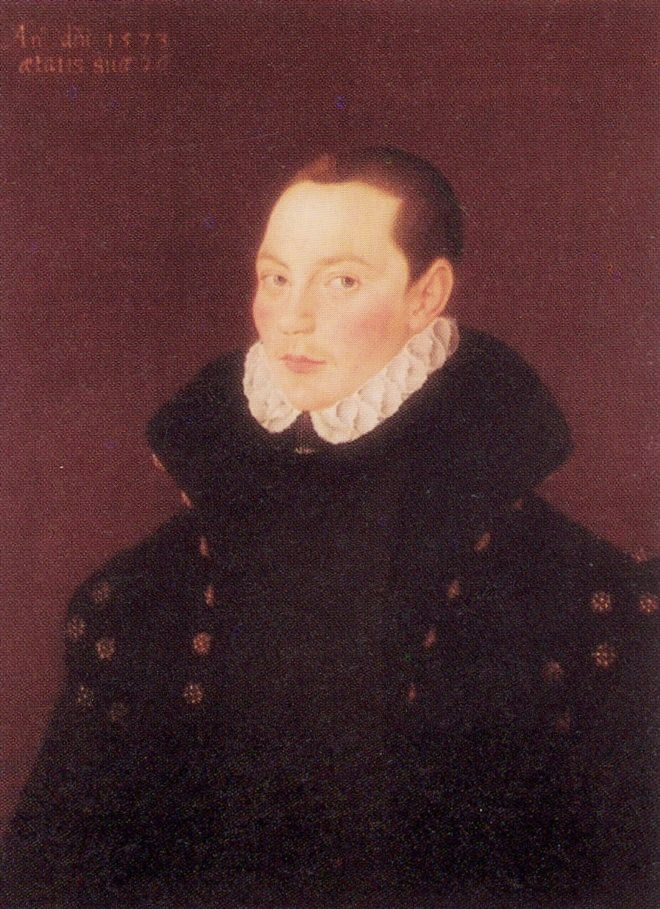
- Portrait of Sir Francis Willoughby, 1573 by George Gower
- Born: 1547; Woodlands, Dorset
- Died: 1596 (aged 48–49); London
- Buried: St Giles
- Spouse: Elizabeth Littleton
- Father: Sir Henry Willoughby
- Mother: Anne Grey

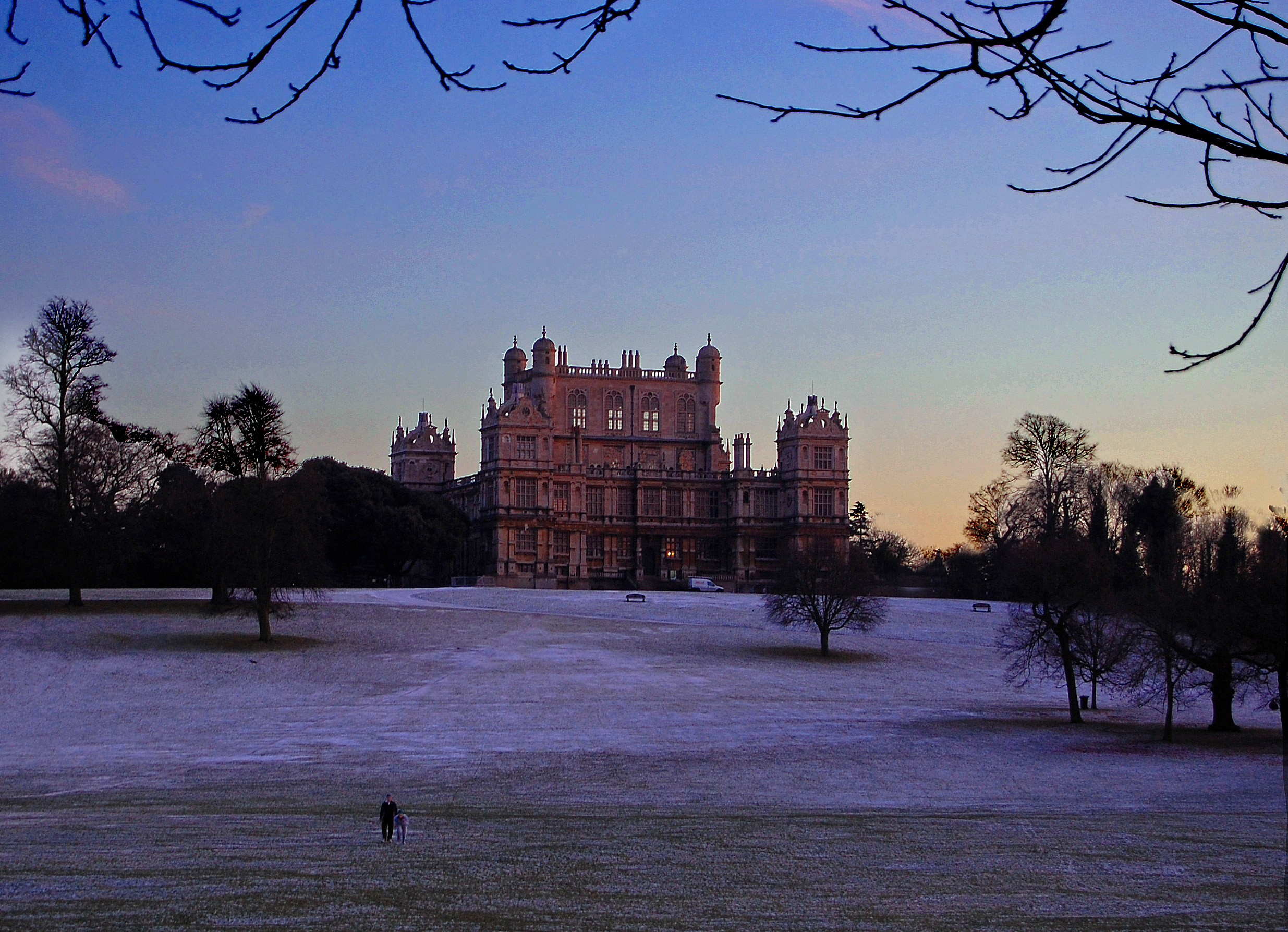
Wollaton Hall from the park

Sir Francis Willoughby (1546/7–1596) was an English industrialist and coalowner, who built Wollaton Hall in Nottinghamshire.

== Family ==
Francis Willoughby was the younger son of Sir Henry Willoughby (slain 27 August 1549 during Kett's Rebellion) of Wollaton, Nottinghamshire, and Anne Grey (d.1548), the daughter of Thomas Grey, 2nd Marquess of Dorset, by Margaret Wotton. He had an elder brother, Thomas (d.1559) and a sister, Margaret, who married Sir Matthew Arundell (c. 1533 – 24 December 1598) of Wardour Castle. Francis was thus the great-grandson of Sir Henry Willoughby (1451-1528), a Knight of the Body to both Kings Henry VII and Henry VIII. His great-grandmother, Cecily Bonville, 7th Baroness Harington, was the richest heiress in England, and his great-great-grandmother was Elizabeth Woodville, Queen of England.

At the age of seventeen, Francis married Elizabeth Littleton of Frankley, Worcestershire. This proved to be a turbulent marriage, and produced only daughters.

Portrait of Elizabeth Littleton, Lady Willoughby by George Gower (1573)

Francis Willoughby's father, Sir Henry Willoughby, had inherited Wollaton and other properties including 'lucrative coal pits' at the death of his uncle, Sir John Willoughby, on 10 January 1549. However, only a few months later, on 27 August 1549, Sir Henry Willoughby was slain on Mousehold Heath in the suppression of Kett's rebellion. Francis's elder brother, Thomas (d. 1559), then aged eight, became the ward of their mother's brother, Henry Grey, 3rd Marquess of Dorset, and came to live with Dorset and his wife, Frances Brandon, at Bradgate House, while Francis, then aged two, and his sister, Margaret, were put in the care of Dorset's half-brother, George Medley, the son of Dorset's mother, Margaret Wotton, by her first husband, William Medley. Dorset's ill-fated attempt to place his eldest daughter, Lady Jane Grey, on the throne eventually cost Lady Jane, Dorset, and Dorset's brother, Lord Thomas Grey, their heads, and brought other family members under suspicion. George Medley was arrested, and imprisoned in the Tower for a time, and when he was released in May 1554 was unable any longer to care for Francis and Margaret. Dorset's widow, Frances Brandon, arranged for Francis to be sent to school, and took Margaret under her care. Their elder brother, Thomas, became the ward of Sir William Paget, and was married to Paget's daughter, Dorothy.

In August 1559, Thomas Willoughby died from 'overheating' while out hunting, leaving no issue, and Francis inherited the family estates.

Willoughby developed coal mines on his estate at Wollaton in the 1560s and 1570s. This enabled him to maintain a lordly lifestyle, maintaining a number of gentleman retainers. He employed Robert Smythson, who had previously worked at Longleat to build him a mansion, Wollaton Hall.

By 1580, when his heir died aged six, he was separated from his wife. She offered to try for another heir, they remained separated and the queen arranged for her to have an allowance of £200 per year. He then decided to make his distant relative Percival Willoughby of Bore Place in Kent his principal heir, if he had no son, through marriage to his eldest daughter Bridget. This marriage took place in 1583, and several manors including Wollaton and Middleton, Warwickshire were settled on them in default of male issue.

Willoughby entered into a number of speculative ventures, including growing and processing woad at Wollaton, and a plantation in Ireland. In these he worked with the projector, Robert Payne.

These took capital, as did his ironworks, at Middleton, Oakamoor (Staffordshire), and Codnor. The latter was his in consequence of the debts of Sir John Zouche. These were profitable, but Willoughby was unable to pay his debts as well as providing dowries for his other daughters. He accordingly handed them over in 1595 to Percival, who took responsibility for £3000 of the debts. This was followed by the death of his wife, with whom he had been reconciled. Willoughby immediately married a widow, but died only fifteen months later, leaving his widow expecting another child, who turned out to be another daughter. Percival thus inherited the estate, but encumbered with many debts.
