= Andrew Moreton =

Pseudonym used by Daniel Defoe

Andrew Moreton is a pseudonym used by Daniel Defoe in several pamphlets published between 1725 and 1729, proposing some new reflections on themes already discussed in Defoe's 1697 An essay upon projects. Moreton is presented as a crotchety middle-class old gentleman complaining about the indecency of London social life in recent years. Fulfilling his duty as an honest and concerned citizen, Moreton firmly advances possible reforms in order to improve the quality of life of all social classes.

He soon became a controversial figure especially when parts of The Protestant Monastery were reissued in abridged form in other pamphlets such as: Chickens Feed Capons and No Fool like the Old Fool, and also rose protests from a family who believed themselves to have been described in the pamphlet. Moreton became so famous that even A System of Magick was attributed to him in order to boost sales. Defoe was quickly identified in 1725 by his opponents and subjected to personal attacks. Yet, he continued to use Andrew Moreton Esq. as a mask in the following writings.

== Pamphlets by Andrew Moreton ==
- Every-body’s Business, Is No-Body’s Business (1725)
- The Protestant Monastery (1726)
- Parochial Tyranny (1727)
- Augusta Triumphans (1728)
- Second Thoughts Are Best (1729)
