= The Great Law of Subordination Consider'd =

1724 pamphlet by Daniel Defoe

The Great Law of Subordination Consider'd; Or, the Insolence and Unsufferable Behaviour of SERVANTS in England Duly Enquired is a 1724 pamphlet by Daniel Defoe. Similarly to Every-body's Business, Is No-body's Business (1725), it focuses on issues related to servants. It also revises themes which its author had already dealt with in An Essay Upon Projects (1697).

== See also ==
- Every-body's Business, Is No-body's Business (1725) by Daniel Defoe

== Bibliography ==
Backscheider, P B, Daniel Defoe.His Life, The Johns Hopkins University Press, Baltimore and London, 1989.

“Social Projects”, Daniel Defoe. The Collection of the Lily Library, Indiana University Bloomington, 2008, retrieved 25 October 2015, <http://www.indiana.edu/~liblilly/defoe/projects.html>

George, M D, London Life in the Eighteenth Century, Penguin Books, Great Britain, 1979.

Maldonado, T, “Defoe and the ‘Projecting Age’”,MIT Press, vol. 18, no. 1, 2002, pp. 78-85, retrieved 20 October 2015, JSTOR, <https://www.jstor.org/stable/1512032>

Novak, M E, “Last Productive Years”,Daniel Defoe Master of Fictions. His Life and Ideas, Oxford University Press, United States of America, 2001.
