= Dalby Thomas =

English businessman and writer (c. 1650–1711)

Sir Dalby Thomas
- Born: c. 1650; England
- Died: c. 1711 (aged 60–61); Africa
- Occupations: Businessman and writer
- Known for: Advocated free trade in African slavery and governor of Cape Coast Castle
- Spouse: Lady Dorothy Thomas
- Children: Susanna Thomas

Dalby Thomas (c. 1650–1711) was an English businessman and writer. Thomas was a commissioner of the glass duty, which administered taxes on bottles, dishes, and other glassware. Daniel Defoe became an accountant for Dalby Thomas in the fall of 1695, through 1699. Dalby Thomas was knighted 1 August 1703 at Windsor Castle -- "of Essex and London, general, and chief director for the Royal Africa Company"

Sir Dalby was governor (Agent-general) of Cape Coast Castle, 1703-1711, the main British slave fort on the West African coast. He died in Africa, but his wife Lady Dorothy Thomas and daughter Susanna used family money to pay for a new vicarage at St Mary’s Church, Hampton and built a lavish tomb to Sir Dalby.

== Slave Trade ==
He wrote Historical Account of the Rise and Growth of the West-India Colonies and of the Great Advantages They Are to England, in Respect to Trade which was published in London in 1690. Here he advocated revoking the monopoly on trading in enslaved Africans, which at the time was enjoyed by the Royal African Company, arguing that free trade would lead to a reduction in the price of chattel slaves. Thomas called for the establishment of a great council of trade representing "every Plantation, Marritime, City, Company, Constitution and Trade, which would desire to send Members to it", which would draw up advisory documents for both Houses of Parliament.
