= Second Thoughts Are Best =

1729 book by Daniel Defoe

- Title page of the first edition of Second Thoughts Are Best (1729) by Andrew Moreton, alias Daniel Defoe
- Author: Daniel Defoe
- Original title: Second Thoughts Are Best: or, a Further Improvement of a Late Scheme to Prevent Street Robberies
- Language: English
- Genre: Pamphlet
- Publisher: W. Meadows
- Publication date: October 8, 1729; 297 years ago
- Publication place: United Kingdom

Second Thoughts Are Best: or, a Further Improvement of a Late Scheme to Prevent Street Robberies is a 1729 pamphlet by Daniel Defoe. He wrote it under the name of Andrew Moreton Esq., presented as a dissatisfied middle-class old man who was extremely concerned about the increase in criminality around the 1720s.

As in other essays, such as Every-body’s Business, Is No-Body’s Business (1725), The Protestant Monastery (1726), Parochial Tyranny (1727) and Augusta Triumphans (1728), Moreton here inquiries into a range of different social and moral issues: the increase in highway robberies, the inefficiency of the night watch, the wicked trade of gin shops, and the "infestation" of prostitutes, beggars, and vagrants throughout London. Moreton's declared intention is "to break up street-robbers, nest and egg", providing practical solutions for a reformation of the night watch, manners, places and even the theatre, reforms which would improve the quality of life.

Defoe was particularly inclined to use pseudonyms, acquiring in this way the reputation as one of the most chameleon-like English writers. These multiple personalities allowed him to freely express his opinions on London's social and moral qualities (not without an hint of criticizing humor), and at the same time to express a resolute sense of duty, felt to be an essential characteristic of the eighteenth-century English citizen.

== Preface ==
The pamphlet is dedicated to His Majesty, "the king of our hearts; the king of our wishes" George II and his Queen, Caroline, but copies were also presented to the Lords Spiritual, the House of Lords and the House of Commons. Defoe had a long-lasting admiration for the House of Hanover and his address to King George as "a king naturalized to us, a king who loves us, a king whose person as well as mind, the whole hero appears" recalls his past worship of King William III of England. Defoe's schemes and social projects were actually obtaining a warm widespread approval in this period.

In the preface Moreton goes beyond the complimentary introduction and pleas to be heard conventional in such pamphlets, but he skillfully turns it into an opportunity to make criticisms and level accusations. Firstly, he denounces the abuse of "the liberty of the press, that from a benefit it becomes an evil and demands immediate regulation". This probably refers to the anti-Walpole journal The Craftsman, accused of turning an instructive and effective means of communication into an instrument used to achieve personal interests and even spread slander and scandal. Secondly, Moreton expresses his indignation concerning the anonymous gentleman author of Discovery to Prevent Street Robberies, whom he accuses of having copied and even made money out of the schemes he had presented in his earlier pamphlet, Augusta Triumphans. Describing Second Thoughts as an amended and enlarged version of his previous plan for the City of London, Moreton is eager to stress that his proposals are "humbly offered for the public welfare", nevertheless he will "stand prepared for the sneers of those who despite everything and everybody but their dear selves".

== The Watch ==
=== "Decrepit, Superannuated Wretches" ===
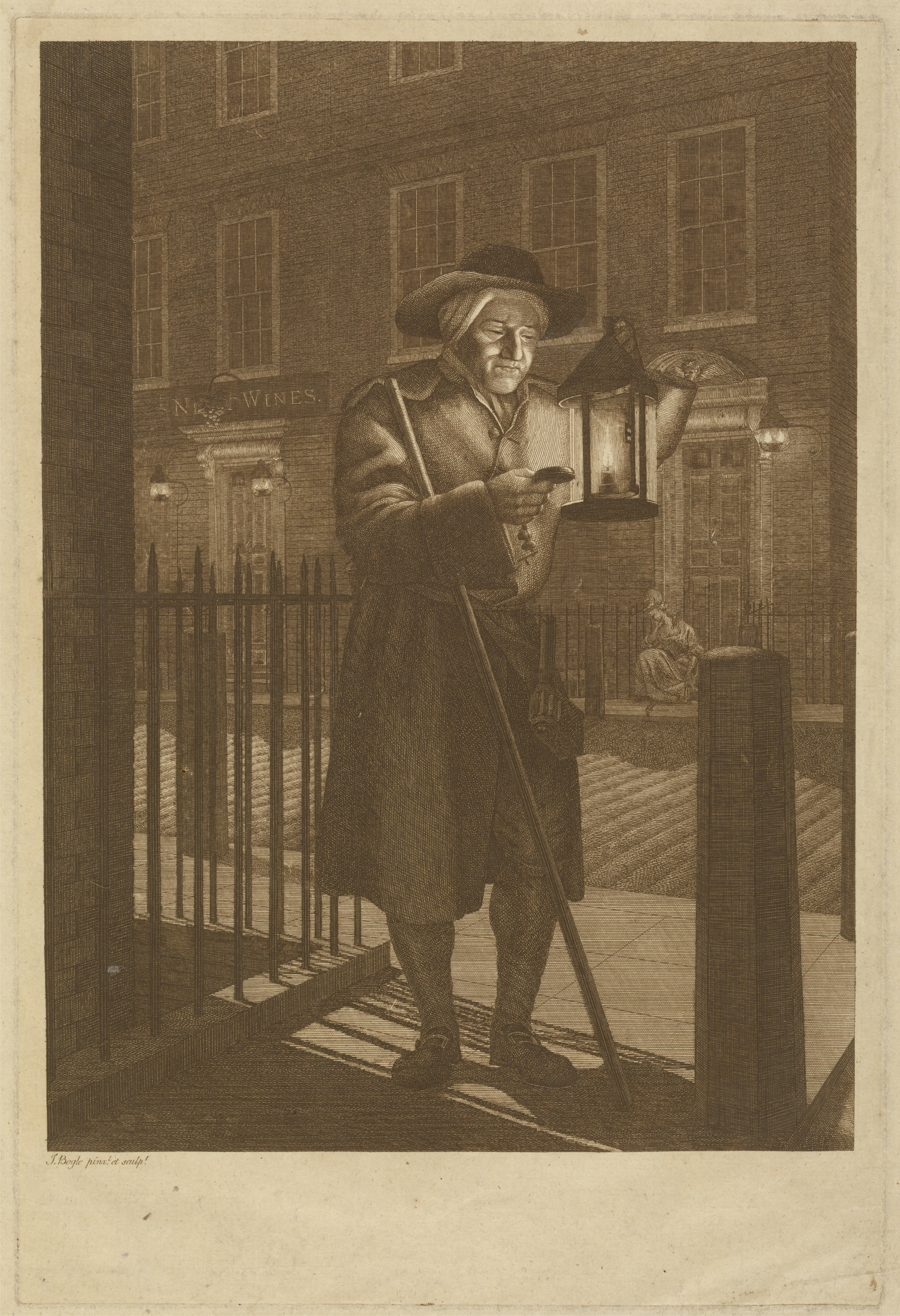
A city of London watchman, drawn and engraved by John Bogle (1776)

One critical issue addressed by Moreton in this pamphlet involves the night watch, a highly significant institution in the panorama of eighteenth-century London. As described by Moreton, the watchmen were "decrepit, superannuated wretches, with one foot in the grave and the other ready to follow" and therefore more suited to the Poor House than for patrolling of the streets: "so little terror they carry with them, that hardly thieves make a mere jest of them". He even supposes that some of them, discouraged by their low social status, might decide to make their fortunes by passing to the other side and enlarging the ranks of criminals. Along with many of his peers, Moreton believes that English society is completely at the mercy of a dramatic rise in numbers of street-robberies, burglaries, and house-breakings, crimes which are generating anxiety among all social classes in the capital. House-breaking especially seems to directly concerned the entire metropolis, including the more wealthy and fashionable parishes. Moreover, the latest changes of the urban surroundings have hardened the policing of the streets, especially with shops, taverns, coffee-houses, theatres, pleasure gardens, remaining open in the evening and such a large number of people moving around after dusk.

In the early eighteenth-century London, the night watchman was indeed an old controversial figure (established for the first time in the 1285 Statute of Winchester), deeply rooted in the belief that the individual citizen had to perform his social and moral duty for the well-being of the society. Hence, every London parish requested its householders to perform by rotation the watch-duty on an unpaid and amateur basis, from dusk until dawn, and with only a stick or an halberd as a weapon. Each watchman was assigned with a short length of street to patrol every hour, and he had to examine all suspicious characters from his assigned watch box (a sentry box with half-door). The performance of such duty took away a great amount of money and energy, so by the late seventeenth century it grew up the practice to pay a substitute (often another parishioner) to take up your watch duty. The fact that this service had to be arranged locally by parish officers rose a great number of issues. Firstly, the only men willing to take on this job for a very small wage were those who had little prospect of some other employment, usually old men hired as an alternative to the poor law grant. Secondly, Moreton suggests that "parochial misapplication" were commonplace around constables and beadles, appointed to collect the individual fee for the night-watch. They were often accused to spend as little as possible on hiring watchmen and pocket the difference as a recompense for the unpaid service they had performed.

=== Needed a reform? ===
Moreton proposes a pragmatic scheme (already in use in the parish of St. Giles in the Fields) for a more effective night watch. This should be "composed of stout able-bodied men", arranged in a sufficient number, one every forty houses "for it is observable that a man can not well see distinctly beyond the extent of twenty houses in a row". To avoid any possible abuse or misapplication in the distribution of the public money, Moreton suggests that the watch should be elected and paid by the householders themselves through an arranged rating and collecting system, and their annual wage should be increased to 20 pound, so that "a poor man, who with frugality may live decently thereon". Furthermore, watchmen should be adequately armed with firearms and swords in order to dispose of an efficient mean to prevent crime and to protect their person if needed. They should also be equipped with a lantern and a horn to sound the alarm.

Although some kind of reform was obviously needed to contrast the criminal problems of the streets, nowadays critics believe that watchmen were actually vigorously engaged in catching offenders, and that their work might be concealed in the records because the official arrest would be recorded by the constable in charge of the watch. The Old Bailey Session Papers report many examples of watchmen being very capable and brave in confronting and arresting offenders. Probably the statutory reward to be earned from the arrest of a street robber or a burglar was quite a good incentive, not to mention possible private gratuities and local rewards.

Regardless, Moreton is skeptical about the honesty of watchmen, and he doubts about their suspicious close relation with the criminal underworld in different contemporary pamphlets. Watchmen also appear as the accused in the Old Bailey Session Papers under trials for murder and theft, while the bribe they received from street prostitutes was quite common knowledge in eighteenth-century London.

== Reforming society ==
=== Prostitutes ===
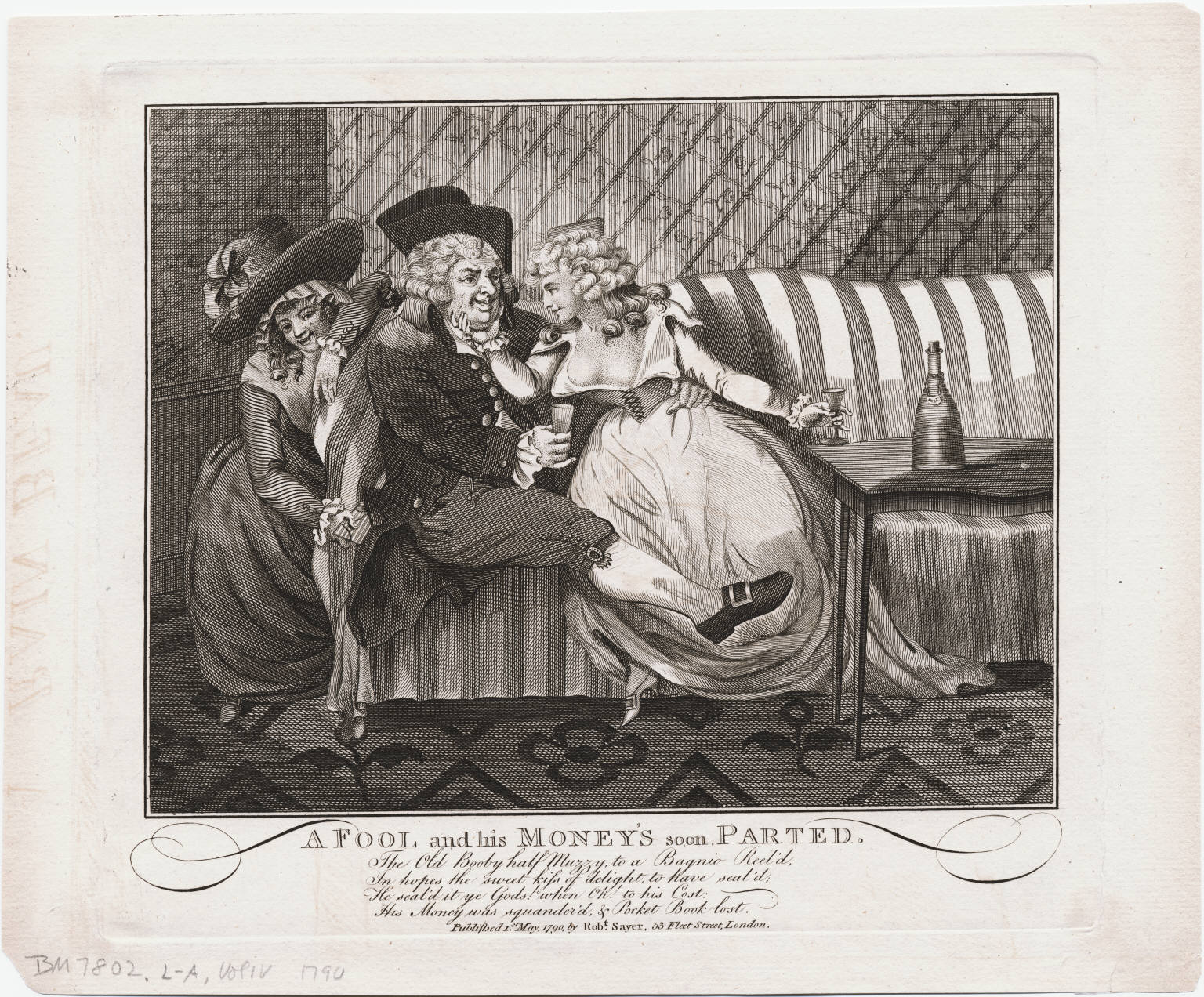
A Fool and His Money Soon Parted (1790) by Cruikshank, Isaac, 1756?–1811?, printmaker

In Moreton's reform for the security and prosperity of the city, a pressing issue is represented by prostitutes, depicted as agents of destruction that easily mislead men into criminality and seem to be "the first motive to their villainy, and egg them in all manner of mischief". London prostitutes were vigorously denounced in early eighteenth-century England, especially for their obscenities and aggressiveness. It was a common belief that these vicious women might corrupt young men, particularly apprentices and servants.

Watchmen, as guardians of the peace of the streets, were supposed to deal within the confines of their beat with drunkenness, soliciting, and petty tumults, and detaining suspicious characters. However, they were often willing to concede privileges to certain prostitutes, consequently provoking parishioners' complains about their inability to enforce the law. Indeed, even the prostitutes taken up by the watch were frequently released after a few hours in the watch house without seeing any magistrate. The circumstances changed when theft or some other kind of crimes were committed. Public opinion, and Moreton too, firmly believed that these women needed to be restrained in their liberties not only for their vices and immoralities but because they represented a real threat to common living. Unfortunately, most of the time this was easier said than done. Watchmen had the power to apprehend criminals within the boundaries of their parish, and they were liable to be reprimanded for leaving their beats. So they might not have been so inclined to chase a woman who crossed into another parish in order to avoid being taken.

Moreover, Moreton denounces night houses and cellars as places where prostitutes and thieves meet. Here, criminals "wait for signal of their scout; here they cast their schemes, and bring in advices; here they encourage and initiate young thieves; here they barter and sell their stolen goods; these are their exchanges and asylums after mischief".They sometimes acted as headquarters where felons could exchange goods and information. Morton views night houses as wicked fortresses for criminals that must be suppressed.

=== Servants ===
An insidious and internal threat was embodied by servants, having long been a problem in eighteenth-century London. A significant number of domestic servants were accused and stood trial for different levels of theft. London was the principal destination for young people looking for work and fortune, and most of them were employed as servants or apprentices in houses and shops. Defoe presents a detailed inventory of the servants classes in The Behaviour of servants in England (1725), including not only shop-keepers, manufactures, cooks, and footmen, but even clerks to lawyers, attorneys, and gentlemen in public offices. Servants were, in Moreton's opinion, an integral part of the household they worked for, and they should behave as adopted children, being entirely loyal to their employers. On the other hand, their masters and mistresses should also assume their responsibility towards them and "see that servants of both sexes go not a rambling when sent to church, but that they keep good hours; for many have been ruined by junketing and staying out, instead of being at church or at home".

Yet the temptations of the city and corrupting companionships could easily lead a perfectly diligent servant into the path of crime. A mounting anxiety grew between eighteenth-century Londoners regarding the danger posed by servants seeking employment in order to steal or open the house at night to their accomplices. According to Defoe, living in fear and suspicion of your servants, as feeling unsafe outdoors at night, means to live in an hostile country, a depiction unworthy of his idea of a flourishing England.

=== Soldiers and sailors ===
Social security was seriously threatened by the periodic disbandment of the military forces, a common situation at the conclusion of wars that led to hundreds of soldiers and sailors rambling around the streets of London without an occupation or a decent living arrangement. Periods of peace were commonly marked by an increase of violent crimes. In a post-war London competition for a job was fierce and the criminality rate for robbery and property crime rose alarmingly. Although sailors could eventually sign on some merchant ships, soldiers had not such prospects. Moreover, at the moment of their dismissal, cavalrymen had the possibility to keep their horses, having paid for them with their allowances. Adding their experience with weapons and their acquaintance with accomplices in a similar position, there were all the perfect premises for the rising of gangs of robbers and criminal alliances.

Moreton appears to be quite clever in tackling this issue. He starts asking for a state surveillance of the soldiers' quarters (to be maintained even after the war), with "surveyors that should call at the quarters of every soldier or sailor at a limited hour, to see if they are there or no, and register them at home or absent accordingly; absence to be penal", and then he progressively moves into employing them in his own project. To keep the streets free of highway robbers and footpads he proposes that soldiers on horses and on foot might be employed to patrol the streets and the surroundings of the city, and also to keep records of the convoys leaving and arriving. The additional wage for the performance of this service might even keep them from starting a criminal career.

=== Hackney coach drivers ===
Among those who earned their living in the streets of London, the more criticized were the hackney coach drivers. Moreton defines them "the scum of the people, and, generally speaking, the worst of rogues", robbing their customers on a regular basis, and often in league with highway robbers. Hackney coach travellers were generally at the mercy of their carriers, and even the simplest travel could easily turn into a real danger. Even the most "honest" among them were used to rework the city routes and rates as they pleased in order to increase their profits. Hackney coach drivers were so severely criticized for being rude and abusive, that in 1682 the Common Council had to pass an act for their regulation aiming: to limit their number, to establish a valid licence and a fair charge, and to set out places where they could wait for hire. Moreton brings the attention of the reader on a technicality that might explain why these drivers most of the time managed to walk unpunished. As a matter of fact, the renter of the coach rarely appears to be the actual driver (although they might be in league), therefore "the penalty, which used to be on the renter, being now on the driver, the renter or owner of that figure is clear, and the driver has nothing to do but to be absent and laugh at the complainant". For this reason, the law needs to be amended so that both the driver and the renter (for Moreton equally guilty) might be accountable for extortion, insolence, or offences. In addition, the renter should be obliged to register and respond for the behaviour of the driver he rented his coach to.

=== Beggars and vagrants ===
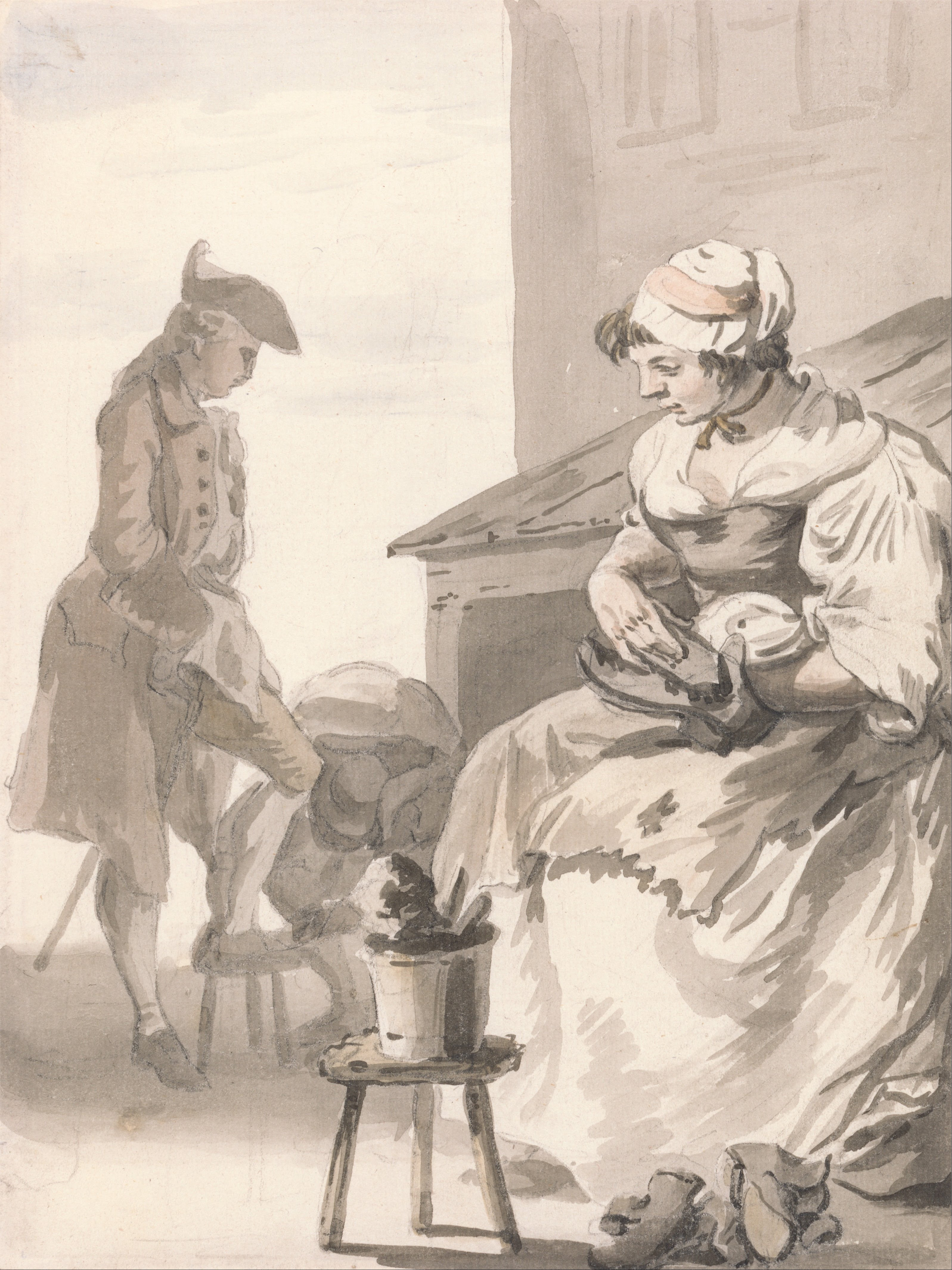
Shoe Cleaner (c.1759) by Paul Sandby

The group that most characterized London streets were beggars and vagrants. The broad eighteenth-century definition for beggar embraced not just the poorest people having to live on the street, but virtually anyone who would stop you asking for money, work, or offering you a service such as: shoe cleaners, linkboys, milkmaids, chimney sweeps, etc. Begging was quite an art, the way you held your body, the sores you showed or not showed, the tone of the voice, your gender and age, the time of the year, the narrative strategies you decided to adopt, all these elements affected the way you begged and had to be consider carefully. Moreton regards beggars and vagrants as potential criminals in disguise and affirms that they "should be suppressed, who lounge about all day, to see where they can steal at night" and that "all shoe-cleaners, I mean boys and sturdy vagrants, be suppressed, [...] as for link-boys, alias thieves with lights". Shoeblacks are a peculiar example of a vagrant occupation. Established as an employment at the end of the seventeenth-century, shoe cleaning provided a perfect excuse for approaching passers-by without incurring a penalty.

Both legislators and pamphlet writers complained about the long-standing existence of beggars in the streets of London and pushed for their imprisonment and reform. Despite the wide range of seventeenth-century and eighteenth-century anti-vagrancy legislation, some forms of begging were still considered acceptable. Many people were able to maintain their life on the streets, particularly women (especially if pregnant or with children) could keep on begging without being troubled by constables and watchmen.

Moreton, however, is not unconcerned of the situation of the decent poor people and vagrants, so he suggests that

barracks or barns should be built at convenient ends of the town, where all vagrants should be obliged to render themselves at a stated hour, where they should have clean straw allowed them, and be kept orderly and out of harm's way; they may be let loose if they have apparent means of honest livelihood, otherwise they should be sent to the workhouse of their respective parish, or to a general workhouse, of which there is great need; and of which more hereafter.

This proposition can be valued as an hint of the eighteenth-century ambivalent frame of mind towards these individuals. On one hand restrictions and penalties were vigorously demanded by the English society. On the other hand, not only some kinds of begging activities were allowed but, common people strongly felt a social and religious obligation to give something or to answer a plea.

=== Geneva shops or the "Trade of Wickedness" ===
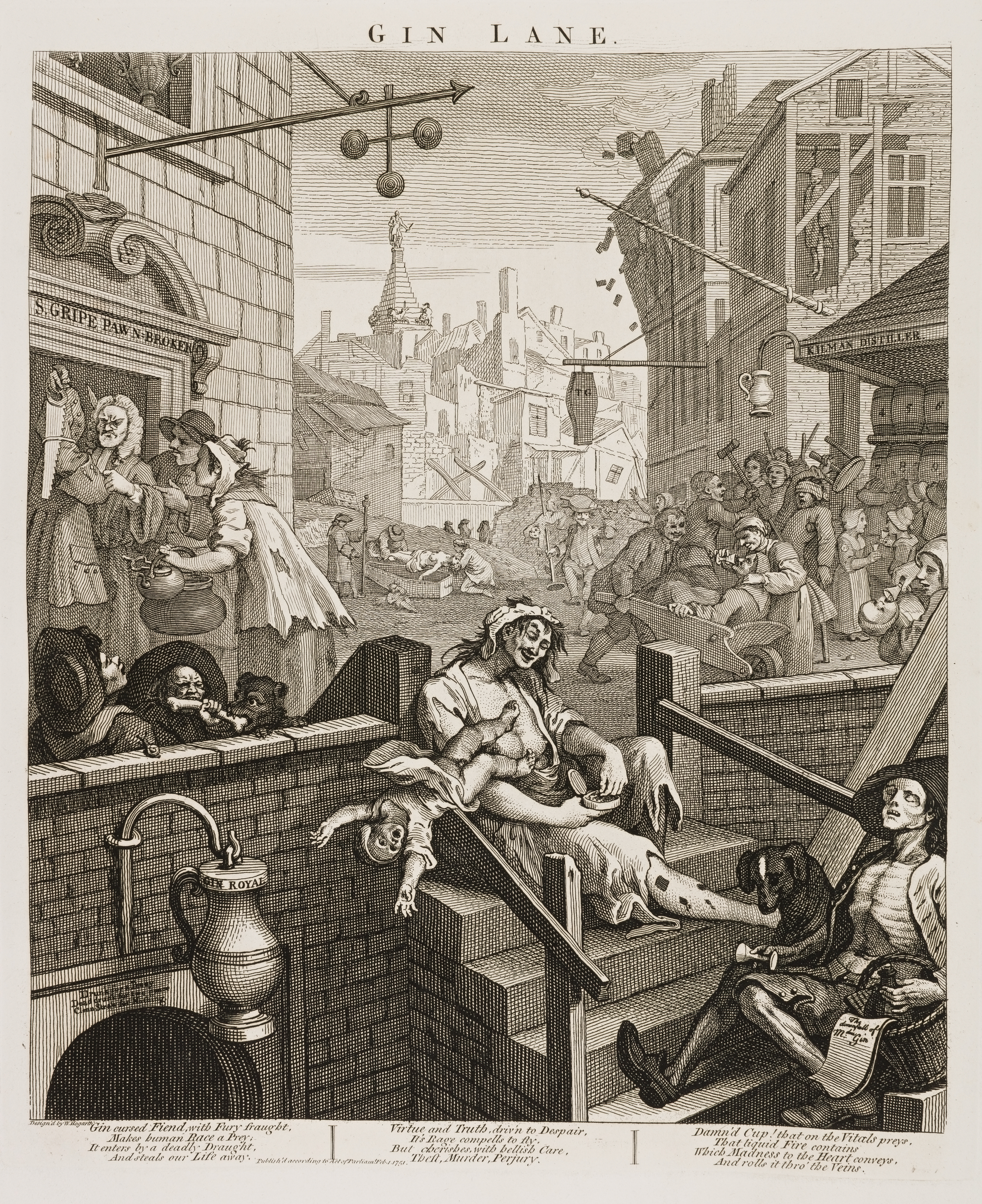
Gin Lane (1751) by William Hogarth

Among the principal causes for the dangers of the streets of London, Moreton lists the abuse of alcohol specifically geneva or gin. In the Gin Era of 1720–50 very cheap liquors were sold indiscriminately, often resulting in a debauch of spirit-drinking, whose effects were seen on the streets, in the workhouses, in the growing misery of the poor and in an increase of criminality and violent acts. Moreton argues that this wicked trade will be the doom of the English nation, and it represents a real threat to the entire community:

suppose a man able to maintain himself and family by his trade, and at the same time to be a Geneva drinker. This fellow first makes himself incapable of working by being continually drunk; which runs him behindhand, so that he either pawns, or neglects his work, for which reason nobody will employ him. At last, fear of arrests, his own hunger, the cries of a family for bread, his natural desire to support an irregular life, and a propense hatred to labour, turn but too many an honest tradesman into an arrant desperate rogue. And these are commonly the means that furnish us with thieves and villains in general.

The extensive consume of alcohol and the following addiction are widely described in the eighteenth-century newspapers and pamphlets. Bernard Mandeville, a British philosopher and satirist, states that alcohol abuse can produce devastating consequences for a person's judgment: "it makes man quarrelsome, renders 'em brutes and savages, sets 'em on to fight for nothing, and had often been the cause of murder". Even Henry Fielding, an active participant in the advancement of London law enforcement, points out in his 1751 essay An Enquiry into the Causes of the late Increase of Robbers that such a limitless consumption among the poor seriously threatens the public order and therefore a strict regulation and discipline must be adopted.

However eighteenth-century society struggled with the relation between drunkenness and responsibility especially when crime was involved. On one hand, it was believed that intoxication could alter a person's nature leading him to criminal behaviour, and consequently the judges and jurors were inclined to be tolerant towards these infractions. On the other hand, both citizens and law authorities shared the opinion that drunkenness was an unacceptable excuse, so if a crime was committed in such a state the felon must be fully prosecuted. With the harsh punishments of the Bloody Code pending on the head of the offender, English judges and jurors were usually willing to admit a plea for drunkenness. It was often regarded as an extenuating circumstance and most frequently resulted in the possibility of mitigation, acquittal, or pardon.

Moreton defines the Gin Craze as the "bane and ruin of our lower class people". He considers the English society as a set of cogs in a machine: if one collapses all collapse. "Those who deny an inferior class of people to be necessary in a body politic, contradict reason and experience itself; since they are most useful when industrious, and equally pernicious when lazy. By their industry our manufactures, trade, and commerce, are carried on". To stop this great evil Moreton proposes that all public houses and gin shops should be shut up at 10 p.m. and, considering the large quantities of gin consumed, gin shops should be subjected to licenses so that they can be kept under control.

=== Reforming manners and social values ===
Moreton believes that the rising criminality in the streets of London is a result of a late radical change in the English society, which seems to be pervaded by greed and hunger for power at all levels. The love for luxury and a public short-sightedness have shaped a new reality based on avarice and on criminal behaviour, as a consequence of "our effeminacy, our toupee wigs, and powdered pates, our tea, and other scandalous fopperies". This shift towards greed and social ambition was not prerogative of the middle and upper classes but it could be retrieved even in the lower classes, eager to climb the social ladder. These criticisms are expressively restated in Defoe's Applebee articles:

What can be said in Favour of that Luxury, which is not content with the Equipage of a Lord; a Coach and Six, a Revenue, with Servants and Establishments in proportion; but that, to have two Coaches and Six, and two Sets of Servants, and two Revenues, &c. would Mortgage Faith and Honour, Character and Principles, and even run the Risk of losing the Estate they had, and starving their Posterity?

and even in his fictional works such as Moll Flanders and Roxana.

Moreover, Moreton is interested in showing how the greediness of a small group of people might affect the entire community. He puts on trial especially bakers, coal merchants, butchers, and tallow chandlers that have dramatically risen their prices because "usual and moderate profit will not content them; they cannot drink malt liquor, and the poor must pay for the wine". Being these basic necessities, "for men not being able to support their families by honest labour, and being made beggars by reason of the dearness of provisions, ofttimes grow desperate and turn rogues". Moreton proposes a state regulation upon tradesmen, hoping that the "government will make them honest, even against their will", but he also advocates a return to home industry, bringing prosperity to national trade and providing an opportunity to exercise the long-standing tradition of English craftsmanship.

The end of the seventeenth century and the beginning of the eighteenth century witnessed an increasing concern for vices and immorality spreading all over the country. There was a general sense of falling into the worst possible form of behaviour and a common feeling that avarice, vice, idleness, blasphemy, vagrancy and crime were all entangles together pushing people (poor and wealthy, young and old) into a slippery slope to damnation. A drastic social reformation was required and, at the end of the seventeenth-century, societies for the reformation of manners started emerging with a rank of proper paid agents operating locally. Indeed, Defoe was just one of the many eighteenth-century voices believing that at least part of the falling of the offender was due to a weakening of the social and moral values of the English society.

== Reforming the streets ==
=== Street lighting ===
As we have seen so far, Moreton pays close attention to the most practical points of his project, as it also happens with the inadequacy of the street lighting system in London; after all his aim is to render the city "strongly guarded, and so gloriously illuminated". Moreton proposes that:

a convenient number of lamps be set up, and those not of the convex kind, which blind the eyes, and are of no manner of use; they dazzle, but give no distinct light, and further, rather than prevent robberies. Many persons, deceived and blinded by these ignes fatui, have been run over by coaches, carts, &c., people stumbling more, even under these very lamps, than in the dark. In short, they are most unprofitable lights, and, in my opinion, rather abuses than benefits.

Between the seventeenth century and the early eighteenth century the lightning system of the streets of London was radically transformed with the adoption of lamps with convex lens: a bull's eye glass that had the effect of concentrating the light. This new type of lamp lit up much more of the street than it was usual with candles and lanterns with horn sides; though they produced such a concentrated beam of light to dazzle the passers-by, and preventing them from seeing possible near dangers. According to Moreton, this is not just a minor annoyance but a real peril for the common citizen's life and conversely an unexpected facilitator for criminals.

A new lighting legislation was enacted in 1736, setting up a new kind of seal oil lamp giving a better light even during winter. It was also decided that lamps on the main streets should be twenty-five yards apart (and not thirty as before). These changes were well received by the public opinion, and even in the Old Bailey Session Papers was not uncommon to read about victims and witnesses claiming to be able to identify the accused because of a better street lightning.

=== Securing the streets ===
Improving the condition of London's streets was not only a matter of preventing crime or apprehending robbers. Moreton recognized that the layout of roads, lanes and avenues could make a difference, warning that otherwise "all by-turnings, courts, alleys, lanes, and corners, which may favour a street-robber's escape, and make our project ineffectual". The same concern appears in Henry Fielding's 1751 essay An Enquiry into the Causes of the Late Increase of Robbers, in which he described the city's irregular buildings and its many lanes, alleys, courts and byways as ideal for concealment:

Whoever indeed considers the Cities of London and Westminster, with the late vast Addition of their Suburbs; the great irregularity of their Buildings, the immense Number of Lanes, Alleys, Courts and Bye-places; must think, that, had they intended for the very purpose of Concealment, they could scarce have been contrived. Upon such a view, the whole appears as a vast Wood or Forest, in which a Thief may harbour with as great Security, as wild Beasts do in the Deserts of Africa or Arabia.

Improving the condition of London's streets was not only a matter of preventing crime or apprehending robbers. Moreton recognised that the layout of roads, lanes and avenues could make a difference, warning that otherwise "all by-turnings, courts, alleys, lanes, &c., which may favour a street-robber's escape, … make our project ineffectual".

Daniel Defoe's fiction similarly depicts London as offering hiding places to those who knew where to find them. His London is not a single city but several that coexisted on the same streets: a commercial London of shops, merchants, apprentices and servants, and a criminal London of thieves, swindlers and destitute children.

== Reforming the theatre ==
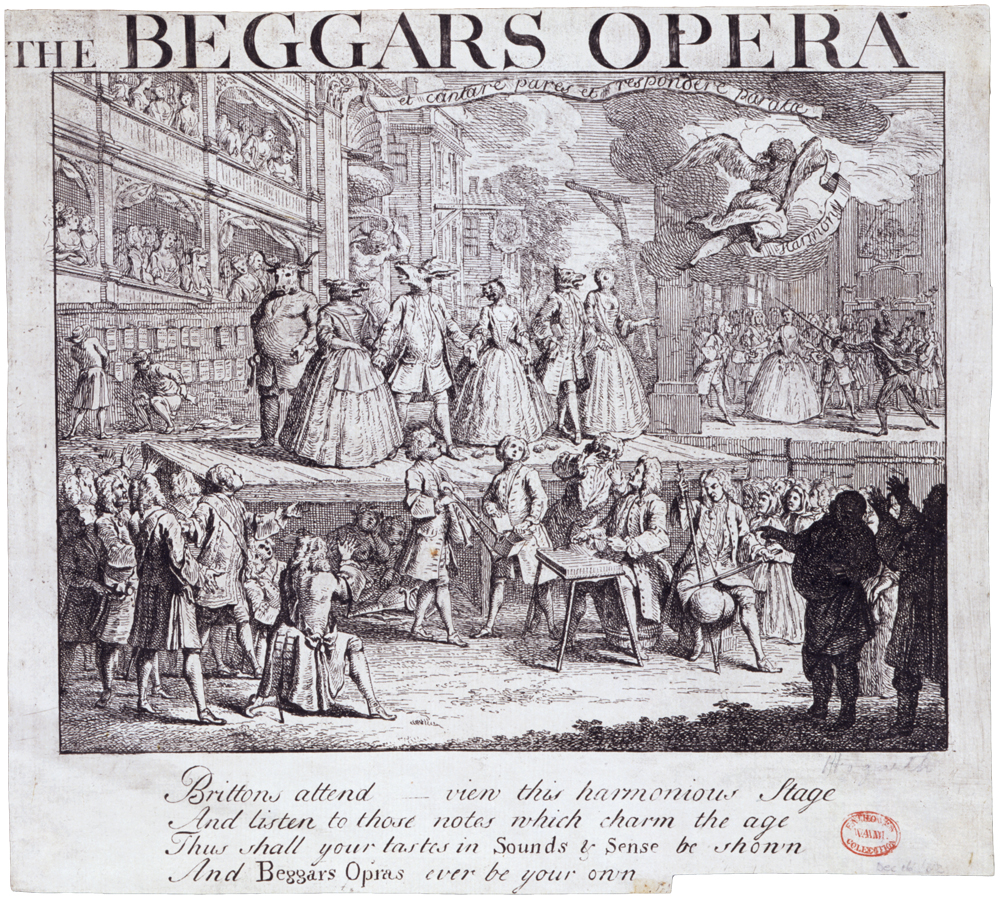
The Beggar's Opera (1728) by William Hogarth

In each of his pamphlets Andrew Moreton reprimands the theatre and its effects on the English society, especially in the case of The Beggar’s Opera (1728), a ballad opera by John Gay, where "thieves are set out in so amiable a light […] it has taught them to value themselves on their profession rather than to be ashamed of it". Moreton also includes in Second Thoughts Are Best harsh criticisms against the obscure The Quaker's Opera (an imitation of The Beggar's Opera) by Thomas Walker, even more wicked than the former. He emphasizes the social impact that such plays might have on simple-minded people, and considers their relevance to the issue of community's well-being: "too many weak minds have been drawn away, and many unwary persons so charmed with his appearance on the stage, dressed in that elegant manner, and his pockets so well lined, they have forthwith commenced street-robbers or housebreakers; so that every idle fellow, weary of honest labour, need but fancy himself a Macheath or a Shepherd, and there is a rogue made at once". Such objections to The Beggar’s Opera were widely shared by many contemporary critics, who expressly blamed the play, in various 1728 newspapers, for a new increase in street criminality after a recent decrease.

Indeed, during the middle part of the eighteenth-century, highwaymen enjoyed a strange popular adulation. Common people, intrigued by their stories and personalities, would often crowd Newgate prison in order to see them. Jack Sheppard, James Maclean, Dick Turpin became figures of legend in the popular imagination, inhabiting the realms of both reality and fiction. In truth, Daniel Defoe was not immune to this fascination. In 1724 he published History of the Remarkable Life of Sheppard and A Narrative of All robberies, Escapes, &c. of John Sheppard, portraying the famous robber as a refined criminal exchanging jokes and performing clever tricks. Defoe was captivated by the criminal life, especially when it involved witty stratagems and subterfuges, and as it is clearly shown in his fictions, like Moll Flanders and Colonel Jack, his intent often seems more amusing than didactic.

Nevertheless, whenever Defoe deals with social and moral problems he always tries to reach his reader with clarity and practical proposals. The theatre, being a highly influential form of entertainment, "ought to be reformed, and nothing exhibited but what might be represented before a bishop". The example Moreton recommends is The Provoked Husband (1728), a play that Colley Cibber, reworked from an unfinished manuscript of John Vanbrugh. It had an enormous success, during its first run it was on stage for twenty-eight nights in a row and it opened two Drury Lane seasons. The play exposes the dynamics of a disrupt marriage, revolving around a frivolous headstrong wife who spends her days gambling, keeping bad companies, spending extravagantly, and speaking insolently to her husband. Yet at the end, moved by her husband's kindness and firm principles, she reforms and eventually expresses her gratitude and unworthiness, a turn that bears many similarities with Defoe's fictional works.

== Bibliography ==
- Backscheider P.R. (1989), Daniel Defoe: His Life, Baltimore: Johns Hopkins University Press, ISBN 0801837855.
- Beattie J.M. (2001), Policing and punishment in London 1660–1750, Urban Crimes and the Limits of Terror, Oxford: Oxford University Press, ISBN 978-0199257232.
- Defoe D. (1729), Second Thoughts Are Best. Retrieved on Gutenberg: http://www.gutenberg.org/ebooks/32404
- Handerson T. (1999), Disorderly Women in Eighteenth-century London. Prostitution and Control in the Metropolis, 1730–1830, London: Longman, ISBN 0582263956.
- Hitchcock T. (2005), 'Begging on the Streets of Eighteenth-century London', Journal of British Studies, Vol.44, No.3, pp. 478–498.
- Hitchcock T. and Shoemaker R. (2006), Tales from the Hanging Court, London: Bloomsbury, ISBN 978-0340913758.
- Marshall A. (2007), 'Daniel Defoe as Satirist', Huntington Library Quarterly, Vol. 70, No. 7, pp. 553–576.
- Novak M. E. (2001), Daniel Defoe, Masters of Fiction: His Life and Ideas, Oxford: Oxford University Press, ISBN 978-0199261543.
- Rabin D. (2005), 'Drunkness and Responsibility for Crime in the Eighteenth-century', Journal of British Studies, Vol.44, No.3, pp. 457–477.
- Richetti J. (2008), The Cambridge Companion to Daniel Defoe, New York: Cambridge University Press, ISBN 978-0521675055.
- Tobias J.J. (1979), Crime and Police in England: 1700–1900, Dublin: Gill and Macmillan,ISBN 978-0312547820.
