= The Protestant Monastery =

1726 pamphlet by Daniel Defoe

The Protestant Monastery: or, a Complaint against the Brutality of the Present Age is a 1726 pamphlet by Daniel Defoe. It focuses on contemporary disrespect towards elders. Similarly to Every-body's Business, Is No-body's Business (1725), Parochial Tyranny (1727), Augusta Triumphans (1728) and Second Thoughts are Best (1729), it was published under the pseudonym of Andrew Moreton. Defoe did not sign his name to the majority of his works. He preferred them to be published anonymously or under one of his pen names. This choice was "sometimes" made "to conceal his authorship or to stimulate sales, but more characteristically to establish a point of view".

== Bibliography ==
- Backscheider, P B, Daniel Defoe. His Life, The Johns Hopkins University Press, Baltimore and London, 1989.
- "Social Projects", Daniel Defoe. The Collection of the Lily Library, Indiana University Bloomington, 2008, retrieved 25 October 2015
- George, M D, London Life in the Eighteenth Century, Penguin Books, Great Britain, 1979.
- Maldonado, T, "Defoe and the 'Projecting Age'", MIT Press, vol. 18, no. 1, 2002, pp. 78-85, retrieved 20 October 2015, JSTOR
- Moore, J R, "Defoe's Persona as Author: The Quaker's Sermon", SEL: Studies in English Literature 1500–1900, vol. 11, no. 3, pp. 507-516, retrieved 20 November 2015, JSTOR
- Novak, M E, "Last Productive Years", Daniel Defoe Master of Fictions. His Life and Ideas, Oxford University Press, United States of America, 2001.
