= Projector (business) =

Archaic term for promoter of a project

A projector in the business context is an individual who promotes a project or scheme to combine public benefit and private profit. The term came into use in sixteenth century England and remained in popular language until the nineteenth century when it fell from use. The term has often been used pejoratively.

== Early use of the term ==
This use of the term projector emerged during the reign of Elizabeth I (1558–1603). In previous decades bureaucratic initiatives to stimulate domestic production were already referred to as projects. When rising prices and unemployment marked the early years of Elizabeth I’s reign, the government sought a remedy in the expansion of domestic manufacturing and thus the role of the projector emerged. The issue of chartered patents for new projects provided monopolies and privileges for potential projectors, who thus played an important role in developing economic activity.

== The Age of Projectors ==
The re-organisation of the state following the Glorious Revolution of 1688 – particularly in regard to new fiscal arrangements such as the creation of Europe’s first widely circulating credit currency – inaugurated the "Age of Projectors". In 1693 Daniel Defoe wrote An Essay Upon Projects in which he declared that he was living in a "Projecting Age". Many proposals combined the prospect of military conquest with that of commercial expansion.
