= Foundling =

Foundling or The Foundling may refer to:

== Places ==
- Foundling hospital, an institution where abandoned children were cared for
  - Foundling Hospital, Dublin, founded 1704
  - Foundling Hospital, Cork, founded 1737
  - Foundling Hospital, founded 1739 in London
- Foundling Museum, a museum telling the story of the London Foundling Hospital

== Literature ==
- The Foundling and Other Tales of Prydain, a prequel to Lloyd Alexander's The Chronicles of Prydain
- The Foundling (Heyer novel), a 1948 novel by Georgette Heyer
- The Foundling (Leary novel), a 2022 novel by Ann Leary
- The Foundling (play), a 1748 play by Edward Moore
- The History of Tom Jones, a Foundling, a 1749 novel by Henry Fielding
- Monster Blood Tattoo: Foundling, the first book of the Monster Blood Tattoo fantasy trilogy by D. M. Cornish

== Music ==
- Foundling (album), the ninth studio album by David Gray
  - "Foundling", the album's title track
- The Foundling (album), a 2010 album by Mary Gauthier
- "Foundling" (Cardiacs song), 1996
- "Foundling", a song by the Unthanks from Mount the Air

== Film and television ==
- The Foundling (1915 film), a silent film directed by John B. O'Brien
  - The Foundling (1916 film), a remake of the 1915 film, was also directed by O'Brien
- The Foundling (1940 film), a 1940 comedy-drama
- "The Foundling" (The Waltons), a 1972 television episode
- "Chapter 20: The Foundling", an episode of The Mandalorian

== Other uses ==
- An abandoned child, see child abandonment
- Safe Haven Law, a law that decriminalizes parents leaving their unharmed children at designated spots or with persons, allowing the child to be a ward of the state. It's also known as a Baby Moses law in some states.
- New York Foundling, a child welfare agency
- Foundlings (Noon Universe), characters in the fictional Noon Universe created by Arkady and Boris Strugatsky
