= Octophone =

Stringed musical instrument

Octofone
String instrument
- Other names: Octophone
- Classification: String instrument (plucked), (strummed)
- Hornbostel–Sachs classification: 321.322 (Composite chordophone)

Related instruments
- Bowed and plucked string instruments; Mandolin; Mandola; Irish bouzouki

The octophone (or octofone) is a stringed musical instrument related to the mandola family resembling an octave mandolin. It was marketed by Regal Musical Instrument Company, who introduced it 21 January 1928, as an "eight-purpose instrument".

The name "Octophone" came from the idea that the instrument could take on the "tone combinations" of eight instruments, the tenor guitar, tenor banjo, ukulele, taro patch, tiple, mandolin, mandola and mandocello. Changing from one instrument to another was a matter of changing the tuning. The instrument came with an instruction book that told owners "how to use, how to tune and how to play" the instrument

== Construction ==
The instrument measures 33.5 inches long, 10 5/8 inches wide at lower end, 3 1/8 deep at the end block. It has a scale of 21 3/8 inches.

Owners of octophones have said that the instrument is made with birch neck, neck block, sides and back and a top made of spruce. The neck is attached to the body with a 3/4 inch wooden dowel stuck into a hole in the neck block, rather than a strong joint such as the dovetail used on some guitars and mandolins. The instruments were lightly built and fragile, or have grown fragile with age.

== Tuning ==
The tuning is done with the machine heads located on the headstock, much like other stringed instruments, and the strings are arranged in courses. All pitches shown here are estimates; the book the company provided (to show customers how to tune their instrument) is rare. Tunings are based on the instruments advertised. These tunings using the stringed instrument tunings notation include:

- C3 C3•G3 G3•D4 D4•A4 A4 tuned in fifths as tenor guitar, mandola, tenor banjo
- D2 D2•G2 G2•B2 B2•E3 E3 tuned a fourth, a third, a fourth as a tiple
- C2 C2•E2 E2•A2 A2•D3 D3 tuned a fourth, a third, a fourth as a tiple
- G2 G2•D3 D3•A3 A3•E4 E4 tuned in fifths as octave mandolin
- C2 C2•G2 G2•D3 D3•A3 A3 tuned in fifths as mandocello
- D2 D2•G2 G2•B2 B2•E3 E3 tuned a fourth, a third, a fourth (as a guitar's 4 highest pitched strings, down 1 octave)

Although it can be tuned to the same notes as a mandolin G D A E, it will be in tune an octave lower, like an octave mandolin.

== Use in recorded music ==
- Nathan "Prince" Nazaroff album, recorded in 1945 Jewish Freilach Songs, he sings "with octofone and accordion."
- Chris Cagle album, Cris Cagle, Jonathan Yudkin is listed with the mandolin, mandocello, fiddle, cello, and octophone.
- Joey Bochenek album "Musical Wizard", the artist Joey plays nine instruments including the octophone.
- Gurf Morlix plays an octophone on the title song of the Mary Gauthier album "Mercy Now", although the liner notes spell the instrument as octofone.

== Perfume organ ==
An unrelated instrument, also called "octophone" was an instrument invented by a French chemist, in which the keys of a keyboard activated one of 46 perfume fragrances.
