= Kamar Ahmad Simon =

Bangladeshi film director

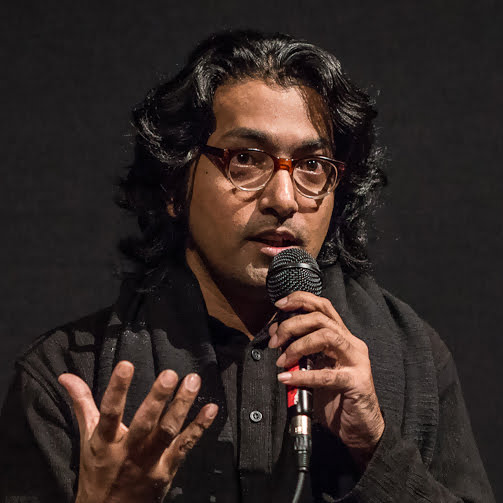
- Education: Bangladesh University of Engineering and Technology
- Occupations: Film director, cinematographer, writer, architect
- Years active: 2012–present
- Awards: Harrell Awards in CIFF (2022); World Cinema Fund (2017,2016); Arte International Prix & Open Doors Awards, Locarno Film Festival (2016); Featured Red Carpet Director at Piazza Grande, Locarno Film Festival (2016); The Asian Pitch (2013,2015); Grand Prix for Best Feature-Length Documentary in Cinéma du Réel (2013); Best Cinematography in MIFF (2014); Golden Conch for Best Documentary in MIFF (2014); Bangladesh National Film Award for Best Non-fiction (2013)

Kamar Ahmad Simon is a Bangladeshi filmmaker. He was featured as red carpet director in Piazza Grande at Locarno and has won various awards including the prestigious Harrell Award at CIFF (Camden), Grand Prix at Cinéma du Réel (Paris), Open Doors Award and Arte International Prix at Locarno, Golden Conch at MIFF (Mumbai), grants from Sundance, IDFA-Bertha and WCF/ Berlinale. He has been a jury member of the Sydney International Film Festival for the Australian segment, La Bibliothèque publique d’information (BPI) France, Johns Hopkins University USA has acquired his film and Royal Anthropological Institute of Great Britain and Ireland (RAI) have exhibited his work.

== Early life and education ==
Kamar was born and brought up in an orthodox Muslim family of the old part of Dhaka, Bangladesh.

He passed one of the most competitive exams at Bangladesh University of Engineering & Technology and enrolled in an undergraduate program studying architecture. He became interested in international cinema after attending local film festivals, and he started exploring the ethos of artistic filmmaking.

== Career ==
After graduating as an architect, Kamar has started his career as a creative director. He built a basic studio setup of camera, sound, gears and an alternative projection setup on his own. To advance his learning with no film school in the country, Kamar enrolled into programs like Berlinale Talents, European AudioVisual Entrepreneurs (EAVE) workshops (Croatia, Luxembourg and Amsterdam), IDFAcademy Summer School (Amsterdam, Netherlands), Produire au Sud (Nantes, France) and Asian Film Academy (Busan, South Korea).

Kamar's works explore existential themes, and his style challenges the border between fiction and non-fiction.

He came to fame with his debut Are You Listening!, for which he won the Grand Prix at Cinéma du Réel at the Centre Pompidou in Paris and Golden Conch at the Mumbai International Film Festival. Are You Listening! was also the opening film of Locarno Open Doors Screening and Dok-Leipzig in Germany.

Kamar was featured as the red carpet Director at Locarno Piazza Grande after winning the Open Doors Awards in Locarno Open Doors Hub for the 2nd part of the water trilogy ‘Day after…’, which was in the main international competition of IDFA 2021. It was also invited to La Atelier Cinéfondation of Cannes. Kamar received World Cinema Fund at the Berlinale for his feature Iron Stream.

The Bibliothèque nationale de France and Johns Hopkins University have acquired his film and Royal Anthropological Institute of Great Britain and Ireland (RAI) have exhibited his work.

== Filmography ==
=== Shunte Ki Pao! (Are You Listening!) ===
Kamar's first feature creative non-fiction film is Are You Listening!, released in 1012.

Are You Listening! was the ‘Curtain-Opener’ of 55th DOK Leipzig in Germany (2012), the oldest documentary festivals of the world. Later, the film won the ‘Grand Prix’ in the 35th Cinéma du Réel held in Paris (2013) and Golden Conch Award on 9 February 2014 at the Mumbai International Film Festival (MIFF). Kamar also won the award for "Best Cinematography" for the same film. It was also the opening film of Open Doors Screening at Locarno Film Festival. First of Kamar's Water Trilogy, the film was awarded twice by Jan Vrijman Fund from IDFA and also by Visions Sud est from Switzerland. It was awarded as one of the best Pitches at the Asian Forum for Documentaries and it is invited to Berlinale Talent Campus Studio Lab for editing. The film won 2015 Bangladesh National Film Award for Best Documentary Film. The film theme is selected among the top ten lists out 125 in the La Cinema Du Monde (World's Cinema) in Cannes Film Festival and it is the first of this sort of achievement for Bangladesh.

=== Ekti Sutar Jobanbondi (Testimony of a Thread) 2015 ===
Testimony of a Thread was his first television documentary which was co-produced by four leading Asian Broadcasters NHK (Japan), KBS (Korea), Mediacorp (Singapore) and PTS (Taiwan). This film won the Asian Pitch for its screenplay. According to the director, Testimony of a Thread is a monologue collage inspired by Akira Kurosawa’s Roshomon, in search of a face behind the numbers of the deadliest structural failure accident in modern human history.

=== Neel Mukut 2021 ===
Co-produced by four leading Asian Broadcasters NHK (Japan), KBS (Korea), Mediacorp (Singapore) and PTS (Taiwan), Neel Mukut was set for theatrical release on 27 March 2020 but then halted due to the COVID-19 pandemic. Although, initially nothing had been shared about the film's story or lineup but the poster of the film drew much attention. The film also received an uncut censor certificate from Bangladesh Censor Board. Finally the film was released in Bangladeshi OTT platform Chorki on 8 August 2021. Being a docu-fiction, a genre not much explored in Bangladesh, the film received a positive response from both the critics and audience.

=== Anyadin... (Day After...) 2021 ===
Day After... is the second part of Water Trilogy by Kamar after Are You Listening!. The film had its world premiere on 20 November 2021 at the Pathé Tuschinski in Amsterdam, Netherlands after being nominated at the International Competition of IDFA that year. Winner of the prestigious Harrell Awards for the best at the Camden International Film Festival (CIFF), the film was also invited at other prominent festivals like the First Look Film Festival by Museum of the Moving Image (MoMI), Vancouver International Film Festival and Zurich Film Festival. The project was invited to La Atelier in Cannes 2017 as one of the 15 promising scripts. For this work-in-progress Kamar was awarded ‘Open Doors Awards’ & ‘ARTE International Prix’ in Locarno Film Festival (Open Doors) 2016. Co-produced by Barents Film and DW Film, earlier the project also received grant awards from Sundance Film Festival and International Documentary Film Festival Amsterdam (IDFA).

=== Shikolbaha (Iron Stream) ===
Iron Stream is Kamar's first fiction project. It was the only non-European selection out of 24 projects which were invited to European Producers Workshop. Iron Stream received script development grant from Goteborg International Film Festival, Sweden. It was also invited to European Post-Production Connection (EP2C) and Produire au Sud a co-production platform of Festival of 3 Continents in Nantes, France. This script also won World Cinema Fund (WCF) from Berlin International Film Festival twice and National Film Grant of Bangladesh. The film is co-produced by Germany's Weydemann Bros. The project was initially titled as Shongkhodhoni (Silence of the Seashell).

== Awards and accolades ==
- Harrell Awards, Camden International Film Festival (CIFF)
- Arte International Prix & Open Doors Awards, Locarno Film Festival
- Featured Red Carpet Director at Piazza Grande, Locarno Film Festival
- Grant Award, Sundance Film Festival
- Grant Award: Script & Production, IDFA (Jan Vrijman Fund & IDFA Bertha Fund)
- World Cinema Fund (WCF), Berlin Film Festival
- Opening Night Film, 55th Dok-Leipzig, Germany 2012
- Jury Award, Film South Asia 2013, Nepal
- Grand Prix for Best Feature-Length Documentary, 35th Cinéma du Réel 2013, France
- Audience Choice Award, Seattle South Asian Film Festival (SSAFF) 2014, Seattle, USA
- Best Cinematography, Mumbai International Film Festival (MIFF) 2014, India
- Golden Conch for Best Feature-Length Documentary, Mumbai International Film Festival (MIFF) 2014, India
- Best Feature for Best Feature-Length Non-fiction, Bangladesh National Film Award 2013
