= Are You Listening =

Are You Listening may refer to:

- Are You Listening!, a Bangladeshi film
- Are You Listening? (film), a 1932 MGM drama film
- Are You Listening? (album), by Dolores O'Riordan, 2007
- Are You Listening?, an album by Emery, 2010
