= Findling Award =

Former German film prize

- Awarded for: Film awards
- Country: Germany
- First award: 1982

The Findling Award or short Findling (German: Findlingspreis) was a German film award donated by the umbrella organization of cultural cinemas and film clubs Verband für Filmkommunikation. It was founded in 1982 in GDR and was awarded on several film festivals. Far more than hundred filmmakers received this award. The prize itself is a stone on a pedestal with a metal plate designed by sculptor Peter Lewandowsky. Part of the prize's endowment was a tour of the winning film with its director and a critic, often with Sven Eggers, to cultural cinemas, art houses and film clubs. The award was named after a glacial erratic, but plays with the word as it also means "foundling". Sometimes, though wrong, you read Findling Prize.

== Festivals ==
It was awarded on all GDR National film festivals:

- Nationales Spielfilmfestival der DDR (National Feature Film Festival of GDR) in Karl-Marx-Stadt (1982-1990)
- Nationales Festival des Dokumentarfilms der DDR (National Festival of Documentary Film of GDR) in Neubrandenburg (1982-1989)
- Nationales Kinderfilmfestival Goldener Spatz (National Children's Film Festival) in Gera (1983-1989)
- Internationale Dokumentar- und Kurzfilmwoche (International Week of Documentary and Animation Film) (now: dok Leipzig) in Leipzig (1983-1989)

After 1990 it is awarded on the following festivals:

- Filmfestival Cottbus Festival for Eastern European Feature Film (1991-2002)
- FilmArtFestival Mecklenburg-Pomerania German Feature Film Festival Schwerin (1991-2013)
- dokumentART International Documentary Film Festival Neubrandenburg (1992-2015)
- Film-Festival im Stadthafen Rostock / Young German Film (2004-2014)
- dok Leipzig (Internationales Leipziger Festival für Dokumentar- und Animationsfilm)
- 2015 and 2016 the Findling also was awarded abroad at the SEFF Szczecin European Film Festival in Poland.

== Selected honorees ==
- Aktan Abdykalykov
- Frank Beyer
- Janez Burger
- Ernst Cantzler
- Kacper Czubak
- Wiktar Nitschyparawitsch Daschuk
- Sergey Dvortsevoy
- Saša Gedeon
- Roland Gräf
- Fyodor Khitruk
- Eva Knopf
- Volker Koepp
- Jan Jakub Kolski
- Viktor Kossakovsky
- Dmitry Kubasov
- Kirsi Marie Liimatainen
- Tama Tobias Macht
- Kurt Maetzig
- Chingiz Narynov
- Grzegorz Pacek
- Christian Petzold
- Mikko Piela
- Zofia Pręgowska
- Cristi Puiu
- Egon Schlegel
- Hans-Christian Schmid
- Igor Šterk
- Audrius Stonys
- Kurt Tetzlaff
- Andres Veiel
- Andreas Voigt
- Lothar Warneke
- Petr Zelenka

== Sources ==
- Becker, Wieland; Petzold, Volker, eds. (2001), Tarkowski trifft King Kong - Geschichte der Filmklubbewegung der DDR (in German), Berlin: VISTAS, ISBN 978-3891583098
