= Jubilee (TV series) =

Indian period drama series

- Promotional poster
- Genre: Period drama
- Created by: Vikramaditya Motwane; Soumik Sen
- Written by: Hartej Sawhney; Nishant Agarwal
- Screenplay by: Atul Sabharwal
- Story by: Atul Sabharwal; Soumik Sen
- Directed by: Vikramaditya Motwane
- Starring: Prosenjit Chatterjee; Aparshakti Khurana; Aditi Rao Hydari; Sidhant Gupta; Wamiqa Gabbi; Ram Kapoor; Nandish Sandhu
- Music by: Songs: Amit Trivedi; Background Score: Alokananda Dasgupta
- Country of origin: India
- Original language: Hindi
- No. of seasons: 1
- No. of episodes: 10

Production
- Producer: Dipa De Motwane
- Cinematography: Pratik Shah
- Editor: Aarti Bajaj
- Camera setup: Multi-camera
- Production companies: Andolan Films; Reliance Entertainment; Phantom Studios

Original release
- Network: Amazon Prime Video
- Release: 7 April 2023

Jubilee is an Indian Hindi-language period drama television series on Amazon Prime Video. The series is co-created and directed by Vikramaditya Motwane along with Soumik Sen and produced by Andolan Films, Phantom Studios and Reliance Entertainment. The series featured an ensemble cast of Prosenjit Chatterjee, Aparshakti Khurana, Sidhant Gupta, Aditi Rao Hydari, Wamiqa Gabbi and Ram Kapoor. Set during the late-1940s and early-1950s, during the partition of India, the series is a fictionalized story exploring the lives of studio owners, stars and two aspiring individuals as they navigate ambition, betrayal and love in the Hindi film industry.

The idea of Jubilee was originated in late-2013 as Motwane discussed with his partners in Phantom Studios on the popularity of web series and this prompted to develop a story set during the golden period of Hindi cinema in the 1940s and 1950s. Motwane discussed with Atul Sabharwal to create a story based on his idea, while providing additional inputs from Hartej Sawhney and Nishant Agarwal, and had several real life incidents being fictionalized for the narrative. Following an extensive pre-production and casting process, along with the delays of COVID-19 pandemic, the series was shot from December 2021 to early 2022 in a span of 90 days. It was filmed by Pratik Shah, edited by Aarti Bajaj and scored by Alokananda Dasgupta, while also featuring a soundtrack composed by Amit Trivedi and written by Kausar Munir.

Jubilee was premiered in two parts with the first five episodes premiering first on 7 April 2023 and the remaining five episodes being premiered a week later. The series' received acclaim for the story, screenplay, direction, performances and the technical aspects which helped in recreating the period era, but received criticism for the length and writing of female characters. It received nine Filmfare OTT Awards, three Indian Television Academy Awards and an Asian Academy Creative Award amongst other accolades.

== Plot ==
Exactly a month before the Partition of India, bonafide producer Shrikant Roy, who owns the studio Roy Talkies, in Bombay, is in search of a new actor to debut in his latest film, Sunghursh, as the protagonist. He hopes to give the pseudonym, 'Madan Kumar', to the performer selected. A theatre actor, Jamshed Khan, is selected. Jamshed is in an extra-marital affair with Sumitra Kumari, a high-profile Bollywood actress and Roy's wife. They both plan to run away to Karachi. Binod Das, the projector boy of Roy Talkies and Roy's right-hand man, is sent to Lucknow to bring both Jamshed and Sumitra back to the studio.

On the train ride to Lucknow, Binod meets playwright Jay Khanna, Jamshed's best friend, whose family own a theater company in Karachi. Binod tries to convince Kumari to go back to Bombay with him, but she remains steadfast in her decision and does not budge. Binod meets Jamshed, who is about to act in a theater production of Hamlet, using a different alias. He indirectly threatens Jamshed of the repercussions of not acting in Roy's new film. Soon, Jamshed sneaks out of the theater to leave for Karachi by train. When riots break out as a result of announcing the Partition, Jamshed is unable to find a ride to the train station. Binod offers him a ride, however, not before Jamshed comes upon Binod's true identity. Jamshed attacks Binod, causing the car to swerve out of control and crash in the street. Binod extricates himself from the wreck, leaving Jamshed trapped inside.

Revealing his plans to take up the mantle of Madan Kumar for himself, Binod beats Jamshed unconscious. However, a group of rioters come upon them, and Binod manages to escape before he is found by Jay. With Binod and Jay watching from a nearby alleyway, the rioters attack Jamshed, beating him senseless before carrying him away and killing him. Upon returning to Bombay, Binod tells everyone that Jamshed went to Karachi. When questioned by Roy, he succeeds in distracting him by auditioning in front of him. Highly impressed, Binod is selected for the role and given the screen name of ‘Madan Kumar’. But Sumitra Kumari is suspicious of him, and unsuccessfully attempts to sabotage Binod's screen test. Roy managed to get photographs of Binod beating Jamshed unconscious in Lucknow, which he keeps. Meanwhile, Jay, whose family has lost their theater company and house in Karachi, come to Bombay as refugees. He aspires to make it big as a director with his story, Taxi Driver, for which he wanted to cast Jamshed. He falls in love with the tawaif, Niloufer.

Jay's script is rejected by Roy, solely for the hero being poor. He then tries to narrate it to Roy's financer, Shamsher Walia, but gets rejected again, as Walia does not want to produce films. After Roy and he get into a fight, Jay confronts Walia for his inability to take risks. Walia agrees and produces Jay's film, helping him create his own studio. Jay and Walia are eventually pitted against Roy and Madan Kumar. After Taxi Driver is released to rave reviews, Madan tries to get Niloufer on his side by casting her in his next film, Raj Mahal. She is more than happy as she admires Madan. They begin an affair, which Jay soon learns of. He later has a public spat with Madan, which makes it into the news.

Jay, in turn, takes Sumitra Kumari as the heroine for his next film, Baiju Awara. The film is a runaway hit, for its instant connection with the middle class, while Raj Mahal flops badly, as Roy changed the story last minute to suit Madan and Niloufer's real-life scandal. Jay becomes a huge star. Pratap Singh, a teacher who had helped Jay after the partition and now works in his studio wants to get him married to his daughter Kiran. But Jay still loves Niloufer and comforts her after her split from Madan. He's also mesmerized by the new technology of cinemascope that is about to get introduced by Roy. Roy invites him to work with him but Walia is against it as the film would involve American technology and Jay is in an agreement with the Soviet government.

Madan meets with the Soviet representatives, promising them that his younger brother Naren Das will play the lead role in their propaganda films under his aegis. To break free of Roy Talkies, Madan uses a fake government letter to persuade Roy (a frequent gambler) to invest all of Roy Talkies' money into cotton stocks, then alerts the Income Tax Department. The police subsequently raid Roy Talkies and place Roy under arrest. Distraught at Madan's betrayal, Roy kills himself, but before doing so prepares an envelope for Sumitra. Within the envelope, Sumitra finds photographs which prove that Madan killed Jamshed. Madan is charged with murder which tarnishes his image. Jay is called to court as a witness, but he lies as a pay-off for Madan saving him during the riots and their earlier friendship, claiming that Madan was trying to rescue Jamshed Khan from the car and only knocked him unconsciousness so he would not suffer a painful death at the hands of the rioters. A distraught Sumitra commits suicide.

A phone call of Jay and Niloufer gets recorded by the Soviets, in which Jay admits that Madan did not try to rescue Jamshed and instead left him to die. Pratap Singh uses the call to blackmail Jay, and to save his studio and career he marries Kiran, abandoning Niloufer in Pune. Binod retires from acting and leaves Bombay with his wife, while his younger brother Naren runs away from home and becomes a beggar on the streets of Bombay. With both its owners dead, Roy Talkies is shut down.

== Cast ==
- Prosenjit Chatterjee as Srikant Roy
- Aditi Rao Hydari as Sumitra Kumari, Roy's wife
- Aparshakti Khurana as Binod Das / Madan Kumar
- Sidhant Gupta as Jay Khanna
- Nandish Sandhu as Jamshed Khan
- Wamiqa Gabbi as Niloufer "Nilo" Qureshi, a tawaif, prostitute and film actress
- Ram Kapoor as Shamsher Singh Walia
- Shweta Basu Prasad as Ratna Das, Binod's wife
- Sukhmanee Lamba as Kiran Singh Sethi
- Arun Govil as Narain Khanna, Jay's father
- Aarya Bhatta as Nanik Jotwani
- Ajay Dutta as Hemant Ganguly
- Tushar Phulke as Janak Mehta
- Narottam Bain as Maqsood
- Alok Arora as Raghu Jhalani
- Harish Chhabra as R. N. Mullick
- Madhu Sachdeva as Bhagwanti Khanna, Jay's mother
- Chirag Katrecha as Naren Das, Binod's brother
- Pankaj Jha Kashyap as Lucknow Inspector
- Edward Sonnenblick as Vladimir Sayadyants
- Akshay Batchu as Shyam Khanna, Jay's younger brother
  - Aryavart Mishra as Young Shyam
- Suhani Popli as Meena Devi, Niloufer's friend
- Ashok Banthia as Pratap Singh Sethi, Kiran's father
- Amit Trivedi as a singer in the song "Dil Jahan Pe Le Chala" (cameo)

== Episodes ==
No.	Title	Directed by	Written by	Original release date
1	"Aag"	Vikramaditya Motwane	Atul Sabharwal and Soumik Sen	7 April 2023
Studio owner Srikant Roy discovers that his wife Sumitra is having an affair with the studio’s upcoming star, Jamshed Khan. Roy sends his loyal lab assistant Binod to Lucknow to bring them both back, urgently. Binod finds a unique way to get his boss what he wants.
2	"Sunghursh"	Vikramaditya Motwane	Atul Sabharwal and Soumik Sen	7 April 2023
Roy gambles on his new star. Binod navigates the way around his new life. Sumitra refuses to let go of Jamshed. Jay arrives in Bombay and is forced to take up a life of crime. Niloufer moves to Bombay but gets caught in a dangerous situation.
3	"Dosti"	Vikramaditya Motwane	Atul Sabharwal and Soumik Sen	7 April 2023
Jay goes job-hunting and is reunited with an old friend. Niloufer creates her own opportunities. Nanik Jotwani and Roy begin a revolutionary venture. Roy's distribution gamble on Sunghursh fails. Binod's newfound stardom is threatened by a surprise twist.
4	"Junoon"	Vikramaditya Motwane	Atul Sabharwal and Soumik Sen	7 April 2023
Binod is blackmailed. Niloufer and Jay rekindle their friendship. Jotwani introduces Roy to some new, powerful friends. Roy protects Binod from catastrophe, at the cost of Jay's career.
5	"Baazi"	Vikramaditya Motwane	Atul Sabharwal and Soumik Sen	7 April 2023
An international propaganda tussle begins at Roy Talkies. Jay is determined to start his own studio, but has to make a huge personal sacrifice in order to. Binod backs out of a commitment, and creates an enemy in the process.
6	"Naya Daur"	Vikramaditya Motwane	Atul Sabharwal and Soumik Sen	14 April 2023
Binod is haunted by memories of Lucknow. Jay struggles to shoot his film. Niloufer makes a big decision. Sumitra finally finds a lead in her search for justice.
7	"Raasta"	Vikramaditya Motwane	Atul Sabharwal and Soumik Sen	14 April 2023
Niloufer meets the man of her dreams. A heartbroken Jay decides to move on. Binod and Niloufer start shooting for Rajmahal. Jay and Binod get into a brawl. Sumitra reveals Binod’s secret to the press.
8	"Intezaar"	Vikramaditya Motwane	Atul Sabharwal and Soumik Sen	14 April 2023
Roy reshoots Rajmahal to save the film from scandal. Rajmahal's failure has surprising consequences for Jay. Niloufer's heartbreak leads her into the arms of another. Roy makes Jay an offer he can’t refuse, leading Jay to destroy a friendship.
9	"Bewafa"	Vikramaditya Motwane	Atul Sabharwal and Soumik Sen	14 April 2023
Sumitra finds a witness. Binod prepares for the greatest betrayal of his life. Jay jeopardises his future. Roy leaves Sumitra a surprise gift.
10	"Jubilee"	Vikramaditya Motwane	Atul Sabharwal and Soumik Sen	14 April 2023
Sumitra takes Binod to court. Binod summons a shock witness. Jay's plans to elope are put to the test. As the drama of the series is resolved, the characters find their own paths moving forward.

== Production ==
=== Development ===
The idea of Jubilee originated during late-2013 when Motwane discussed with his partners at Phantom Films regarding the legacy of popular television shows such as Game of Thrones and Breaking Bad and felt that they spoke more about these shows than the films being made, which in turn led him to think about developing a series that focused on the golden age of Indian film industry. He then shared his idea to Atul Sabharwal to develop a story for the project. While Motwane was directing Sacred Games for Netflix. Sabharwal then wrote 10 drafts for the scripts for each episode within one year, as each draft for an episode takes around 2–3 days for writing specifically. Motwane who had likened Sabharwal's story had pitched a pilot episode for Amazon Prime Video who had officially greenlit the project. Motwane claimed that Aparna Purohit, the head of Amazon India originals had been supporitve in making the series, and the executives of Amazon and the crew also shared positive feedback for the project.

"It’s the stories you hear… There is some truth, some gossip and everything put into this. Today (who’s to say) what’s true, what’s made up and what’s an urban legend that’s taken a life of its own to become stories that we hear almost 70-75 years after the era… It’s a wonderful way of presenting it to the audience"

— Vikramaditya Motwane on Jubilee

Motwane's liking to the film's of the 1940s and 1950s era, and celebrities who were popular in that era Raj Kapoor, Guru Dutt, Vijay Anand, Dilip Kumar, Dev Anand, Ashok Kumar, Nargis and Madhubala, led him to set this period for the series. He also considered the ambitions of the storytelling and creative ideas fleshed out during that time, excited them, prompting to create a fictional world for the series similar to Mad Men. However, he did not want to focus on the echo-chambery of the films or too reliant on in-jokes but instead focus on a character-driven narrative.

Motwane considered the story to be partly urban legend and from stories that people had heard of "how certain directors worked in the past or how a certain actor had to leave for a certain reason". Later he also documented the geo-political situations in that period, the conditions in the refugee camps soon after partition and the Russian-American influences and how Russians being fascinated with Indian cinema also helped in shaping the narrative. Sanghamitra Chatterjee, co-founder of Past Perfect Heritage Management, also involved in the pre-production sharing her ideas and insights of India during the 1940s and 1950s through a coffee table book. Motwane added that a lot of research has been went on recreating the period from vehicles, locations, sets, music and other elements. The second season was greenlit after the first season's success, but in 2024, it was reported to be cancelled owing to budget constraints, though Wamiqa Gabbi, a year later, had clarified that the season was still in writing stage.

=== Casting ===
Motwane needed established actors for the roles Srikant Roy and Sumitra Kumari, hence Prosenjit Chatterjee and Aditi Rao Hydari were cast without an audition, as was Ram Kapoor for Shamsher Singh Walia. Motwane liked Prosenjit's performance in Chokher Bali (2003) which resulted in his involvement, as he was considered interesting for Srikant's role. Prosenjit added that Srikant Roy was seen as a villain but did not due to the multitude of shades while expressing the character's internal conflicts that led him to work more on the character. Regarding Aditi, Motwane said that as she played a lot of fragile characters, "to play somebody the exact opposite, who’s a bit of a badass and going through massive turmoil was interesting". Aditi referenced Rachel Weisz's performance from The Favourite (2018) to study about Kumari's character.

For the rest of the actors, he had held auditions, which included for roles of parallel and supporting artists. Casting Bay handled the auditions. Sidhant Gupta had auditioned multiple times for the role of Jay Khanna, before being finalised. Motwane noted that Sidhant had the "pure intensity which he brought to the table. There was something really interesting about this guy with fire in his eyes. That little bit of fire and pain." To prepare for his role, Gupta refrained from watching black and white films at that time as the acting was poetic but instead researched about the partition of India for character study.

Motwane was initially unsure on Aparshakti Khurana for the role of Binod, but was later "blown away" by his audition. Khurana added that Binod's character was also personal to him owing to journey as a costume stylist and then as a television host before acting in Hindi cinema. Initially, Wamiqa Gabbi was earlier auditioned for Nilofer, but Motwane insisted to choose another actor for the role. As the filming was interrupted due to the pandemic, Motwani had to rework the casting process during which he saw Gabbi's Instagram Reels and was impressed by her sense of humour. Hence, he re-auditioned her for Nilofer which was later finalised.

=== Filming ===
Filming for Jubilee was intended to begin in April 2020 but was delayed due to the COVID-19 pandemic lockdown. After extensive pre-production works and casting changes, principal photography eventually commenced in December 2021 and continued till early-2022. The film was shot in a span of 90 days as most of the scenes were shot at sets in Mumbai except for the steam engine and station sequences which were shot in Sri Lanka due to their period-friendly aesthetics that prompted them to shoot them efficiently without visual effects. According to Motwane, he felt that he did not "get as much time when you are doing a series", hence he had to plan a clockwork that can be able to maximise the timeframe, while also maintaining the period aesthetic.

=== Design ===
==== Sets ====
Aparna Sud and Mukund Gupta served as the production designers. Much of the work went on designing the sets, props and aesthetics, in order to replicate the 1940s and 1950s era. It was challenging for Motwane, to replicate that in the modern era thereby resulting them to build sets from scratch to create authenticity and follow the Art Deco method owing to budget constraints. Much of the structures such as the studio lot of Roy Talkies, Majestic Hotel, Empire Cinema were created from scratch including the streets of 1940s. Motwane revealed that a whole set was oriented for a single bicycle shot to have a "grand opening shot where you see him cycling, then as you turn the corner you reveal the movie theatre".

To provide contrast from the world of cinema and reality happening in refugee camps, several changes were made in design, especially in shooting those scenes, where they used Steadicam for those sequences while the sequences happening Roy Talkies utilized trolleys and dolly shots. The scenes within cinema halls were filmed in Liberty, Alfred, Maratha Mandir and Vishal Talkies, as constructing a real set of theatre to film was practically unfeasible and expensive. The team refrained from the use of blue and went ahead with warm colors that provided subdued ambience and less saturation. The team practically used yellow bulbs in the offices and mirrors, while lanterns and firelight were used in the refugee camps.

==== Costumes and makeup ====
Shruti Kapoor was the costume designer while Serina Tixiera served as the makeup artist. For Srikant Roy, Motwane had referenced Marcello Mastroianni from 8½ (1963) for the character's looks as "he was gorgeous with his shirts and waistcoats and slicked-back hair. It was so specific in our heads". The costumes and attire were also specific on reflecting the character's attitude as a rich person, which Shruti added: "Roy is a powerful man. He always has to assert his superiority—that’s why we never see him in casual clothing." Sumitra Kumari's character had a reference to Audrey Hepburn and Gayatri Devi because of the former's "sense of fragility" and the latter, "was one of the first people who was a queen and would wear men's clothes—trousers and shirts" which was bold for that time. Shruti had designed several printed chifforns and organza saris to replicate Gayatri's costumes, but shown mild variations to not replicate it too much. One of the standouts of her look, featured a lone-off shoulder dress that had multiple iterations, until they settled for a heavily embroidered organza fabric, which was created by Surya Sarkar.

Das' character goes from a lab architect to a film star. Hence, not only the costumes, but the looks also had to be varied to emulate that. In the beginning, he was seen wearing dark earthy colours, and a white dhoti-kurta but after he becomes a film star named Madan Kumar, he wears pants, blazer and crisp shirts. Shruti said, "When we see him as Madan Kumar, in a dark brown and mustard suit, complete with oversized sunglasses – it’s a sign that he has made it–he has switched from the staff quarter to the star quarter." Khanna's character was tough for Kapoor to design costumes, as his character begins from pinnacle and then he loses his fame, resulting him to underplay his looks style-wise from the first episode. Sidhant said he had to wear oversized shirts and high-waisted costumes, thus making him walk differently and changes his style as well. For Khanna's first scene, Shruti created about 25 jackets for the character.

Nilofer's costumes range from anarkali and salwar kameez to trouser-shirts, defining her character. Gabbi's green anarkali which she wore in the first scene was reference to Madhuri Dixit's character Devdas (2002) according to fashion blogs, but Shruti denied it as the color worked well with the background dancers' cream-gold outfits. Much of the other accessories were bought from Chor Bazaar, Mumbai, including Srikant's oversized tortoise-shell sunglasses.

=== Music ===
Jubilee features a 12-song soundtrack and original score composed by Alokananda Dasgupta and Amit Trivedi, Motwane's previous collaborators. Trivedi had composed the soundtrack along with Anvita Dutt's Qala (2022), being set in the same 1940s to 1950s period as Jubilee. Kausar Munir wrote lyrics for all the songs, whom being an avid fan of the 1950s Hindi film music and followed the melodies and the script, instead of extensively researching it. The entire soundtrack was recorded live. Dasgupta also went ahead with an orchestral scoring, utilizing strings, brass, horns, clarinets and whistles, and drew with the classic melodies to get the periodic feel. The soundtrack album was released on 24 March 2023, while Dasgupta's score was also released on 10 May, both being distributed under the T-Series label.

== Marketing and release ==
In April 2022, Amazon Prime Video announced Jubilee as one amongst the 40 other Indian original titles to be launched during their inaugural "Prime Video Presents India" showcase. A first look and teaser trailer was launched on 17 March 2023, followed by the official trailer was then released on 24 March at a high-profile event in Mumbai.

The first five episodes of Jubilee was released on 7 April 2023, while the remaining five episodes premiered on 14 April. This strategy was designed to immerse the audience into the world-building and attention to detail for the authenticity of the period as well as maintaining audience engagement for two weeks during the release.

== Reception ==
Shubhra Gupta of The Indian Express added that many of the characters "feel both filmi and flesh-and-blood, old-timey yet faintly recognizable, a combo that only cinema lovers can pull off" and added that the entire team "had worked in tandom [...] to create perfectly-judged, knowledgeable, affectionate nostalgia". She concluded that Motwane "has delivered in spades, and raised the bar high". Saibal Chatterjee of NDTV wrote "A celebration, a homage and a lament rolled into one, Jubilee shines a light on the breakthroughs and creative adventures that paved the way for one of Hindi cinema's most happening phases. As much heart as craft, it is a true-blue dazzler, an accomplishment that demonstrates what is possible when art and soul come together in a near-perfect fusion." Tushar Joshi of India Today wrote "Jubilee is not your sit-down fast food experience. It’s like a slow cooked dish that has simmered with all the garnishes to taste divine. Watch it for Motwane’s brilliant direction and a journey into the long lost world of the birth of movies and the politics of acting." Titas Chowdhury of News18 wrote "Go for Jubilee if you’re a true-blue cinema lover. While it may not leave you in complete awe, it will nudge you to rejoice and indulge in the good old Bollywood charm, that has brightened up our gloomy days and inspired us to dream big."

Shilajit Mitra of The Hindu wrote "Jubilee is long and lustrous. Like Rocket Boys, it attempts to tell a story of India by zooming in on one of its defining institutions [...] For 10 episodes of considerable length, Jubilee circles these characters and their shifting fortunes at or beyond Roy Talkies. It gets exhausting; the characters, though well-written and performed, lack the snap and bite of a truly gripping ensemble. More involving, then, is the finer detailing around the edges of the story." Nandini Ramnath of Scroll.in wrote "The lavishly produced series is seething with remarkable period detail [...] and filmed as grandly as a movie, Jubilee puts on an excellent show at all times. Clever flourishes in a formulaic price-of-fame saga survive the contrived gravitas and determined joylessness." Vinamra Mathur of Firstpost wrote, "Jubilee is the most striking show in recent times, and what add more colors to the show are the final five episodes; far darker, deeper, and more complex than the first five." Ronak Kotecha of The Times of India wrote, "even with so much going on, ‘Jubilee’ keeps its audience hooked with its bewitching old world charm and performances to match."

Soumya Srivatsava of Hindustan Times wrote "Jubilee can be a long, long watch about movies, rivalry, jealousy, scandal and hard earned success. However, some snoozy bits will struggle hard for your attention and the rare bad music from Amit Trivedi could add to the disappointment. But brilliant performances by Sidhant and Wamiqa are worth investing some time in." Sanchita Jhunjhunwala of Times Now wrote "If you are looking to watch a show that speaks to the cinema lover inside you, then this show is a definitely must watch. Jubilee is everything that we love to watch and while it does focus on its story, does not compromise on performances, or any other aspect, it is still bingeworthy." Suparna Sharma of Rolling Stone India wrote "Jubilee is prestige TV mounted on a grand scale. The show’s politics is clear-eyed and sharp, and the series has some exceptional performances, including the joyous discovery of Sidhant Gupta, but for about four episodes in the middle, I struggled to stay with it or care about its characters. That’s because its ambition is skewed, leaning more towards creating seductive beauty with an alienating obsessiveness."

The writing of the female characters, however, was subjected to criticism with Film Companion's Deepanjana Pai said that "the only role for women appears to be to look pretty while being tragic victims". Though she praised Niloufer's character arc, she also noted that the series had reiterated the character's "seductive charm, rather than her professional aspirations or talent". She also had similar opinions on Sumitra's character adding that despite being shown as a star actor, "there’s not one scene in the entire series that shows Sumitra performing that role" and her character did not have the dynamics of Devika Rani, whom Sumitra was modelled while seen as a "tragedy queen". Debashree Mukherjee of The Wire also noted the absence of showcasing the female pioneers that changed the industry, and mounting the narrative on Srikant, Binod and Jay, adding "the producers seem to prefer female suffering over female success, even if many women were bigger stars than men." She further concluded, "One of my favourite moments in Jubilee is when at end of Episode 2 we see Nilofer walking bare feet at Independence Day celebrations on the streets of Bombay, lustily drinking straight from a bottle, and laughing at gawking men. Here we have a rare moment of lightness in a show that is unduly burdened by the seriousness of its own mythmaking masculinist agenda. For me, this Nilofer embodies that brief interlude in South Asia’s film history when some women of the entertainment world enjoyed a rare creative freedom and a lightness of being."

== Accolades ==
Award	Date of ceremony	Category	Nominee / work	Result	Ref.
Asian Academy Creative Awards	7 December 2023	Best Cinematography	Pratik Shah	Won	
Bollywood Hungama OTT India Fest	20 October 2023	Best Series	Jubilee	Won	
Bollywood Hungama OTT India Fest	20 October 2023	Best Director	Vikramaditya Motwane	Nominated	
Bollywood Hungama OTT India Fest	20 October 2023	Best Actor – Male	Sidhant Gupta	Nominated	
Bollywood Hungama OTT India Fest	20 October 2023	Best Actor – Female	Aditi Rao Hydari	Nominated	
Bollywood Hungama OTT India Fest	20 October 2023	Best Actor – Female (Popular)	Aditi Rao Hydari	Nominated	
Bollywood Hungama OTT India Fest	20 October 2023	Best Breakthrough Performer	Aparshakti Khurana	Won	
Bollywood Hungama OTT India Fest	20 October 2023	Best Breakthrough Performer	Wamiqa Gabbi	Nominated	
Bollywood Hungama OTT India Fest	20 October 2023	Best Director of the Year (People's Choice)	Vikramaditya Motwane	Nominated	
Bollywood Hungama OTT India Fest	20 October 2023	Best Original Series of the Year (People's Choice)	Jubilee	Nominated	
Bollywood Hungama OTT India Fest	20 October 2023	Game Changing Actress of the Year	Wamiqa Gabbi	Nominated	
Bollywood Hungama OTT India Fest	20 October 2023	Most Powerful OTT Debut of the Year	Sidhant Gupta	Won	
Bollywood Hungama OTT India Fest	20 October 2023	Iconic Performer of the Year	Aditi Rao Hydari	Won	
Critics Choice Shorts and Series Awards	13 March 2024	Best Web Series	Jubilee	Nominated	
Critics Choice Shorts and Series Awards	13 March 2024	Best Director	Vikramaditya Motwane	Won	
Critics Choice Shorts and Series Awards	13 March 2024	Best Actress	Wamiqa Gabbi	Nominated	
Critics Choice Shorts and Series Awards	13 March 2024	Best Supporting Actor	Sidhant Gupta	Won	
Critics Choice Shorts and Series Awards	13 March 2024	Best Supporting Actress	Aditi Rao Hydari	Nominated	
Critics Choice Shorts and Series Awards	13 March 2024	Best Writing	Atul Sabharwal	Nominated	
Filmfare OTT Awards	26 November 2023	Best Drama Series	Jubilee	Nominated	
Filmfare OTT Awards	26 November 2023	Best Director in a Drama Series	Vikramaditya Motwane	Won	
Filmfare OTT Awards	26 November 2023	Best Actor in a Drama Series	Aparshakti Khurana	Nominated	
Filmfare OTT Awards	26 November 2023	Best Actor in a Drama Series	Sidhant Gupta	Nominated	
Filmfare OTT Awards	26 November 2023	Best Actress in a Drama Series	Wamiqa Gabbi	Nominated	
Filmfare OTT Awards	26 November 2023	Best Supporting Actor in a Drama Series	Prosenjit Chatterjee	Nominated	
Filmfare OTT Awards	26 November 2023	Best Original Story (Series)	Atul Sabharwal and Soumik Sen	Nominated	
Filmfare OTT Awards	26 November 2023	Best Original Screenplay (Series)	Atul Sabharwal	Nominated	
Filmfare OTT Awards	26 November 2023	Best Original Dialogue (Series)	Atul Sabharwal	Nominated	
Filmfare OTT Awards	26 November 2023	Best Background Music (Series)	Alokananda Dasgupta	Won	
Filmfare OTT Awards	26 November 2023	Best Original Soundtrack (Series)	Amit Trivedi	Won	
Filmfare OTT Awards	26 November 2023	Best Production Design (Series)	Aparna Sud and Mukund Gupta	Won	
Filmfare OTT Awards	26 November 2023	Best Cinematographer (Series)	Pratik Shah	Won	
Filmfare OTT Awards	26 November 2023	Best Costume Design (Series)	Shruti Kapoor	Won	
Filmfare OTT Awards	26 November 2023	Best VFX (Series)	Arpan Gaglani (Philmcgi)	Won	
Filmfare OTT Awards	26 November 2023	Best Editing (Series)	Aarti Bajaj	Won	
Filmfare OTT Awards	26 November 2023	Best Sound Design (Series)	Kunal Sharma, Dhruv Parekh	Won	
Indian Film Festival of Melbourne	11 August 2023	Best Actor in a Series	Prosenjit Chatterjee	Nominated	
Indian Film Festival of Melbourne	11 August 2023	Best Actor in a Series	Aparshakti Khurana	Nominated	
Indian Film Festival of Melbourne	11 August 2023	Best Actor in a Series	Sidhant Gupta	Nominated	
Indian Film Festival of Melbourne	11 August 2023	Best Actress in a Series	Wamiqa Gabbi	Nominated	
Indian Film Festival of Melbourne	11 August 2023	Best Series	Jubilee	Won	
Indian Television Academy Awards	11 December 2023	Best Actor – Popular (OTT)	Aparshakti Khurana	Nominated	
Indian Television Academy Awards	11 December 2023	Best Actress – Popular (OTT)	Aditi Rao Hydari	Won	
Indian Television Academy Awards	11 December 2023	Best DOP – OTT	Pratik Shah	Won	
Indian Television Academy Awards	11 December 2023	Best Costume Design – OTT	Shruti Kapoor	Won	
Indian Television Academy Awards	11 December 2023	Best Dialogue – OTT	Atul Sabharwal	Nominated	
News18 Reel Awards	11 March 2024	Best Web Series	Jubilee	Won	
News18 Reel Awards	11 March 2024	Best Actor	Prosenjit Chatterjee	Nominated	
News18 Reel Awards	11 March 2024	Best Actress	Wamiqa Gabbi	Nominated	
News18 Reel Awards	11 March 2024	Star of the Year (Female) – OTT	Wamiqa Gabbi	Won	
News18 Reel Awards	11 March 2024	Best Ensemble Cast	Jubilee	Nominated	
OTTPlay Awards	29 October 2023	Best Web Series	Jubilee	Nominated	
OTTPlay Awards	29 October 2023	Most Promising Actor on OTT	Aparshakti Khurana	Nominated	
OTTPlay Awards	29 October 2023	Most Promising Actress on OTT	Wamiqa Gabbi	Nominated	
OTTPlay Awards	29 October 2023	Best Supporting Actor in a Series	Prosenjit Chatterjee	Won	
OTTPlay Awards	29 October 2023	Breakthrough Performance of the Year – Male	Sidhant Gupta	Won	
OTTPlay Awards	29 October 2023	Versatile Performer – Male	Wamiqa Gabbi	Won	
OTTPlay Awards	29 October 2023	Breaking the Mould	Aparshakti Khurana	Won	
OTTPlay Awards	29 October 2023	OTT Performer of the Year – Female	Aditi Rao Hydari	Won	
Times of India OTT Awards	28 July 2024	Best Actress in a Series	Aditi Rao Hydari	Nominated	
Times of India OTT Awards	28 July 2024	Best Actor in a Series	Aparshakti Khurana	Nominated	
Times of India OTT Awards	28 July 2024	Acting Excellence in a Series – Male	Aparshakti Khurana	Nominated	
Times of India OTT Awards	28 July 2024	Acting Excellence in a Supporting Role in a Series – Male	Prosenjit Chatterjee	Nominated	
Times of India OTT Awards	28 July 2024	Drama Series of the Year	Jubilee	Won	

== See also ==
- List of Amazon India originals
- List of Amazon Prime Video original programming
