= Are You Listening! =

Bangladeshi film

- Theatrical release poster
- শুনতে কি পাও!
- Directed by: Kamar Ahmad Simon
- Produced by: Sara Afreen
- Cinematography: Kamar Ahmad Simon; Sheikh Rajibul Islam
- Edited by: Saikat Sekhareswar Ray
- Distributed by: Journeyman Pictures
- Release dates: 29 October 2012 (55th DOK Leipzig); 21 February 2014 (Bangladesh)
- Running time: 90 minutes
- Country: Bangladesh
- Language: Bangla

Are You Listening! (Original title in Bengali: শুনতে কি পাও!) is a Bangladeshi fiction-non-fiction film written-directed by Kamar Ahmad Simon and produced by Sara Afreen. The "OPENING FILM" of Open Doors Screening at LOCARNO Film Festival, 'Are You Listening!' has been invited to more than 40 International Festivals including "OFFICIAL SELECTION" of 25th IDFA, the largest documentary festival of the world and "OPENING FILM" of 55th Dok Leipzig, the oldest documentary festival. It was also exhibited on special occasions of Conference of Youth (COY) in Paris, Royal Anthropological Institute (RAI) London, Cinema Louxor in Paris, Stadkino Basel in Switzerland and many more.

In a rare move as a fiction-non-fiction, it was released in theatre in Bangladesh on 21 February 2014 in Bashundhara Star Cineplex and successfully ran for four weeks.

In 2015, the film was awarded with Bangladesh National Film Award as the Best Feature (Non-fiction) handed over by Sheikh Hasina, Prime Minister of People's Republic of Bangladesh.

Written, directed and also filmed by Kamar over a span of 20 months living in a remote coastal village (Sundarbans) of Bangladesh, it is an observational cinema inspired in cinéma vérité or direct cinema style, a genre almost missing until now in Bangladesh.

== Development ==
In December 2009, director Kamar Ahmad Simon started traveling the coastal areas of Bangladesh, approximately 200-kilometer stretch from Bhola to Shatkhira on local boat in three months span on and off, completely unplanned. Before his journey, a tidal surge swept away the coasts of Bangladesh. On these trips he made several stops on different locations and engaged with local debates for hours on tea-chats. On coming back to Dhaka, Kamar extracted out of these informal-chats forming a script based on these very characters and locations that led him go back to them again and again. Later in this phase, for script development and production, the film won two competitive Grant Awards from Jan Vrijman Fund in 2010. Kamar also participated in the IDFA Academy Summer School in August same year to develop the idea further, and in 2011 the film idea was awarded as the Best Pitch in Asian Forum for Documentary held in Kolkata.

== Production ==
Initially the film crew was mostly formed of young film enthusiasts due to financing constraints, and the nature of montage the director envisioned. The location was an added challenge since it had no access to basic utilities such as water, electricity or food and the production was executed in a guerrilla warfare style. Sometimes the shooting was planned for a week but wrapped in three days, and sometimes the schedule extended even for three weeks without any pre-planning.

The director was obsessed with his own vision of making the film, and eventually failed to hold-up the team of the young enthusiasts. But the director's adamancy paid off when locals kind of understood the director more than his team, and almost the entire village stood up lending a hand in any way they could support the production. Volunteers from the village were then groomed to assist in the production handling the logistics. The production continued for 20 months with a series of tours made in every other week or month. In between the shooting, the director attempted to contact editors to have an understanding of the film coming up. But the traditional editors from local industry paid less interest due to lack of understanding of Cinema Verite style. Later Kamar came across Saikat Sekharswar Ray, an editor based in Kolkata and a faculty of Satyajit Ray Film and Television Institute and was very impressed with his work. Saikat liked the rush but agreed to edit given that he will work with the entire 170 hours of rush, something that Kamar failed to make the local Bangladeshi editors agree.

The editing was scheduled to start in August 2011, but was halted abruptly with a tragic road accident when Tareque Masud (1956–2011), the finest of filmmakers that Bangladesh has produced till date (The Clay Bird, Cannes 2002, Director's Fortnight, FIEPRESCI Award, Best Film), was killed. Tareque was Kamar's mentor and had a great influence on his film-philosophy. The editing started again in February 2012 when it was invited along with eight other projects in Editing Lab of Berlin Talent Campus, Berlinale 2012. Yet the post-production greatly suffered due to funding crisis until again it won the competitive Grant Award from Visions Sud Est, Switzerland for post-production in 2012.

== Crew ==
- Kamar Ahmad Simon (Writer, Director & cinematographer)
- Sara Afreen (Producer)
- Saikat Sekhareswar Ray (Editor)
- Sukanta Majumdar (Sound Editor & designer)
- Sheikh Rajibul islam (Cinematographer)

== Release ==
The film had its world premiere at the 55th DOK Leipzig in Germany as the ‘Curtain-Opener’ of the festival on 29 October 2012. In a rare move as a documentary, it was released in Bangladesh on 21 February 2014 in Bashundhara Star Cineplex and successfully ran for four weeks. Before that Muktir Gaan by Tareque Masud was the only documentary that was released in theater in Bangladesh after one decade of its making and ran a week.

== Reception ==
The Director of the European Documentary Network (EDN) and Danish film critic Tue Steen Müller wrote about the film in his blog,

A classic humanistic, cinematically brilliant work…brings back memories of the Apu-trilogy of Satyajit Ray.

The 25th International Documentary Film Festival Amsterdam (IDFA) introduced the film as,

A gorgeously shot observational documentary… filming from an unusually low camera angle…

The Jury awarding the ‘Grand Prix’ in the main international competition section of 35th Cinéma du Réel in Paris cited,

With patience and intelligence in a hostile environment Kamar knew how to stay at the good distance of the people...he filmed to build a humanist movie...in the tradition of the feature-length documentary narratives 'Are You Listening!' is a visual symphony and an ode to life.

Dubai based film programmer and critic Özge Calafato wrote in the 2013 spring edition of European documentary magazine, the quarterly DOX,

Strong political content with a distinct artistic vision…doesn't want to be confined to any strict interpretation of the genre.

One of the most popular Bengali newspaper Prothom Alo, with the largest Bangladeshi readership, published the news of winning ‘Grand Prix’ in 35th Cinéma du Réel 2013 in Paris in highlighted box in back page as a national achievement news.

Also, the 15th years anniversary special publication, a coffee table book on Bangladesh's achievement of 15 years between 1998 and 2013’, Prothom Alo mentioned two films – ‘Shunte Ki Pao!’ (Are You Listening!) and Matir Moina (The Clay Bird) by Kamar's mentor Tareque Masud.

== Reviews ==
- Shahaduzzaman, Daily Prothom Alo
- Fahmidul Haque, banglanews24.com
- Anis Pervez, The Daily Star
- Gias Uddin Selim, Daily Samakal
- Jahid Reza Noor, Daily Prothom Alo
- Mahmud Didar, Daily Janakantha

== Awards and accolades ==
1. Best Feature for Best Feature-Length Non-fiction, Bangladesh National Film Award 2013
2. Golden Conch for Best Feature-Length Documentary, Mumbai International Film Festival (MIFF) 2014, India
3. Best Cinematography, Mumbai International Film Festival (MIFF) 2014, India
4. Audience Choice Award, Seattle South Asian Film Festival (SSAFF) 2014, Seattle, USA
5. Grand Prix for Best Feature-Length Documentary, 35th Cinéma du Réel 2013, France
6. Jury Award, Film South Asia 2013, Nepal
7. Opening Night Film, 55th Dok-Leipzig, Germany 2012
8. Grant Award: Distribution, Movies That Matter 2013, Netherlands
9. Editing Lab Project, Campus Studio/ Berlinale 2012, Germany
10. Grant Award: Post-production, Visions Sud Est 2011, Switzerland
11. Best Pitch, DocedgeKolkata, Asian Forum for Documentary 2011, India
12. Grant Award: Script, Jan Vrijman Fund (JVF/ IDFA) 2010, Netherlands
13. Grant Award: Production, Jan Vrijman Fund (JVF/ IDFA) 2010, Netherlands

== Screening ==
Are You Listening!' has been invited to more than 40 International Festivals including "OFFICIAL SELECTION" of 25th IDFA, the largest documentary festival of the world and "OPENING FILM" of 55th Dok Leipzig. It was also exhibited on special occasions of Conference of Youth (COY) in Paris, Royal Anthropological Institute (RAI) London, Cinema Louxor in Paris, Stadkino Basel in Switzerland and many more.

Festival	Category	Result
55th DOK Leipzig 2012, Germany	Opening Film & International Competition	Nominated
25th IDFA 2012, Netherlands	Official Selection: Panorama	
35th Cinéma du Reel, Paris 2013, France	International Competition	Grand Prix
Adana Golden Boll Film Festival 2013, Turkey	Official Selection	
Antenna Documentary Film Festival, Sydney 2013, Australia	International Competition	Nominated
DOK.fest München 2013, Germany	International Competition	Nominated
Erasmus Huis International Documentary Film Festival 2013, Indonesia	Official Selection	
Film South Asia Kathmandu 2013, Nepal	International Competition	Jury Award
Globale Film Festival Berlin 2013, Germany	Official Selection	
Millenium Documentary Film Festival 2013, Belgium	International Competition	Nominated
Patmos International Film Festival 2013, Greece	Official Selection	
PriFilmFest, 2013, Kosovo	Official Selection	
Schlosstheater Moers 2013, Germany	Official Selection	
Take One Action Film Festival 2013, UK	Official Selection	
Yamagata Documentary Film Festival 2013, Japan	New Asian Currents Competition	Nominated
Zagreb Human Rights Film Festival,2013, Croatia	Official Selection	
Abu Dhabi International Documentary Film Festival 2013, Abu Dhabi	International Competition	Nominated
Festival de Films Documentaries de Lasalle 2013, France	Official Selection	
Asiatica Film Mediale 2013, Italy	Official Selection	
Mumbai International Film Festival (MIFF) 2014, India	International Competition	Golden Conch for Best Documentary
Mumbai International Film Festival (MIFF) 2014, India	International Competition	Best Cinematography Award
Dok Leipzig Lake Festival 2014, India	Official Selection	
NALSAR Film Festival, India	Official Selection	
Blede Festival 2014, Slovenia	International Competition	Nominated
Stronger than Fiction Documentary Film Festival 2014, Australia	Official Selection	
Kerala International Documentary & Short Film Festival 2014, India	Official Selection	
Climatefilmfestival: To Future with Love, Stockholm, Sweden	Official Selection	
Chicago South Asian Film Festival 2014, Chicago, USA	Official Selection	
Seattle South Asian Film Festival 2014, Seattle, USA	International Competition	Audience Choice Award
Bangladesh National Film Award 2013	National Competition	Best Feature (Non-fiction)
SemaineIndienne à l'ENS 2014, France	Official Selection	
Festival de l'Oh 2015, France	Official Selection	
Festival International Jean Rouch 2015, France	Official Selection	
Images mouvementées 2015, France	Official Selection	
La Lanterne Magique 2015, France	Official Selection	
Filmhaus Nürnberg 2015, Germany	Official Selection	
Open Doors Screening, Locarno Film Festival 2016, Switzerland	Official Selection	
