= Sidhant Gupta =

Indian actor (born 1989)

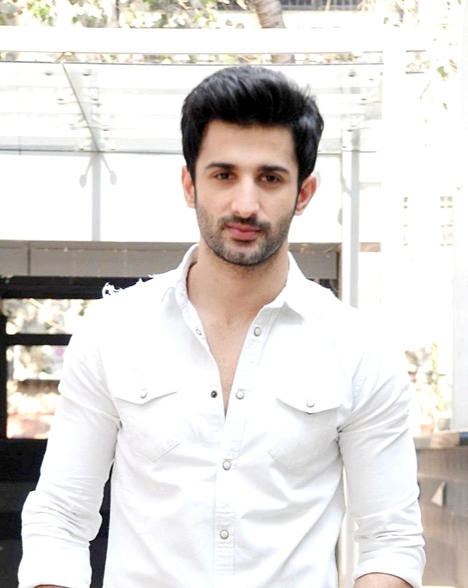
- Gupta in 2017
- Born: 23 April 1989 (age 37); Jammu, Jammu and Kashmir, India
- Occupation: Actor
- Years active: 2012–present

Sidhant Gupta (born 23 April 1989) is an Indian actor who predominantly works in Hindi television and films. He made his film debut in 2012 with Tutiya Dil and starred in Zee TV's soap opera Tashan-e-Ishq (2015–2016) as well as in the films Bhoomi (2017) and Operation Romeo (2022). Gupta has since had leading roles in the streaming series Jubilee (2023) and Freedom at Midnight (2024).

== Personal life ==
Gupta's hometown is in Jammu. He represented J&K in national level under-14 cricket, under-17 swimming and under-19 basketball. Later, he went to Delhi to study for a commercial pilot's license.

His father, Sukesh Gupta, is a retired Jammu forestry official. His mother, Sandhya Gupta, is a well known fashion designer in Jammu and a social activist. He has one older brother, Sanat, who along with his wife Himani, own their own fashion design business in Jammu.

Gupta has stated he is a bit of a recluse and enjoys spending his downtime journalling, singing, cuddling with the love of his life and traveling.

== Career ==
Gupta appeared in commercials for Hero Honda, Clear shampoo, Maruti Suzuki Nano and Close Up. His modelling work include: Wills India Fashion Week 2009 (Varun Bahl), Delhi Fashion Week 2009 (Grand Finale - Rohit Bal), NDTV'S unveiling of the seven wonders of India 2009 (Sabyasachi Mukherjee), Raghavendra Rathore, a cover shoot for India Today, Levi's, Lawrence and Mayo, Times of India, National campaign for a central shopping mall, Tata AIG Life Insurance, Anoos's Beauty Spa, Federal Bank, The Deccan Chronicle, Confetti - Lifestyle Magazine (Cover Page), the Bangalore Marathon, and nternetworks Technology, Studio One.

Gupta has been featured in the 50 Sexiest Asian Men list of the British newspaper Eastern Eye four times from 2016 to 2019.

Gupta made his film debut in Badmashiyaan as the hopeless romantic Dev Arora. In 2015, Gupta continued his acting career in the television seriesTashan-e-Ishq, He then starred in the 2017 film Bhoomi along with Aditi Rao Hydari and Sanjay Dutt. In 2022, he was cast as the lead for the romantic thriller Operation Romeo.

Gupta has since had leading roles in the Amazon Prime Video series Jubilee (2023) and the SonyLIV series Freedom at Midnight (2024). Saibal Chatterjee of NDTV wrote, "Sidhant Gupta, who broke out in the role of a budding filmmaker in Vikramaditya Motwane's Jubilee, adds another feather to his cap with his performance as Pandit Jawaharlal Nehru."

== Filmography ==
Key
†	Denotes films that have not yet been released

=== Films ===
Year	Title	Role	Notes	Ref.
2012	Tutiya Dil	Vishal Khanna		
2013	Bang Bang Bangkok	Unknown		
2015	Badmashiyaan	Dev Arora		
2017	Bhoomi	Neeraj Mathur		
2022	Operation Romeo	Aditya Sharma		
2027	Dragon †	Bobby Sarkar	Telugu film	

=== Television ===
Year	Title	Role	Notes	Ref.
2015–2016	Tashan-E-Ishq	Kunj Sarna		
2016	Jhalak Dikhhla Jaa 9	Contestant	14th place	
2021	Inside Edge	Imaad Akbar	Season 3	
2023	Jubilee	Jay Khanna		
2024–2026	Freedom at Midnight	Jawaharlal Nehru		
2025	Black Warrant	Charles Sobhraj		
2026	Teen Kauwe †	TBA	Amazon Prime Video series	

=== Music videos ===
Year	Title	Singer	Ref.
2018	"Aye Zindagi"	Sonu Nigam	

== Awards and nominations ==
Year	Award	Category	Work	Result	Ref.
2016	Zee Gold Awards	Best Gold Debut - Male	Tashan-e-Ishq	Nominated	
2016	Zee Gold Awards	Most Popular Jodi (with Jasmin Bhasin)	Tashan-e-Ishq	Nominated	
2023	2023 Filmfare OTT Awards	Best Actor in a Drama series	Jubilee	Nominated	
2024	Bollywood Hungama Style Icons	Most Stylish Mould-Breaking Talent of the Year	—N/a	Nominated	
