= Vidya Rao =

Indian Hindustani classical singer

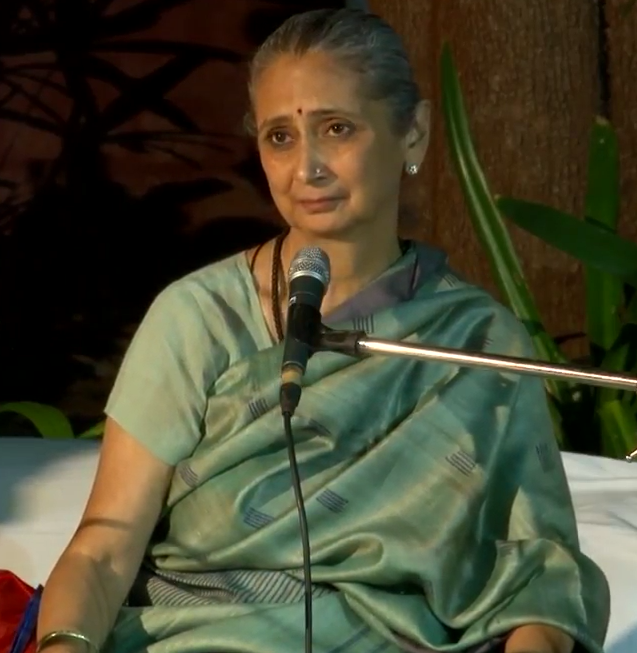
- Vidya Rao in 2016
- Born: Mumbai, India
- Occupations: Singer, writer
- Spouse: Ehsaan Hydari
- Children: Aditi Rao Hydari
- Family: Tyabji–Hydari family

Vidya Rao is an Indian Hindustani classical singer and writer. She is popular for her Thumri and Dadra. She wrote a book on the late Naina Devi, Heart to Heart: Remembering Nainaji. Her daughter Aditi Rao Hydari is an actress.

== Early life ==
Vidya Rao was born in Wanaparthy and grew up in Hyderabad. She did her graduation from Madras and later joined the Delhi School of Economics to do M.A. in Sociology.

Her mother, Shanta Rameshwar Rao, was the founder of Vidyaranya High School in Hyderabad and chairperson of the publishing house Orient Blackswan, established by her father Raja J. Rameshwar Rao, an Indian lawyer, diplomat, member of parliament, book publisher and the titular Raja of Wanaparthy.

== Career ==
She worked with Centre for Women's Development Studies as a researcher for five years before quitting to concentrate on music.

She renders poetry of mystics like, Amir Khusro, Kabir etc.

She was set to make her acting debut through Mani Ratnam's Raavanan (2010) as the mother of Aishwarya Rai's character. However, her scenes were cut from the film's final version.

== Personal life ==
She was married to Ehsaan Hydari. They have a daughter, Tollywood and Bollywood actress, Aditi Rao Hydari.
