= The Foundling (album) =

Studio album by Mary Gauthier
- Released: June 14, 2010
- Studios: The Clubhouse, Toronto
- Genres: Country, Folk
- Length: 46:20
- Label: In the Black
- Producer: Michael Timmins

Mary Gauthier chronology
Genesis (The Early Years) (2008)	The Foundling (2010)	Live at Blue Rock (2012)

The Foundling is the seventh studio album by country artist Mary Gauthier.

== Track listing ==
All tracks composed by Mary Gauthier; except where indicated

No.	Title	Writer(s)	Length
1.	"The Foundling"		3:40
2.	"Mama Here, Mama Gone"		4:01
3.	"Good-bye"		4:14
4.	"Sideshow"	Gauthier, Liz Rose	4:17
5.	"Interlude 1"		0:27
6.	"Blood is Blood"	Gauthier, Crit Harmon	5:16
7.	"March 11, 1962"	Gauthier, Liz Rose	5:47
8.	"Walk On the Water"		4:50
9.	"Interlude 2"		0:46
10.	"Sweet Words"		4:17
11.	"The Orphan King"	Gauthier, Ed Romanoff	4:46
12.	"Another Day Borrowed"	Gauthier, Darrell Scott	3:33
13.	"Coda"		0:26
Total length:			46:20

Professional ratings
Aggregate scores
Source	Rating
Metacritic	82/100
Review scores
Source	Rating
AllMusic	4/5 stars
The Guardian	3/5 stars
The Independent	4/5 stars
Mojo	4/5 stars
The New Zealand Herald	3/5 stars
Paste	7.5/10
PopMatters	6/10
Tom Hull	B+
Uncut	5/5 stars

== Personnel ==
- Mary Gauthier - vocals, acoustic guitar
- Jesse O'Brien - Wurlitzer, organ
- Tania Elizabeth - fiddle
- Ray Ferrugia - drums, percussion
- Jaro Czerwinec - accordion
- Danny Ellis - trombone
- Margo Timmins - backing vocals
- Josh Finlayson - guitar, bass, piano on "Mama Here, Mama Gone"; acoustic guitar on "Goodbye"
- Garth Hudson - piano on "Sideshow"; keyboards, accordion on "Interlude 1" and "Interlude 2"
- Ed Romanoff - acoustic guitar on "Blood is Blood" and "The Orphan King"
- Michael Timmins - slide guitar on "March 11, 1962" and "Walk On the Water"
