= J. Rameshwar Rao =

Indian politician (1923–1998)

Janumpally Rameshwar Rao
- Born: 6 February 1923; Madras, British India
- Died: 15 September 1998 (aged 75); Hyderabad, India
- Education: M.A.
- Occupations: Businessman, Diplomat, Politician
- Years active: 1948-
- Spouse: Shanta
- Children: 4 including Vidya Rao
- Relatives: Aditi Rao Hydari – Granddaughter
- Family: Wanaparthy Samsthanam

Member of Parliament
- In office 1957–1977
- Constituency: Mahabhubnagar

Personal details
- Party: Indian National Congress

Janumpally Rameshwar Rao III (1923–1998) was an Indian lawyer, diplomat, member of parliament, book publisher and the titular Raja of Wanaparthy. Rao joined Indian Foreign Service in 1949 and served as commissioner for the Government of India in various African nations. He was elected as a Member of Parliament to the second, third, fourth, and fifth Lok Sabha successively during 1957–1977 from Mahabhubnagar constituency.

== Life sketch ==
Rameshwar Rao III was born on 23 February 1923 in Madras to Raja Krishnadeva Rao and Rani Sarala Devi of the Wanaparthy Samasthanam, belonging to the Motati clan of the Reddy community. Krishna Deva Rao's father was Raja Janumpally Rameshwar Rao II, the Raja of Wanaparthy Samsthanam. Krishna Deva Rao had a brother Ram Dev Rao. Rameshwar Rao III was also the titular Raja of Wanaparthy from 1944 until 1971, when, by the 26th Amendment to the Constitution of India, the privy purses of the princes were abolished and official recognition of their titles came to an end.

He studied at Nizam College, Hyderabad, Madras University, and Bombay University. He established Orient Longman (now Orient Blackswan) as a specifically Indian book publishing company in 1948. He joined the Indian Foreign Service in 1949. He was First Secretary, Indian Commission in Nairobi, 1950–52; acted as Commissioner for the Government of India in East Africa, 1950–51; Commissioner for the Government of India in Gold Coast and Nigeria, 1953–56; previously associated with Socialist Wing of the Congress.

He was a Member of Parliament,

1. Second Lok Sabha, 1957— 62,
2. Third Lok Sabha, 1962–67
3. Fourth Lok Sabha, 1967–70
4. Fifth Lok Sabha, 1971–77,

He was also Member of

1. Indian Delegation to the United Nations, 1958
2. United Nations Conciliation Commission for the Congo, 1960–61
3. Indian Delegation to Afro-Asian Conference in Algiers, 1964–65.

== Personal life ==
He died at the age of 75 years in Hyderabad on 15 September 1998. He is survived by wife Shanta (the founder of the Vidyaranya School), a son and three daughters, including Nandini Rao, journalist and key person at Orient Blackswan. Another daughter, Hindustani singer Vidya Rao, was married to Ehsaan Hydari, from the Tyabji family and they are the parents of actress, Aditi Rao Hydari.
