= Prajapathi =

2006 Indian film

- Directed by: Ranjith
- Written by: Ranjith
- Produced by: Valiyaveettil Siraj
- Starring: Mammootty; Sreenivasan; Siddique; Nedumudi Venu; Thilakan
- Cinematography: Alagappan N.
- Edited by: L. Bhoominathan
- Music by: Thej Mervin
- Production company: Valiyaveettil Movie International
- Distributed by: S Pictures
- Release date: 16 June 2006
- Running time: 145 minutes
- Country: India
- Language: Malayalam

Prajapathi (transl. People's lord) is a 2006 Malayalam-language action drama film written and directed by Ranjith. It stars Mammootty, Sreenivasan, Siddique, Nedumudi Venu and Thilakan. The music was by Tej Manoj. The film marks Aditi Rao Hydari's feature film debut. The film was shot close to Gopichettipalayam in Tamil Nadu.

== Plot ==
Devarmadom Narayanan is accused of killing his father Ramankutty, for being cruel to his loving mother, at the age of 13 and serves a sentence in a juvenile home. When he returns, he becomes leader of the people of Perumalpuram village. He ensures the village is devoid of all wrongdoers by expelling them. His adversaries are his uncle Muppil Kunjambu Nair and wife Indrani. Kunjambu hated Narayanan for killing his brother, although Kunjambu and his eldest son Giri tried in many ways to kill Narayanan. At one point, Giri almost succeeded in nearly killing Narayanan. Narayanan again did not react. He was on good terms with Kunjambu's daughter and his cousin. Giri tries to sell his land in Perumalpuram to some outsider whose arrival, Narayanan knew, would destroy the harmony of the village. That is when Narayanan decides to react.

It turns out that Kunjambu was the one who actually killed his father for their wealth. Narayanan helps Ali Raghavan, the real son of Kunjambu, to gain his birthright. When Giri finds that he is the stepson of Kunjambu, he kills Kunjambu. The family drives him away from home with the help of Narayanan. The rest of the film is about if and how Giri takes revenge on Narayanan. And Giri is defeated by Narayanan during the fight. But unexpectedly, Giri is killed by Kumaran.

== Cast ==
- Mammootty as Adv. Devarmadom Narayanan
- Siddique as Kaliyarmadom Giri, The main antagonist
- Sreenivasan as Ali Raghavan
- Nedumudi Venu as Muppil Kunjambu Nair
- Thilakan as Vellodi
- Aditi Rao Hydari as Savithri
- Sandhya as Vasanthi
- Sai Kumar as MLA Kuttykrishnan
- Seema as Indrani
- Abu Salim as Kaatti a.k.a. Krishnankutty
- Sadiq as Latheef
- Ajith Kollam as Kunjachan
- Maniyanpilla Raju as Kumaran
- Kanya Bharathi as Devaki
- Bheeman Raghu as SP Ramachandran IPS
- Augustine as Rowther
- Kunchan as Nambiar
- T. P. Madhavan as Appa Swami
- Vijayan Karanthoor as Rajappan
- Jayan Cherthala as Jagathan
- K.V. Manjulan as Sugunan
- Bineesh Kodiyeri as Santhosh
- Anil Murali as Peethambaran
- T.S. Raju as Muppil Ramankutty Nair
- T. G. Ravi as Velappan Mooshari
- Rekha as Subhadra
- Salim Kumar as Power Star Manohar/ Manoharan Kumbalangi
- Daisy Bopanna as Film Actress
- V. K. Sreeraman as Gangadhara Menon
- Madhupal as Vijayan, Film Director
- Baburaj as CI Salim
- Ponnambalam as Vanangamudi
- Rajesh Hebbar as Rajmohan, Assistant Director
- Kalabhavan Rahman as SI Basheer
- Santha Devi
- Aravind Akash as Dance master
- Ambika Mohan as Radhika
- Vijayan Peringode as Nambiar

== Soundtrack ==
The film's soundtrack contains five songs, all composed by Thej Mervin, with lyrics by Gireesh Puthenchery.

#	Title	Singer(s)
1	"Kuthira"	M. G. Sreekumar
2	"Madhuram"	K. S. Chitra
3	"Oru Penkidaavu"	Jassie Gift
4	"Oru Penkidaavu (D)"	Sayanora Philip, Jassie Gift, Sujatha Mohan, Chorus
5	"Prajaapathy"	M. G. Sreekumar

== Reception ==
Rediff.com rated 1.5 out of 5 stars and wrote that "this film is a repeat of his older films; you see bits and pieces of almost all his successful films as a writer first and director later".
