= Bhoomi (2017 film) =

2017 Directed by Omung Kumar

- Theatrical release poster
- Directed by: Omung Kumar
- Written by: Screenplay: Raaj Shaandilyaa; Dialogues: Raaj Shaandilyaa
- Produced by: Bhushan Kumar; Sandip Ssingh; Krishan Kumar
- Starring: Sanjay Dutt; Aditi Rao Hydari; Shekhar Suman; Sidhant Gupta; Sharad Kelkar
- Cinematography: Artur Zurawski
- Edited by: Jayesh Shikarkhane
- Music by: Songs: Sachin–Jigar; Sachet–Parampara; Background Score: Ismail Darbar
- Production companies: T-Series; Legend Studios
- Distributed by: AA Films; Cinekorn Entertainment; Anand Motion Pictures; Walt Disney Studios Motion Pictures
- Release date: 22 September 2017
- Running time: 136 minutes
- Country: India
- Language: Hindi
- Box office: ₹14.76 crores

Bhoomi (transl. Earth) is a 2017 Indian Hindi-language action drama film directed and co-produced by Omung Kumar. A remake of 2008 Bengali film Shibaji, the film stars Sanjay Dutt, Aditi Rao Hydari, and Sharad Kelkar. Principal photography commenced in February 2017 in Agra. The film was released worldwide on 22 September 2017.

== Plot ==
Bhoomi Sachdeva, a designer, is all set to be married to Neeraj Mathur, her best friend, but has a problem of returning home late from work. Her father, Arun Sachdeva is an alcoholic shoe-maker who sells shoes, and the two share a loving relationship. Vishal Munshi, the son of a neighbourhood shopkeeper, is infatuated with Bhoomi and not happy about her upcoming wedding. He stalks her, and she slaps him one day when he tries to forcefully assert his love. Vishal meets his cousin Dedha's gangster boss Dhauli, who convinces him to do something about it.

One day, while travelling home with her aide Jeetu, Bhoomi is kidnapped. Vishal asphyxiates her to near death, and Vishal, Dedha, and Dhauli take turns gang-raping her. Bhoomi eventually falls unconscious. On the day of the wedding, Neeraj is shocked to learn of her assault, and is forced against his will to cancel the marriage. Following this, her father Arun and his childhood friend, Tripurari "Taj" Mishra, visit a police station to register a complaint. The police officer goes with him to his house, where they find Bhoomi missing. Bhoomi is kidnapped again by Vishal, Dhauli and Dedha. They try to rape her again but she flees and after chasing her, Dhauli throws her into a river to die.

Dhauli soon discovers that Bhoomi survived; in the ensuing court case, Arun accuses the defense lawyer of being patriarchal and body-shaming Bhoomi. The case is dismissed after they let go of Dhauli. The incident brings father and daughter closer to each other. Bhoomi is further shamed in society when people write her phone number on the walls. Neeraj returns, overcome by remorse, but cannot pacify her, as she leaves him. The next day, Jeetu's family visits and shows Bhoomi a video from Jeetu's phone detailing the rape. Realising Jeetu was complicit in the act, Bhoomi is shocked.

Arun and Bhoomi turn ruthless and abduct Jeetu, whom they then torture. Arun goes on a scaring spree by haunting Vishal. Dhauli takes a petrified Vishal to Arun, asking Vishal to apologise, but Arun picks a fight with Dhauli. On his 18th birthday, Jeetu is forced to slit his throat by Arun, and his body is found in Bhagwan Talkies, where they had raped Bhoomi. The police officer who had registered Arun's complaint is surprised to see Jeetu's sister disclaiming responsibility and cursing herself for having been his sister. The officer returns Arun his keychain that he'd been holding at the police station, and says that one mustn't leave his belongings after playing a game, implying that the policeman knows Arun is the murderer. Dedha threatens Bhoomi again; Taj intervenes but falls onto an iron rod and dies from his injuries. Shattered by the loss of his friend, Arun decides to finish off Vishal, Dedha and Dhauli.

After a long scuffle, Dedha dies from his injuries while being held in the path of a speeding train. Vishal, scared by Jeetu and Dedha's murders, boards a bus, but Arun and Bhoomi confront him and force him to castrate himself. Arun drives the bus to Dhauli's area. Arun and Bhoomi chase Dhauli to a temple, where they throw him into a pond. He then dies as Bhoomi and Arun look on, having succeeded in their mission.

== Cast ==
- Sanjay Dutt as Arun Sachdeva a.k.a. Baba
- Aditi Rao Hydari as Bhoomi Sachdeva, daughter of Arun
- Riddhi Sen as Jeetu
- Sharad Kelkar as Dhauli
- Sidhant Gupta as Neeraj Mathur
- Puru Chibber as Vishal Munshi
- Sakshi Dwivedi as Diya
- Shekhar Suman as Tripurari "Taj" Mishra, Arun's childhood friend
- Sunny Leone in the item number "Trippy Trippy"

== Reception ==
Sukanya Verma, writing for Rediff.com, termed it "one of the worst films of the year" and blamed it for "[taking] perverse pleasure in a woman's humiliation". She opined that Dutt's character's transformation lacked seriousness and found the film to be "ghastly". India Today's critic Lakshana N Palat gave the film a 1/5 rating. Meena Iyer writing for Times of India wrote "Watch Bhoomi for Dutt. He's from that era of larger-than-life heroes who get you to applaud even when he turns into a killing machine. You may not approve of his bloodlust, but you can't fault his swagger."

== Soundtrack ==
Bhoomi

Soundtrack album by Sachin–Jigar
- Released: 28 August 2017
- Genre: Feature film soundtrack
- Length: 32:23
- Language: Hindi
- Label: T-Series

Sachin–Jigar chronology
A Gentleman (2017)	Bhoomi (2017)	Simran (2017)
External audio
- Official Audio Jukebox on YouTube

The music of the film has been composed by Sachin–Jigar except where noted. In contrast, the lyrics have been penned by Priya Saraiya, Vayu, Anvita Dutt Guptan, Badshah and Utkarsh Naithani and the score is composed by Ismail Darbar. The first song of the film, "Trippy Trippy", which is sung by Neha Kakkar, Benny Dayal, Brijesh Shandilya and Badshah, was released on 18 August 2017. The second song, "Lag Ja Gale", which is sung by Rahat Fateh Ali Khan was released on 23 August 2017. The soundtrack was released by T-Series on 28 August 2017 and includes 8 songs.

All music is composed by Sachin–Jigar.

Track listing
No.	Title	Lyrics	Singer(s)	Length
1.	"Trippy Trippy"	Priya Saraiya, Rap lyrics by Badshah	Neha Kakkar, Benny Dayal, Brijesh Shandilya, Badshah	3:34
2.	"Lag Ja Gale"	Priya Saraiya	Rahat Fateh Ali Khan	3:46
3.	"Kho Diya"	Priya Saraiya	Sachin Sanghvi	4:01
4.	"Will You Marry Me"	Anvita Dutt	Divya Kumar, Jonita Gandhi	3:54
5.	"Daag"	Priya Saraiya	Sukhwinder Singh	4:18
6.	"Jai Mata Di"	Vayu, Utkarsh Naithani	Sanjay Dutt, Ajay Gogavale	4:08
7.	"Mere Baad" (Music by: Sachet–Parampara)	Sachet–Parampara	Payal Dev	4:33
8.	"Lag Ja Gale" (Duet)	Priya Saraiya	Rahat Fateh Ali Khan, Shruti Pathak	4:09
Total length:				32:23
