= First Look =

First Look could refer to:

- 1st Look, a weekly late-night NBC series about urban culture and food
- First Look Media, a news organization
- First-look deal, a deal with a production company to get a first look at a project
- Morning Joe First Look, a news program on MSNBC; formerly solely titled First Look
- First Look Film Festival (MoMI), annual festival by the Museum of the Moving Image
- First Look Film Festival, former annual festival in Denver
- First Look Studios, an American independent film and home video distributor
