= Ed Romanoff =

- Origin: Manhattan, New York
- Occupations: Singer-songwriter entrepreneur
- Website: http://edromanoff.com/

Ed Romanoff is an American singer-songwriter, corporate story-teller and entrepreneur. His first album, Ed Romanoff, was a Roots Radio Top 100 Album for 2012. He is also the founder of PineRock, a global brand communications company based in New York City. He has co-written numerous soft-rock songs and toured with artists such as Rachael Yamagata.

== Early life ==
Romanoff was raised in Connecticut and played sports at PineRock Park, the inspiration for the name of the company he founded in 1996. He was 17 years old when he purchased his first guitar and began playing the music of John Prine, whom he credits as an inspiration for him becoming a musician.

Romanoff graduated from the University of Virginia where he earned a Bachelor's degree in Communications. He dabbled in various professions before going into communications, including carpentry, special education teaching, and cattle branding. Between 1988 and 1992 he worked as an account manager, director of sales, and assistant to the general manager at Jack Morton Co. He then moved on to become the general manager of Ray Block Productions, Inc. where he stayed until 1996. That year, Romanoff founded PineRock, a global brand communications company that specializes in events, digital and video production as well as communication strategy for corporations internationally.

== Music career ==
Romanoff began writing music in 2008. He studied at The Song School in Lyons, Colorado, where he studied with artists Darrell Scott and Beth Nielsen Chapman.

He released his first album, self-titled, in June 2012 at the age of 53. The album contains ten original songs (11 total), with guest vocals by Josh Ritter, Tift Merritt and Mary Gauthier, and guest accompaniment by Duke Levine, Jaroslav Rodriguez, Tom West, Kimon Kirk, and Eugene Friesen on different tracks. The album peaked at number 12 on the European Americana Charts and was a Roots Radio Top 100 Album for 2012. Romanoff also announced that he was working on a second album.

In 2015 Ed Romanoff was two times on tour in Europe opening for Rachael Yamagata. In February 2015 the tour led him to Munich, Frankfurt, Leipzig, Cologne, Stuttgart, Duisburg, Hamburg, and Berlin. In September 2015 he opened for Rachael Yamagata in London, Hamburg, Verona, Ravenna, Zürich, Frankfurt, Amsterdam and Rotterdam; in October 2015 he joined also in Barcelona.

On December 2, 2016, Ed Romanoff released digitally a Christmas song called "Everyday Is Christmas (Since I Met You)" on the German record label "Birdstone Records". The tune was produced by Nic v. Vogelstein.

"On February 23, 2018, Ed Romanoff's second album "The Orphan King" was released in the US and Europe; produced by Simone Felice (The Lumineers, Levon Helm Band, Bat For Lashes). The album entered in February 2018 No. 2 on the Euro Americana Charts and repeated this feat in March 2018. The German edition of the Rolling Stone magazine rated the album with 4 stars (out of 5) concluding the review by saying "Ed Romanoffs second album earns every attention, even more than his first one". The German vinyl magazine MINT wrote in their review: "There are not many records that musically put a bracket on a whole genre and are suitable for a blueprint to a musical passion formulated to perfection – Springsteen's "Nebraska" would be one, or "Songs Of Love And Hate" by Leonard Cohen. Of course, mentioning these two is no coincidence, because The Orphan King shares much inspiration with these milestones."

The extensive list of guest musicians on "The Orphan King" contains: Larry Campbell (Bob Dylan, Emmylou Harris, Paul Simon, Elvis Costello, etc.), Cindy Cashdollar (Bob Dylan, Ryan Adams, Van Morrison), David Baron (Lenny Kravitz, Lumineers, Meghan Trainor), Teresa Williams (Jackson Browne, Little Feat, Rodney Crowell, etc.), Cindy Mizelle (Bruce Springsteen, Rolling Stones, Whitney Houston, etc.), Mai Bloomfield (Jason Mraz, Adam Cohen, Sara Bareilles), Kenneth Pattengale (Milk Carton Kids), among others.

== Awards and recognition ==
Romanoff won first place at the 2011 International Songwriting Competition for the lyrics to his single "St. Vincent de Paul". The song was inspired by his search for his biological father. He also received top honors for his songs "Two Yellow Roses" and "Breakfast for One on the Fifth of July" in the Great American Song Contest. Romanoff was also the winner of the 2013 New Folk competition at the Kerrville Folk Festival, an award previously won by singer-songwriters like Steve Earle and Lyle Lovett.

== Personal life ==
Romanoff grew up believing he was of Russian descent. In 2008, he accompanied a friend taking a DNA test and took the test too as an act of solidarity and to learn more about his heritage. The results revealed that he was actually of half Irish descent. The man he believed to be his father was, in fact, not his biological father. The opening song of his Ed Romanoff album, "St. Vincent de Paul", discusses his search to find his real father.

=== Album ===
- Ed Romanoff (2012)
- The Orphan King (2018, PineRock Records)

=== Singles (digital only) ===
- Everyday Is Christmas (Since I Met You) (2016, Birdstone Records)

=== Compilation appearances ===
- I. C. Independent Celebration, Vol. 1 (2015, Birdstone Records) (song: "Two Yellow Roses")
