= Aditi Rao Hydari =

Indian actress

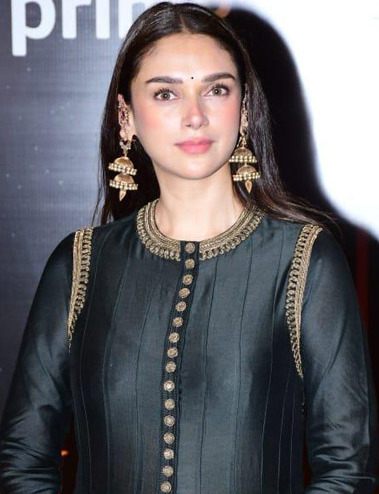
- Rao Hydari in 2023
- Born: 28 October 1978 (age 48); Hyderabad, Andhra Pradesh, India
- Occupation: Actress
- Years active: 2006–present
- Spouses: Satyadeep Mishra (divorced); Siddharth (m. 2024)
- Mother: Vidya Rao
- Relatives: Kiran Rao (cousin)
- Family: Tyabji–Hydari family

Aditi Rao Hydari (Hindi: [ədɪtɪ ɾɑːʋ ɦɛːdɾiː]; born 28 October 1987) is an Indian actress who works primarily in Hindi, Tamil and Telugu films. Born into the Tyabji–Hydari family, she made her film debut with the Malayalam film Prajapathi (2006). She received attention for her roles in Delhi 6 (2009) and Yeh Saali Zindagi (2011), for which she won her first Screen Award. She subsequently appeared in the musical Rockstar (2011), the horror film Murder 3 (2013), the thriller Wazir (2016), as well as the period drama Padmaavat (2018), which was commercially successful and earned her an IIFA Award.

Hydari starred in Mani Ratnam's romantic drama Kaatru Veliyidai (2017), for which she won a SIIMA Award. She received a nomination for the Filmfare Award for Best Actress – Telugu for Sammohanam (2018). She has since starred in several Tamil, Telugu and Malayalam films, such as Chekka Chivantha Vaanam (2018), Sufiyum Sujatayum (2020) and Maha Samudram (2021), as well as the Hindi anthology film Ajeeb Daastaans (2021) and series Jubilee (2023) and Heeramandi (2024).

== Early life and background ==
Aditi Rao Hydari was born in Hyderabad to engineer Ahsan Hydari and singer Vidya Rao.

Both of Hydari's parents belong to the nobility of erstwhile Hyderabad state. Aditi's father was the grandson of Akbar Hydari, former Prime Minister of Hyderabad state, and the nephew of Muhammad Saleh Akbar Hydari, former Governor of Assam. Aditi's mother, Vidya Rao, is a classical singer accomplished in the thumri and dadra genres of Hindustani music. Her mother (Aditi's maternal grandmother), Shanta Rameshwar Rao, was the founder of Vidyaranya High School in Hyderabad and chairperson of the publishing house Orient Blackswan, established by her father Raja J Rameshwar Rao. Vidya is the step-daughter of J. Rameshwar Rao, last ruling Raja of Wanaparthy. He was one of the four highest-ranking nobleman in the court of the Nizam of Hyderabad. His ancestral Jagir, Wanaparthy, was one of the four largest feudal estates under Hyderabad state; the holders of these estates held the title of "Maharaja". Indian film producer, screenwriter, and director Kiran Rao, ex-wife of actor Aamir Khan, is Aditi's maternal first cousin.

Her parents separated when she was two years old, and she grew up between Hyderabad and Delhi with her mother. She studied at the Rishi Valley School, run by the Krishnamurti Foundation. Aditi later graduated from Lady Shri Ram College, University of Delhi.

Hydari grew up around a lot of classical arts, started learning Bharatanatyam at age five, and became a student of acclaimed dancer Leela Samson. She uses both of her parents' surnames and that's what makes her name unique.

== Career ==
=== Early roles (2004–2009) ===
Hydari began her career as a Bharatanatyam dancer, having become interested in the art form following her association with Leela Samson from the age of 11. She worked as a part of Samson's dance group, Spanda, teaching students and travelling through India and abroad to perform in stage events. In early 2004, Hydari completed work on her first acting project titled Sringaram, where she portrayed the lead role of a devadasi, a temple dancer of the 19th century. The Tamil film was directed by Sharada Ramanathan and produced by Padmini Ravi, a noted Bharatanatyam dancer. Hydari was offered the role after Ramanathan saw her dance performance at a conference, and was also impressed with her "vulnerable and fresh face" and her resemblance to dancer Shobana. After being screened at numerous international film festivals throughout 2005 and 2006, the film received critical acclaim upon being shown in India and fetched several accolades, including three National Film Awards. Sringaram had a limited theatrical release in October 2007, but won positive reviews, with one critic noting that "the film has brilliant acting from the lead, Aditi Rao".

Her first film to have a theatrical release, however, was the Malayalam film Prajapathi (2006), in which she starred alongside Mammootty. She had been recommended to director Ranjith for the role by actress Suhasini, and was selected after the director managed to get in contact with her through Madhu Ambat, who was the cinematographer of Sringaram. Hydari portrayed an orphan girl who falls in love with the character played by Mammootty, but her role was considered minimal, with a critic from Rediff stating she "has nothing to do with the overall plot". In 2009, she was cast by Rakeysh Omprakash Mehra in his Hindi drama film, Delhi-6, where she portrayed a supporting role of an unmarried woman living in a community where spinsterhood was frowned upon. Featuring in an ensemble cast alongside Abhishek Bachchan and Sonam Kapoor, Hydari was selected by Mehra after he was impressed with her performance in Sringaram.

=== Career expansion (2009–2015) ===
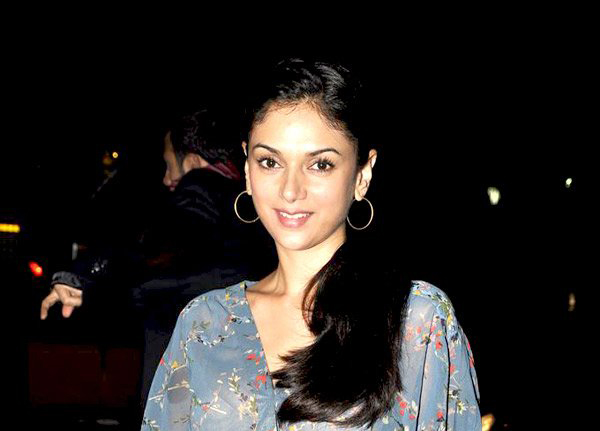
Hydari in 2011

In 2011, Hydari appeared in a role opposite Arunoday Singh in Sudhir Mishra's romantic drama Yeh Saali Zindagi. Portraying the wife of a former convict, the film garnered publicity prior to release for the sensuous scenes between Hydari and Singh. Post-release, Hydari received acclaim for her performance by winning the Screen Award for Best Supporting Actress and subsequently received much larger public attention. She later portrayed a supporting role alongside Ranbir Kapoor in Imtiaz Ali's musical drama Rockstar (2011). Hydari initially had met Ali to discuss the leading female role of a Kashmiri girl, but he chose to cast newcomer Nargis Fakhri instead. Ali subsequently contacted her again after two months and signed her to play a supporting role of an impulsive television reporter, who follows the character played by Kapoor. Several of Hydari's scenes in the film were trimmed before its theatrical release, much like her appearance in Delhi-6, and a critic noted her role "suffers due to an undeveloped characterization".

Hydari made a public statement that she wanted to appear in lead roles, rather than portray secondary characters, and subsequently, she was cast in her first lead role in a Hindi film through London, Paris, New York (2012) opposite Ali Zafar. Directed by Anu Menon, the film narrated the tale of a couple who connect with each other in unlikely circumstances in three different cities – London, Paris and New York City. With the film, she made her singing debut by singing two of the songs from the soundtrack. Hydari won predominantly positive reviews for her role of Lalitha, with a reviewer from Sify.com stating Hydari "makes the transition from side actress to leading lady and is instantly impressive", adding she is a "good performer with a striking screen presence" and that "she's likely to go places". Likewise, reviewers from The Hindu and NDTV called her performance "beautiful and in control of her character" and "a delight to watch", respectively. During the period, she also sung the Hindi version of the song "We Are Family" for the Hollywood animation film Ice Age 4: Continental Drift.

In 2013, she became a part of Mahesh Bhatt's Murder franchise, when she was cast as Roshni, opposite Randeep Hooda, in Vishesh Bhatt's directorial film Murder 3. Hydari stated she was keen to do a film which would show the "mysterious and sensual side" to her, away from the several "innocent" roles she had done prior to Murder 3. She received positive reviews for her performance, Taran Adarsh of Bollywood Hungama wrote "Aditi and Sara are show-stoppers" and that "both deliver knockout performances". Hydari then starred alongside Akshay Kumar and Shiv Panditt in the action film Boss (2013) directed by Anthony D'Souza. Describing her role as one of a "quintessential Hindi movie heroine", she revealed that she signed the film owing to Akshay Kumar's popularity and that it was important to be a part of a film which would have a "wide reach". The film received mixed reviews from critics but was a box office success. In 2014, Hydari appeared in two guest roles – as a royal princess in the comedy drama Khoobsurat and then as a dancer in the Marathi period drama Rama Madhav, at the request of choreographer Saroj Khan. She was next seen in the comedy drama, Guddu Rangeela (2015) by Subhash Kapoor, which had an average performance at the box office. For her performance, a reviewer from Rediff wrote Hydari "is perfectly cast as a bright-eyed girl who knows more than she lets on, and the actress looks luminous".

=== Breakthrough and commercial success (2016–2022) ===
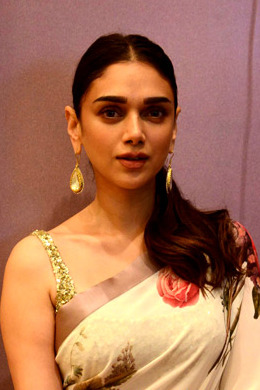
Hydari grace Vogue Fashion Weekend

In 2016, Hydari starred alongside Amitabh Bachchan and Farhan Akhtar in Bejoy Nambiar's crime thriller film Wazir. The film tells the story of two unusual friends, a chess grandmaster who uses a wheelchair, played by Bachchan, and a grief-stricken ATS officer, played by Akhtar. Hydari played the love interest of Akhtar's character. The film released on 8 January 2016 to mostly positive reviews and had the box office collection of around ₹620 million (US$6.6 million). Hydari also garnered praise for her performance. Gayatri Gauri in her review for Firstpost called Hydari's performance a "welcome change from glamorous heroines we usually see on screen." Abhijit Bhaduri of The Times of India said that despite the lack of focus on her character, she did justice to her part by "conveying stuff with her eyes." Ananya Bhattacharya of India Today gave Hydari the highest praise saying that she "brings vulnerability to her Ruhana" added that she "has to her credit several strong sequences."

Hydari next starred in Abhishek Kapoor's romantic drama Fitoor, along with Tabu, Katrina Kaif and Aditya Roy Kapur. The film based on Charles Dickens' novel Great Expectations, had Hydari play the role of the younger Miss Havisham (Tabu replaced Rekha). The film was released on 12 February 2016 to mixed-to-positive reviews and underperformed at the box-office. However, Hydari garnered widespread praise for her performance. Sarita Tanwar of Daily News and Analysis in her review wrote: "Aditi Rao Hydari does full justice to the part of young Begum". Her third film of 2016, The Legend of Michael Mishra had a poor response from critics, with the critic from The Times of India noting "Aditi Rao Hydari's good looks is the only good thing about this amateurish attempt, masquerading as a feature film, aimed for adults."

Hydari's first project of 2017, Kaatru Veliyidai, marked her first collaboration with director Mani Ratnam and second film in Tamil Cinema. She played the role of Leela Abraham, a doctor based in Kargil during the 1999 war, who has a tumultuous and abusive relationship with a fighter pilot, played by Karthi. Upon release, Kaatru Veliyidai garnered mixed reviews; though critics predominantly praised the performance of Hydari along with A. R. Rahman's music and Ravi Varman's cinematography. Malini Mannath of The New Indian Express opined: "Hydari's exotic looks and vulnerable demeanour is a perfect foil to Karthi's mercurial ways. The actress has been flatteringly photographed." She next appeared as the titular lead in Omung Kumar's Bhoomi, with Sanjay Dutt, where she played a rape survivor.

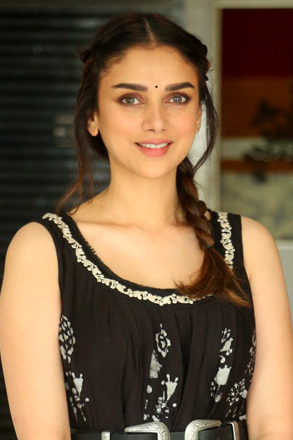
Hydari at an event for her film Sammohanam

In her first release of 2018, Hydari played the role of Alauddin Khalji's first wife, Queen Mehrunisa, opposite Ranveer Singh in the epic film Padmaavat directed by Sanjay Leela Bhansali. The film released on 25 January 2018 amidst numerous controversies and protests. Padmaavat received mixed-to-positive reviews from critics but was a box office success. Anna M. M. Vetticad noted, "Deepika Padukone and Aditi Rao Hydari look great. They are the only ones among the lead cast who manage to eke something out of the stereotype-ridden writing." Hydari next starred in Sudhir Mishra's political thriller film Daas Dev, which was an adaptation of Sarat Chandra Chattopadhyay's 1917 novel Devdas. She essayed the part of Chandramukhi opposite Rahul Bhat. The year also marked her second film with Mani Ratnam and third Tamil film, with Chekka Chivantha Vaanam. She played Parvathi, and was paired alongside Arvind Swamy. The film had a worldwide release on 27 September 2018 and was a major commercial success. Hydari then made her debut in Telugu cinema with Sammohanam, playing an actress opposite Sudheer Babu. Srivathsan Nadadhur for The Hindu stated that her part will "stay with you". Her final film that year was the Telugu space thriller film Antariksham 9000 KMPH.

Post a year break, Hydari had three releases in 2020. She first played a RJ opposite Udhayanidhi Stalin in Psycho. With her next film Sufiyum Sujatayum, she returned to Malayalam films playing a mute girl alongside Dev Mohan. Nitya Punnackal of Manorama Online said, "While Aditi plays adult Sujatha beautifully, she fails to bring freshness in her younger version." In her final film that year, Hydari played Nani's wife Saheba in V. Janaki K. of India Today noted, "With limited screen time, Aditi's character arc makes the story more interesting towards the climax."

In 2021, Hydari appeared in the suspense film The Girl On The Train, directed by Ribhu Dasgupta. The film starring Parineeti Chopra, Kirti Kulhari, Avinash Tiwary, and Sammy Jonas Heaney alongside her, is based on British author Paula Hawkins 2015 novel of the same name. Her next film the same year, was the Netflix film Ajeeb Daastaans, for which she received positive reviews. She next played a cameo role of Young Sardar Kaur in Sardar Ka Grandson. Her final film of the year was Telugu film Maha Samudram, opposite Siddharth and Sharwanand. In 2022, she played Mouna, in the Tamil film Hey Sinamika opposite Dulquer Salmaan, which received mixed reviews. Haricharan Pudipeddi stated that she delivers a "mature performance".

=== Further expansion and streaming projects (2023–present) ===
Hydari expanded to web with her first release of 2023, Taj: Divided by Blood, where she played Anarkali. Suchandra Bose for The Quint criticised the character's importance and added, "Aditi doesn't have much to do other than look gorgeous and gaze longingly at her prince." That year, she played an actress in Vikramaditya Motwane's web series, Jubilee. Shubhra Gupta noted that though Rao Hydari is over-utilizing her deer-caught-in-headlights stare, she is a "perfect fit" for the steely-softness of Sumitra.

In 2024, Hydari played a courtesan Bibbojaan in Sanjay Leela Bhansali's Heeramandi. Nandini Ramnath of Scroll.in added, "Rao Hydari is well-placed to do the heavy lifting required of her soft-hearted but secretly tough character." While, Sukanya Verma was appreciative of her beauty and looks. Hydari will next appear alongside Vijay Sethupathi and Arvind Swamy in the silent film, Gandhi Talks. She is also set to appear in the upcoming film Lioness alongside Paige Sandhu.

== Personal life ==
In 2004, it was reported that Hydari was married to Satyadeep Mishra in 2002, an Indian actor and former lawyer. The actress had declined to comment on her marital status in a 2012 interview, but in a 2013 interview, she mentioned that she and Mishra were separated. Hydari had met Mishra when she was 17 years old, and it was with him that she had her first serious relationship. Although separated, the two have kept in touch over the years and remain close friends.

Aditi met actor Siddharth on the set of their film Maha Samudram in 2021, and the two began dating later that year. On 28 March 2024, they announced their engagement, and on 16 September 2024, they were married.

== In the media ==
Rao Hydari in 2025

Her performance in the Tamil film, Kaatru Veliyidai, is regarded as one of the "100 Greatest Performances of the Decade" by Film Companion. Hydari has frequently featured in Times' 50 Most Desirable Woman list. She ranked 6th in 2018, 9th in 2019 and 16th in 2020. She was named the Hyderabad Times Most Desirable Woman of 2018. In the same list, she was placed 4th in 2019 and 6th in 2020. She was also named the Chennai Times Most Desirable Woman of 2019 and was placed 5th in 2020, in the list. She is a celebrity endorser for brands including L'Oreal Paris, Airtel, Cadbury, Maaza and Avon.

== Filmography ==
=== Films ===
Key
†	Denotes films that have not yet been released

Year	Title	Role	Language	Notes	Ref.
2006	Prajapathi	Savithri	Malayalam		
2007	Sringaram	Madhura/Varshini	Tamil	Dual role	
2009	Delhi 6	Rama	Hindi		
2010	Dhobi Ghat	Guest at art gallery	Hindi		
2011	Yeh Saali Zindagi	Shanti	Hindi		
2011	Rockstar	Sheena	Hindi		
2012	London, Paris, New York	Lalitha Krishnan	Hindi		
2013	Murder 3	Roshni	Hindi		
2013	Boss	Ankita Thakur	Hindi		
2014	Khoobsurat	Kiara	Hindi	Special appearance	
2014	Rama Madhav	Herself	Marathi	Special appearance in song "Loot Liyo Mohe Shyam"	
2015	Guddu Rangeela	Baby	Hindi		
2016	Wazir	Ruhana Ali	Hindi		
2016	Fitoor	Young Begum Hazrat	Hindi	Special appearance	
2016	The Legend of Michael Mishra	Varshali Shukla	Hindi		
2017	Kaatru Veliyidai	Leela Abraham	Tamil		
2017	Bhoomi	Bhoomi Sachdeva	Hindi		
2018	Padmaavat	Mehrunisa	Hindi		
2018	Daas Dev	Chandni	Hindi		
2018	Sammohanam	Sameera	Telugu		
2018	Chekka Chivantha Vaanam	Parvathi	Tamil		
2018	Antariksham 9000 KMPH	Riya	Telugu		
2020	Psycho	Dagini	Tamil		
2020	Sufiyum Sujatayum	Sujatha	Malayalam		
2020	V	Saheba	Telugu		
2021	The Girl on the Train	Nusrat John	Hindi		
2021	Ajeeb Daastaans	Priya Sharma	Hindi		
2021	Sardar Ka Grandson	Young Swanmeet "Sardar" Kaur	Hindi	Special appearance	
2021	Maha Samudram	Mahalakshmi	Telugu		
2022	Hey Sinamika	Mouna Yaazhan	Tamil		
2023	Gandhi Talks	Gayathri	Silent	Premiered at the IFFI	
2026	Lust Stories 3	Saira	Hindi	Segment: "Erotica"	
2026	Parivarik ManuRanjan	Manu Joshi/"Helen"	Hindi		
TBA	Lioness †	Mehak	English	Filming	

=== Television ===
Year	Title	Role	Notes	Ref.
2023	Taj: Divided by Blood	Anarkali		
2023	Jubilee	Sumitra Kumari		
2024-present	Heeramandi	Bibbojaan		
TBA	O Saathi Re †	TBA	Completed	

=== As voice actor ===
Year	Movie	Dubbing for	Language	Notes	Ref.
2022	Ponniyin Selvan: I	Trisha	Hindi	Dubbed for the character Kundavai	
2023	Ponniyin Selvan: II	Trisha	Hindi	Dubbed for the character Kundavai	

== Discography ==
Year	Album	Song	Music Director	Language	Ref.
2021	Jail	"Kaathodu Kaathanen" (co-singer Dhanush)	G. V. Prakash Kumar	Tamil	
2024	Coke Studio Tamil	"Please Purinjukko" (co-singer Sean Roldan)	Sean Roldan	Tamil	

== Accolades ==
Year	Film	Award	Category	Result	Ref.
2010	Delhi-6	Screen Awards	Best Ensemble Cast	Nominated	
2013	Yeh Saali Zindagi	Screen Awards	Best Supporting Actress	Won	
2013	Yeh Saali Zindagi	Zee Cine Awards	Best Actor in a Supporting Role – Female	Nominated	
2013	Yeh Saali Zindagi	Stardust Awards	Best Actress	Nominated	
2013	London, Paris, New York	Stardust Awards	Best Actress	Nominated	
2013	Rockstar	Producers Guild Film Awards	Best Actress in a Supporting Role	Nominated	
2014	Murder 3	BIG Star Entertainment Awards	Most Entertaining Actor in a Thriller Film – Female	Nominated	
2018	Kaatru Veliyidai	Asiavision Awards	Best Actress – Tamil	Won	
2018	Kaatru Veliyidai	Edison Awards	Face of the Year	Won	
2018	Kaatru Veliyidai	South Indian International Movie Awards	Best Female Debut – Tamil	Won	
2019	Sammohanam	Zee Cine Awards Telugu	Best Debut Actor – Female	Won	
2019	Sammohanam	Filmfare Awards South	Best Actress – Telugu	Nominated	
2019	Sammohanam	South Indian International Movie Awards	Best Actress – Telugu	Nominated	
2019	Padmaavat	International Indian Film Academy Awards	Best Supporting Actress	Won	
2023	Jubilee	Indian Television Academy Awards	Best Actress – Popular (OTT)	Won	

=== Other recognitions ===
Year	Award	Category	Result	Ref.
2023	Distinctive International Arab Festivals Awards	Outstanding Contributions to the Entertainment Industry	Won	
2024	Bollywood Hungama Style Icons	Most Stylish Classic Beauty of the Year	Won	
