= Dok Leipzig =

Annual film festival in Leipzig, Germany

Coordinates: 51°20′24″N 12°22′30″E

- Location: Leipzig, Germany
- Established: 1955

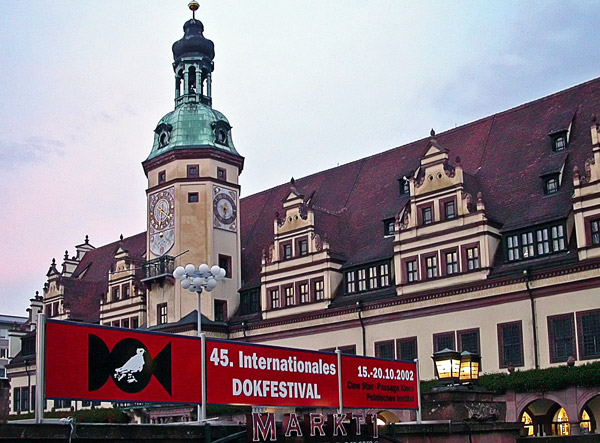
DOK Leipzig in 2002.

DOK Leipzig is a documentary film festival that takes place every October in Leipzig, Germany. It is an international film festival for documentary and animated film founded in 1955 under the name "1st All-German Leipzig Festival of Cultural and Documentary Films" and was the first independent film festival in East Germany. In 1995 a separate competition for animated films was added and in 2004 a film industry program, DOK Industry, was initiated to allow a networking and contact platform for industry professionals. Shortly after German reunification attendance figures dropped, with just 5,500 people coming in 1993; however, they quickly picked up and in 2008 the festival had more than 27,000 attendees. DOK Leipzig is part of the Doc Alliance – a creative partnership between 7 key European documentary film festivals.

== History ==
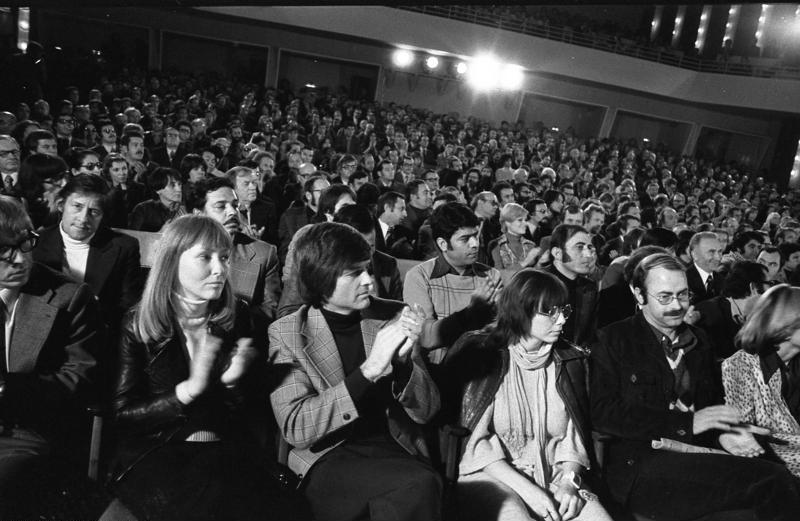
DOK Leipzig in 1976.

The initiative for the 1st All-German Leipzig Festival of Cultural and Documentary Films came from West German journalist and film critic Ludwig Thomés who, in the course of a discussion with the East German filmmakers club, Club der Filmschaffenden der DDR, proposed establishing a festival in Leipzig both as a counterpart to the Mannheim Culture and Documentary Filmweek (now known as International Filmfestival Mannheim-Heidelberg) and as a platform for productions from East Germany. After receiving permission from the responsible authorities, the inaugural festival was held from 11 to 17 September 1955 with Walter Kernicke as director.

However, no sooner had the festival started than it was stopped. Following harsh media criticism of the political influence over and the organization of the 1956 festival the organizers attempted to force changes. The response of the Government was to cancel the 1957, 1958 and 1959 festivals. The official reasons given were: the deteriorating situation in West German film making (1957), the loss of the original function of the festival as a German cultural and documentary film week, (1958) and plans to establish a cultural and documentary film week of the socialist states (1958).

In 1960 the festival returned under the name International Leipzig Documentary and Short Film Week and in 1962 the Gold and Silver Doves were introduced as prizes and the white dove appeared for the first time as the festival logo. The dove had been designed by Pablo Picasso for the Paris World Peace Congress of 1947 and the organization committee asked French author Vladimir Pozner if he could seek his friend's permission to use the dove for the festival. Picasso readily agreed.

In 1964 Wolfgang Harkenthal replaced Walter Kernicke as director and his first festivals took place against the backdrop of international conflicts and increasing politicization of the festival. In 1965 the 20th Anniversary of the end of the Second World War was marked by a retrospective titled "Films against fascism". In addition, Peter Ulbrich, Stanley Forman and Joris Ivens appealed to all documentary film makers to give their support to Vietnam and to inform the civilian population of the behavior of the US Army. In the official festival bulletin they wrote "No responsible film maker may remain apathetic to the Vietnam question." The 1966 festival opened with a blood collection for the people of Vietnam. The tone changed somewhat in 1967 with ban being put on all Czech films documenting the developing "Prague Spring" movement.

In 1968 the festival was renamed the International Leipzig Documentary and Short Film Week for Cinema and Television and despite the name change the festival continued to be overshadowed by bans on films critical of official East German policy, especially regarding films on the situation in Czechoslovakia and Latin American; conflicts on censorship and freedom that were to remain a feature of the festival until 1989.

In 1973 Ronald Trisch took over the post of director and in 1974 Jane Fonda attended to promote the Vietnam film "Introduction to the Enemy".

From 1983 to 1995 the Findling Award was given for the best film.

Following the political changes in East Germany in 1989, the festival was assured of financial support from the transition authority and re-branded itself in 1990 the International Leipzig Film Week for Documentary and Animation Film under the directorship of Christiane Mückenberger.

The early 1990s were characterized by extremely low attendances and half empty cinemas. In 1992 a competition as run with the buyer of the 3000th season pass being awarded a return flight to London. However, over the course of the decade visitor numbers started to recover with some 16,000 attendees in 1997.

In 1994 Fred Gehler took over the mantle of festival director and oversaw the introduction of the separate animation competition in 1995. In 1998 the first golden dove for lifetime achievement was awarded to Santiago Álvarez and Fernando Birri. In 1998 the festival moved to its current home in the Passage Kino, Hainstrasse.

Following Fred Gehler's retirement after the 2003 festival, Claas Danielsen was appointed new festival director and introduced the DOK Industry program as a platform for industry professionals to meet and exchange ideas. In 2005 the short title DOK Leipzig was officially launched alongside the formal International Leipzig Festival for Documentary and Animated Film.

== Retrospectives ==
Between 1960 and 1989 the selection of the retrospectives occurred in cooperation with Staatliches Filmarchiv der DDR, the East German Film Archive. Since 1991 this function has been taken on by the Film Department of the German Federal Archives.

- 1960 Dziga Vertov
- 1961 Films of the world - for the peace of the world
- 1962 Alberto Cavalcanti
- 1963 Joris Ivens
- 1964 Robert Flaherty
- 1965 Films against fascism
- 1966 French documentary film
- 1967 50 years of Soviet documentary films
- 1968 Polish documentary film
- 1969 Documentary film and television journalism in the GDR
- 1970 Documentary film under Lenin
- 1971 Roman Karmen
- 1972 Films in the people's struggle for freedom: Latin America
- 1973 Films in class struggle – Traditions of the proletarian Filmmakers in Germany before 1933
- 1974 Cuban Documentary film
- 1975 Winners in Leipzig 1956–1974
- 1976 Japan documentary film
- 1977 New soviet Documentary film
- 1978 Anima 78 - Animated films from socialist countries
- 1979 Trials - Films by students of the University for Film and Television of the GDR
- 1980 Czech Documentary film
- 1981 American Social Documentary – USA-Documentary films 1930–1945
- 1982 Trailblazers
- 1983 Films in the people's struggle for freedom: Chile
- 1984 Reality and Film – proletarian and civic-progressive documentary films of the 1930s in Great Britain
- 1985 Anima for peace
- 1986 Spain 1939–1939
- 1987 Documentary film from middleasian soviet republics
- 1988 Documentary film in India
- 1989 Klaus Wildenhahn
- 1990 Karl Gass
- 1991 Trusting in everyday reality – Trends in documentary film making in Denmark
- 1992 To America
- 1993 Views of Leipzig
- 1994 Prize Reduction – Documentary film and the German Film prize
- 1995 Seen again – rediscovered
- 1996 The reality behind the images – films by Erwin Leiser
- 1997 Dialogue with a legend – award-winning films from the past 40 years
- 1998 Alles Trick – German animated films until 1945
- 1999 Children's films – Trying to draw the line
- 2000 Jürgen Böttcher
- 2001 Memory in images – 40 retrospectives from the documentary film archive
- 2002 Women-Film-Women
- 2003 Look/Look Back and Reality Caught Unawares
- 2004 Volker Koepp: People and landscapes – Films from Wittstock to Czernowitz
- 2005 Red films are easier spotted – The political documentary film in Germany 1980-2005
- 2006 enlightening – Classic Avant-garde and Experimental-films in Germany
- 2007 Tracing – FilmPositions from five decades
- 2008 Strange Home – Migration to and from Germany
- 2009 Joris Ivens
- 2010 Direction and Regiment – Germany and the military in documentary films from 1914 to 1989
- 2011 1961 Reviewed – when the World was Split in Two
- 2012 Utopias and Realities – the Red Dream Factory
- 2013 STORM! A Journey in Eight Mass Movements through the Short 20th Century
- 2014 The State Owned Eye – the Camera in DEFA Documentaries
- 2015 Moving Borders ... Europe since 1990
- 2016 Seven Sins and Other Confessions in Polish Documentary Film
- 2017 Commanders – Chairmen – General Secretaries. Communist Rule in the Visual Languages of Cinema
- 2018 68 – An Open Score
- 2019 FRGDR – Alternate Looks at 40 Years of Dual German Statehood
- 2021 The Jews of Others. Divided Germany, Distributed Guilt, Divided Images
- 2022 The Documentary Filmmakers of the GDR
- 2023 Film and Protest – Popular Uprisings in the Cold War
- 2024 Third Ways in the Divided World – Utopias and Subversions

== See also ==
- Animated documentary
