= Foundling Hospital, Cork =

Foundling Hospital
- Shown in Ireland

Geography
- Location: Cork, County Cork, Ireland
- Coordinates: 51°54′13″N 8°28′27″W

Organisation
- Type: Specialist

Services
- Speciality: Foundling Hospital

History
- Founded: 1747
- Closed: 1855

The Foundling Hospital (Irish: Ospidéal Foundling) was a hospital in Leitrim Street, Cork, Ireland.

== History ==
Following a 1735 Act of the Irish Parliament which provided for hospitals being funded by a local tax on coal and culm, (a type of coal known as Anthracite), weigh-house fines, carriage car licenses and penalties on drivers of same, it was decided to establish a foundling hospital in Leitrim Street. The properties constructed, at a site now occupied by the Lady's Well or Murphy's Brewery, were based around a small quadrangle with a chapel, school-rooms, boys dormitories, girls dormitories, and staff apartments. The hospital opened in 1747.

In 1821 the foundling hospital was governed by the Lord Bishop of Cork, the Mayor, Recorder, Aldermen, Sheriffs, and Common Council, Common Speaker, and 26 others annually chosen at the Court of D'Oyer Hundred. At this time the tax on coal was levied at one Shilling per ton of coal imported into Cork.

In Cork, the Union Workhouse was opened on Douglas Road in 1841. The Foundling Hospital at Leitrim Street subsequently closed in July 1855, when it was converted by the Emigration Commissioners for use as an Emigration depot.

== See also ==
- Foundling hospital
