= The Foundling (Leary novel) =

2022 historical novel

First edition (publ. Scribners)

The Foundling is a 2022 historical fiction novel by Ann Leary. It is about a home for women deemed "unfit to bear children", and is primarily concerned with eugenics in the United States.

== Synopsis ==
A young woman named Mary Engle accepts a position as a secretary at the Nettleton State Village for Feeble-minded Women of Child Bearing Age. While working there she encounters Lillian Faust, a young woman she recognizes from the orphanage she grew up in. Engle knows from her past history with Faust that she is not feeble-minded, and finds that many of the other women at the institution aren't either; many were institutionalized because they were sex workers, drank alcohol, or had interracial relationships. She resolves to help Faust leave the institution, even if it means that she may lose her position and the respect of Dr. Agnes Vogel, the owner of the institution, whom Engle deeply admires.

== Critical reception ==
Kirkus Reviews wrote that the novel centers on Engle's "moral coming-of-age" as she reassesses her faith in Vogel's claims to do what is best for the women in her care.

In her Los Angeles Times review Berry called the book "timely", pointing out that this book, which discusses the regulation of women's bodies and bodily autonomy, was published at a time when those rights have once again faced challenges with the overturning of Roe v. Wade. The Washington Post called the book a "beach read" with a serious topic, and also points out the parallels to the present day. Despite these parallels to the present day, the New York Times points out that Engle remains very much a woman of her day, and that Leary did not imbue her character with modern values, which makes her decisions at the end of the novel more striking.
