= Mercy Now =

Studio album by Mary Gauthier
- Released: February 15, 2005
- Studio: Rootball Studio, Austin, Texas
- Genre: Country, folk
- Length: 50:15
- Label: Lost Highway
- Producer: Gurf Morlix

Mary Gauthier chronology
Filth & Fire (2002)	Mercy Now (2005)	Between Daylight and Dark (2007)

Mercy Now is the fourth studio album by Mary Gauthier.

== Track listing ==
All tracks composed by Mary Gauthier; except where indicated

No.	Title	Writer(s)	Length
1.	"Falling Out of Love"		5:57
2.	"Mercy Now"		5:51
3.	"Wheel Inside the Wheel"		6:33
4.	"I Drink"	Gauthier, Crit Harmon	4:31
5.	"Just Say She's a Rhymer"	Harlan Howard	4:17
6.	"Prayer Without Words"	Gauthier, Tom Damphier	6:09
7.	"Your Sister Cried"	Fred Eaglesmith	5:00
8.	"Empty Spaces"	Gauthier, Dale Keys	3:43
9.	"Drop in a Bucket"		4:11
10.	"It Ain't the Wind, It's the Rain"		4:03
Total length:			50:15

== Personnel ==
- Mary Gauthier - vocals, acoustic guitar
- Gurf Morlix - acoustic and electric guitar, bass, lap steel, octophone, percussion, backing vocals
- Rich Brotherton - acoustic guitar, banjo
- Ian "Mac" Lagan - Hammond B3 organ
- Rick Richards - drums
- Ray Bonneville - harmonica
- Brian Standefer - cello
- Eamon McLoughlin - viola
- Paul Mills, Patty Griffin - backing vocals

== Critical reception ==
Thom Jurek at AllMusic praises "her literate American gothic songs about wasted lives, desolate characters who roam the highways like ghosts, shattered dreams, and frustrated expectations."

Jon Lusk's BBC review liked "her searing honesty, gift for gritty stories and willingness to acknowledge the darker side of life, without fear."
