= Volker Koepp =

German documentary film producer (born 1944)

- Born: 22 June 1944 (age 81); Stettin, Pomerania, Germany
- Occupation: Documentary film producer
- Political party: SED

Volker Koepp (born 22 June 1944) is a German documentary film producer.

== Early life ==
Koepp was born in Stettin, a German port city then subjected to a sustained campaign of bombing during World War II. By the time the city was taken over by the Red Army in April 1945, Stettin was virtually deserted, with approximately 6,000 ethnic Germans remaining. Following the ethnic cleansing of the native population after May 1945 Stettin became a Polish city. Koepp's early schooling came in Berlin. Koepp passed his school leaving exam in 1962 in Dresden, German Democratic Republic. On leaving school Koepp trained as a machinist, emerging with a qualification certificate from the Dresden Turbine Factory in 1963. He then studied for two years at the Dresden University of Technology.

From 1965 to 1969 Koepp studied at the Filmuniversität Babelsberg in Potsdam-Babelsberg. Shortly before his graduation, he was deregistered because the authorities noticed his friendship with Thomas Brasch, who had distributed leaflets opposing the Warsaw Pact invasion of Czechoslovakia. Despite his designation as a dissident, former fellow students remember Koepp as a dedicated member of the Free German Youth leadership at the academy, committed to the exposure and expulsion of students identified as guilty of false political motives. He produced a student film called: We have already built an entire city (Wir haben schon eine ganze Stadt gebaut) in 1968, and in 1969 received his degree as a director and script-writer.

== Career ==
Koepp was given a permanent position with DEFA, the East German state-owned film studio, as a documentary film producer in 1970, although he was subject to Stasi oversight and mistrust, particularly with regard to travel restrictions. Koepp produced several long-running documentary sequences, including a series concerning young female workers at a hosiery factory in Wittstock produced between 1974 and 1997, and a series of "landscape films". In 1984 he was awarded the Findling Award for his Leben in Wittstock.

Following the closure of DEFA after German reunification in 1990, Koepp worked as a freelance director, producer and scriptwriter.

== Filmography ==
- 1967 Sommergäste bei Majakowski
- 1968 Wir haben schon eine ganze Stadt gebaut
- 1970 Die Rolle des Meisters im System der sozialistischen Betriebswirtschaft
- 1970 Der Oktober kam
- 1971 Schuldner
- 1971/72 Treffpunkt Kino - 12 Folgen für DDR-TV
- 1972 Musik in Scheiben
- 1973 Grüße aus Sarmatien (Für den Dichter Johannes Bobrowski)
- 1973 Teddy
- 1973 Gustav J.
- 1974 Aus meiner Kindheit (Szenarium)
- 1974 Slatan Dudow-Filmessay über einen marxistischen Künstler
- 1975 Er könnte ja heute nicht schweigen
- 1975 Mädchen in Wittstock
- 1976 Wieder in Wittstock
- 1976 Das weite Feld
- 1977 Ich erinnere mich noch
- 1977 Hütes Film
- 1978 Wittstock III
- 1978 Am Fluss
- 1979 Tag für Tag
- 1980 Haus und Hof
- 1981 Leben und Weben - Wittstock IV
- 1982 In Rheinsberg
- 1982 DEFA-Kinobox
- 1983 Alle Tiere sind schön da
- 1984 Leben in Wittstock
- 1983/1985 Afghanistan 1362 - Erinnerung an eine Reise
- 1985 An der Unstrut
- 1986 Die F 96 - DEFA with Krüger Filmproduktion für NDR
- 1987 Feuerland
- 1988/89 Märkische Ziegel
- 1989 Arkona-Rethra-Vineta - Eine Reise zu versunkenen Orten - DEFA with Krüger Filmproduktion für NDR, WDR, und LA SEPT
- 1990 Märkische Heide, Märkischer Sand
- 1991 Märkische Gesellschaft mbH
- 1991 In Karlshorst - Ö-Filmproduktion für WDR
- 1991 In Grünberg - für ARD-Sendung "Der erste Sommer" Ö-Filmproduktion
- 1991/92 Neues in Wittstock DEFA with LA September.
- 1993 Sammelsurium - Ein ostelbischer Kulturfilm
- 1993 Die Wismut - Ö-Filmproduktion with WDR
- 1994/95 Kalte Heimat - Dok-Babelsberg with WDR und MDR
- 1995/96 Fremde Ufer - Brandenburger Filmbetrieb 96 with WDR, SWF, MDR
- 1997 Wittstock, Wittstock - Kruschke Film- und Fernseh-Produktion with BR, ORB, SFB
- 1998 Schöne Erde Mutterland
- 1998 Die Gilge - Eigenproduktion des SWR
- 1999 Herr Zwilling und Frau Zuckermann - Vineta-Film with MDR, WDR, SFB
- 2001 Kurische Nehrung - Thomas Geyer-Filmproduktion/Vineta Film with SWR/ARTE (IFF Berlin 2001)
- 2001/02 Uckermark - Vineta Film with SWR, WDR, ORB
- 2003 Ewige Orte
- 2004 Dieses Jahr in Czernowitz - Vineta Film with SWR, WDR, RBB, MDR
- 2004 Frankfurter Tor - Chronik TV für RBB
- 2005 Schattenland – Reise nach Masuren - SWR with Vineta Film
- 2005 Pommerland - SWR with Vineta Film
- 2007 Söhne - Thomas Geyer Film with Vineta Film, SWR/WDR
- 2007 Holunderblüte - Vineta Film with SWR/RBB
- 2008 Memelland - SWR with Vineta Film
- 2009 Berlin-Stettin - Vineta Film with SWR/RBB
- 2010 Im Wind - Documentary film for rbb
- 2011 Livland - SWR with Vineta Film
- 2013 In Sarmatien - SWR with Vineta Film
