= Schlosstheater Moers =

Theatre in North Rhine-Westphalia, Germany

Coordinates: 51°26′59″N 6°37′30″E

Schlosstheater Moers is a theatre in Moers, North Rhine-Westphalia, Germany.
