= Orient Blackswan =

Publisher based in India

- Status: Active
- Founded: 1948; 78 years ago
- Founder: Thomas Longman
- Country of origin: India
- Headquarters location: Hyderabad, Telangana
- Distribution: Worldwide
- Key people: J. Nandini Rao (Md); J. Krishnadeva Rao (Director)
- Publication types: Books and academic journals
- Nonfiction topics: Humanities, social science, behavioral science, education
- Owner: J. Rameshwar Rao
- Official website: orientblackswan.com

Orient Blackswan Pvt. Ltd., formerly Orient Longman India, commonly referred to as Orient Longman, is an Indian publishing house headquartered in Hyderabad, Telangana.

The company publishes academic, professional and general works as well as school textbooks, of which the "Gul Mohar" series of English-language school books grew popular. It also publishes low cost reprints of foreign titles.

== History ==
Established in 1948 as Longman Green by the UK publishing company Longman, it was taken over by J. Rameshwar Rao, who bought the majority shareholding and became the company chairman in 1968. Rao retained the majority holding till 1984. The company's board included Khushwant Singh and the Patwardhans of Pune.

The "Indianisation" of Orient Longman's management during this period was also reflected in its product, where Indian writers found an increasingly prominent place. Also during this period various subsidiaries came about such as Orion Books, and Gyan Publishings which sprang up as entrepreneurial enterprises from individuals based in Delhi, Chennai, Mumbai, and Kolkata such as B.K. Todi, Saugat Biswas, Varun Tamble and many others.

== Disputes ==
In 2006, the Pearson Education group, which holds a minority stake in Orient Longman as well as the rights to the "Longman" brand worldwide, sued Orient Longman asserting its claim on the brand. In 2008, Orient Longman agreed to drop the "Longman" suffix in an out-of-court settlement, and the company was renamed Orient Blackswan.
