= Mary Gauthier =

American singer-songwriter (born 1962)

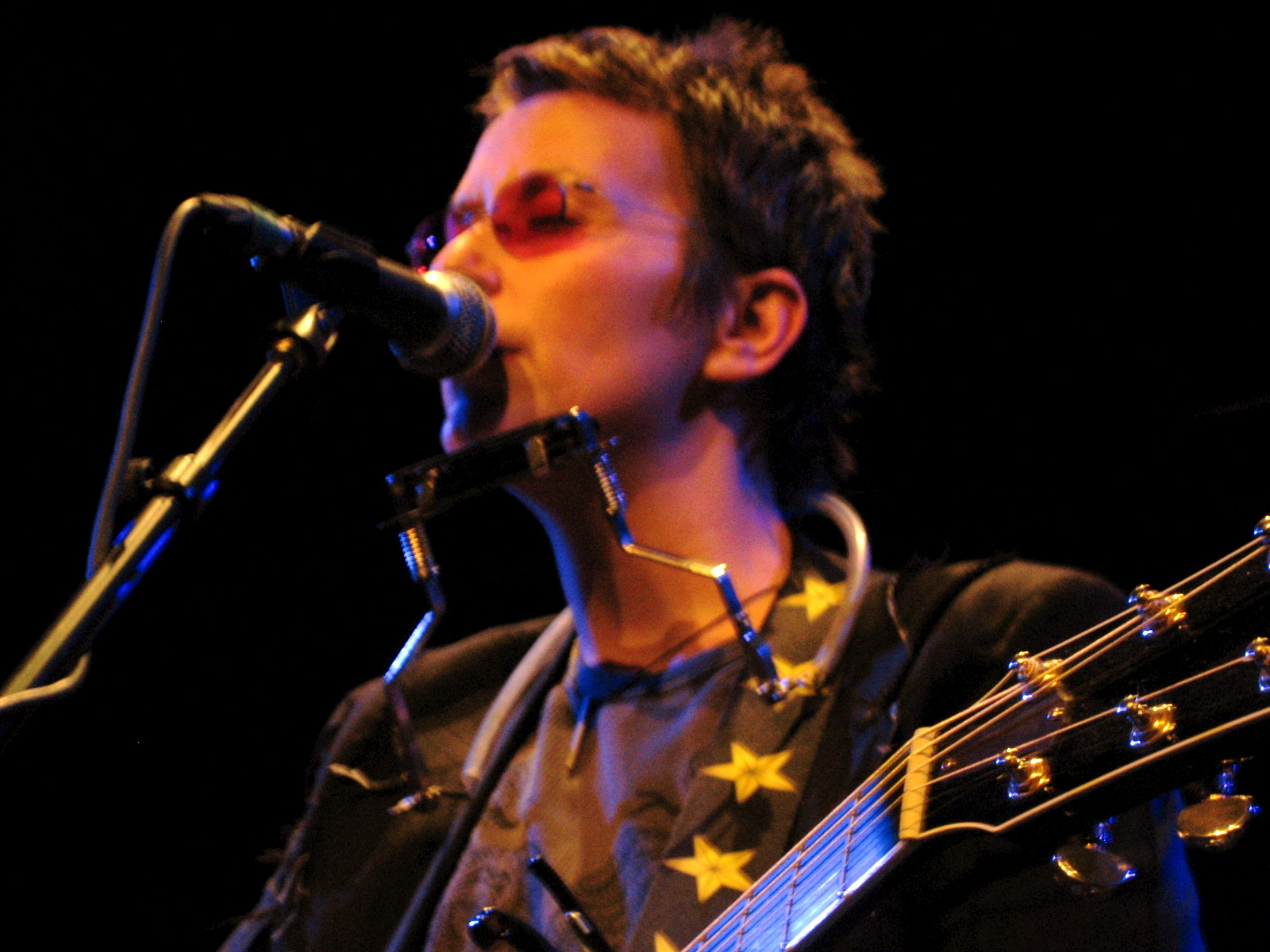
- Gauthier in 2006

Background information
- Born: March 11, 1962 (age 64); New Orleans, Louisiana, U.S.
- Genres: Folk; country; Americana
- Occupations: Songwriter, musician, writing teacher, restaurateur
- Instruments: Vocals, guitar
- Years active: 1990–present
- Labels: Lost Highway, In the Black, Signature Sounds, Proper
- Website: www.marygauthier.com

Mary Veronica Gauthier (/ˈɡoʊʃeɪ/ GOH-shay; born March 11, 1962) is an American folk singer-songwriter and author, whose songs have been recorded by performers including Tim McGraw, Blake Shelton, Kathy Mattea, Vince Gill, Boy George, Jimmy Buffett, Bettye Lavette, Candi Staton, and Amy Helm.

Her songs often deal with marginalization, informed by her experience of adoption, addiction and recovery, and growing up gay in the deep south. Her work demonstrates an "ability to transform her own trauma into a purposeful and communal narrative", such as the lyric "we could all use, a little mercy, now", from her song "Mercy Now".

Her Grammy nominated 2018 album Rifles & Rosary Beads, co-written with military veterans and their families, has been hailed as a landmark achievement.

She has won awards from the Americana Music Association, International Folk Music Awards, the Independent Music Awards, the GLAMA Awards, and the UK Americana Association.

== Early life, addiction and sobriety ==
Gauthier was born in 1962 in New Orleans, Louisiana, to a mother who gave her to St Vincent's Women and Infants Asylum, where she spent the first year of her life. In adulthood, Gauthier spoke to her biological mother once by phone, but there was no further contact between them. She was adopted by an Italian Catholic couple from Thibodaux, Louisiana. Her father was an alcoholic. Struggling with a variety of issues, Gauthier left home young and abused drugs and alcohol, as did her brother, who was three years younger and also adopted. He was later jailed for armed robbery. Gauthier says she had drunk herself unconscious on sloe gin by the time she was twelve.

When she was fifteen she ran away from home, recalling that "I was a gay kid, and back then, that just didn’t fly. Back then, gay kids were beat up, abused, some ended up taking their own lives. It was horrible, and I just wanted to get away.” She spent the next several years in drug rehabilitation, halfway houses, living with friends, and spent her 18th birthday in a jail cell. Later on, she drew on these experiences for her songwriting.

Spurred on by friends, she enrolled at Louisiana State University as a philosophy major, dropping out during her senior year. After attending the Cambridge School of Culinary Arts, and working in an upmarket restaurant, she got financial backing to open a Cajun restaurant in Boston's Back Bay neighborhood, calling it Dixie Kitchen. On opening night, 12 July 1990, she was arrested for drunk driving and has been sober ever since. "I eventually got sober when I was twenty seven years old... I started writing songs in earnest at around thirty two years of age", she says. After achieving sobriety from "[mainly] alcohol, cocaine and heroin", Gauthier continued to manage, and cook at, the restaurant but was increasingly driven to dedicate herself to songwriting.

== Music career ==
Having recorded her debut, Dixie Kitchen, Gauthier sold her share in the restaurant to finance her second album. Drag Queens in Limousines was released in 1998, winning several accolades, and led to appearances at eleven major folk festivals, including Newport. After moving to Nashville in 2001, she secured a publishing deal with Harlan Howard Songs, followed by her third album, Filth and Fire, in 2002. Two years later, she landed a record deal with Lost Highway, a division of Universal Music, and released the first of two albums with them.

=== Mercy Now ===
Mercy Now won widespread acclaim and propelled Gauthier into the spotlight, making the Top Ten Albums list in many publications. A second album for Lost Highway, Between Daylight and Dark, followed in 2007. Gauthier's next studio record, The Foundling (2010), was released by Razor & Tie Records. She then made the first of several albums for In The Black Records, LIVE at Blue Rock (2013), her first live album which was recorded at a ranch outside of Austin, Texas.

Her eighth studio album, Trouble and Love (2014), demonstrated her now familiar "brutal honesty balanced by rough-hewn tenderness" to great effect. The following year, Gauthier featured on Eight 30 Records' Cold and Bitter Tears: The Songs of Ted Hawkins, contributing her take on the late Los Angeles busker's signature song, Sorry You're Sick.

=== Rifles & Rosary Beads ===
Gauthier's next record, Rifles & Rosary Beads (2018), was co-written with U.S. veterans and their families, arising out of Gauthier's involvement with the Songwriting With Soldiers program. Gauthier noted that "[every] day, on average, twenty-two veterans commit suicide", adding that "[underneath] so much of the problems in the world is trauma, it's the central issue humanity is dealing with. We've found something powerful here, that brings hope to people who are hurting".

The album was released to widespread acclaim, and has been described as "music that's just plain important" (The LA Times), and as being "not only the strongest album of her career but, in its own way, a landmark album." It has won several awards, and secured Gauthier her first Grammy Award nomination.

== Accolades, awards and influence ==
Although rarely in the pop/mainstream spotlight, throughout her career Gauthier has won widespread acclaim and numerous awards for her songs. In 2000, Drag Queens in Limousines won Best Folk/Singer-Songwriter Song at the first Independent Music Awards. Gauthier was nominated for Best New Artist at the Boston Music Awards, and also for three Gay and Lesbian American Music Awards (GLAMAs), winning best country artist. In 2002, Filth and Fire was named Best Indy CD of the Year by Jon Pareles of The New York Times. Mercy Now made the 2003 Top Ten Albums list in The New York Times, The LA Times, The Daily News, and Billboard Magazine, and was voted the No. 6 Record of the Decade by No Depression magazine. Gauthier was named New/Emerging Artist of the Year by the Americana Music Association in 2005.

The Foundling was named the No. 3 Record of the Year by The LA Times music writer Randy Lewis, in 2010. In 2015, Gauthier was nominated for the Outstanding Music Artist of the Year at the 26th Annual GLAAD Media Awards. Rifles & Rosary Beads earned Gauthier her first Grammy nomination in the category of Best Folk Album (2019), and won Album of the Year at The International Folk Music Awards. She was also nominated for Album of the Year at the Americana Music Honors and Awards, and named International Artist of the Year by the UK Americana Music Association.

Numerous artists have recorded Gauthier's songs, including Jimmy Buffett, Tim McGraw, Blake Shelton, Bobby Bare, Boy George, Bill Chambers, Mike Farris, Candi Staton, Amy Helm, Kathy Mattea and Bettye LaVette. Mike Farris and Bettye LaVette both received Grammy nominations, LaVette for Best Blues Record (2016) for Worthy, the title track of which was written by Gauthier and Beth Nielsen Chapman. Farris took home the Grammy for Best Roots Gospel Album (2015) for Shine for All the People, which included Gauthier's song "Mercy Now". Her songs have also been featured in several TV shows, including Nashville on ABC, Masterpiece Theatre's Case Histories, Showtime's Banshee, HBO's Injustice and Paramount Network's Yellowstone.

Her recordings have appeared on playlists by Wally Lamb, Tom Waits and Bob Dylan. She wrote a memoir about the art of songwriting, Saved by a Song (St. Martin's Press), which was released in 2021. She is a regular on the Grand Ole Opry, and currently resides in Nashville, Tennessee.

== Education, publications and writing ==
Gauthier's book, "Saved by a Song" was published in 2021 by St Martin's Press. Gauthier's songs are taught at several universities, including Alice Randall's "Country Lyric in American Culture” class at Vanderbilt University. Her short stories have been published in several books and magazines, including Amplified (Random House), The Blue Rock Review, an arts magazine based in Wimberley, Texas, and the Capitola Review, a handcrafted, numbered, limited edition publication.

Gauthier has been featured in various books on country and Americana music, with chapters dedicated to her in "They Came To Nashville", by Marshall Chapman, and "Right By Her Roots: Americana Women and Their Songs", by Jewly Height. Gauthier also features in a Dutch book on country music, "De Bezem Door Nashville (The Broom Through Nashville)", by Harry de Jong, with photographs by Henk Bleeker.

== Discography ==
- Dixie Kitchen (1997)
- Drag Queens in Limousines (1999)
- Filth and Fire (2002)
- Mercy Now (2005)
- Between Daylight and Dark (2007)
- Genesis (The Early Years) (2008) – A 15-track compilation from the first three albums
- The Foundling (2010) – No. 13 Billboard Americana chart
- The Foundling Alone (2011) – Acoustic demos of songs in development, from The Foundling
- Live at Blue Rock (2012) – 11 mixed new and old tracks plus hidden track, "Mercy Now"
- Trouble and Love (2014) – No. 22 Billboard Americana chart
- Rifles & Rosary Beads (2018) – Co-written with U.S. veterans and their families
- Dark Enough to See the Stars (2022)
- Reckoning (2026)

Awards
| Preceded by Mindy Smith | AMA New/Emerging Artist of the Year; 2005 | Succeeded by The Greencards |
| Preceded by | UK Americana Music Association International Artist of the Year; 2018 | Succeeded by |
| Preceded by | Folk Alliance International Record of the Year; 2018 | Succeeded by |
| Preceded by | Grammy Nomination for Best Folk Record; 2018 | Succeeded by |
