= First Look Film Festival =

The First Look Film Festival is a film festival held in Denver, Colorado which screens short films from college students. It was started in 2001 by Wade Gardner and Joshua Weinberg, two film students at the University of Colorado Denver. The festival grew from only screening local Colorado films into an international festival which has screened films from over 20 countries. In 2008 the festival was merged with the Starz Denver Film Festival which is held in October.

As of 2008 the First Look Student Film Festival is the First Look Student Film Section of the Starz Denver Film Festival.

As of 2018 the festival web site is no longer existent and the festival may no longer be held.

== 2007 Festival Details ==
The 2007 First Look Film Festival was held April 19–22, 2008, at the Starz FilmCenter in Denver, Colorado.
