= Diamond (novel) =

2013 children's novel by Jacqueline Wilson

- Author: Jacqueline Wilson
- Illustrator: Nick Sharratt
- Cover artist: Nick Sharratt
- Language: English
- Genre: Children's novel
- Publisher: Doubleday; Yearling
- Publication date: 26 September 2013
- Publication place: United Kingdom
- Media type: Print and audiobook
- Pages: 320
- ISBN: 9780440869863

Diamond is a 2013 children's novel written by Jacqueline Wilson and illustrated by Nick Sharratt. It was initially released on 26 September 2013 in hardcover. It is the fourth novel in Wilson's Hetty Feather series, following Hetty Feather (2009), Sapphire Battersea (2011) and Emerald Star (2012). Set in Victorian England, the story is told from the point of view of eight-year-old acrobat Ellen-Jane Potts, known as Diamond. Diamond is treated cruelly in the circus by her master but also makes good friends there, including Hetty. Wilson initially did not plan to write a fourth novel in the Hetty Feather series but began thinking about Diamond, who debuted in Emerald Star, upon finishing writing that novel. Diamond received a mixed but mostly positive reception. A fifth novel in the series, Little Stars, was released in 2015.

== Plot ==
The novel is set in the 1890s and tells the story of eight-year-old Ellen-Jane Potts, known as Diamond, whose memoir is written by her friend Hetty Feather. In Victorian England, Diamond is born to poor parents who long for another healthy boy. Diamond's mother dies when giving birth to her youngest child, which devastates the family. Diamond uses her acrobatic skills to gain money for her family but this also brings them shame. Diamond is then sold by her father for five guineas to cruel clown Beppo to become an acrobat at Tanglefield's Travelling Circus. Diamond is treated cruelly by Beppo, her master, who forces her to perform more daring tricks, renames her Diamond and beats her after she tries running away. However, the audience love Diamond, and she makes friends with members of the circus, including Madame Adeline, who takes Diamond under her wing, Mister Marvel and his monkeys, and Hetty (known as Emerald Star), who Diamond considers her heroine. Hetty takes over as ringmaster and helps Diamond stand up to bullying. The pair later run away from the circus for a better life when things become too unbearable and dangerous at the circus.

== Publication ==
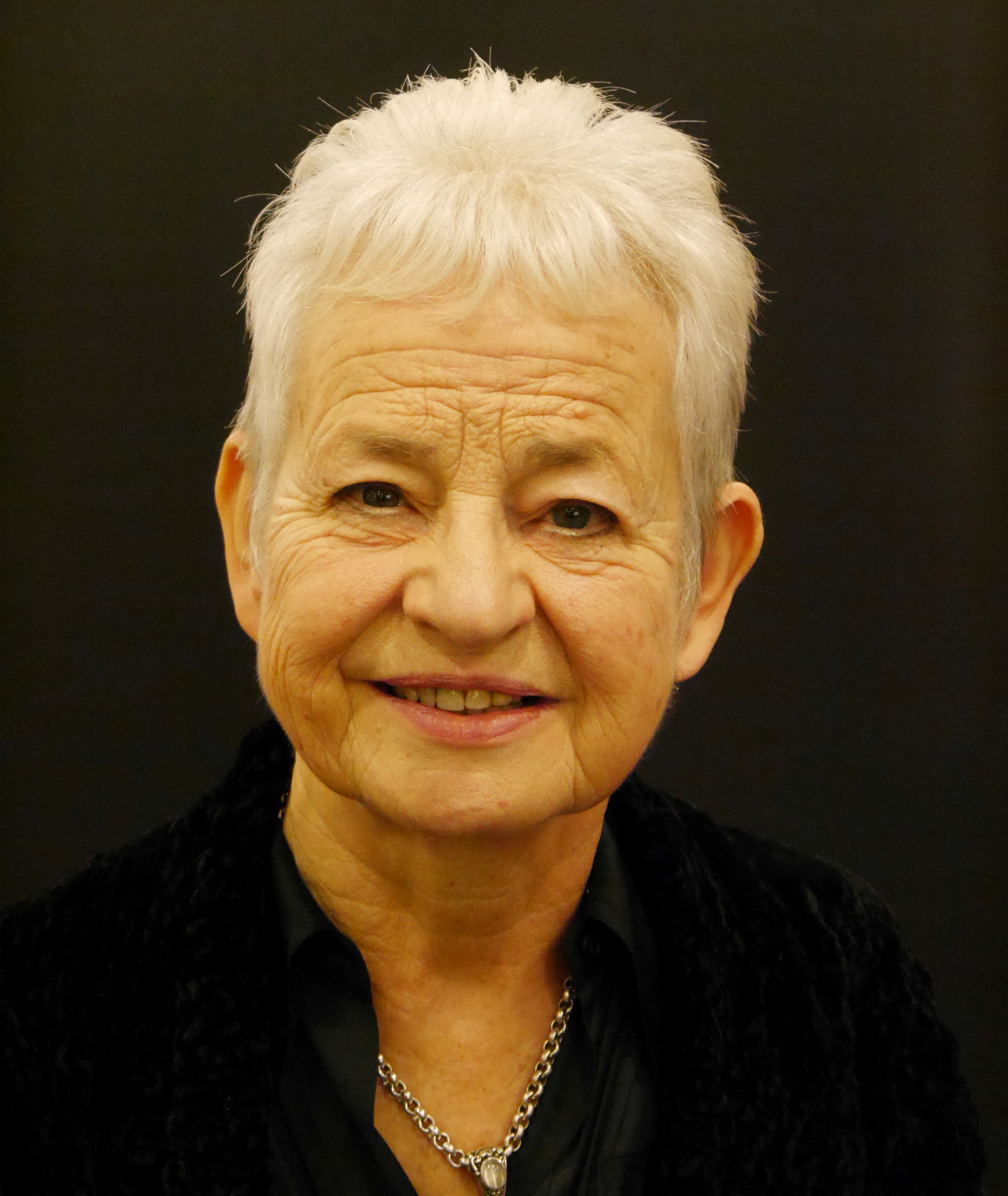
Jacqueline Wilson wrote Diamond as the fourth novel of the Hetty Feather series.

Diamond was written by children's writer Jacqueline Wilson and illustrated by Nick Sharratt. It is the fourth novel in Wilson's Hetty Feather series, following Hetty Feather (2009), Sapphire Battersea (2011) and Emerald Star (2012). Diamond, the titular character of the novel, debuted as a character in Emerald Star. Diamond is told through the titular character's point of view. It is set in Victorian England in the 1890s. Wilson and her publishers believed that Emerald Star would be the final book in the series, but after Wilson finished writing the novel, she began thinking about Diamond, whom she regarded as a "lovely character". The author initially thought she would write a short novel about Diamond, but it became a "huge long book" instead as there was a lot that she wanted to write about the character when Wilson got into the story.

Diamond was originally released on 26 September 2013 in hardcover by Doubleday, part of Penguin Random House. To celebrate the launch of the novel, two child members of The Guardian website dressed up as Hetty and Diamond and interviewed Wilson. A trailer for the novel was released in September 2013. A video of Wilson promoting the book was also released on the official Jacqueline Wilson YouTube channel. The paperback version of the novel was published in 2014.

Wilson believed in 2013 that she would write a sequel to the novel, explaining, "There's a very strong hint at the end of Diamond, that they are going to have a whole new career, maybe on the musical stage. It is fun for me to find out what happens to them all". However, she said that she was focussing on writing several other novels first. Wilson later wrote a sequel, Little Stars, which was published in October 2015. Little Stars was written from Hetty's point of view but featured Diamond a lot in the story, as Wilson's audience was divided on whether they would like the next novel in the series to be about Hetty or Diamond.

== Reception ==
On 13 October 2013, Diamond was listed third in the children's section of the Sunday Independent Bestsellers' list. A week later, it was fourth on the list. In December 2013, Diamond was considered by the Irish Independent to be one of the best children's books "on the market" to give to children for Christmas. Rochelle Gribble from Kiwi Families called Diamond a "solid read for 8–12ish year olds" that had made her "add Jacqueline Wilson books to those that I will be keeping in mind for my girls as they get older"; she praised Wilson's engaging style and the pace of the story, in addition to Diamond (and other female characters) for being a "strong, positive role model for girls" who "faces a raft of challenges with strength of character, is loyal, and brave", although she found the ending to be a bit unsatisfying due to the novel being part of a series.

Caroline Sanderson from Books for Keeps had mixed opinions on the novel, concluding that "Diamond is not a class act perhaps, but you still won't want to walk out before the finale". She criticised the novel for being "baggy", having stilted dialogue and its "paper-thin" plot at times, and she also questioned why Wilson had chosen to write about Diamond rather than Hetty, as Sanderson believed that Hetty was the "most dominant and appealing character" in the second half of Diamond. Sanderson also believed that Wilson was being "rather cavalier" as she did not touch on the welfare of the circus animals in the novel enough, which Sanderson believed that the readers would care about. However, the reviewer also praised Wilson's writing, calling the author a "charming and dependable performer that there is of course still much to enjoy here, particularly with such a colourful troupe of circus artistes. I enjoyed her evocation of the sights and sounds of the big top". Elizabeth Hawksley from the Historical Novel Society enjoyed the novel and believed that Diamond's hard life echoed how many poor Victorian children were forced to live. She also loved the "glimpse into circus life with the lions, the elephants, sea-lions and acrobatic monkeys" and believed that girls over the age of seven would love the novel. The reviewer also wrote, "What Jacqueline Wilson is very good at is depicting children who find love and support even in the most desperate circumstances. She shows that an unhappy child like Diamond can create her own family, knitted together from all sorts of people". She also added that Hetty helps teach Diamond that she can escape from difficult situations "if you are proactive, courageous, and willing to work hard".

Diamond was reviewed several times by children; one of these reviews from The Guardian called the novel "absolutely perfect" with no flaws, praising its character development and believing that it can be "appreciated by any age group". Another from the same website was more critical of the novel due to the story's lack of multicultural characters and the reader's belief that the novel does not "reach to point out many problems in society", though she acknowledged that she enjoyed it more when she first read it at the age of 12. A third wrote that the "great" book made her cry, adding, "In this truly amazing story there is hardship, love and cliffhangers", and that she was looking forward to the next story in the series. An eight year old reviewer from Worcester News praised the novel, recommending it for people to be entertained; she wrote, "I have enjoyed reading this book as much as I did the rest of the Hetty Feather series. I love the character of Hetty, as she is very cheeky at times! I think that Diamond will still be featured in the next book as she and Hetty are now good friends! The end of this one left me hoping that there will be another in the series very soon."
