= Blackguard Children =

Groups of homeless children

The Blackguard Children, sometimes also referred to as the Blackguard Youth, were known as gangs of mostly homeless orphans and runaways who, during the 17th and 18th centuries, dwelled in London's poorest neighbourhoods (such as Glass House Yard, Rosemary Lane, and Salt Petre Bank) and made a living by begging and pilfering. Daniel Defoe's Colonel Jack and Charles Dickens's Oliver Twist are the most prominent examples of novels dealing with such reality.

== History ==
=== Etymology ===
Etymologically speaking, the word "blackguard" seems to have undergone a change between the 16th and the 18th centuries. Originally spelled as two different words, "black" plus "guard", it was eventually used as a single word to indicate those attendants or servants who were in charge of the kitchens, or perhaps black-liveried personal guards. The offensive meaning of "scoundrel", "villain", or any other term which might have suggested the person in question belonged to the criminal world dates back to the late 1730s. Starting from 1784, it was also used as an adjective meant to indicate people of "worthless character" and low social status, such as camp followers and vagabonds.

=== Background ===
In the first decades of the 18th century, London stood out among other European cities for its beauty and maintenance, but it nonetheless had to deal with the utter poverty a huge portion of its inhabitants struggled with. Many people couldn't even afford a proper accommodation for the night, and would either spend the little they had gained during the day through begging and charity to pay for disreputable lodgings or find shelter in barns, haylofts and stables to avoid sleeping rough. In 1796, a survey of the streets of London recorded the existence of more than two thousand adults (mostly women) and three hundred children whose only way of living was begging; London was full of places for them to hide and this enabled them to maintain such a lifestyle for a long time, sometimes even years. Living on the streets and the necessity of surviving any way they could brought paupers and vagrants to engage themselves in a wide range of unregulated occupations, from the illegal ones such as prostitution, to temporary employments as chimney or crossing-sweepers, food sellers, shoeblacks or milkmaids. Many simply sold what they managed to collect on the streets, changed their trade according to different seasons and circumstances, and sometimes took advantage of their professions to obtain charity through their labour, approaching passers-by, begging and pickpocketing. The position they occupied was thus an ambiguous one, set somewhere between mendicancy and service. This was the fate of many children, sometimes not even orphans, but illegitimate children born out of wedlock. What they had in common was that there was no one left to care for them: they were reduced to wearing rags, were food deprived, and gangs were sometimes able to provide that support they lacked, even if joining one usually meant turning to crime. Daniel Defoe describes them as likely to die young, either because of rough weather conditions or starvation.

=== The case of Thomas Coleman ===
Thomas Coleman, aged 11 or 12, was arrested on 4 November 1730 for stealing two dowlas shirts, while his accomplice managed to escape. Forced to a confession, he decided to turn king's evidence, thus providing Justice George Wellham with a detailed list of both crimes and accomplices. Though such an eager deposition was probably meant to avoid prosecution, he was eventually brought to trial at the Old Bailey anyway, and acquitted on 15 January 1731, but in the meantime he had managed to expose an organized criminal gang led by Katherine Collins. Coleman named at least 14 other boys lodging with him in her house, and explained how she forced them all to steal whatever came to hand. She would then buy the stolen items, and refused to give them shelter, were they to come back empty-handed. They would then lay in the near glass house, which Defoe describes in his Colonel Jack:

Those who know the position of the glass houses, and the arches where they neal the bottles after they are made (...), know that those places where the ashes are cast, and where the poor boys lie, are cavities in the brick-work, perfectly close, except at the entrance, and consequently warm.

Within a few years, most of them were caught and faced several different punishments, for either stealing, housebreaking or selling stolen goods. John Collins, Katherine's own son, had already been transported after being found guilty of theft in the summer of 1729. There appear to be further records on the account of someone named Thomas Coleman, but there is no way to be sure they concern the same person.

=== In the proceedings ===
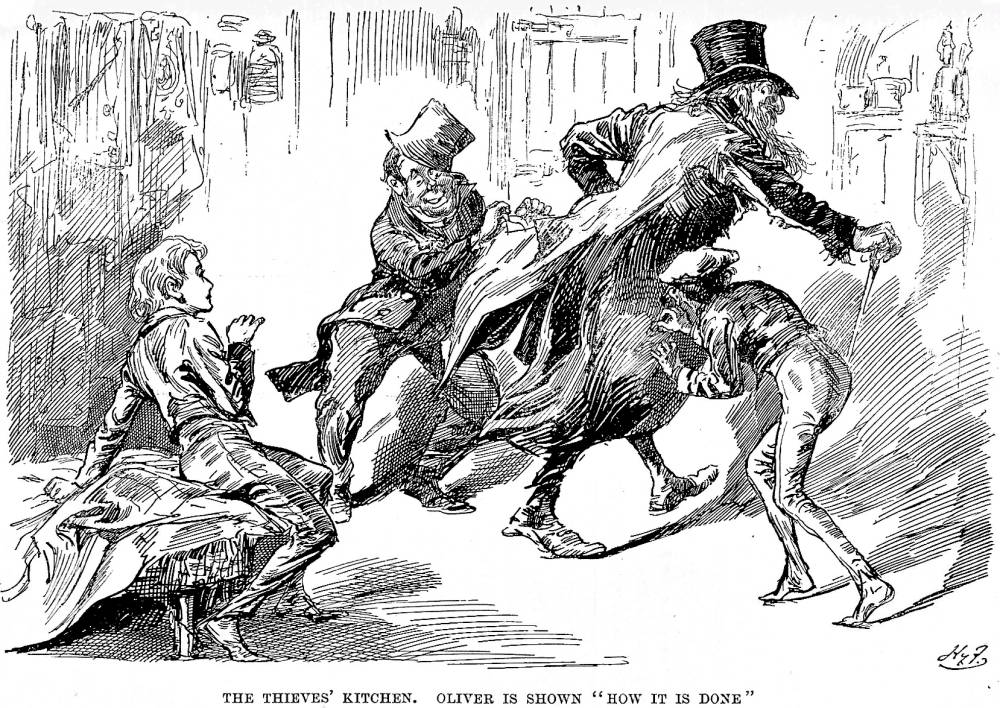
Engraving of Charles Dickens's Oliver Twist

The people those children would steal from often found themselves in only slightly better circumstances, and the stolen items would consist of a few yards of linen, a pair of shoes, some handkerchiefs or anything they could get their hands on. During the eighteenth century, about 125 boys and girls whose age was at most fourteen were tried at the Old Bailey for either theft or violent theft, 77 of whom were convicted of grand larceny. Way below came burglary, theft from a specified place and shoplifting, amongst others. Almost half of them were sentenced to transportation (57 out of 125), 18 were condemned to death, while the others faced several different punishments, or, in a few cases, no punishment at all. Back then, children could be held responsible for their actions from the age of 7 onward (even if they were not considered adults until the age of 14) and could therefore undergo different types of punishments; those who received a death sentence, though, were very likely to obtain a pardon, and be sentenced to transportation instead. In fact, there is no evidence any of the 16 boys and two girls who did receive a death sentence throughout the 18th century has actually been executed. It wasn't until 1847 that a Juvenile Offenders Act was approved, allowing young people under the age of 14 (and eventually 16) to be tried by a special court.

=== Infant mortality rate ===
In the early 18th century, apart from local parishes (and eventually charity schools), the Christ's Hospital was the only establishment able to provide orphans and foundlings with some sort of protection. Together with epidemics and inadequate living conditions, the more tolerant attitude towards violence was a very relevant issue: over 130 trials against infanticide were held at the Old Bailey from 1700 to 1799, and there are records of other more or less sporadic cases of violence, such as the killing of a young girl in the fall of 1720. These factors helped to increase the already high infant mortality rate: in the third decade of 1700, London seems to have witnessed the christening of roughly 150,000 children, but 110,000 under the age of 5 were buried in that same few years.

== In literature ==
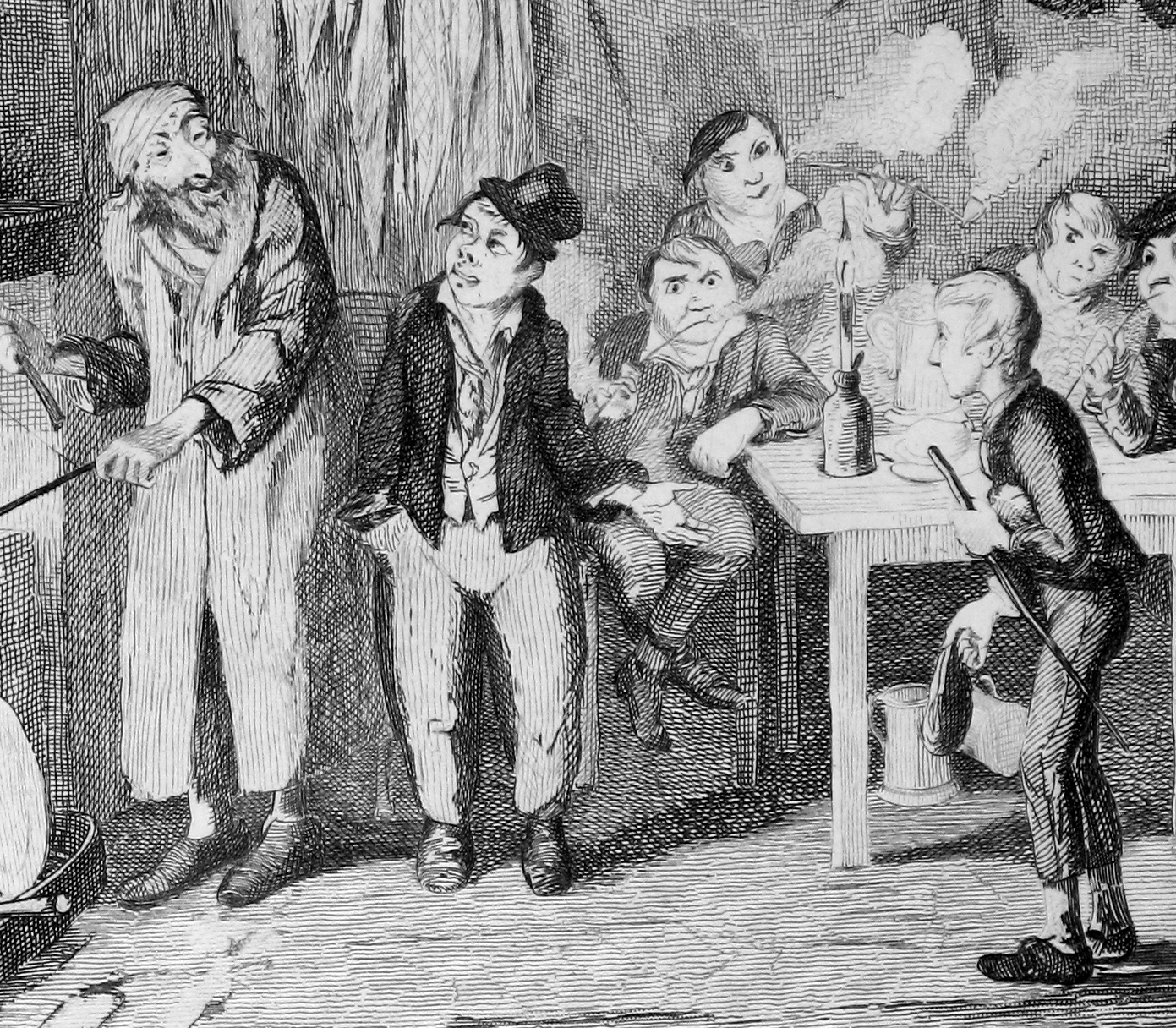
George Cruikshank original engraving of Oliver (right), the pickpocket Artful Dodger (centre), and the criminal Fagin (left)

There is a whole branch of novels dealing with the reality of orphans and their everyday struggles, but Colonel Jack and Oliver Twist, written in 1722 and between 1837 and 1839 respectively, can be named as the most prominent ones describing the life of theft some children turned to. Both stories show how their young protagonists, either orphaned or abandoned, are forced to face the world on their own, and end up assisting criminals or becoming thieves themselves in order to survive. Oliver promptly repents entering a life of crime, and is even wrongly brought to trial for it; very similar is the path the orphan Pip follows in Great Expectations, as he is scared by a convict into stealing. Several stage versions and cinematographic adaptations exist for both of Dickens's novels. On the contrary, Jack becomes an actual pickpocket, and manages to get away with murder several times:

The violence of the blow beat the old gentleman quite down, the bag of money did not immediately fly out of his hand, but I run to get hold of it, and gave it a quick snatch, pulled it clean away, and run like the wind.

His "adventures", though, as he likes to call them, begin to escalate towards more violence and menaces, until his conscience comes into play. His accomplice Will scorns his pity and doubts, and declares him unfit for their business, if he's not ready to go all the way should the circumstances require him to. Jack calls it quit, and goes as far as bringing the money back to a poor elderly woman they had previously robbed, right before Will is captured and sentenced to be hanged. In his preface, Daniel Defoe laments the conditions which bring destitute children to steal by necessity instead of becoming educated and well-principled men, and hopes his readers will find the story instructive.

== Legacy ==
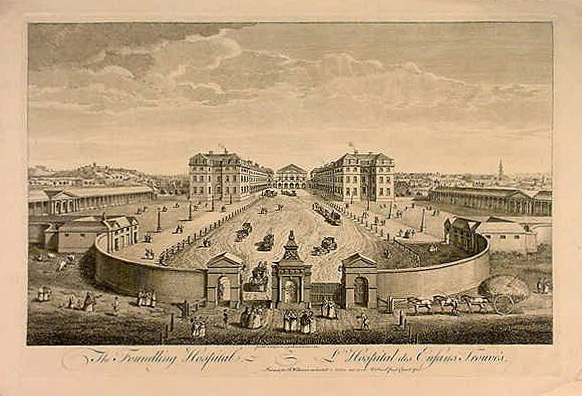
The Foundling Hospital

Within the first two decades of the 18th century, the Society for the Promotion of Christian Knowledge founded charity schools in most London parishes. Its aim was to provide poor children with education and clothing with no or little charge, and to address the issues of both child poverty and under-employment, as they would even try to put them out to trades. The conditions those children were forced to live in, with little or no shelter, food and clothes, as well as Thomas Coleman's confession, might have strengthened Captain Thomas Coram's belief that such a situation needed to be improved. Besides, as mentioned before, children mortality rates were extremely high: only 26 children out of 100 outlived their 5th birthday, and the percentage related to the workhouses was even lower. Coram, whose plan was to save as many as possible, had already been militating for several years when his Foundling Hospital was eventually founded in 1741. Such structure helped setting the ground for the first adoption procedures, and fought against the mentality of the time, which considered destitution and vagrancy a necessary evil. Also, it allowed children to be granted nurturance and an education, sometimes through a foster family, until the age of fifteen, so that they would eventually be able to provide for themselves. The very same aim was shared by other charitable foundations, such as the Lambeth Asylum, founded in 1758, which was meant to rescue from the streets, educate and train orphaned girls and penitent prostitutes.

== See also ==
- Child abandonment
- John Rocque's Map of London, 1746
- Oliver Twist Adaptations
- Pickpocketing
- Timeline of young people's rights in the United Kingdom

== Bibliography ==
- Andrew, Donna T.(1989), Philanthropy and Police - London charity in the eighteenth century, Princeton, New Jersey: Princeton University Press
- Defoe, Daniel (1904), The history and remarkable life of the truly honourable Colonel Jacque commonly called Colonel Jack, New York: National Library Company
- Dickens, Charles (1992), Oliver Twist, Ware: Wordsworth Editions Limited
- Hitchcock, Tim (2007), Down and Out in Eighteenth-Century London, London and New York: Hambledon Continuum
- Hitchcock, Tim & Shoemaker, Robert (2010), Tales from the Hanging Court, London and New York: Bloomsbury Academic
- Shoemaker, Donald J. (1996), International Hankdbook on Juvenile Justice, Westport: Greenwood Press
