= Clover Moon =

2016 novel by Jacqueline Wilson

- Author: Jacqueline Wilson
- Illustrator: Nick Sharratt
- Language: English
- Genre: Children's novel and Historical fiction
- Publisher: Penguin Books
- Publication date: 6 October 2016
- Publication place: United Kingdom
- Media type: Print (hardback, Ebook & paperback) and audiobook
- Pages: 400
- ISBN: 978-0857532732

Clover Moon is a 2016 children's novel written by Jacqueline Wilson and illustrated by Nick Sharratt. It was originally released in hardcover in October 2016, with a paperback version of the novel being released the following year. Clover Moon is set in London in Victorian England and is a spinoff from Wilson's Hetty Feather series. The novel centres around 11-year-old Clover Moon, who lives in poverty with her younger siblings and is abused by her stepmother. The novel features three characters with disabilities, with a reviewer from Books for Keeps praising their portrayals. Wilson drew on her own experiences of her difficult childhood in the novel. An exclusive version of the book also featured The Last Sign, a short story submitted as part of a creative writing competition by a child writer. Clover Moon received generally positive reviews, with Clover's characterisation, the writing and Wilson's descriptions of the hardships that Clover experiences being praised.

== Premise ==
11-year-old Clover Moon lives in Victorian era London with her father, her abusive stepmother Mildred and Clover's six younger siblings. They all live in poverty in Cripps Alley, a slum street, and Clover has to look after her younger siblings rather than Mildred, who does not allow Clover to go to school and beats her. Clover's biological mother died after giving birth to Megs, Clover's young full sister. Clover's father's health is affected by his work at the factory and he spends money that the family cannot afford on alcoholic drinks after his shifts. Clover has two friends who are both disabled: doll maker Godfrey Arthur Fisher (who is often known as Mr Dolly), who has scoliosis and is mocked, and Jimmy Wheels, who is paralysed. Jimmy's family cannot afford a wheelchair and he hence travels on a wheeled board created by Mr Dolly. Clover looks after a baby, and when it is revealed that the baby has scarlet fever, Mildred locks Clover away as she is worried she will infect the other children. Clover does not get infected, but Megs catches it and dies, and Clover subsequently runs away as she does not see a future with Mildred and her father. Clover's friends help her run away and she later meets Mary Anne, who has epilepsy. Clover ends up looking after children in Miss Smith's refuge for distressed girls in London.

== Publication ==
Clover Moon was written by Jacqueline Wilson and illustrated by Nick Sharratt. It is the 105th published novel that Wilson has written. It was originally released in hardcover on 6 October 2016 and was published by Doubleday. A paperback version was released in June 2017. An exclusive version of Clover Moon sold by WHSmith also featured The Last Sign, a short story from Emily Weston; Weston submitted the story when she was 11 years old as part of a creative writing competition that was launched by Wilson and The Guardian, with Wilson commenting that the story stood out to her due to "its use of language and originality". 4000 stories written between 7 and 12-year-olds were entered into the competition. Weston felt "honoured", shocked and proud when she found out her story was being published, saying, "It just doesn’t seem real and I keep thinking I'm having the most amazing dream! [...] I liked writing my story and hope it inspires others to pick up a pen and see where their imagination takes them."

Clover Moon is set in London in the Victorian era. It is a spinoff of the Hetty Feather series which all take place in the Victorian era. The novel draws on Wilson's own experiences of family tension. Wilson began being more publicly open about her difficult childhood – which included fights between her parents and Wilson's mother slapping and smacking Wilson if she did not do what she wanted – shortly before Clover Moon's release following the death of her mother a year prior. The novel features three disabled characters. A trailer for the novel was released in October 2016. A video of Sharratt giving a tutorial on how to draw Clover was also released on the official Jacqueline Wilson YouTube channel later that month.

== Reception ==
Rebecca Butler from Books for Keeps gave the novel five stars and praised the depiction of the three disabled characters in the novel, noting that they are "strong, independent and influential characters in their own right" rather than "victims imprisoned by the social prejudices of their times". Butler also praised Clover for successfully being able to "seize and inspire the attention and respect" of modern readers, believing that modern readers would be able to pay attention to the "predicament of a poverty-stricken girl in Victorian London". She also applauded how the narrative unfolded "expert skill in the hands of this masterly story-teller", commenting on how Clover's abuse by her stepmother is not showed in one "sudden blinding" moment but instead "revealed step by painful step, rendered all the more convincing for that". Donna Ferguson from The Guardian called Clover a "plucky young heroine".

Jill Murphy from The Bookbag dubbed Clover as engaging, imaginative and artistic and called Mildred "wicked" and "a sharp-tongued woman who is free with a beating". Murphy enjoyed Wilson's new historical fiction novel and thought that it was clear that Wilson had researched the period the novel was set in, writing, "There is such a wealth of detail, from the awful toll in bereavement diseases such as scarlet fever took, to the intimate consequences with authorities invading homes and confiscating potentially infected possessions". She noted that Clover's kindness was demonstrated when she looked after children, but also noted that Clover is also "impetuous and tart, sometimes even ever-so-slightly insolent. And she has a fabulous sense of humour and a huge imagination. You could fail to like her or to wish her well". The reviewer also noted that whilst some of the details of living in Victorian England poverty were distressing, there was also positivity throughout the novel in addition to hope from characters that help Clover, with Murphy confessing that she cried when Mr Dolly contrived a funeral outfit for Clover. Murphy called Clover Moon vivid and wrote that it "is the perfect read for middle graders who enjoy historical stories. It portrays the trials and tribulations of life in Victorian England vividly and with compassion." She also thought that the novel was filled with revelations but did not seem "laboured or expository".

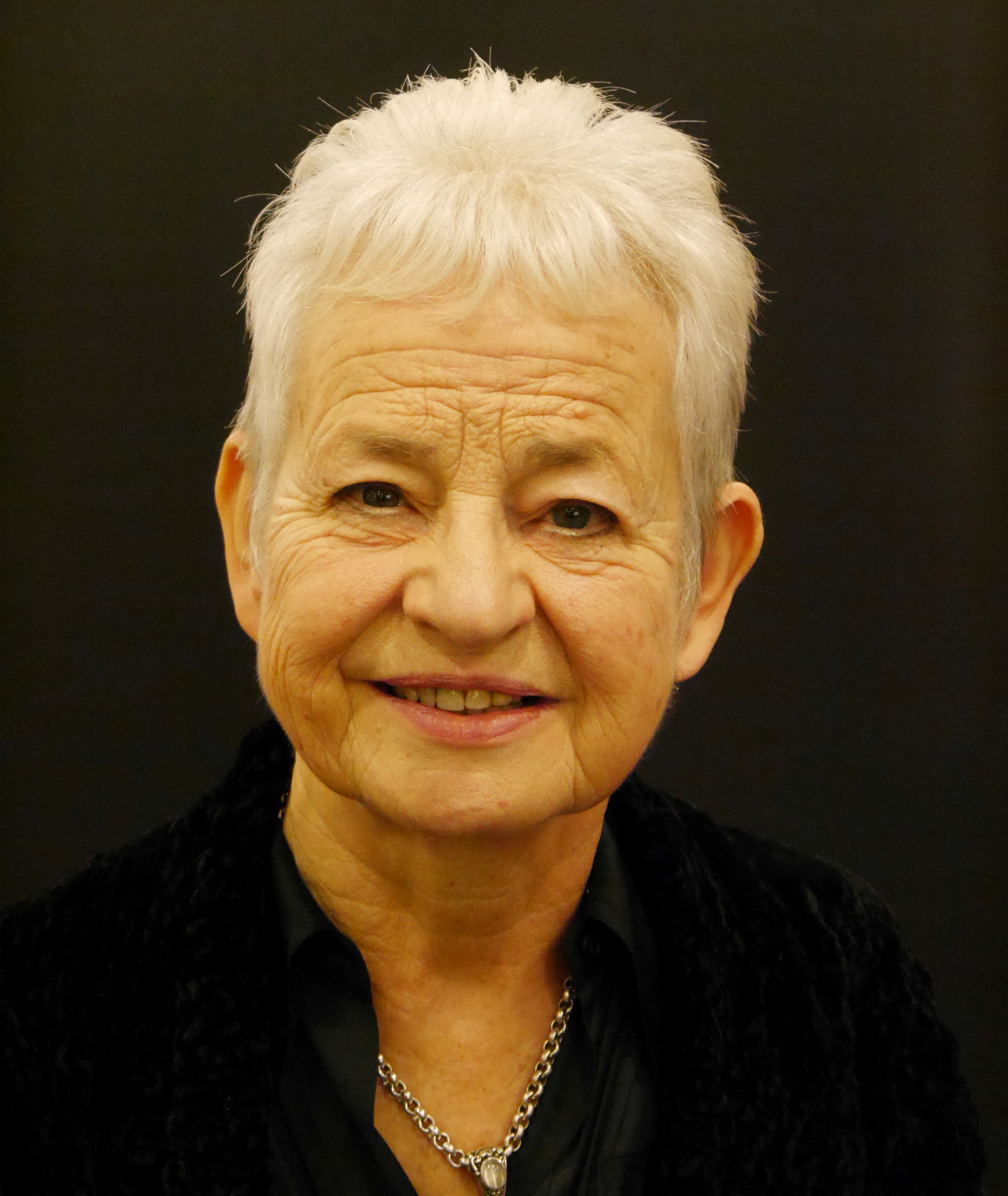
Jacqueline Wilson's writing was praised by reviewers

Several child reviewers from LoveReading4Kids praised the novel. A review from BookTrust called Clover a brave and "intelligent protagonist", commenting that her adventure was both sad and funny and hooked readers until the end. A child reviewer from the Historical Novel Society found Clover Moon emotional and learned about Victorian times from it; they praised Clover's character, calling her "cheeky and daring", but believed the novel was too long. Elizabeth Hawksley, another reviewer from the same organisation, also praised Clover's character, calling her a "real heroine" who is smart, resourceful and brave. She found the "unrelenting grimness" in the first half of the novel overwhelming and was relieved when Clover was able to escape. She commented that Wilson did not "shy away from brutality, grief and loss", adding, "Wilson is very good at getting across the harshness of life for the urban poor without losing touch with her characters' humanity. She doesn't pull her punches but shows the reader that something positive can come out of even the most heart-rending situations."

Sarah Hepworth from TES wrote that children in her year 4 class called the novel "Mind-blowing, mysterious, adventurous, exciting, powerful and moving", commenting that the book explored hard subjects in an "intriguing and sensitive way". Hepworth herself dubbed Clover Moon "dramatic" and believed that the Victorian setting made the novel sometimes difficult to read, though she added that the young students "sympathised with interest and empathy" due to Wilson's descriptions and "delicate word choice". Hepworth noted that the novel engaged girls and boys due to the historical setting, which she believed was rare in fiction for that age group, and wrote, "Expect the children to be shocked but excited by this brilliant book". She also noted that Clover did not have a lot of good luck considering her name, but called her an "excellent example of characterisation" and believed her "grit and determination" was visible throughout the novel. Hepworth added, "I was delighted to see the engagement, interest and inquisitive nature of the class really flourish as they read this book. We loved reading about Clover's experience in the dollmaker's shop and all of us could really imagine her magical doll creation. Audible gasps were heard around the class when we heard about Clover's stepmother's treatment of her."
