= Godalming College =

Location
- Tuesley Lane; Godalming, Surrey, GU7 1RS; England; 51.177°N 0.616°W

Information
- Type: Sixth form college
- Local authority: Surrey
- Department for Education URN: 130828 Tables
- Principal: Emma Young
- Gender: Coeducational
- Age: 16 to 18
- Enrolment: 2500
- Website: www.godalming.ac.uk

Godalming College is a sixth form college, in Godalming, 31 miles (50 km) south-west of London and five miles from Guildford, Surrey. The college had been consistently oversubscribed in years prior to 2010 and has been considered to be one of the best state colleges in the UK. It is the successor to Godalming Grammar School, a state grammar school.

== Academic standings ==
In 2020, Godalming College had a 99.8% pass rate, 67.6% of exam entrants attained grades within the A* to B boundary. In the same year, 100 percent pass rates were achieved in all BTEC courses, with 67.2% of BTEC entrants attaining grades within the Distinction to Distinction* boundary.

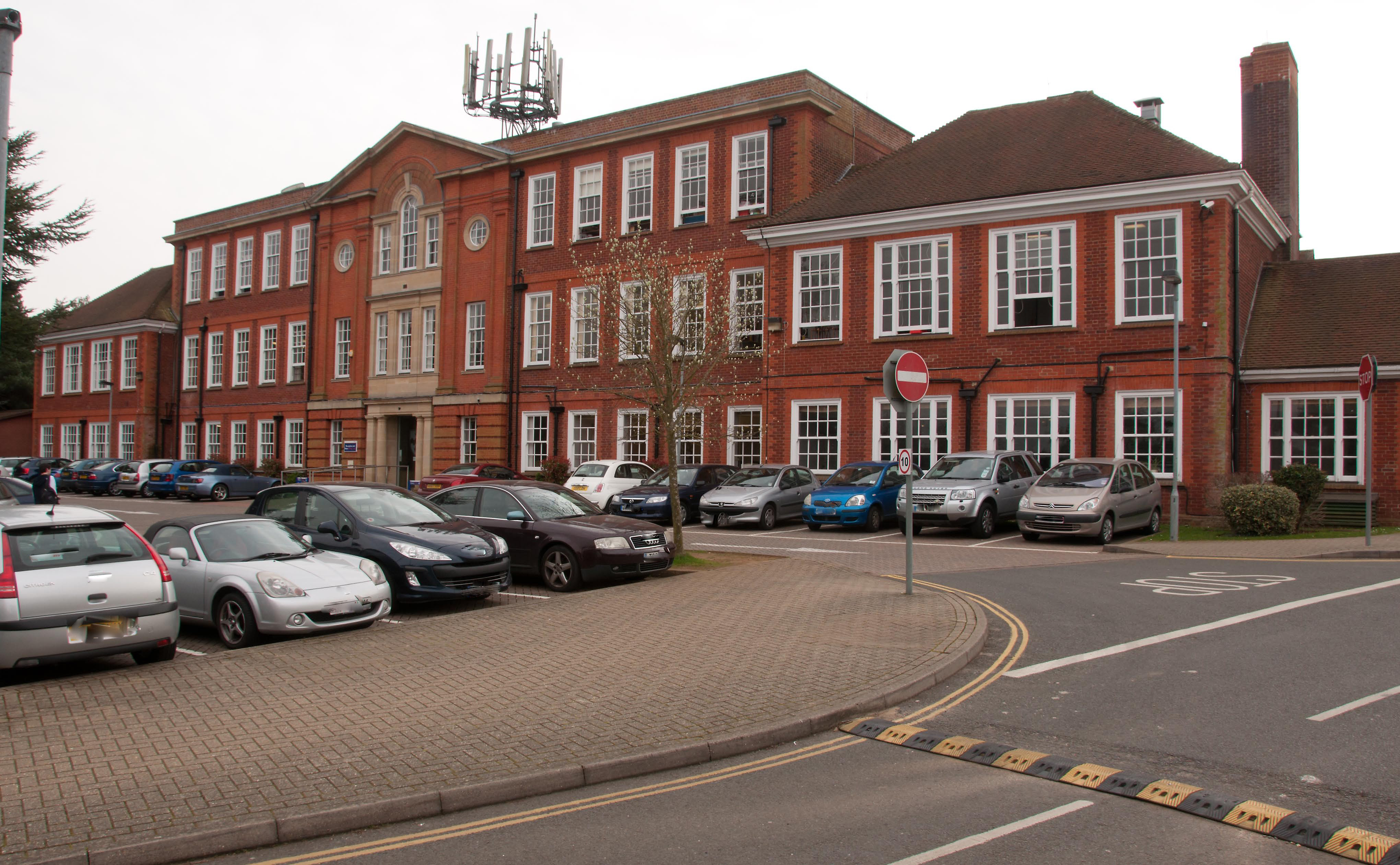
Godalming College

== Ofsted ==
The college retained its 'outstanding' Ofsted status in the December 2019 and November 2024 inspections.

The latest report took place on 20–21 November 2024 was in the form of a short inspection, before that a full inspection took place 3–6 December 2019.

== Design Awards ==
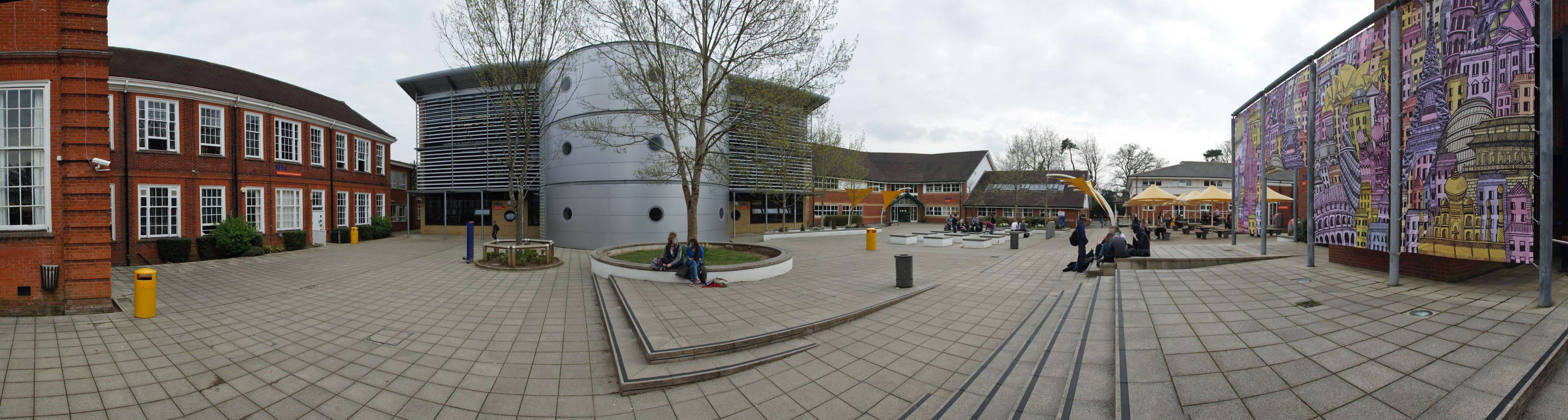
A view of the Piazza, Godalming College 2014

In 2000, the newly completed building achieved the Best New Building Award in the Godalming Trust Civic Design Awards. Since then, three new blocks have been built, including a library block, sports hall and a performing arts building.

== Societies ==
There is a Christian Union at Godalming, there is also a Debating Society, a Harry Potter Society, a Model UN Society, GCTV (a student media enterprise), Chess Club, Games Club and an LGBT society.

== Notable alumni ==
- Tom Ackerley, film producer
- Tim Allan, Downing Street Director of Communications 2025–2026
- Annabelle Apsion, actress (Shameless)
- Max Bowden Actor
- Rikki Clarke, England cricketer
- Ben Elton, comedian and writer
- Alexandra Evans, winner of Britains Next Top Model Cycle 4
- Gabrielle Glaister, actress
- Victoria Hamilton, actress
- Isabel Hardman, journalist at The Spectator
- Rufus Hound, comedian and television presenter
- Rachel Hurd-Wood, actress
- Philip Johnston, Co-founder and CEO of Starcloud
- Ingrid Lacey, actress (Drop the Dead Donkey)
- Andy Salmon, Commandant General Royal Marines
- Simon Shaw, rugby player
- Isaac Stanmore, actor
- Lucy Watson, socialite on Made In Chelsea
