= Colonel Jack =

1722 novel by Daniel Defoe

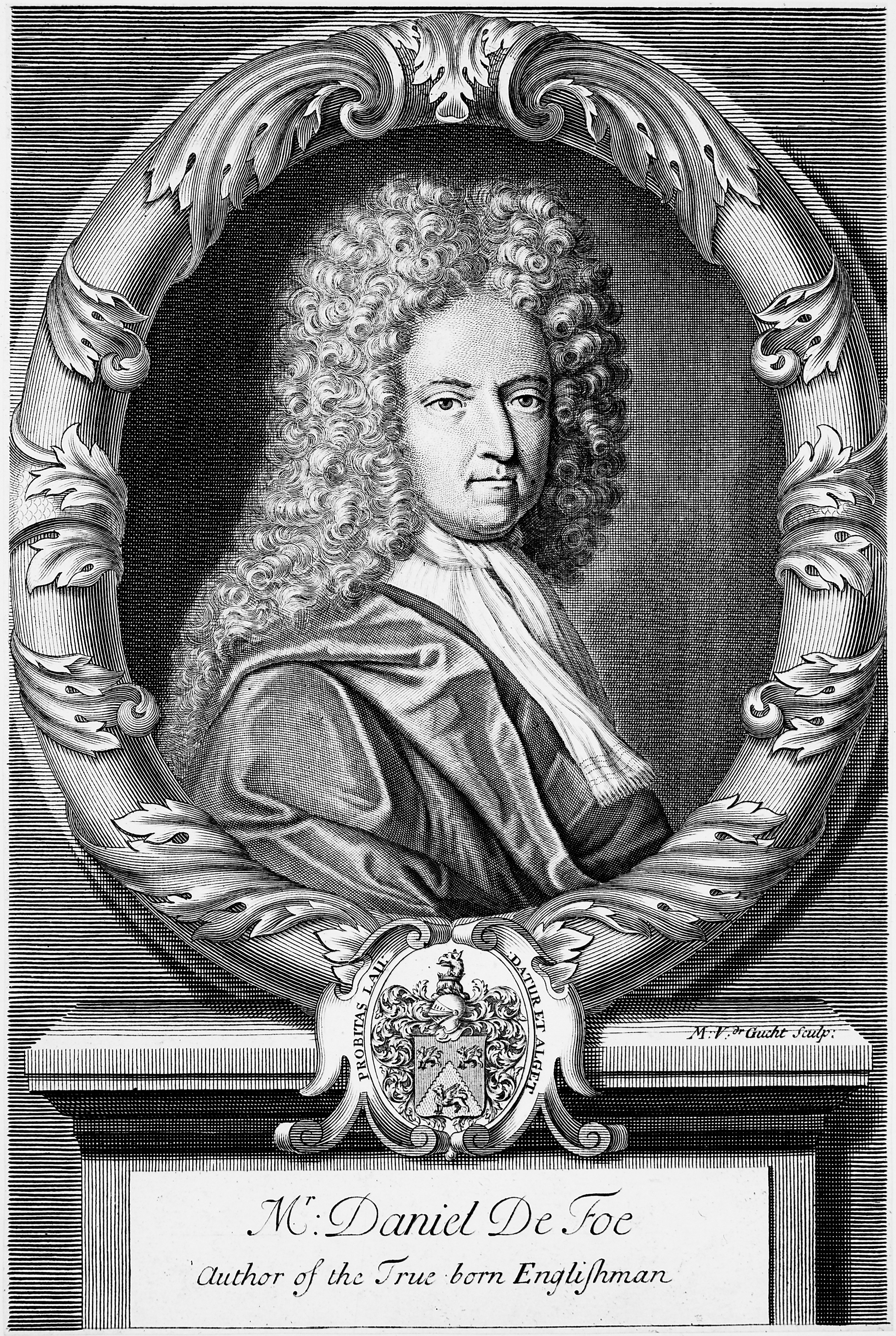
Portrait of Daniel Defoe

Colonel Jack is a novel by Daniel Defoe, first published in 1722. The considerably longer title under which it was originally published is The History and Remarkable Life of the truly Honourable Col. Jacque, commonly call'd Col. Jack, who was Born a Gentleman, put 'Prentice to a Pick−Pocket, was Six and Twenty Years a Thief, and then Kidnapp'd to Virginia, Came back a Merchant; was Five times married to Four Whores; went into the Wars, behav'd bravely, got Preferment, was made Colonel of a Regiment, came over, and fled with the Chevalier, is still abroad compleating a Life of Wonders, and resolves to dye a General.

The picaresque novel can be considered as a crime fiction, along with some of Defoe's other works such as Moll Flanders (1722) and Roxana: The Fortunate Mistress (1724). It shares many plot elements and themes with Moll Flanders, the novels being published only eleven months apart. In common with many of Defoe's other works, Colonel Jack prominently tackles the subjects of money and crime.

== Plot summary ==
The novel begins with Jack as an abandoned illegitimate child, whose attending nurse is instructed by his father to inform Jack when he grows up that he is a "Gentleman". The nurse dubs her own son "Captain Jack" to differentiate him from the two other Jacks under her care, and provides the protagonist with the name "Colonel Jack"; the other she calls "Major Jack". The nurse dies when Colonel Jack is ten, and the three young boys, thrown into the outside world, turn to crime; Colonel Jack becomes the assistant to a pickpocket, Will, and is inducted into the skills of the trade. As the scale and nature of the crimes become more severe, Jack begins to understand the harm he is doing.

After wandering the country with Captain Jack and settling in Scotland for a time, the two join the army but soon desert. Making their way to Newcastle, they are tricked into boarding a boat which they believed to be bound for London, but which is actually headed for Virginia. There they are sold into servitude. Jack serves his time and sufficiently impresses his master to become a plantation owner himself. He becomes a reformed character who repents his past life. On a return voyage to England, his ship is captured by the French, and Jack is landed at Bordeaux, where he is exchanged for a French merchant held by the English. Once back in England, and affecting French manners, Jack takes to calling himself Colonel Jacque. He is beguiled into marriage by a fortune-hunter who does not know the extent of his fortune. His wife proves to be a spendthrift and adulteress, and the marriage ends in divorce. Disgruntled, Jack leaves for France, where he purchases a company of soldiers and fights on the side of the French in the wars of the period. After being taken prisoner by the enemy, Jack becomes embroiled in marriage with a calculating woman, who is again an adulteress. He wounds her lover in a duel, and flees back to London.

Jack marries again, though his wife becomes an alcoholic and an adulteress, and finally drinks herself to death. He remarries, but leaves the country after being involved in the unsuccessful Jacobite rising of 1715. He chooses to resettle in Virginia, his new wife, Moggy, having died in the meantime. There Jack encounters his divorced wife, reduced to being a housekeeper on his plantation, with whom he is reconciled and remarries. The colony becomes flooded with captured Jacobite rebels, transported there as punishment. Worried for his own security, Jack and his wife flee to the West Indies under pretence of illness, where he eventually learns of a general pardon of the remaining rebels and that consequently he is a free man. Returning to Virginia to join his wife, who has already made her way back to manage their business interests, Jack's ship is captured by the Spanish, and he finds himself taken to Havana. In spite of being a prisoner, he manages to profit handsomely from illicit trading adventures and soon returns to Virginia. Jack starts to trade on a regular basis with his Spanish contacts, but has to take refuge amongst them when his presence is discovered by the authorities. Pretending to be Spanish, Jack lives comfortably enough for some time, and has further thoughts of repentance and religion. The novel ends with Jack speaking of his intentions to travel to Cadiz, then from there to London, to be rejoined by his wife from Virginia.

== Themes ==
Published only eleven months apart, Colonel Jack shares many plot elements with another of Defoe's works, Moll Flanders. Amongst these similarities are: both Moll and Jack are orphans; they marry five times; they turn to crime initially from desperation; are wrongly arrested in the process; are transported as Indentured servants to America; become rich plantation owners; benefit from the advice of a teacher; reunite after many years with a lost spouse, with whom they live out their last days. In both cases, the narrator reports to have returned to England at the closure of the novel. Similarly, they both aspire throughout to a state of gentility—Moll from the influence of seeing those around her as a child, Jack after being informed it is his birthright—and both eventually achieve this. Consequently, and in common with Defoe's other fiction, major themes of the novel include the value of money, and the law and criminality.

== See also ==
- Blackguard Children

== Sources ==
- Gladfelder, Hal (2009). "Defoe and criminal fiction". In John Richetti (ed.). The Cambridge Companion to Daniel Defoe. Cambridge: Cambridge University Press. ISBN 0521675057.
- Lynch, Deidre Shauna (2009). "Money and character in Defoe's fiction". In John Richetti (ed.). The Cambridge Companion to Daniel Defoe. Cambridge: Cambridge University Press.
- Mack, Ruth (Winter 2011–12). "'Seeing something that was doing in the World': The Form of History in Colonel Jack". Eighteenth-Century Fiction. 24 (2).
- O'Brien, John (1998). "Union Jack: Amnesia and the Law in Daniel Defoe's "Colonel Jack"". Eighteenth-Century Studies. 32 (1). JSTOR 30054268. (subscription required)
- Sim, Stuart. "Daniel Defoe: The History and Remarkable Life of the Truly Honourable Colonel Jacque, Commonly Called Colonel Jack". The Literary Encyclopedia. (subscription required)

== Legacy ==
In Captain Charles Johnson's The Lives and Exploits of the Most Noted Highwaymen (1734), there appears to be the history of Colonel Jack, and a nineteenth-century penny dreadful was also based on his life.
