= Emma Brownlow =

English painter

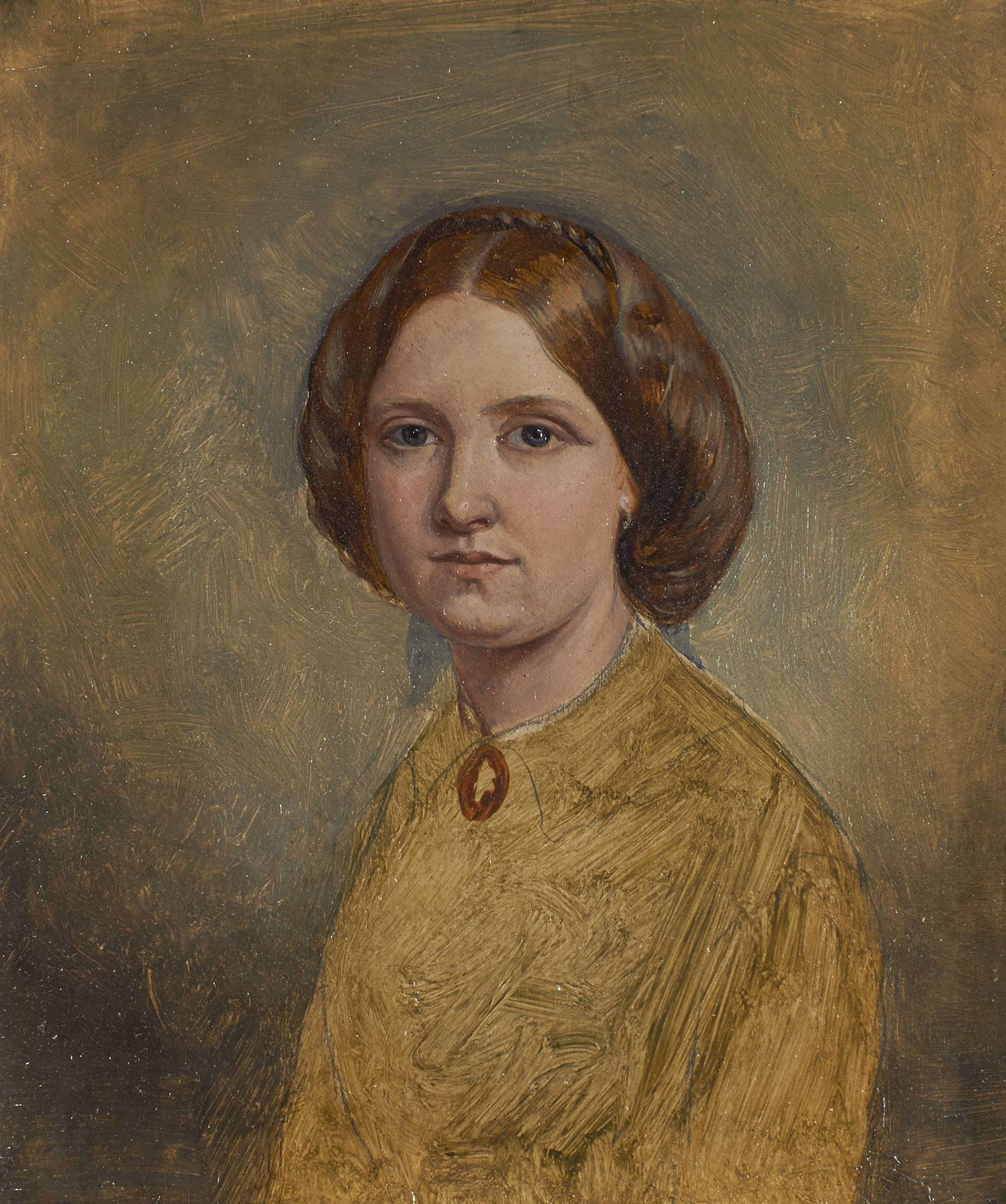
- Born: 28 September 1832; London
- Died: 1 January 1905 (aged 72); Mottingham
- Occupation: painter
- Spouse: Donald King

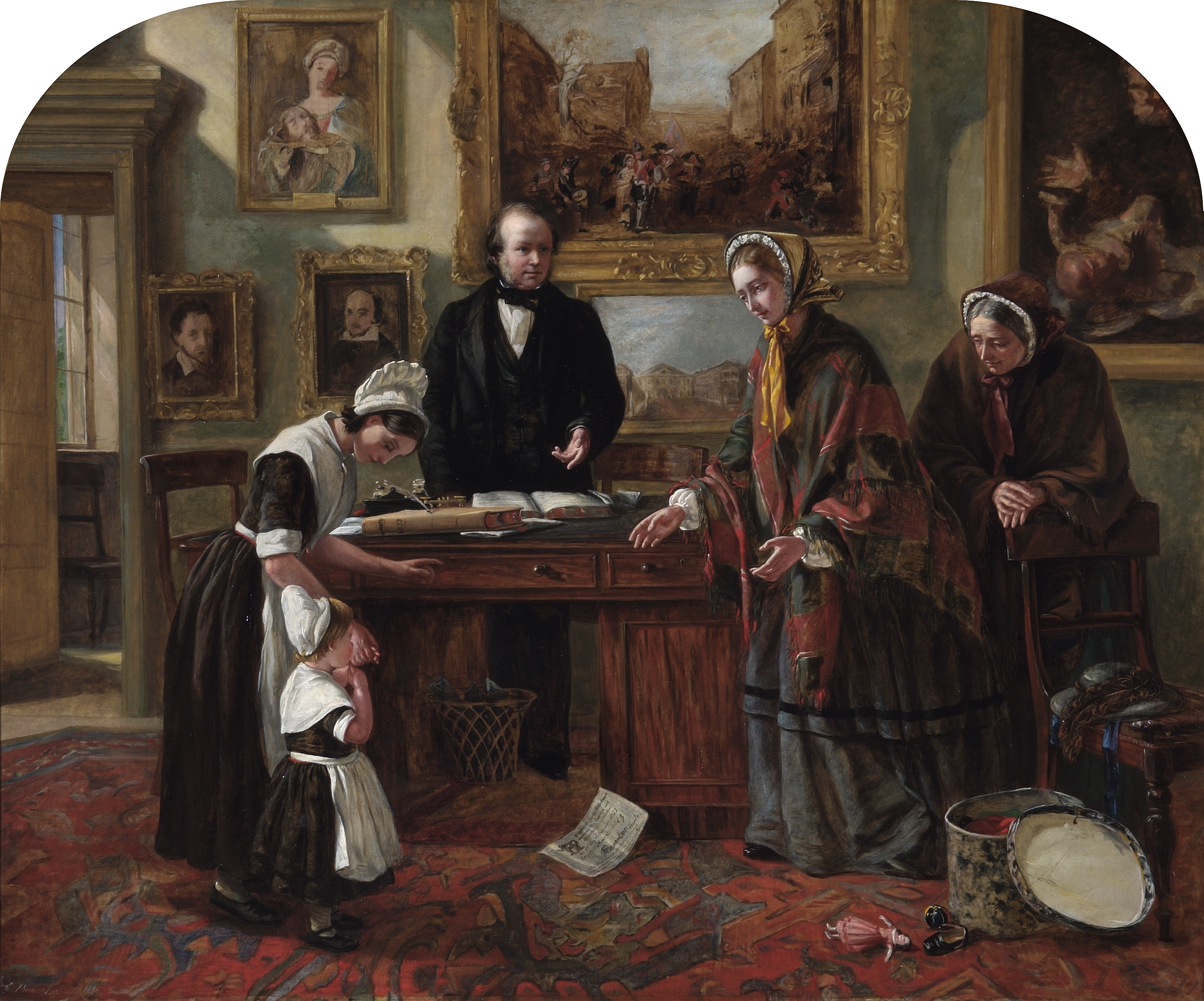
The Foundling Restored to its Mother (1858) by Emma Brownlow, depicting her father John Brownlow (behind desk)

Emma Brownlow (28 September 1832 – 1 January 1905) was a Victorian era artist who is best known for her paintings depicting scenes from life at the Foundling Hospital in London.

== Life ==
Emma was the youngest child of Johanna (born Parker) and John Brownlow, a foundling who had been a foundling brought up in the Foundling Hospital. He had started work as a clerk aged 14 and he had risen within the institution to become its director.

John Brownlow had written several books about the institution, and a novel Hans Sloane (1831). The novel was an influence on Charles Dickens's later novel Oliver Twist, and its author is believed to be the model for the character Mr. Brownlow. Dickens was a friend of the Brownlow family.

Emma became an artist, producing a series of paintings in the 1850s and 1860s depicting scenes from life at the hospital. She also painted portraits and genre subjects. She exhibited at the Royal Academy of Arts. Her most notable painting was The Foundling Restored to its Mother, exhibited at the RA in 1858.

She met the man she would marry, Donald King, through her involvement with the Hospital choir. King was a professional singer. Emma died 1 January 1905 in Kent. She was buried with her daughter Marian Brownlow King on the Isle of Wight, UK.

== Work ==
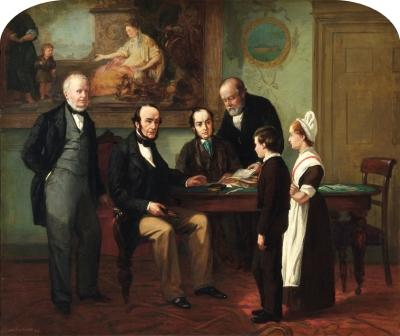
Taking Leave (1868), depicting children about to leave the Foundling Hospital to enter the wider world.

Brownlow created four paintings in the same format depicting scenes from Foundling Hospital life and are permanently displayed at The Foundling Museum. The first oil painting, dated from 1858, is titled The Foundling Returned to its Mother and is the most prominent painting of the four, depicting a mother of a foundling receiving her child back into custody. Her next painting was done in 1863, The Christening, followed by The Sick Room (1864), an oil on canvas painting depicting a romanticized version of a child being cared for in the Foundling Hospital. The fourth painting is titled Taking Leave (1868) and shows the process of a foundling preparing to begin work. The paintings are noted not only for their representation of the Foundling Hospital, but for their inclusion of reproductions of famous paintings in the Hospital's collection; including two major works by William Hogarth and one by Benjamin West. Catherine Roach notes that Brownlow's reproductions of Old Master paintings "stage a drama of redemption" for Foundling children using submerged representations of glorious causes. Rachel Bowlby argues that these paintings "carried on her father's work, promoting the virtues and values of the institution through pictures of its daily life and rituals." Brownlow also painted smaller works depicting foundling children as well as portraits.
