= Foundling Museum =

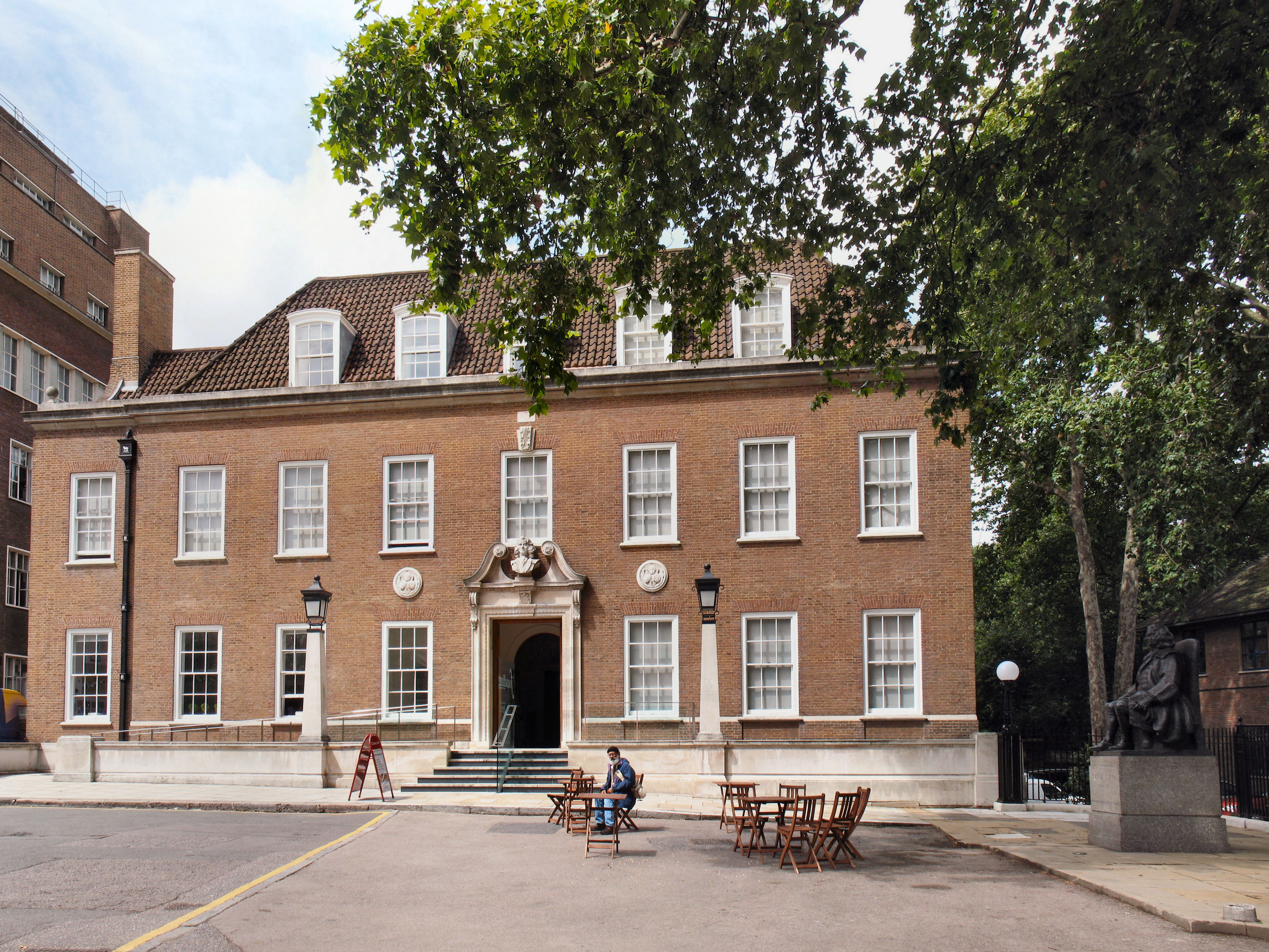
- The museum's façade, Brunswick Square. A statue of Thomas Coram is to the far right.

- Location within Central London
- Established: 2004; 22 years ago
- Location: Brunswick Square; London, WC1; United Kingdom
- Coordinates: 51.525278°N 0.121667°W
- Type: Art gallery, Museum
- Visitors: c. 40,000 per year
- Director: Emma Ridgway
- Public transit access: Russell Square
- Website: foundlingmuseum.org.uk

The Foundling Museum in Brunswick Square, London, tells the story of the Foundling Hospital, Britain's first home for children at risk of abandonment. The museum houses the nationally important Foundling Hospital Collection as well as the Gerald Coke Handel Collection, an internationally important collection of material relating to Handel and his contemporaries. After a major building refurbishment, the museum was reopened to the public in June 2004.

The museum explores the history of the Foundling Hospital, which continues today as the children's charity Coram. Artists such as William Hogarth and the composer George Frideric Handel are central to the Hospital story and today the museum celebrates the ways in which creative people have helped improve children's lives for over 275 years. It is a member of The London Museums of Health & Medicine group.

== History ==
The Foundling Hospital was established by the philanthropist Thomas Coram in 1739. After 17 years of tireless campaigning, Coram was finally granted a Royal charter by King George II, enabling him to set up the UK's first children's charity in Bloomsbury, London. By the early 1920s the hospital was no longer removed from the pollution of the city; it had been subsumed into central London. The trustees of the Hospital decided to relocate operations to a modern purpose-built facility in Berkhamsted. In 1926, the land occupied by the former Hospital in Bloomsbury was sold off and the building torn down. Between 1935 and 1937 the Thomas Coram Foundation (now known as Coram) built a new headquarters at 40 Brunswick Square. The new building incorporated architectural features and Rococo interiors from the original Foundling Hospital building.

The Foundling Museum was established as a separate charitable organisation in 1998. To safeguard and display the collection a deal was agreed in 2002 under which Coram lent the pictures to the museum, allowing it to raise money to buy them over a 25-year period.

The headquarters was refurbished between 2003 and 2004 by the architectural firm Jestico + Whiles. In 2013 attorney general Dominic Grieve wrote to Coram stating that he was concerned that Coram's "treatment of the museum ... does not appear to fit with the spirit and intent of the arrangements put before the attorney general [in 2001]".

In June 2023, Emma Ridgway was appointed the CEO and Artistic Director, replacing Caro Howell MBE who had held the post since 2011.

== Collections ==
The museum is responsible for the care and maintenance of two collections – the Foundling Hospital Collection and the Foundling Museum Collection, which includes the Gerald Coke Handel Collection. These Collections span the eighteenth to the twentieth century, enabling visitors to make connections between the past and the present. The Foundling Hospital Collection includes works of art by some of Britain's most prominent eighteenth-century artists: William Hogarth, Thomas Gainsborough, Joshua Reynolds, Louis-Francois Roubiliac and many others. These paintings and sculptures, donated by the artists themselves, were given in order to support the Foundling Hospital and effectively made the institution the UK's first public art gallery.

The museum's Collections also encompass everyday objects used in the Foundling Hospital and archival materials; books, documents and records, musical scores and librettos, photographs and oral history recordings, as well as clocks, furniture and interiors, many of which were created especially for the hospital and donated by their makers. Some of the most moving objects are the Foundling Hospital tokens – including coins, buttons, jewellery and poems – left by mothers with their babies on admission, enabling the Foundling Hospital to match a mother with her child should she ever return to claim it. The overwhelming majority of the children never saw their mothers again and the tokens are in the care of the museum.

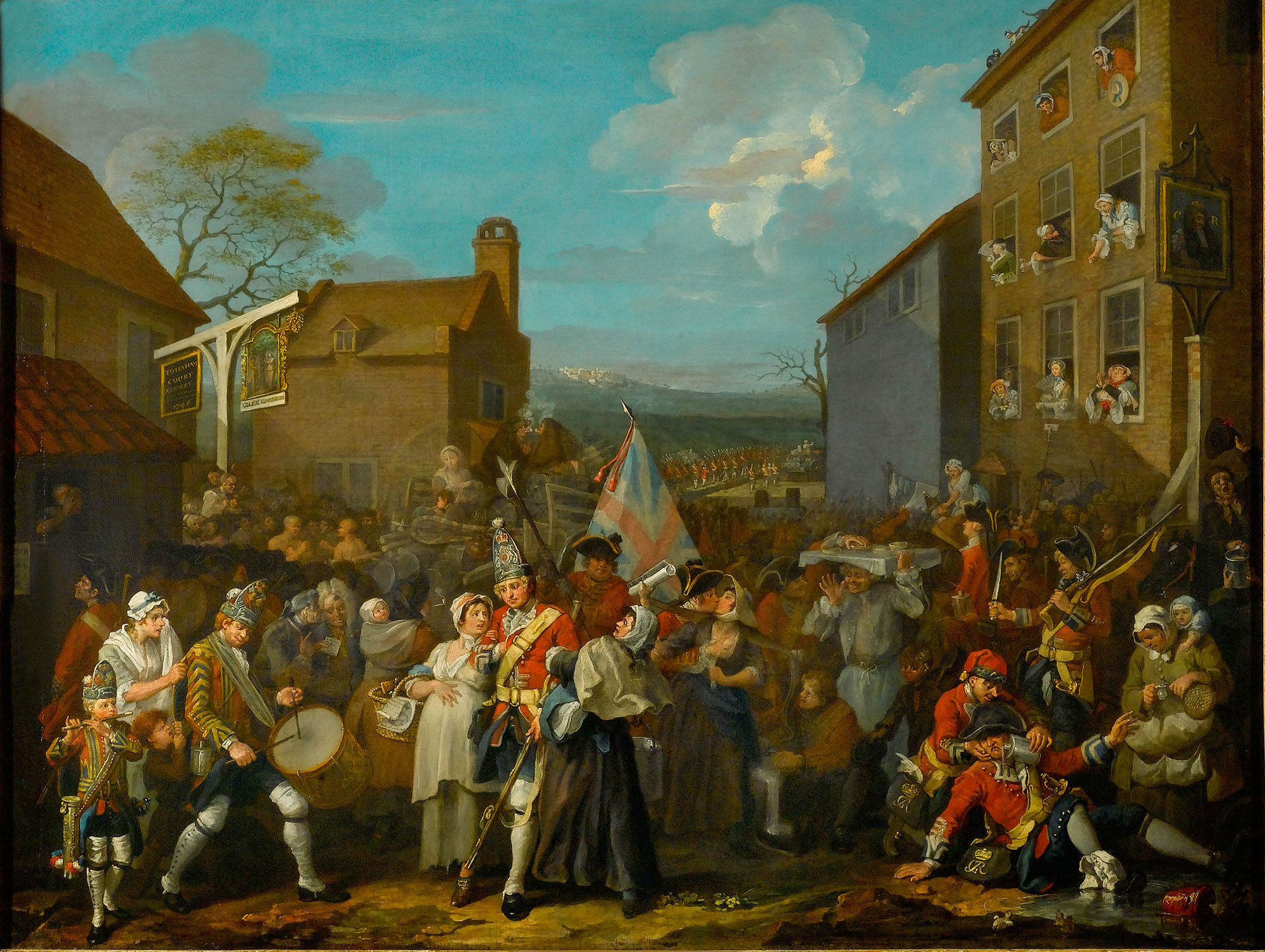
March of the Guards to Finchley (1750), William Hogarth's satirical masterpiece, won by the Foundling Hospital in a raffle.

The Committee Room, a reconstruction of one of the original Hospital interiors, is one of the rooms where mothers intending to leave their babies would be interviewed for suitability. It now displays paintings, sculpture and furniture, including Hogarth's satirical and political The March of the Guards to Finchley and a series of paintings by the nineteenth-century artist Emma Brownlow, depicting scenes from the lives of the children in the Foundling Hospital.

The Picture Gallery is a reconstruction of the original Picture Gallery in the West Wing of the hospital. On the walls are paintings of governors and Hospital officials through the ages. These portraits include William Hogarth's magnificent painting of Thomas Coram, Allan Ramsay’s portrait of Dr Richard Mead, Reynolds' portrait of the Earl of Dartmouth, and Thomas Hudson’s portrait of the hospital's architect, Theodore Jacobsen.

The Court Room is where the Foundling Hospital's Governors conducted their committee business and entertained important guests. This room is one of the best surviving Rococo interiors in London, with a magnificent plasterwork ceiling given as a gift to the hospital by plasterer William Wilton. Paintings include Hogarth's Moses before Pharaoh’s Daughter and Gainsborough's picture of London's Charterhouse.

The uppermost floor of the Foundling Museum houses the Gerald Coke Handel Collection. Visitors can learn about Handel's connection to the Foundling Hospital and see his Will he left behind, alongside manuscripts and printed scores, books, works of art, programmes and ephemera. A fair copy of Handel's Messiah, left to the hospital at his death, is also displayed. Four armchairs with built-in speakers play nine hours of Handel's music.

In 2008, a small bronze sculpture, of a mitten, in the Baby Things series, was made by Tracey Emin. In 2010, the Foundling Museum acquired a painted bronze sculpture, attached to a wrought iron fence, referencing a "lost mitten".
