= Isaac Stanmore =

English actor

- Born: 16 November 1988 (age 37)
- Education: Bristol Old Vic Theatre School
- Occupation: Actor
- Years active: 2012-present

Isaac Stanmore (born 16 November 1988) is an English actor best known for playing Saul in the stage adaptation of Hetty Feather and Young Arthur Bullimore in The Incredible Adventures of Professor Branestawm.

== Early life ==
Stanmore went to Godalming College before training at the Bristol Old Vic Theatre School.

== Career ==
Stanmore made his professional debut in 2012 in Wild Oats at the Bristol Old Vic. As part of the Patron's Prize he starred in all in-house productions at the Bristol Old Vic for six months including Wild Oats, Does My Society Look Big In This? and Peter Pan in which he played John Darling. In 2013 he toured with the Lord Chamberlain's Men playing Rosalind in As You Like It. In 2014 he originated the role of Saul in the stage adaption of the Jacqueline Wilson novel Hetty Feather. Following a UK tour the production transferred to the West End marking Stanmore's West End debut. The show was subsequently nominated for a Laurence Olivier Award for Best Entertainment and Family. at the 2015 Laurence Olivier Awards.

His theatre credits include Robin & Marian (New Vic theatre 2016), Dracula (New Vic Stoke, 2015); Saul in Hetty Feather (Rose Theatre, Kingston, Vaudeville Theatre, UK Tour, 2014); Macbeth (UK Tour, 2014); Rapunzel (Lawrence Batley Theatre, 2013); Rosalind in As You Like It (Lord Chamberlain's Men UK Tour, 2013); Peter Pan (Bristol Old Vic, 2012); Does My Society Look Big In This? (Bristol Old Vic, 2012); Wild Oats (Bristol Old Vic, 2012); Knives In Hens (Greenwich Theatre, 2012); White Boy (National Youth Theatre, Soho Theatre, 2008).

Stanmore made his screen debut in the 2014 BBC 1 Christmas Eve special The Incredible Adventures of Professor Branestawm in which he portrayed a young Ben Miller.
