= Emma Ridgway (curator) =

British curator

Emma Ridgway is a British curator and museum director. She has been Chief Executive Officer and Artistic Director of the Foundling Museum, London, since June 2023.

== Education and fellowships ==
Ridgway holds degrees in fine art, art history, and curating from Goldsmiths, University of London, and the Royal College of Art. She is a Clore Cultural Leadership Fellow.

== Career ==
Ridgway began her curatorial career at the Serpentine Gallery, London, the Barbican Centre, and the Royal Society of Arts, before joining Khoj International Artists Association in New Delhi. She subsequently joined Modern Art Oxford, where she was Chief Curator, Head of Exhibitions and Learning from 2015, leading the institution's artistic programme.

In 2022, Ridgway curated the British Pavilion at the 59th Venice Biennale in collaboration with artist Sonia Boyce. The resulting exhibition, Feeling Her Way, was awarded the Golden Lion for Best National Participation . She subsequently co-selected John Akomfrah as the artist commissioned for the British Pavilion at the 60th Venice Biennale in 2024

In 2023, Ridgway was appointed Chief Executive Officer and Artistic Director of the Foundling Museum, London.

== Publications ==
Ridgway's publications include Sonia Boyce: Feeling Her Way (Yale University Press), Ruth Asawa: Citizen of the Universe (Thames and Hudson), Anish Kapoor: Painting, and Marina Abramović: Gates and Portals (Koenig Books).

Ridgway edited Experiment Marathon: Hans Ulrich Obrist & Olafur Eliasson (Koenig Books, 2009), a publication documenting the Serpentine Gallery Experiment Marathon events held in London in 2007 and Reykjavik in 2008.
