= Emerald Star =

2012 novel by Jacqueline Wilson

- Author: Jacqueline Wilson
- Illustrator: Nick Sharratt
- Language: English
- Genre: Children's novel
- Publisher: Random House Children's Publishers UK
- Publication date: 23 September 2012
- Publication place: United Kingdom
- Media type: Print (paperback)
- ISBN: 9780440869856
- Preceded by: Sapphire Battersea
- Followed by: Diamond

Emerald Star is the third novel in the Hetty Feather series by British author Jacqueline Wilson, published in 2012. The story starts with Hetty arriving at an inn in her late mother's old village a few weeks after the events of Sapphire Battersea.

Although Emerald Star was originally intended by Wilson and her publishers as "the final volume about Hetty Feather", she subsequently went on to publish Diamond and Little Stars.

== Plot ==
The story starts with Hetty Feather searching for her long-lost father in Monksby, her late mother's old village. She finds most residents of the village are cold and unwelcoming, and has very little success identifying her mother by her old name, Ida. She finally locates her father, Bobbie Waters, who is emotional and guilty about having abandoned Hetty's mother and never having known he has a daughter – he welcomes her into his family and reveals to Hetty her mother's real name – Evie.

However, he already has a family of his own – his wife Katherine, with whom Hetty shares an instant hatred and rivalry, and their children Mina and Ezra, who are equally reluctant about her. Katherine doubts Hetty's parentage due to the fact that Hetty has only known her mother by a moniker, and cannot confirm whether she's the same person Bobbie abandoned. Hetty establishes an uneasy friendship with her half-siblings, but finds it difficult to fit in the tight-knit, fishing-oriented community of Monksby. At one point, she writes to Sarah Smith, her friend and governor at the Foundling Hospital, to confirm her parentage. Miss Smith soon writes back, confirming her mother's real name and, by extension, her being Bobbie's daughter.

Hetty realizes she has more family in Monksby – namely Samuel, her maternal grandfather, whom she resolves to visit. Samuel is aggressive towards Hetty and threatens her off his property. She bitterly realizes she won't fit in Monksby, and soon receives a letter from Jem, telling her the news of her foster father's death. She decides to leave to attend the funeral.

Though Hetty feels equally unwelcome among her foster family, she receives a warm welcome from Jem and befriends his childhood friend, Janet. After the funeral, she starts living with Jem and taking care of their now disabled mother while Jem works at the farm. Soon after, Gideon, her other foster brother, returns from the Army with a missing eye. Hetty starts to become fed up with doing the same things every day. Jem and Hetty spend Christmas with Janet's family. Hetty soon finds Janet's diary and discovers that Janet is in love with Jem.

The circus returns and Hetty reunites with her childhood idol, Madame Adeline, and meets a little girl called Diamond, who is terrified of her abusive master, Beppo. After falling in love with the circus all over again, Hetty joins the circus as the ringmaster. After a final goodbye to Jem, Hetty leaves for a new life.

== Sequels ==
Although originally intended to be the last in the series, it is followed by Diamond, a story which follows Diamond, a girl Hetty met in the circus during Emerald Star. Which is then followed by Little Stars which follows both Hetty and Diamond after the events of Diamond.
