= Dowlas =

Plain coarse cloth similar to sheeting

Dowlas was a strong coarse linen cloth of the 16th and 17th centuries, and initially, it was manufactured in Brittany. In the 18th century the fabric was also produced in England and Scotland. Dowlas was identical to sailcloth. The cloth was also imitated in cotton for the same use.

== Mentions ==
The word is spelled in many different ways, but dowlas is the common way of spelling adopted in factories, and it appears in the same form in Shakespeare's Henry IV, part 1, Act III scene 3. The dowlas of the early twentieth century was a good, strong and closely woven linen fabric.

== Use ==
Dowlas was a plain cloth, similar to sheeting, but usually coarser. It was made in several qualities, from line warp and weft to two warp and weft, and was used chiefly for aprons, pocketing, soldiers' gaiters, linings and overalls. The finer makes were sometimes made into shirts for workmen, and occasionally used for heavy pillow-cases.
