= Sapphire Battersea =

2011 novel by Jacqueline Wilson

- First edition
- Author: Jacqueline Wilson
- Illustrator: Nick Sharratt
- Language: English
- Genre: Children's novel
- Publisher: Doubleday
- Publication date: 2011
- Publication place: United Kingdom
- Media type: Print (paperback)
- Preceded by: Hetty Feather
- Followed by: Emerald Star

Sapphire Battersea is the 2011 sequel to Hetty Feather, written by English author Jacqueline Wilson. It is the second installment in the Hetty Feather Trilogy. The story continues where Hetty Feather left off. Hetty, now 14 years old, is discharged from the Foundling Hospital and begins life as a scullery maid.

== Plot ==
After finding out that Ida, the kitchen maid of the Foundling Hospital is her mother, Hetty regularly sneaks into her room at night to bond with her. Hetty dreams of being a successful author, writing stories under her true name, Sapphire Battersea. However, one night, Hetty is followed by another girl, Sheila Mayhew, who often bullies her. Hetty and Ida's relationship is found out and as a result, Ida is fired and is sent away to Bignor-on-Sea (named after Bignor but based on Bognor Regis and Middleton-on-Sea) as a housekeeper to an elderly woman by Miss Sarah Smith, a member of the Board of Governors and a friend of Hetty's. When the time comes for Hetty to be discharged from the hospital, Miss Smith arranges for Hetty to be sent to Mr. Charles Buchanan, a fellow writer, as a scullery maid in the countryside of Kingtown. As Hetty is picked up by Mr. Buchanan's cook, Mrs. Briskett, a young man calls out to her and unsuccessfully tries to chase down the cab she was in. This young man is later revealed as Hetty's former foster brother, Jem.

After spending most of her childhood cooped up in the Foundling Hospital, Hetty is often confused, scared and in awe by the outside world. As she settles into her job, Hetty becomes a secretary of sorts to Mr. Buchanan, copying his stories as Mr. Buchanan's handwriting is hard to read. In return, Mr. Buchanan agrees to help refine Hetty's memoir, and to supply Hetty with stamps so she can continue to write to her mother. She also finds a potential love interest in Bertie, the local butcher's boy, who takes her out to the fair, on a boat ride, and for a walk in the park. Hetty also accompanies the parlourmaid, Sarah, to a seance with Madame Berenice, a medium. During the seance, an apparition of Hetty's long-dead foster brother, Saul, appears before Hetty, frightening her.

Hetty's new life is soon shattered when she accuses Mr. Buchanan of plagiarising her work after she finds a poorly written manuscript of her memoir in his office under the name Emerald Greenwich. Hetty is immediately fired. Before she leaves, Sarah gives Hetty her suitcase and Mrs. Briskett gives her a jar full of money as well as some food to take with her. Hetty goes to see Bertie for the last time before setting off to Bignor to be with her mother.

On the train to Bignor, Hetty makes friends with the kindly Greenwood family. Hetty reunites with her mother, but is shocked to see how sickly she has become. She calls for a doctor who diagnoses Ida with consumption. When the doctor breaks the news to Miss Roberts, the woman Ida was caring for, she fires Ida on the spot and refuses to hire Hetty—for fear that they would infect her. Ida is admitted to an infirmary while Hetty stays with the Greenwood family for two weeks. She becomes like a part of the family, while continuing to visit Ida. The Greenwoods offer to take her with them when they leave Bignor, but Hetty declines. She gets a job at Mr. Clarendon's Seaside Curiosities as "Emerald the Amazing Pocket-Sized Mermaid", making a tail out of a green dress, a bodice of pink gauze and a scallop-shell bra. While working here, Hetty makes friends with Freda, a female "giant". Ida succumbs to her illness and eventually dies in Hetty's arms. With Freda's help, Hetty holds a funeral for Ida.

Hetty returns to Kingtown and goes to see Madame Berenice for a seance, with the hope of contacting her now-deceased mother. During the seance, Hetty finds out that Madame Berenice and her sister/accomplice are frauds, but decides not to expose them, as it provides hope (however fake it may be) for Madame Berenice's other clients. Sarah, who was at the seance, takes Hetty back to Mr. Buchanan's house for slice of rabbit pie. In the kitchen, Hetty meets Mr. Buchanan's new servant girl, Rose-May, who reveals that Bertie is now taken with her. Upon hearing this, Hetty runs to the outhouse and vomits. While lamenting the fact that she's truly an orphan now, she hears Ida's voice informing her that she isn't an orphan- her father is still alive. The book ends with Hetty declaring "I am Sapphire Battersea," with her intent to seek out her father.

== Characters ==
- Hetty Feather (Sapphire Battersea): The protagonist. Now fourteen-years-old, red haired Hetty is discharged from the Foundling Hospital and put to work as a scullery maid for writer Charles Buchanan but is fired when she accuses him of stealing her memoirs. After spending most of her childhood inside the Foundling Hospital, Hetty is rather out of touch with the outside world, being frightened by a dog, not knowing how to crack open a coconut among other things.
- Ida Battersea: Kitchen maid of the Foundling Hospital and Hetty's mother. After their relationship is found out, Ida is fired and sent away to the seaside town of Bignor to be a housekeeper to the elderly Miss Roberts. Ida is diagnosed with consumption and it eventually claims her life.
- Bertie: The Butcher's boy and eventually, love interest for Hetty. Prior to the story, Bertie accidentally sliced off the top of three of his fingers on his left hand and was also in a workhouse at some point. After Hetty leaves Kingtown, he becomes taken with Mr. Buchanan's new servant, Rose-May, telling her he'd make a tippet out of rabbit skins for her. Bertie is constantly known for flirting with girls, including Hetty, Rose-May, and the two girls from the draper's shop.
- Mrs. Briskett: Mr. Buchanan's cook, described as a large, meaty woman. She disapproves of Madam Berenice and her seances, as they go against her Christian morals. She is very talented at baking.
- Sarah: Mr. Buchanan's parlourmaid, described as looking like a potato. Sarah, is a regular client of Madame Berenice's seances. Hetty chooses not to expose Madam Berenice as a fraud mainly for Sarah's sake.
- Mr Charles Buchanan: Hetty's master and an author, described as looking and acting like a monkey. Hetty finds his stories to be painfully dull and unreadable. He fires Hetty after she accuses him of stealing her memoirs and trying to turn it into a story of his own under the title of Emerald Greenwich.
- The Greenwood Family: Mr & Mrs. Greenwood, Charlotte, Maisie and Flora: A kind family visiting Bignor for two weeks. They allow Hetty to stay with them and for a while she almost becomes a part of the family. While they propose that Hetty goes home with them to Arundel, Hetty knows deep inside that this will never work out. Nevertheless, they give Hetty their address and encourage her to visit them. Hetty describes them as being the most kindest people she's ever met.
- Madame Berenice & Emily: A medium who holds seances. Hetty finds out that she and her sister, Emily, are frauds. Madame Berenice pretends to be possessed by the dead while Emily covers herself in a white veil, pretending to be a ghost.
- Miss Sarah Smith: An author, member of the Board of Governors and Hetty's ally. She gives Ida a good reference to help get her a job when she's fired from the Hospital and recommends Hetty to Mr. Buchanan. Hetty enjoys reading her stories.
- Rose-May: Mr. Buchanan's new servant. She's described as being small, fair with big blue eyes. She's a devout Baptist who refuses to go to Madame Berenice's seances. Hetty finds her repulsive.

== Sequels ==
The book is followed by Emerald Star which was released 27 September 2012. The series continues with Diamond which is about a girl who Hetty met in Emerald Star. This is followed by Little Stars which follows Hetty and Diamond after the events of Diamond.
