= Hetty Feather =

2009 novel by Jacqueline Wilson

Hetty Feather by Jacqueline Wilson
- First edition cover
- Author: Jacqueline Wilson
- Illustrator: Nick Sharratt
- Cover artist: Nick Sharratt
- Publisher: Doubleday
- Publication date: 2009
- Publication place: United Kingdom
- Pages: 309 pp (first edition, hardback)
- ISBN: 978-0-385-61444-3 (first edition, hardback)
- Followed by: Sapphire Battersea

Hetty Feather is a 2009 novel by English author Jacqueline Wilson. It is about a young red-haired girl who was left by her mother at the Foundling Hospital as a baby and follows her story as she lives in a foster home before returning to the Foundling Hospital as a curious and bad-tempered five-year-old. There are more books to the "series" of Hetty Feather, which are recommended for ages 9–11 according to the author. CBBC created a TV series based on the book, with Isabel Clifton portraying Hetty. The programme was first aired in 2015. In the United States BYUtv has the US broadcast rights and began airing it in March 2018.

The book is followed by Sapphire Battersea. The series comprises (in order of publication) Hetty Feather, Sapphire Battersea, Emerald Star, Diamond, and Little Stars. There are also two books (Clover Moon and Rose Rivers) ,which are part of the world of Hetty Feather.

== Plot ==
The spirited and imaginative Hetty was abandoned at the Foundling Hospital as a newborn baby. Children abandoned at the hospital are in foster care or fostered until the age of five, at the nearest date when they turn 5 years old they will be returned to the hospital to start their education. Hetty spends her earlier life as a foster child under the care of Peg and John Cotton, who she knows as her mother and her father, and grows close to their biological son, Jem. She is unaware that she will one day have to leave the Cottons. There are other foster children in her home as well as Peg and John's own children. One day, she discovers a circus, where she meets Madame Adeline, whom she believes to be her mother because of her bright red hair, which is very similar to Hetty's own.

The time comes for Hetty and Gideon to be sent back to the Foundling Hospital. Everyone in the family is devastated, and Jem and Hetty promise to find each other again with a coin to remember each other. Hetty finds her time in the hospital miserable and oppressive, and often rebels or otherwise talks back in an environment where she is expected to be meek and obedient. This earns her the animosity of the hospital's Matrons, who punish her severely. Despite that, she manages to make friends among fellow foundlings and even staff, including Ida, a kind kitchen maid.

When Hetty is a little older, the children at the Foundling Hospital go to the Queen's Golden Jubilee. On the trip, Hetty sees a circus and believes it is the one that Madame Adeline belongs to. When she discovers it is not, Hetty manages to run away to find the right one and Madame Adeline along with it. Upon meeting her, Hetty is upset to discover that Adeline is much older than she appears, that her red hair is a wig, and that Adeline cannot bear children. Madame Adeline is kind to her but tells her she must return to the hospital. Hetty once again runs away but stumbles into a bad district where she is nearly kidnapped by a sinister man until an older girl who sells flowers named Sissy saves her. Sissy takes Hetty to her home, where she meets her terribly ill sister, Lil, and her drunkard father. Sissy and Hetty go out to sell flowers the following day, whereupon they are approached by a writer named Sarah Smith. Miss Smith takes Sissy and Hetty to a restaurant, where she asks questions for her new book Penny for a Posy and Hetty spins an elaborate tale of her life as a flower girl. After asking her questions, Sarah Smith reveals that she is a new benefactor for the hospital and that she recognises Hetty as the girl who has run away but praises her story-telling abilities. Sissy leaves and Sarah takes Hetty back to the hospital after buying her ink and a book as a treat to record her tale.

When Hetty is returned to the hospital, Ida collapses upon seeing her. Sarah Smith tells the matron that Hetty was kidnapped and there is to be no punishment, which the matron has no choice but to obey. Hetty is allowed to visit Ida in her attic room, where Ida reveals that she is Hetty's mother and has been working at the hospital to look after her. Hetty's red hair comes from her father, a sailor with whom Ida has no contact. Ida tells Hetty it must be their secret, as she will get sacked if she is found out and will no longer be able to see her. The book ends with Ida and Hetty planning a happy future together.

== Characters ==
- Hetty Feather – The main character, who has been abandoned as a baby at the Foundling Hospital. She is well known for her red hair, her fiery temper, and her imagination.
- Gideon Smeed – Another foundling fostered by Peg and John at the same time as Hetty. He is five days older than Hetty and is rather timid.
- Jem – Peg and John's seventh and youngest biological child. He takes a shine to Hetty and promises to marry her once she leaves the hospital.
- Saul – Another foundling fostered by Peg and John, some time before Hetty and Gideon, so he returns to the hospital before them. He is described as having a "withered leg", requiring a crutch, and is two years older than Hetty. He later dies of influenza in the Foundling Hospital.
- Martha – Another foundling fostered by Peg and John, some time before Hetty and Gideon, so she returns to the hospital before them. She "sings like an angel" and is very well-mannered but has poor sight and a squinting eye.
- Peg – Hetty's foster mother, who sometimes paddles Hetty for her naughty behaviour, but nonetheless adores her, along with the other young children.
- John – Hetty's foster father, who works as a farmer and is kind if domineering towards the children.
- Marcus – Peg and John's first son, and the oldest. He is in the military, and not encountered in the book.
- Bess and Nora – Peg and John's second and third biological children, and the oldest daughters. They are in service and are never really encountered in the book.
- Rosie – The fourth biological child of Peg and John.
- Big Eliza – The fifth of Peg and John's biological children. She bears the same name as the youngest foundling brought into their family. She is married to Frederick and has two boys.
- Nat – The sixth biological child of Peg and John, who teases Jem for playing 'girly' games with Hetty.
- Little Eliza – Another foundling fostered by Peg and John, after Hetty and Gideon have returned to the hospital. She is five years younger than Hetty. Hetty is appalled and hurt when she discovers that Jem had also promised Eliza that he'd marry her.
- Ida Battersea – The kind kitchen maid at the Foundling Hospital who is later revealed to be Hetty Feather's biological mother.
- Polly Renfrew – Hetty's best friend at the Foundling Hospital. She is adopted by a wealthy couple whose daughter Lucy had died of flu.
- Harriet – A kind older girl at the Foundling Hospital who takes a shine to Hetty.
- Sheila – A girl who lives in the same dormitory as Hetty, who bullies Hetty. She serves as the secondary antagonist of the story and enjoys getting Hetty into trouble.
- Monica – Sheila's best friend. She imitates Sheila but is kinder.
- Matron Bottomly -The head of the senior school in the Foundling Hospital. Hetty calls her "Matron Stinking Bottomly" behind her back. She is the main antagonist of the story and constantly bullies Hetty and gets her own way with the foundlings.
- Matron Peters -The head of the infants' school. Hetty calls her "Matron Pig-Face Peters" behind her back. However, Matron Bottomly makes her seem quite nice.
- Nurse Winterson – The kind nurse at the Foundling Hospital whom Hetty adores and calls "Nurse Winnie". Nurse Winterson was the same nurse who successfully got Hetty to feed as a newborn, when she wouldn't drink from a bottle properly.
- Madame Adeline – A circus performer with an equestrian act. Hetty believes Adeline may be her mother, but she turns out not to be.
- Sissy – A fourteen-year-old flower girl who rescues Hetty from a strange man. She lives in a small room with her sister Lil and her father, an alcoholic who spends all of Sissy's flower-selling money on drinks. In the end, she got a job as a junior teacher at Miss Smith's Home for Destitute Girls.
- Lil – Sissy's little sister who suffers from a life-threatening cough. She eventually dies, despite access to health care in her final days.
- Miss Sarah Smith – A wealthy and successful author writing Penny for a Posy, a book about young flower sellers, mainly based on Hetty and Sissy, and the newest benefactor of the Foundling Hospital. She dedicates her book to Hetty, Sissy, and the memory of Lil. She runs a home called Miss Smith's Home for Destitute Girls.

== TV adaptation ==
Hetty Feather was filmed by CBBC Productions under lead writer Helen Blakeman, and aired on British TV channel CBBC in May 2015. Film locations for the TV adaption are entirely in the county of Kent and include Cobham Hall School for girls in Cobham, Kent doubling as an orphanage, Belmont House and Gardens in Faversham doubling as Calendar Hall, Maidstone TV Studios to build various sets, including classrooms, the kitchen and a library and The Historic Dockyard Chatham which provided several locations to stand in for Victorian London including the streets around the Ropery, Tarred Yarn Store, Officer's Terrace and Admiral's Offices. Isabel Clifton starred as Hetty. Each series consists of ten 30-minute episodes and there are six series in total aired between 2015 and 2020.

== Stage adaptation ==
In 2014 Hetty Feather was adapted for the stage. The production opened at Rose Theatre, Kingston in April 2014 before embarking on a UK tour. It then transferred to the West End at the Vaudeville Theatre and opened on 5 August. It was subsequently nominated for an Olivier Award for Best Family and Entertainment Show. The show was adapted by Emma Reeves and directed by Sally Cookson with Phoebe Thomas in the title role.

=== Original cast ===
- Phoebe Thomas as Hetty Feather
- Paul Mundell as Gideon
- Isaac Stanmore as Saul
- Nikki Warwick as Madame Adeline
- Seamus H. Carey as Musician
- Luke Potter as Musician

Musician Alex Heane joined the company for the West End run.

=== 2015–2016 revival ===
A revival of the show saw another West End run at the Duke of York's Theatre in summer of 2015 followed by a 2015-16 UK tour, including a residence over Christmas at The Lowry in Manchester. In June 2016 there were performances at the Asolo Repertory Theatre in Sarasota, Florida.

The show had another revival over the Christmas season 2017–18 at the Nuffield Theatre, Southampton. The play can be seen on live streaming at BroadwayHD.
