= 1726 in literature =

This article contains information about the literary events and publications of 1726.

== Events ==
- February – Lavinia Fenton makes her stage debut as Monimia in Thomas Otway's The Orphan at the Haymarket Theatre in London.
- April 5 – Publication takes place in London of Lewis Theobald's Shakespeare Restored, or A Specimen of the Many Errors As Well Committed as Unamended by Mr Pope in his Late Edition of this Poet; Designed Not only to correct the said Edition, but to restore the True Reading of Shakespeare in all the Editions ever yet published.
- May 10 – Voltaire leaves France for a three-year stay in Britain.
- May 25 – Britain's first circulating library is opened in Edinburgh by the poet and bookseller Allan Ramsay.
- July – Françoise-Louise de Warens converts to Catholicism to receive a church pension, and annuls her marriage.
- October 28 – Jonathan Swift's satirical novel Gulliver's Travels is published in London, anonymously in two volumes, as Travels into Several Remote Nations of the World. In Four Parts. By Lemuel Gulliver, First a Surgeon, and then a Captain of Several Ships. It sells out in a week.
- unknown dates
  - The Teatro Valle opens in Rome.
  - In China, 64 copies of a 5,020-volume encyclopedia, the Complete Classics Collection of Ancient China (古今圖書集成), are printed, requiring the crafting of 250,000 movable type characters cast in bronze. The text was drafted by Chen Menglei in 1700–05 and prepared for publication by around 1725.

== New books ==
=== Fiction ===
- Penelope Aubin – The Life and Adventures of the Lady Lucy (novel)
- Jane Barker – The Lining of the Patch-Work Screen (sequel to 1723's A Patch-Work Screen)
- William Rufus Chetwood – The Voyages and Adventures of Captain Robert Boyle (fiction, sometimes attributed to Daniel Defoe)
- Eliza Haywood
  - The City Jilt
  - The Mercenary Lover
- Jonathan Swift
  - Gulliver's Travels
  - Cadenus and Vanessa

=== Drama ===
- Venkata Ajapura – Mairavana Kalaga
- Aaron Hill – The Fatal Extravagance (printed, staged in 1721)
- Charles Johnson – The Female Fortune Teller
- Thomas Southerne – Money the Mistress
- Leonard Welsted – The Dissembled Wanton
- Richard West – Hecuba

=== Poetry ===
- Alexander Pope – The Odyssey of Homer
- Richard Savage – Miscellaneous Poems
- William Somervile – Occasional Poems
- Jonathan Swift (anonymously) – Cadenus and Vanessa (written 1713)
- James Thomson – Winter (part of The Four Seasons)

=== Non-fiction ===
- John Balguy – A letter to a Deist concerning the Beauty and Excellency of Moral Virtue, and the Support and Improvement which it receives from the Christian Religion
- Joseph Butler – Fifteen Sermons
- Anthony Collins – The Scheme of Literal Prophecy
- Corporate authorship – The Craftsman (periodical associated with Henry St. John)
- Daniel Defoe
  - The Political History of the Devil
  - A System of Magick
- John Dennis – The Stage Defended (reply to Law, below)
- José Francisco de Isla – Papeles critico-apologéticos
- William Law
  - The Absolute Unlawfulness of the Stage
  - A Practical Treatise upon Christian Perfection
- Samuel Penhallow – History of the Wars of New-England with the Eastern Indians
- William Penn
  - Fruits of a Father's Love
  - A Collection of the Works of William Penn
  - (with William Pulteney) – The Discovery
- Jean-Philippe Rameau – Nouveau système de musique théorique
- Martín Sarmiento – Reflexiones sobre el Diccionario de la lengua castellana que compuso la Real Academia en el año de 1726
- George Shelvocke – A Voyage Round the World by Way of the Great South Sea
- Joseph Spence – An Essay on Popes' Odyssey
- Lewis Theobald – Shakespeare Restored
- Diego de Torres Villarroel – El ermitaño y Torres

== Births ==
- March 11 – Louise d'Épinay, French writer (died 1783)
- April 7 – Charles Burney, English historian of music and composer (died 1814)
- June 14 – Thomas Pennant, Welsh naturalist and writer (died 1798)
- September 2 – John Howard, English philanthropist and writer (died 1790)
- September 25 – Angelo Maria Bandini, Italian author and librarian (died 1800)
- September 26 – John H. D. Anderson, Scottish natural philosopher (died 1796)

== Deaths ==
- March 24 – Daniel Whitby, English theologian (born 1638)
- March 26 – Sir John Vanbrugh, English dramatist and architect (born 1664)
- April 5 – Ludwig Babenstuber, German theologian and philosopher (born 1660)
- April 26 – Jeremy Collier, English theologian and critic (born 1650)
- May 20 – Nicholas Brady, Irish poet (born 1659)
- July 5 – Domenico Viva, Italian theologian (born 1648)
- July 6 – Humfrey Wanley, English librarian and palaeographer (born 1672)
- August 12 – Charles Shadwell, English dramatist (year of birth unknown)
- December 2 – Samuel Penhallow, English historian (born 1665)
- December 11 – Jacques Bouillart, French Benedictine historian (born 1669)
