= Mere Nature Delineated =

1726 pamphlet by Daniel Defoe

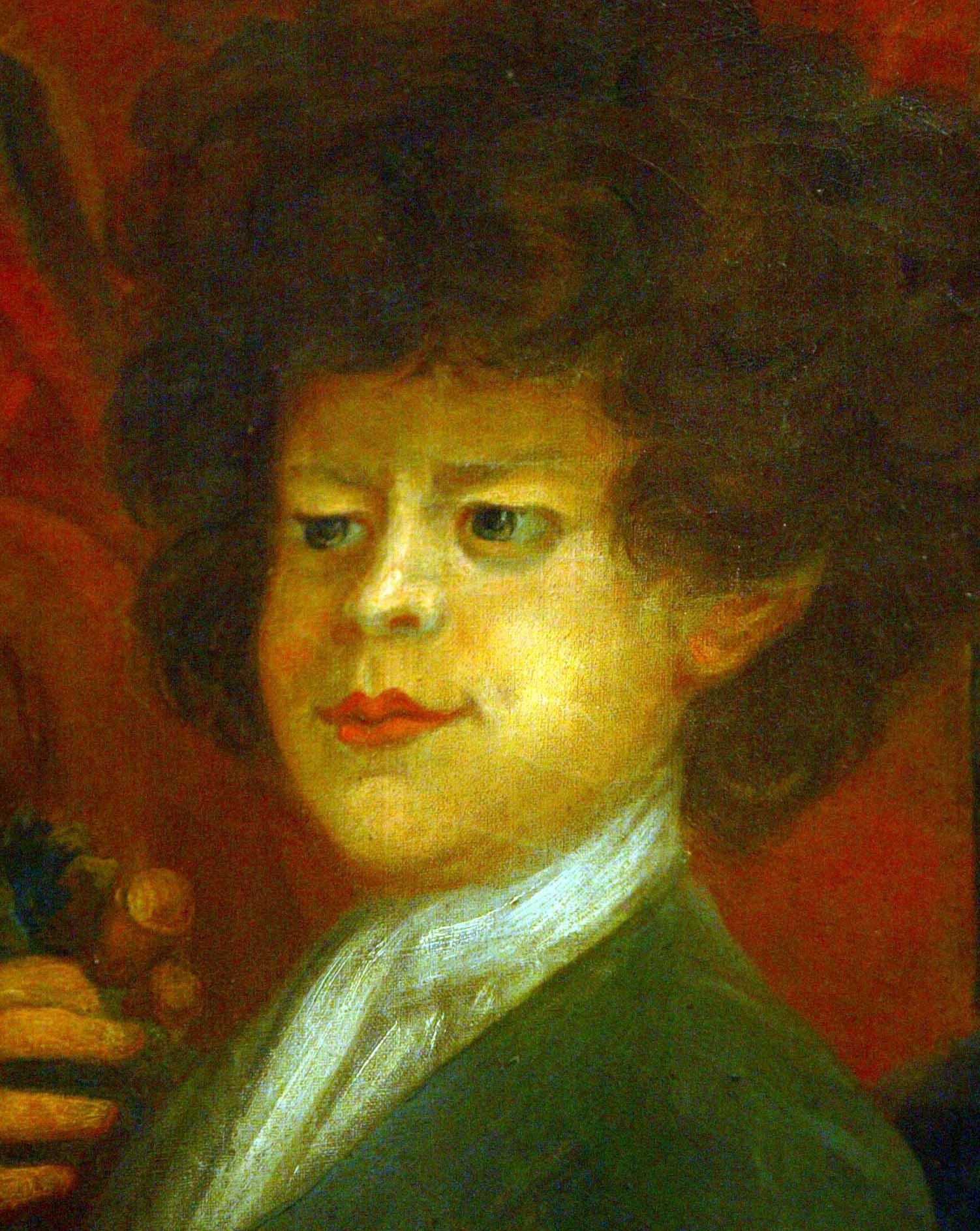
Peter the Wild Boy, the subject of Mere Nature Delineated

Mere Nature Delineated is a pamphlet by Daniel Defoe, first published in 1726. The longer title under which it was originally published is Mere nature delineated: or, A body without a soul. Being observations upon the young forester lately brought to town from Germany. With suitable applications. Also, a brief dissertation upon the usefulness and necessity of fools, whether political or natural.

The title and primary subject of the work is Peter the Wild Boy, a feral child who was brought to the court of George I in Great Britain in 1726. His uncivilized behaviour aroused considerable public interest, and Defoe was one of many writers who contributed to the debate about what the boy's condition meant for how the human subject should be considered. The pamphlet also broaches out to discuss the subject of 'fools' across Europe.

== Background ==
The title and primary subject of the work is Peter the Wild Boy, a mentally handicapped child who was found in 1725 living feral in woods near Hamelin, in the Electorate of Hanover. In spring of the following year he was brought to the court of George I in Great Britain. His uncivilized behaviour and inability to speak a language aroused considerable public interest and he was for a brief time a minor celebrity. Defoe was one of many thinkers and writers who responded to the episode, describing Peter as being "in a state of Mere Nature … a ship without a Rudder". As is the case with some of his other works from this period, Defoe's authorship of the pamphlet has been questioned; however, it is now generally considered to have been written by him.

== Contents ==
The pamphlet is composed of five parts and a conclusion: Part I of the pamphlet discusses the origins of the boy. Defoe believes his recent history—his discovery in Hamelin in the Electorate of Hanover—to be true, but raises doubts that it will ever be known how he came to be without speech or education. He then critiques the evidence—"That he can Think" and "That he can Laugh"— offered more widely for his having a Soul. Part II explores his current state of behaviour and the implications for how society can consider the human subject. Part III continues and expands on these considerations. Part IV, entitled "Of the Usefulness and Necessity of Fools in the present Age, and especially at the Courts of some Princes," departs from the subject of Peter to consider fools in Europe. Such discussion is continued in Part V, entitled "Further Conclusions upon the extraordinary Agency of Fools lately seen in some Courts of Europe, and the usual Fate of the Instruments themselves." The Conclusion returns to the subject of Peter and rebukes the suggestion that this is a "Jest upon the Youth".
