= Peter the Wild Boy =

German feral child (c.1713–1785)

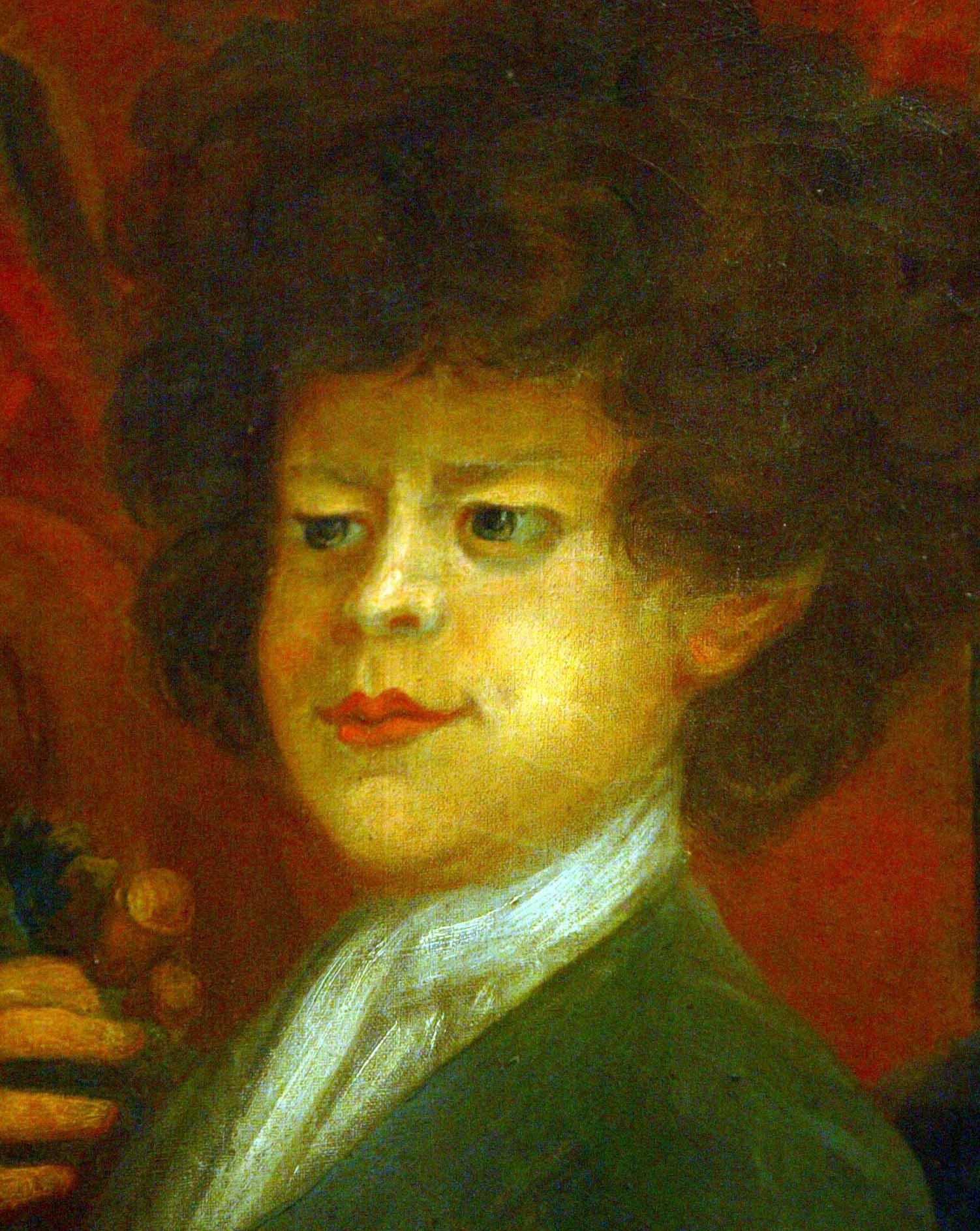
- Peter in a detail of a painting by William Kent at Kensington Palace
- Born: c. 1713; Probably somewhere in or near Hanover, Germany
- Died: February 1785 (aged 71–72); Berkhamsted, England
- Other name: Peter the Wild Man
- Known for: Feral child

Peter the Wild Boy (c. 1713 – 22 February 1785) was a German boy who was found in 1725 living wild in the woods near Hamelin. He was of unknown parentage and had been living an entirely feral existence for an unknown length of time, surviving by eating forest flora; he walked on all fours, exhibited uncivilized behaviour and could not be taught to speak a language. It has been speculated that he suffered from the very rare genetic disorder Pitt–Hopkins syndrome.

Peter was found in the Hertswold Forest by a party of hunters led by George I while on a visit to his Hanover homeland and brought to Great Britain in 1726 by order of his daughter-in-law Caroline of Ansbach, the Princess of Wales.

== Life in London ==
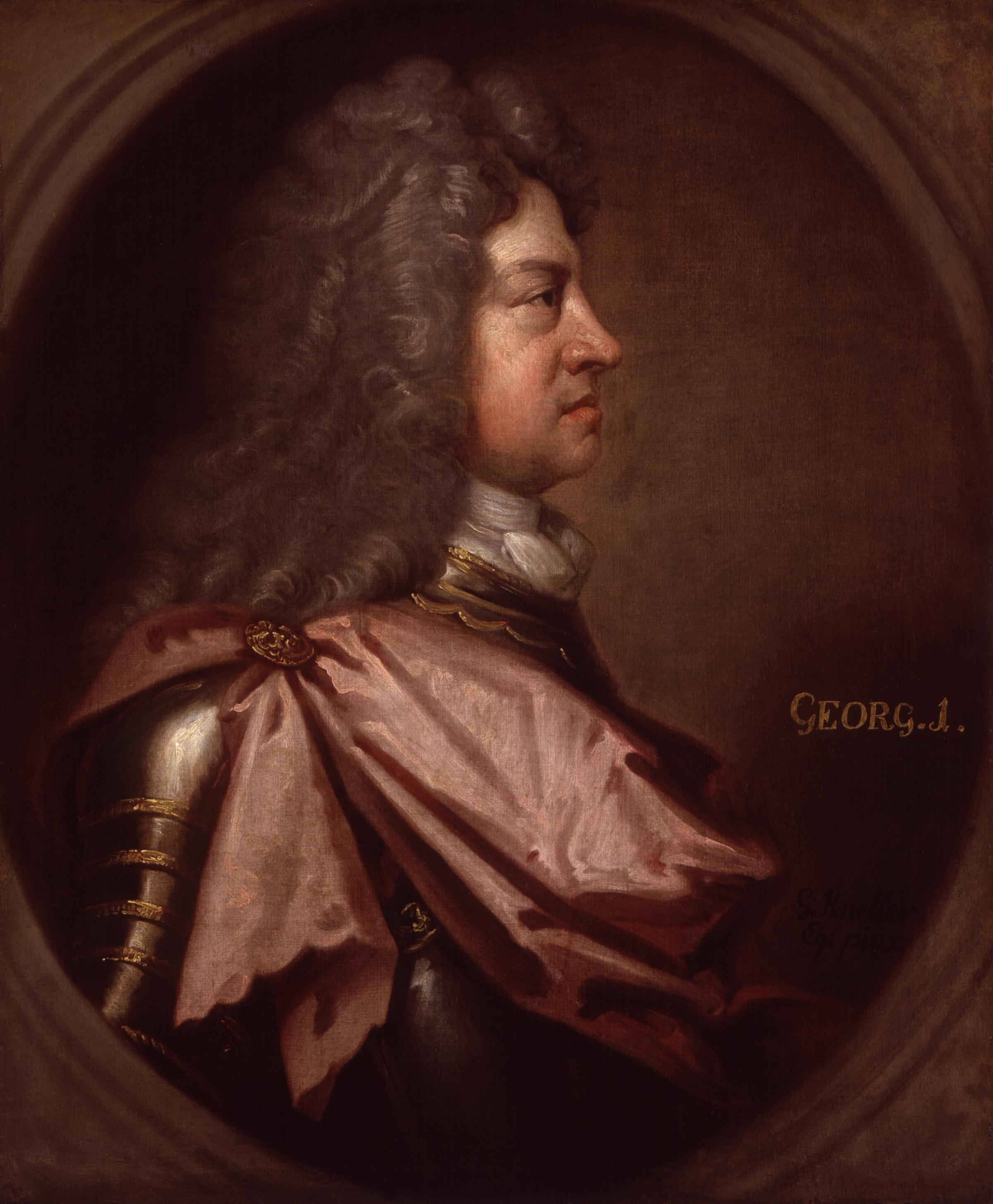
King George I

After Peter's transportation to Britain, curiosity and speculation concerning Peter was excited in London. The craze was the subject of a biting satire by Jonathan Swift, and of another entitled The Most Wonderful Wonder that ever appeared to the Wonder of the British Nation, which has been attributed to Swift and John Arbuthnot. Daniel Defoe also wrote on the subject in his pamphlet Mere Nature Delineated. Scottish philosopher and judge James Burnett, Lord Monboddo, in his Origin and Progress of Language presents Peter as an illustration of his theory of the evolution of the human species.

Caroline, Princess of Wales took an interest in Peter's welfare, and in 1726, after the initial public curiosity began to subside, she arranged for Dr Arbuthnot to oversee his education. All efforts to teach him to speak, read or write failed.

The interior designer and painter William Kent included a depiction of Peter in a large painting of King George I's court that today hangs on the east wall of the King's Staircase at Kensington Palace in London. Peter is shown wearing a green coat and holding oak leaves and acorns in his right hand.

== Life in Northchurch ==
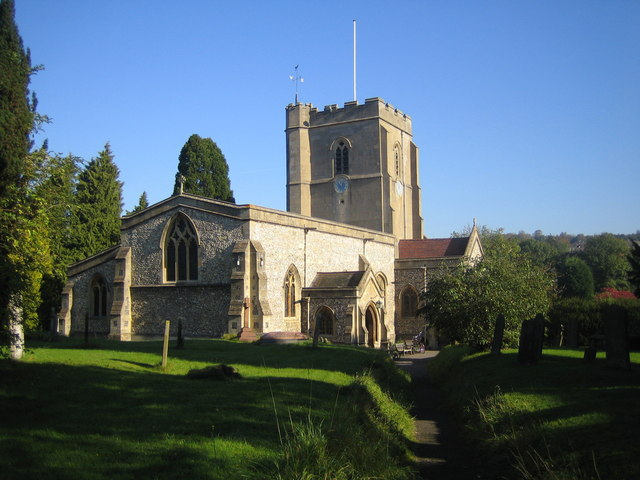
St Mary's Church, Northchurch, Hertfordshire

After Peter was discharged from the supervision of Arbuthnot, he was entrusted to the care of Mrs. Titchbourn, one of the Queen's bedchamber women, with a handsome pension annexed to the charge. Mrs. Titchbourn usually spent a few weeks every summer at the house of Mr. James Fenn, a yeoman farmer, at Axter's End, in the parish of Northchurch, Hertfordshire. Peter was left there in the care of Mr. Fenn, who was allowed £35 a year for his support and maintenance. After the death of Mr. Fenn, Peter was transferred to the care of James's brother, Thomas, at another farmhouse, called Broadway, where he lived with the several successive tenants of that farm and worked as a farmhand, sustaining on the same government pension to the time of his death.

In late summer 1751, Peter went missing from Broadway Farm and could not be traced. Advertisements were placed in newspapers offering a reward for his safe return. On 22 October 1751, a fire broke out in the parish of St Andrew's in Norwich. As the fire spread, the local gaol became engulfed in smoke and flame. The frightened inmates were hastily released and one aroused considerable curiosity on account of his remarkable appearance, excessively hirsute and strong, and the nature of the sounds he made, which led some to describe him as an orangutan. Some days later, he was identified as Peter the Wild Boy, possibly through a description of him in the London Evening Post. He was returned to Thomas Fenn's farm, and had a special leather collar with his name and address made for him to wear in future, should he ever stray again.

Peter lived to an estimated 70 years of age, having been visited in 1782 by Burnett. He was said to have a healthy complexion with a full white beard, while acquiring a taste for food beyond plants and enjoying the simple things of life. He had picked up limited speech, capable of saying his name, "King George" and humming a few songs, while understanding what Burnett had said to him, a far cry from his past feral self. There is a portrait of the "Wild Boy", depicting a handsome old man with a white beard, in Caulfield's Portraits of Remarkable Persons.

== Death and burial ==
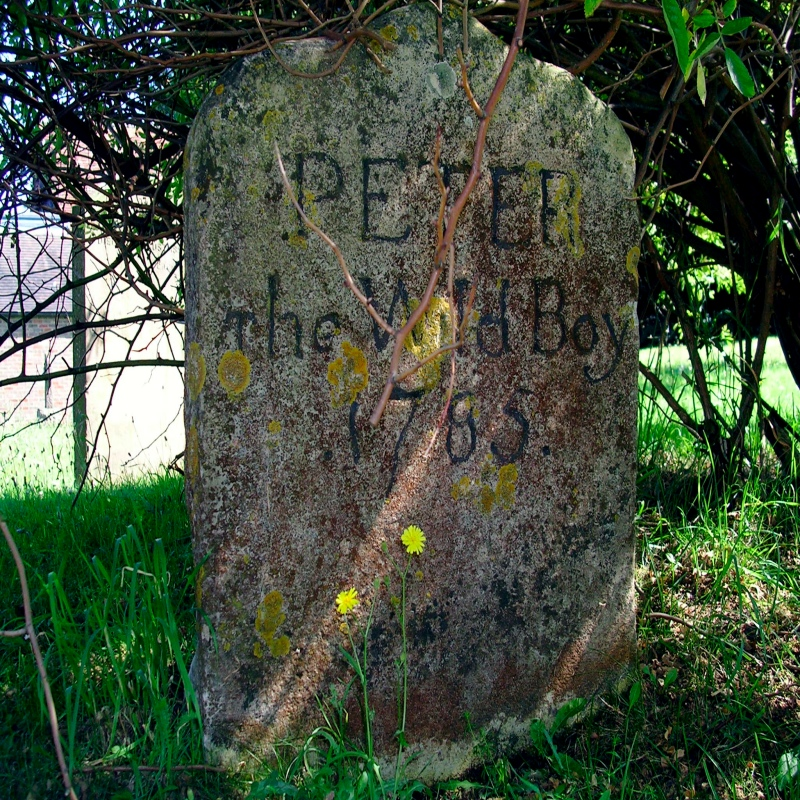
Gravestone of Peter the Wild Boy at St Mary's Church, Northchurch, Hertfordshire

Peter died on 22 February 1785 at his residence and is buried in Northchurch. His grave can still be seen in the churchyard of St Mary's Church, Northchurch, directly outside the main door to the church.

In 2007, a blue heritage plaque was placed at the Wild Man pub in Bedford Street, near St Andrew's in Norwich, commemorating Peter and his association with the district.

On 20 February 2013, it was announced by the Department for Culture, Media and Sport that the grave was to be given Grade II listing on the advice of English Heritage.

== Modern assessment ==
In 2011, the condition that afflicted Peter the Wild Boy was suspected to be the chromosomal disorder Pitt–Hopkins syndrome, a condition identified only in 1978, nearly 200 years after Peter's death. Various physical attributes of Peter's which are evident in the Kensington Palace portrait have been matched to the condition, such as his curvy "Cupid's bow" lips, his short stature, his coarse, curly hair, drooping eyelids and thick lips.

An item on the BBC Radio 4 programme Witness History broadcast in March 2011 examined the history of Peter the Wild Boy, tracing his life in Northchurch and later in Berkhamsted, where a leather and brass collar designed to identify Peter in case he should wander away from the village and inscribed "Peter the Wild Man" is preserved at Berkhamsted School.

== See also ==
- Feral child
- Wild man
- Pitt–Hopkins syndrome
- James Burnett, Lord Monboddo
