= The Apparition of Mrs. Veal =

1706 pamphlet by Daniel Defoe

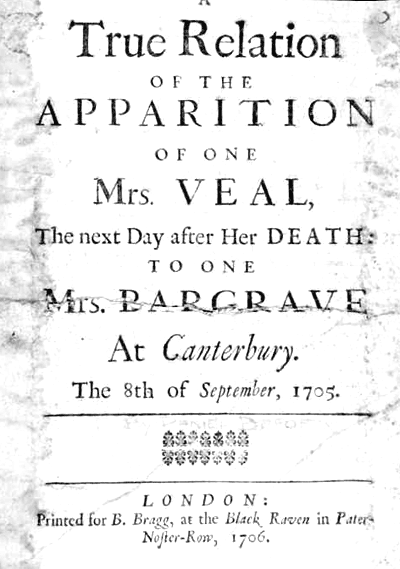
- Title page from the first edition of the pamphlet
- Author: Daniel Defoe (attributed)
- Original title: A True Relation of the Apparition of one Mrs. Veal, the next Day after her Death: to one Mrs. Bargrave at Canterbury. The 8th of September, 1705
- Language: English
- Genre: Apparition narrative
- Publisher: B. Bragg
- Publication place: United Kingdom

The Apparition of Mrs. Veal is a pamphlet that was published anonymously in 1706 and is usually attributed to Daniel Defoe. Titled in full A True Relation of the Apparition of one Mrs. Veal, the next Day after her Death: to one Mrs. Bargrave at Canterbury. The 8th of September, 1705, it has been described as "the first modern ghost story".

== Synopsis ==
The pamphlet tells the story of a Canterbury resident, Mrs. Bargrave, who is visited by Mrs. Veal, an old friend and former neighbour who says that she would like to catch up before departing for a journey. Mrs. Bargrave's kiss of greeting is declined by Mrs. Veal who protests that she is not very well. The pair discuss books on death and friendship before Mrs. Veal asks for her friend to write a letter to her brother concerning a number of gifts she would like him to make. She also discloses that her locked cabinet contains a purse filled with gold. Mrs. Bargrave admires the distinctive dress worn by Mrs. Veal. Mrs. Bargrave steps out to call her daughter, and when she returns she finds that Mrs. Veal has already left the house and is standing in the street ready to leave. Mrs. Veal says that she must be going and walks away, watched by Mrs. Bargrave until she is out of sight.

Mrs. Bargrave subsequently looks for Mrs. Veal, but is told by one of her friend's relatives that she had died the day before the visit. Mrs. Bargrave later tells her story to various interlocutors. According to the preface it is relayed to the publisher via "a gentleman, a justice of peace, at Maidstone, in Kent, and a very intelligent person, to his friend in London, as it is here worded; which discourse is attested by a very sober and understanding gentlewoman, a kinswoman of the said gentleman's, who lives in Canterbury, within a few doors of the house in which the within-named Mrs Bargrave lives".

== Themes ==
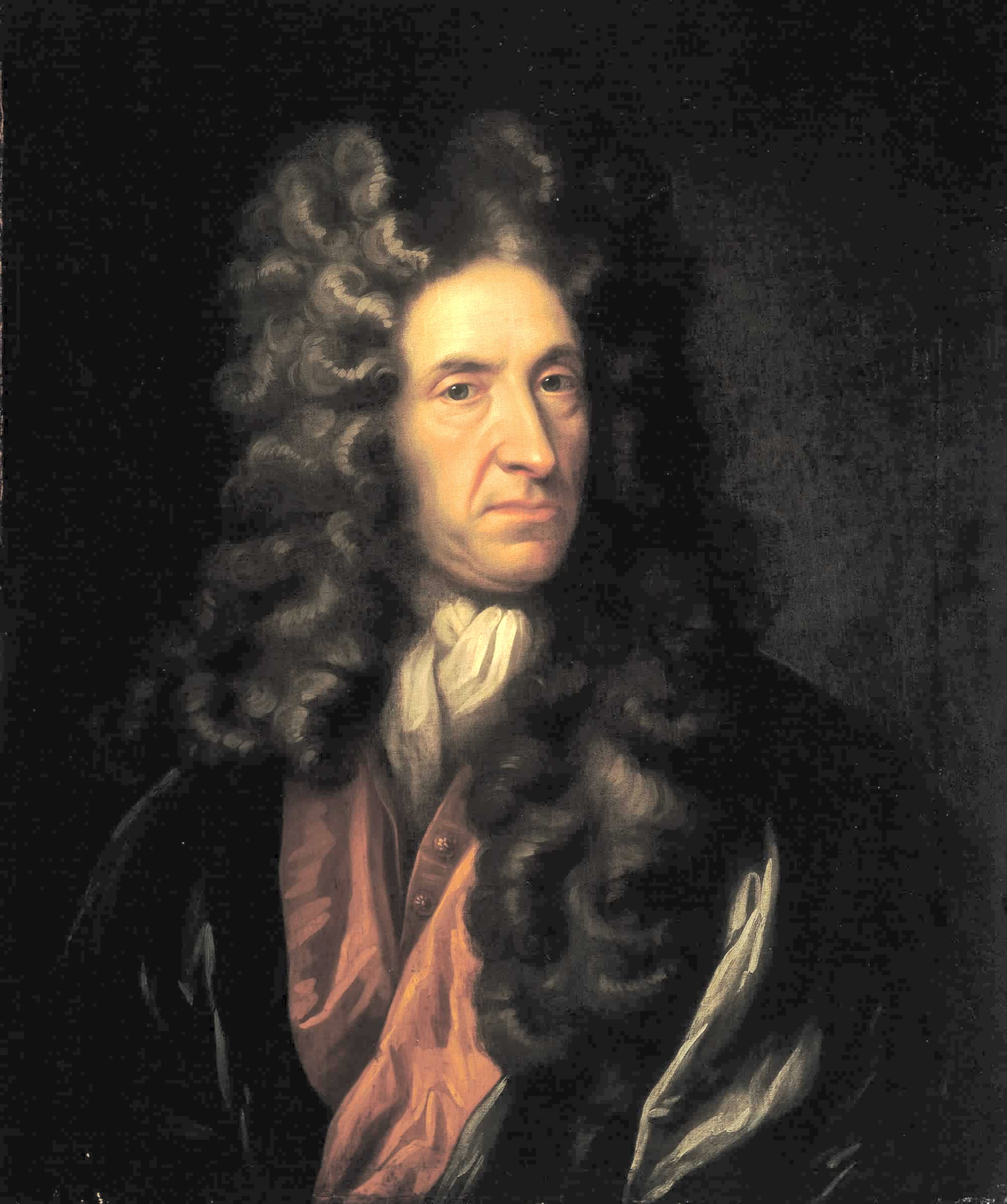
Daniel Defoe pictured in the late 17th/early 18th century

The pamphlet has often and for many years been attributed to Daniel Defoe, though this has been challenged in a 2003 paper by George Starr. Defoe had a long-standing interest in what would now be termed the supernatural and addressed the topic several times in his works. His 1720 Serious Reflections of Robinson Crusoe, the "sequel" to his much more famous 1719 novel Robinson Crusoe, described "A vision of the Angelick World", and he later wrote three works which addressed demonology: The Political History of the Devil (1726), A System of Magick (1727) and An Essay on the History and Reality of Apparitions (1727).

The Apparition of Mrs. Veal is the most famous example of a well-established genre at the time, that of the "apparition narrative", which flourished in the late 17th and early 18th centuries. The genre had similarities to later ghost stories and gothic fiction, but differed from both in its philosophical starting point. The subject of "apparitions" was not necessarily regarded as supernatural – a category that was still evolving at the time – nor were they taken to be spirits of the dead, a concept which contemporary English Protestant writers (not least Defoe himself, in his History and Reality of Apparitions) strongly rejected. They were taken to be literally "appearances" in which "a spirit may vest it self with Flesh and Blood", as Defoe put it; a form with apparently solid substance but no actual person present.

The story of the apparition of Mrs. Veal was not original to Defoe. It may have circulated as a popular tale, as did other accounts of "life after death", and at least one other early 18th-century letter addressed the story. Defoe's version is unusual, however, in that it explicitly highlights its status as a printed text. It is prefaced by an introduction from an unnamed editor that describes the purported circumstances in which the story came to be published, implicitly indicating that it passed through multiple sets of hands in manuscript before the editor arranged for it to be printed. The text of the story itself also focuses on the printed word, specifically mentioning "Drelincourt's Book of Death" and other unnamed works on death. The Apparition was in fact subsequently included with the fourth edition of the English translation of Charles Drelincourt's book, The Christian's Defence against the Fears of Death, and helped to boost its sales in many more editions published around the country. One of Defoe's earliest biographers claimed that The Apparition had been written specifically to promote Drelincourt's book in response to a complaint about its slow sales, but the veracity of this claim is unclear; as William Lee puts it, "all this is circumstantial".

The Apparition goes to some lengths to convince the reader of its authenticity – as the lengthy title illustrates, specifying names, dates and places and closing with a commentary on the veracity of the "witnesses". Although it has been described as a work of fiction and as an influence on the development of the formal story, it has rather more in common with Defoe's journalistic work than with his other works of fiction. It served a didactic purpose, like other "apparation narratives" of the time, which developed in response to a crisis in religious belief that had been provoked by the works of Thomas Hobbes and the emergence of modern materialist philosophies. Their influence was resisted by the authors of apparition narratives, who sought to convince sceptics of the existence of the afterlife and divine providence through accounts of spiritual visitations that presented a detailed and ostensibly authenticated version of the events that they described. As such, they can be seen as works of "theological propaganda", an outlook which later ghost stories, written purely for the purposes of entertainment, lacked.

== Influence ==
Although the Apparition would not have been intended as a ghost story in the modern sense, many critics nonetheless credit it as being "the first modern ghost story", albeit a "rudimentary" one. Its narrative content and structure anticipate that of later Gothic literature; authors such as Sheridan Le Fanu and Algernon Blackwood used similar devices to simulate documentary authenticity in their stories. The Apparition's ostensibly painstaking efforts to record the testimony of the "witnesses" and specify where and when the events happened can also be seen as anticipating the efforts of the Society for Psychical Research, which sought to document supernatural events in its non-fictional Transactions. A rather less orthodox interpretation of the Apparition has been proposed by Terry Castle, who argues in her book The Apparitional Lesbian that Defoe's pamphlet was "that first (and strangest) of lesbian love stories" in which Mrs. Bargrave is an unhappily married wife who receives her long-estranged friend's kisses and caresses and then goes in search of her.
