= List of authors and works on the Index Librorum Prohibitorum =

This is a selected list of authors and works listed on the Index Librorum Prohibitorum. The Index was discontinued on 14 June 1966 by Pope Saint Paul VI.

A complete list of the authors and writings present in the subsequent editions of the index are listed in J. Martinez de Bujanda, Index Librorum Prohibitorum, 1600–1966, Geneva, 2002.

The Index includes entries for single or multiple works by an author, all works by an author in a given genre or dealing with a given topic. The scope of the prohibition is defined by a Latin phrase in the Index:

- Omnia opera dramatica: all plays
- Omnes fabulae amatoriae: all novels, or romances
- Opera omnia theologica: all theological works
- Opera omnia: all works (see note below)

The Index includes entries banning all works of a particular writer. Most of these were inserted in the Index at a time when the Index itself stated that the prohibition of someone's "opera omnia" (all his works) did not cover works whose contents did not concern religion and were not forbidden by the general rules of the Index, but this explanation was omitted in the 1929 edition, an omission that was officially interpreted in 1940 as meaning that thenceforth "opera omnia" covered all the author's works without exception.

== List of authors and works in the final edition, with later additions ==
This is a selected list of the authors and works appearing in the final published edition of the Index in 1948, with later additions until the Index was discontinued in 1966.

When banned	Author	Works	Ref.
1559	Machiavelli, Niccolo	All works	(Note: Machiavelli's Prince: A New Reading, Erica Benner, pg. xx)
1600	Bruno, Giordano	All works	(Note: Beacon for Freedom of Expression entry for Bruno)
1627	Thadeus, Jan	Conciliatorium Biblicum	
1626, 1657, 1658, 1659, 1672	Grotius, Hugo	All works of theology; De Imperio summarum potestatum circa sacra (pub. 1647); Annales et historiae de rebus belgicis (pub. 1657); +6 more	(Note: Beacon for Freedom of Expression search for Grotius)
1645	Browne, Thomas	Religio Medici; the religion of a physician	(Note: Beacon for Freedom of Expression entry for Browne)
1649	Hobbes, Thomas	All works	(Note: Beacon for Freedom of Expression entry for Hobbes)
1657, 1789	Pascal, Blaise	Lettres provinciales (1657); Pensées (pub. 1670), with notes by Voltaire	(Note: Beacon for Freedom of Expression search for Pascal)
1659	Kahl, Johann	Judicial lexicon of imperial and canon law	(Note: Beacon for Freedom of Expression entry for Calvin)
1663	Descartes, René	Meditations (1641); Les passions de l'âme (1649); Opera philosophica. Donec corrig.; +4 more	(Note: Beacon for Freedom of Expression search for Descartes)
1667	Leti, Gregorio	All works	(Note: Beacon for Freedom of Expression search for Leti)
1668	Bacon, Francis (Baco, Franciscus)	De dignitate et augmentis scientiarum libri IX. Donec corrig.	(Note: Beacon for Freedom of Expression entry for Baco)
1676	Montaigne, Michel de	Essays	(Note: Beacon for Freedom of Expression entry for Montaigne)
1679, 1690	Spinoza, Baruch	Tractatus Theologico-Politicus (1677); Posthumous works	(Note: Beacon for Freedom of Expression search for Spinoza)
1684	Eriugena, Johannes Scotus (Erigena, Ioannes Scotus)	De divisione naturae libri quinque diu desiderati	(Note: Beacon for Freedom of Expression entry for Erigena)
1689, 1707, 1712	Malebranche, Nicolas	Traité de la nature et de la grace (1680); Traité de morale (1684); +4 more	(Note: Beacon for Freedom of Expression search for Malebranche)
1694, 1758	Milton, John	Literae pseudo-senatus anglicani, Cromwellii reliquorumque perduellium nomine ac iussu conscriptae (1676); Paradise Lost (1667)	(Note: Beacon for Freedom of Expression search for Milton)
1703	La Fontaine, Jean de	Contes et Nouvelles	(Note: Beacon for Freedom of Expression entry for Fontaine)
1717	Maimonides	'Tractate on Idolatry from the Mishneh Torah with notes by Dionysius Vossius'	(Note: Beacon for Freedom of Expression entry for Maimonides)
1729	Addison, Joseph	Remarks on Several Parts of Italy (1705; revised 1718)	(Note: Beacon for Freedom of Expression entry for Addison)
1734, 1737	Locke, John	An Essay Concerning Human Understanding (1689); The Reasonableness of Christianity, as Delivered in the Scriptures (1695)	(Note: Beacon for Freedom of Expression search for Locke)
1738	Swedenborg, Emanuel	Principia (1734)	(Note: Beacon for Freedom of Expression entry for Swedenborg)
1742	Berkeley, George	Alciphron, or The Minute Philosopher	(Note: Beacon for Freedom of Expression entry for Berkeley)
1743	Defoe, Daniel	The Political History of the Devil (1726)	(Note: Beacon for Freedom of Expression entry for Defoe)
1744	Richardson, Samuel	Pamela, or Virtue Rewarded (1740)	(Note: Beacon for Freedom of Expression entry for Richardson)
1751, 1762	Montesquieu	Lettres Persanes (1721); De l'esprit des lois (1748)	(Note: Beacon for Freedom of Expression search for Montesquieu)
1752, 1753, 1757, 1761, 1762, 1765, 1766, 1768, 1769, 1771, 1773, 1776, 1779	Voltaire	Candide (1759); Traité sur la tolérance (1763); Lettres philosophiques (1733; revised 1778); +38 more	(Note: Beacon for Freedom of Expression search for Voltaire)
1758, 1804	Diderot, Denis	Encyclopédie, ou dictionnaire raisonné des sciences, des arts et des métiers (1751–72); Jacques le fataliste et son maître (pub. 1796)	(Note: Beacon for Freedom of Expression search for Diderot)
1758	d'Alembert, Jean le Rond	Encyclopédie, ou dictionnaire raisonné des sciences, des arts et des métiers (1751–72)	(Note: Beacon for Freedom of Expression search for Alembert)
1759, 1774	Helvétius, Claude Adrien	De l'Esprit (1758); De l'homme, de ses facultés intellectuelles et de son éducation	(Note: Beacon for Freedom of Expression search for Helvetius)
1761	Hume, David	All works	(Note: Beacon for Freedom of Expression entry for Hume)
1762, 1766, 1806	Rousseau, Jean-Jacques	Émile, ou de l'éducation (1762); Du contrat social (1762); Julie, ou la nouvelle Héloïse (1761)	(Note: Beacon for Freedom of Expression search for Rousseau)
1764	Kollár, Adam František (Kollarius, Adamus Franciscus)	De originibus et usu perpetuo potestatis legislatoriae circa sacra apostolicorum regum Ungariae (1764)	(Note: Beacon for Freedom of Expression entry for Kollarius)
1766	Beccaria, Cesare	Dei Delitti e delle pene (1764)	
1783	Gibbon, Edward	Decline and Fall of the Roman Empire (1776–1788)	(Note: Beacon for Freedom of Expression entry for Gibbon)
1815, 1840, 1859, 1863, 1866, 1896	Michelet, Jules	6 titles	(Note: Beacon for Freedom of Expression search for Michelet)
1817	Darwin, Erasmus	Zoonomia; or The Laws of Organic Life (1794)	(Note: Beacon for Freedom of Expression entry for Darwin)
1819	Sterne, Laurence	A Sentimental Journey Through France and Italy (1768)	(Note: Beacon for Freedom of Expression entry for Sterne)
1827	Condorcet, Nicholas de	Sketch for a Historical Picture of the Progress of the Human Mind (1794)	(Note: Beacon for Freedom of Expression entry for Condorcet)
1827	Kant, Immanuel	Critique of Pure Reason (1781; revised 1787)	(Note: Beacon for Freedom of Expression entry for Kant)
1828	Stendhal	All love stories	(Note: Beacon for Freedom of Expression entry for Stendhal)
1834, 1837, 1838, 1841, 1843, 1846	Lamennais, Hugues Felicité Robert de	7 works	(Note: Beacon for Freedom of Expression search for Lamennais)
1834	Casanova, Giacomo	Mémoires	(Note: Beacon for Freedom of Expression entry for Casanova)
1835	Bentham, Jeremy	Deontology, or The science of morality (1834); +3 more	(Note: Beacon for Freedom of Expression search for Bentham)
1836	Heine, Heinrich	Reisebilder; De l'Allemagne; De la France	(Note: Beacon for Freedom of Expression search for Heine)
1840	Sand, George	All love stories	(Note: Beacon for Freedom of Expression entry for Sand)
1841	Balzac, Honoré de	All love stories	(Note: Beacon for Freedom of Expression search for Balzac)
1849	Gioberti, Vincenzo	All works	(Note: Beacon for Freedom of Expression entry for Gioberti)
1852	Proudhon, Pierre-Joseph	All works	(Note: Beacon for Freedom of Expression entry for Proudhon)
1856	Mill, John Stuart	Principles of Political Economy (1848)	(Note: Beacon for Freedom of Expression entry for John Stuart Mill)
1859, 1860, 1863, 1866, 1869, 1877, 1881, 1882, 1884, 1891, 1892	Renan, Ernest	19 titles	(Note: Beacon for Freedom of Expression search for Renan)
1863, 1880	Dumas, Alexandre (fils)	All love stories; La question du divorce	(Note: Beacon for Freedom of Expression search for Dumas)
1863	Dumas, Alexandre (père)	All love stories	(Note: Beacon for Freedom of Expression entry for Dumas)
1864	Comte, Auguste	Cours de philosophie positive	(Note: Beacon for Freedom of Expression entry for Comte)
1864	Flaubert, Gustave	Madame Bovary (1856); Salammbô (1862)	(Note: Beacon for Freedom of Expression search for Flaubert)
1873	Larousse, Pierre	Grand dictionnaire universel du XIXe siècle (1866–76)	(Note: Beacon for Freedom of Expression entry for Larousse)
1876	Draper, John William	History of the Conflict between Religion and Science (1874)	(Note: Beacon for Freedom of Expression entry for Draper)
1894	Zola, Émile	All works	(Note: Beacon for Freedom of Expression search for Zola)
1911, 1928, 1935, 1939	D'Annunzio, Gabriele	All plays; All love stories; +3 more	(Note: Beacon for Freedom of Expression search for D'Annunzio)
1912	Duchesne, Louis	Histoire ancienne de l'Eglise	(Note: Beacon for Freedom of Expression entry for Histoire ancienne de l'Eglise)
1913	Various contributors	Annales de philosophie chrétienne	(Note: Beacon for Freedom of Expression entry for Annales de philosophie chrétienne)
1914	Bergson, Henri	Essai sur les données immédiates de la conscience; Matière et mémoire; essai sur la relation du corps à l'esprit; L'évolution créatrice	(Note: Beacon for Freedom of Expression search for Bergson)
1914	Maeterlinck, Maurice	All works	(Note: Beacon for Freedom of Expression entry for Materlinck)
1922	France, Anatole	All works	(Note: Beacon for Freedom of Expression entry for France)
1931	van de Velde, Theodoor Hendrik	Het volkomen huwelijk (1926)	(Note: Beacon for Freedom of Expression entry for Van de Velde)
1934, 1935	Rosenberg, Alfred	The Myth of the Twentieth Century (1934); On the Dark Men of Our Times (1935)	(Note: Beacon for Freedom of Expression entry for Rosenberg)
1938	Loisy, Afred	All works	(Note: Beacon for Freedom of Expression entry for Loisy)
1948	Sartre, Jean-Paul	All works	
1952	Gide, André	All works	
1952	Moravia, Alberto	All works	
1953	Kazantzakis, Nikos	The Last Temptation of Christ (1955)	
1956	de Beauvoir, Simone	The Second Sex (1949); The Mandarins (1954)	

== Reversals and non-inclusions ==
There have been cases of reversal with respect to works that were on the Index, such as those of Nicolaus Copernicus and Galileo Galilei. The Inquisition's ban on reprinting Galileo's works was lifted in 1718 when permission was granted to publish an edition of his works (excluding the condemned Dialogue) in Florence. In 1741 Pope Benedict XIV authorised the publication of an edition of Galileo's complete scientific works which included a mildly censored version of the Dialogue. In 1758 the general prohibition against works advocating heliocentrism was removed from the Index of prohibited books, although the specific ban on uncensored versions of the Dialogue and Copernicus's De Revolutionibus remained. All traces of official opposition to heliocentrism by the church disappeared in 1835 when these works were dropped from the Index.

Not on the Index were Aristophanes, Juvenal, John Cleland, James Joyce and D. H. Lawrence. According to Wallace et al., this was because the primary criteria for banning a work were anticlericalism, blasphemy, and heresy.

Some authors whose views are generally unacceptable to the Church (e.g. Karl Marx) were never put on the Index; nor was Charles Darwin (see Evolution and the Roman Catholic Church).

Works that were included in the Index, and later removed, include:

When banned	Author	Works	Ref.
1585 to 1881	Dante Alighieri	De Monarchia (1312–13?)	
1616 to 1835	Nicolaus Copernicus	De revolutionibus orbium coelestium (1543)	
To 1835	Johannes Kepler	Astronomia nova (1609); Harmonices Mundi (1619); Epitome Astronomiae Copernicanae (1617–21)	
	Marquis de Sade	Justine (1791); Juliette (1797–1801)	
	Madame de Staël	Corinne ou l'Italie (1807)	
Until 1959	Victor Hugo	Notre Dame de Paris (1831); Les Misérables (1862)	

- Libri Carolini, supposedly by Charlemagne
- Rabelais
- Allan Kardec (The Spirits Book)

== Sources ==
- Coyne, George V. (2005). The Church's Most Recent Attempt to Dispel the Galileo Myth. In McMullin. pp. 340–359.
- Heilbron, John L. (2005). Censorship of Astronomy in Italy after Galileo. In McMullin. pp. 279–322.
- McMullin, Ernan, ed. (2005). The Church and Galileo. Notre Dame, In: University of Notre Dame Press. ISBN 0-268-03483-4.
