= Conjugal Lewdness =

1727 essay by Daniel Defoe

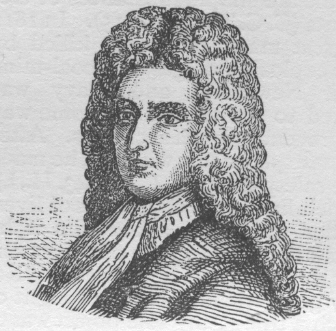
Daniel Defoe

"Conjugal Lewdness or, Matrimonial Whoredom" (later retitled "A Treatise Concerning the Use and Abuse of the Marriage Bed" for propriety) is a 1727 essay by Daniel Defoe.

The essay dealt primarily with contraception, comparing it directly with infanticide. Defoe accomplished this through anecdotes, such as a conversation between two women in which the right-minded chides the other for asking for "recipes" that might prevent pregnancy. In the essay, he further referred to contraception as "the diabolical practice of attempting to prevent childbearing by physical preparations."

George Washington is known to have owned the book, as noted in the biography by Chernow.

== First edition ==
- A treatise concerning the use and abuse of the marriage bed: shewing I. The nature of matrimony, its sacred original, and the true meaning of its institution. II. The gross abuse of matrimonial chastity, from the wrong notions which have possessed the world, degenerating even to whoredom. III. The diabolical practice of attempting to prevent child-bearing by physical preparations. ... VI. How married persons may be guilty of conjugal lewdness, and that a man may, in effect, make a whore of his own wife. Also, many other particulars of family concern. London: Printed for T. Warner, at the Black Boy in Pater-Noster-Row. 1727. OCLC 85878508, 1485508761 – via Internet Archive.
