= Laurent Drelincourt =

Laurent Drelincourt (1626–1681) was son of the French Reformed Church theologian Charles Drelincourt (1595–1669), who was a French Protestant divine. Laurent also was a theologian, who later became a pastor, and was the author of Sonnets chrétiens sur divers sujets (1677).

His orientation is said to have followed largely the teachings of John Calvin. Historically noteworthy are his poems to the Virgin Mary in Livre III. Drelincourt expresses in rich poetic language a clear theology on Mary, quoting at the end of each poem biblical sources as proof of his writings. Drelincourt expresses a Marian devotion within the Reformed movement, which was lost in later years.

Drelincourt wrote, that Christ by becoming human through the Virgin Mary did not lose who he was, but began to be what he was not. He approvingly noted that the Council of Ephesus excluded all who did not accept the Theotokos definition. He quoted Augustine, saying that Jesus selected Mary as his mother, but she was more content to conceive him in her heart than in her body. He supported Bernard of Clairvaux, when he defined Mary as a mythical paradise, which generated the tree of life for all humanity.

== Publications ==
- H Chavannes, Reformierte Theologie in Marienlexikon, Regensburg, 1988 (quoted as Chavannes)
- Jaroslav Pelikan, Mary Through The Ages, New Haven: Yale University Press, 1996, referencing Walter Tappolet, ed., Das Marienlob der Reformatoren Tübingen: Katzman Verlag, 1962
