= The Shortest Way with the Dissenters =

1702 political pamphlet by Daniel Defoe

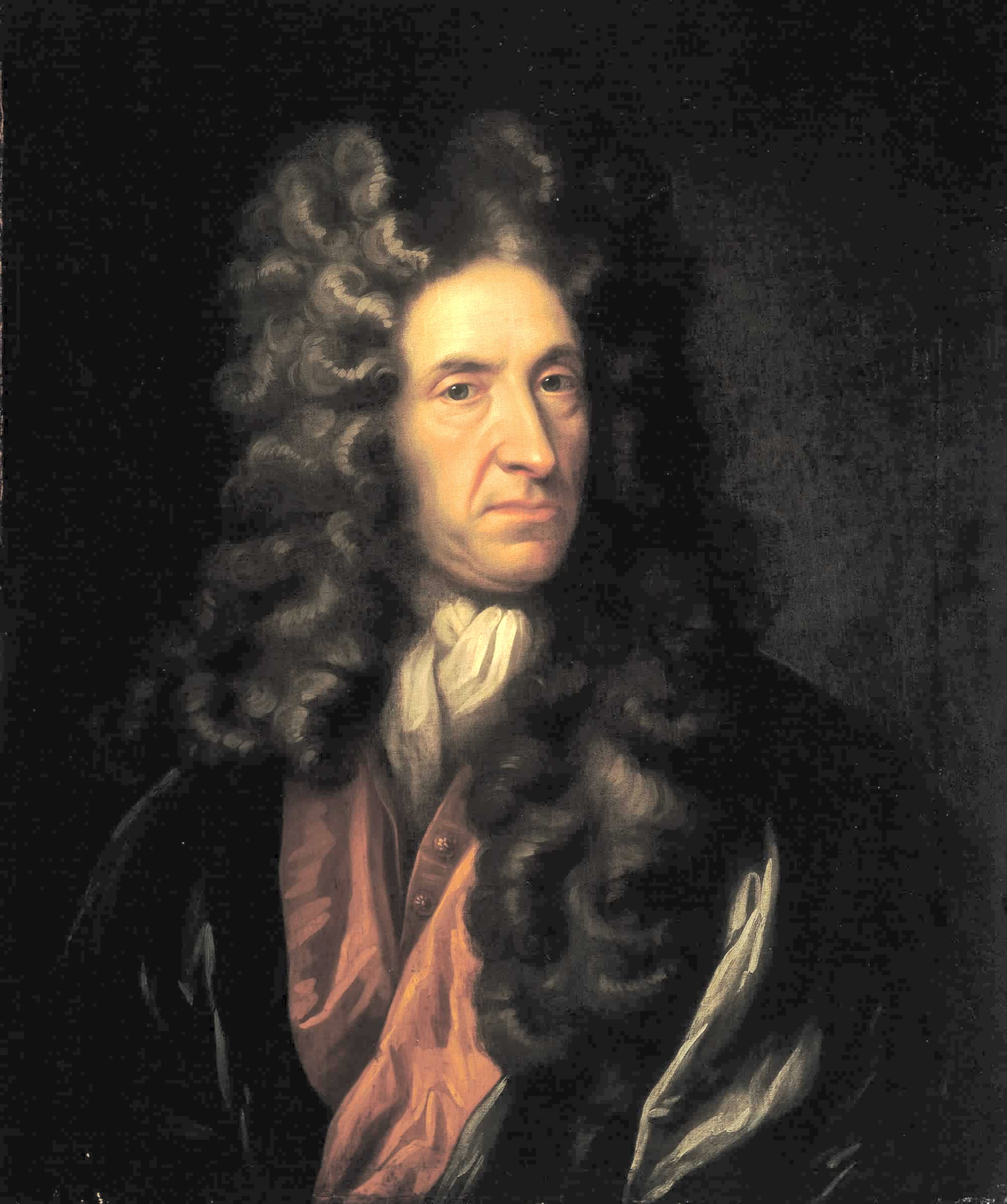
Daniel Defoe, author of The Shortest Way

The Shortest Way with the Dissenters; Or, Proposals for the Establishment of the Church is a pamphlet written by Daniel Defoe, first published anonymously in 1702. Defoe was prompted to write the pamphlet by the increased hostility towards Dissenters in the wake of the accession of Queen Anne to the throne.

The pamphlet is written in the same style as the Tory publications that attacked Dissenters, and at the time of publication it was assumed by some to be a genuine vindication of their views. However, others believed the pamphlet to have been satire—a view that is shared by modern scholars. The pamphlet raised embarrassing questions about the handling of the issue by the Tory ministry, and led to Defoe's arrest for seditious libel. His imprisonment, during which he fell into bankruptcy, was to have a lasting influence on his subsequent writings. In the years after his release, Defoe published several pamphlets that attempted to explain its purpose and his own views.

== Background ==
In 1702, King William III died, and Queen Anne succeeded to the thrones of England, Scotland and Ireland. She was markedly less tolerant than William of the device known as "occasional conformity", whereby Dissenters could qualify as members of the Church of England—and thereby hold public office—by attending a church service once a year. Defoe was supportive of religious freedom, though he was critical of the device and considered it hypocrisy. He had written against it in a pamphlet entitled An enquiry into occasional conformity: Shewing that the dissenters are no way concern'd in it (1698).

In the same year, hostility towards Dissenters increased. A bill against occasional conformity was passed through the House of Commons and debated in the Lords. Figures such as Henry Sacheverell, a high church clergyman, warned against Dissenters assuming positions of political power. His lead was followed by the Tory press, who published a number of sermons and pamphlets making similar arguments. In December, Defoe published his own pamphlet, The Shortest Way, assuming the same stylistic conventions as the Sacheverell and the Tory publications.

== Synopsis ==
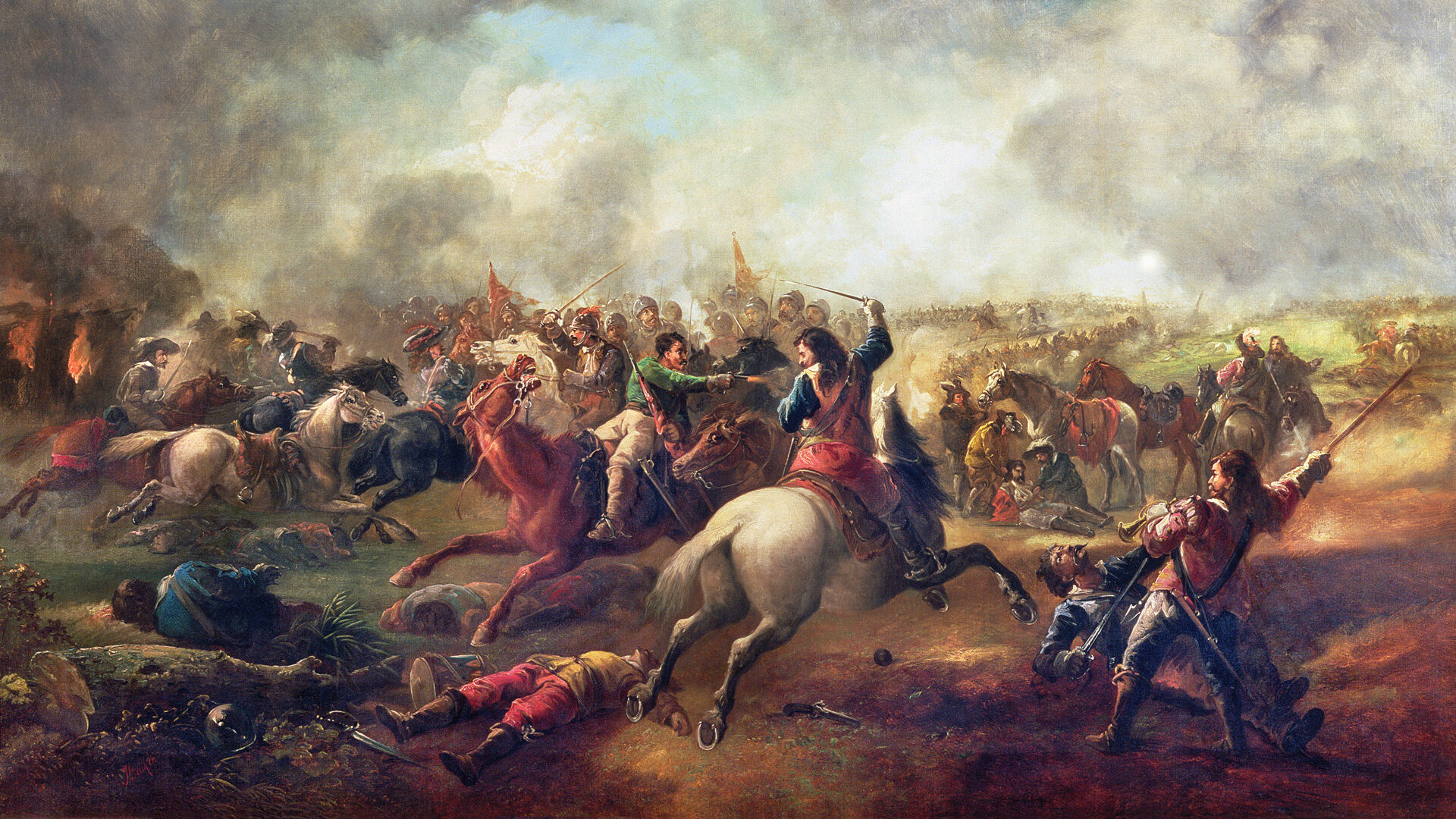
The English Civil War is one of the events the Dissenters were accused of being culpable in.

The Shortest Way with the Dissenters; or, Proposals for the Establishment of the Church is a pamphlet consisting of twenty-nine pages. It opens with the fable of the Cock and the Horses. The Cock, lacking any perch in the stable, is forced to rest on the ground and in fear of the Horses moving around and stepping on him, advises: "Pray, Gentlefolks! let us stand still! for fear we should tread upon one another!” The speaker then applies this to the contemporary situation, with the Cock representing the Dissenters.

The next section accuses the Dissenters of involvement with various notorious and hideous events of the past century, including the English Civil War and Monmouth's Rebellion. The accusations become increasingly sinister, and at points the speaker directly addresses the Dissenters ("You have butchered one King! deposed another King! and made a Mock King of a third!"). A brief history is given of how past monarchs—from James I to William III—have treated the Dissenters; in the opinion of the speaker, it is too leniently.

The major section comprises a series of arguments for why the Dissenters should be treated favourably ("They are very numerous", "That this is a time of war"). The speaker denounces each in turn and offers several counter-arguments, each gradually escalating in their severity. A vision is given of what will happen to the Church of England if it is not defended against the Dissenters. The pamphlet ends with a rallying call to action against the Dissenters in defence of the church ("Now let us crucify the Thieves.")

== Genre and style ==
The Shortest Way has traditionally been classified as a satire, although this has been disputed by scholars. Miriam Laurenbaum has suggested that it is instead a form of hoax or "banter", and that Defoe does not use many of the features necessary for it to be considered a true satire. Paul Alkon describes the critical tradition surrounding the work as "asking mainly whether it is inadequate irony, deficient satire, or misused impersonation." Ashley Marshall suggests that "The Shortest-Way is best understood not as insufficiently ironic but as a counterfeit, an intentional fake not meant to be decoded."

The difficulty for Defoe's contemporaries in assessing whether the work was ironic was the proximity of the speaker's voice to that of the High Anglicans whose views are being ridiculed. The pamphlet mixes both real observation and fabrication, and assumes the rhetorical style of his target. Defoe uses and imitates the language and metaphor of fanatical churchmen, particularly Sacheverell's sermons; the speaker's comparison of the Dissenters to vipers is one that Sacheverell often made. Although The Shortest Way does not parody the genre of the Anglican sermon, it does deploy some of the same structures; the initial Aesopic fable of the Cock and the Horses is expanded upon in a way that parallels the use of a biblical quotation to initiate a sermon.

== Reception and legacy ==
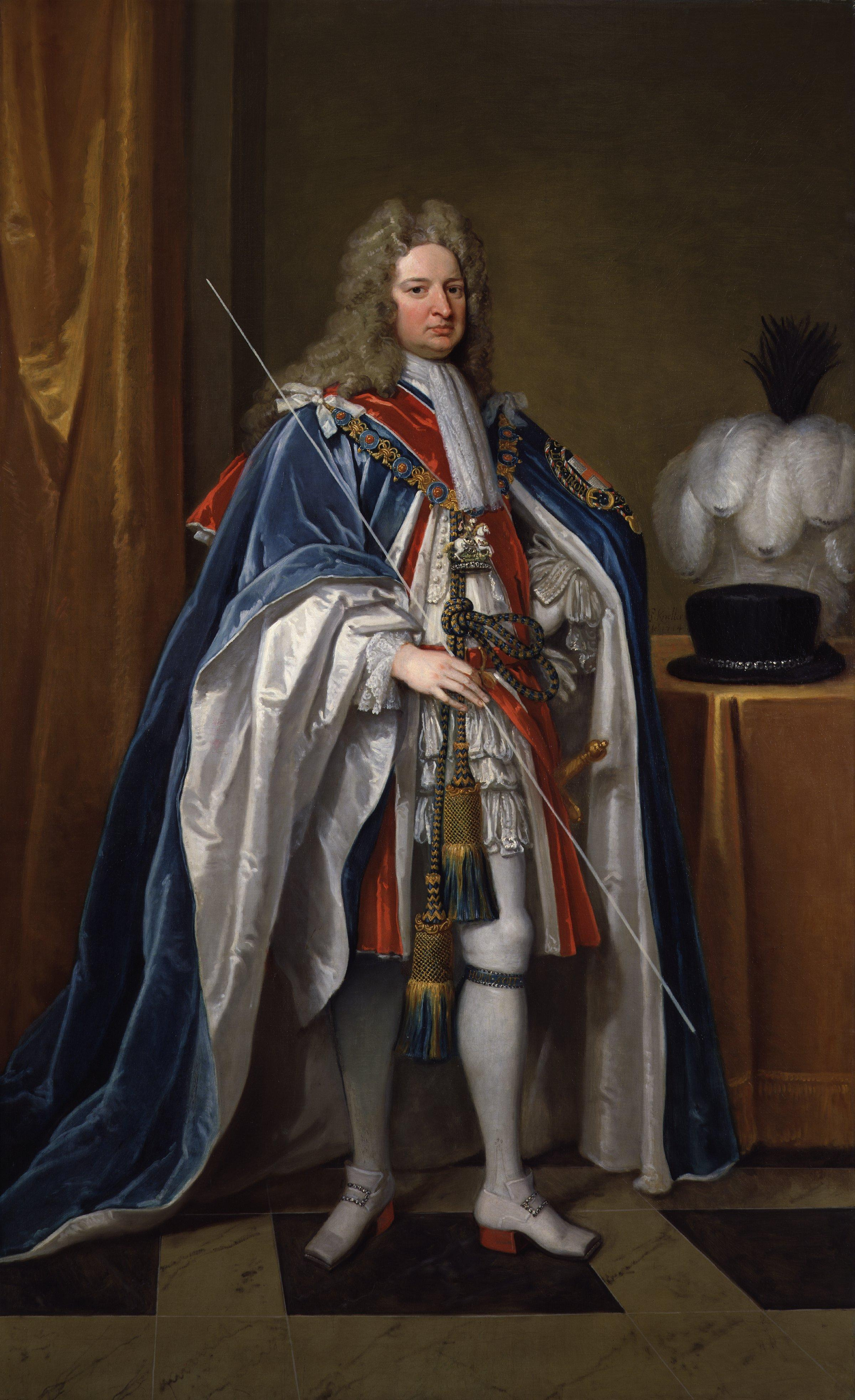
Robert Harley, leader of the Tory ministry and suspected of having obtained Defoe's release from prison

Upon its publication, The Shortest Way provoked immediate and passionate reactions from both sides of the debate. Some made use of it as a genuine vindication of the anti-Dissenter opinion, although speculation later occurred over whether it was ironic. The pamphlet generated a great deal of publicity over the handling of the issue by the Tory ministry. This resulted in the issuing of a warrant by the High Tory Secretary of State for the Southern Department, the Earl of Nottingham, for the arrest of Defoe on the charge of seditious libel, the order being given to "… make Strict and diligent Search for Daniel Fooe and him having found you are to apprehend and seize together with his Papers for high Crime and misdemeanours and to bring him before me …"

Defoe was finally imprisoned on 21 May 1703, after avoiding his summons and evading capture. He was fined, made to stand in the pillory on three occasions and remained in prison until November; in the meantime, his business affairs sank into ruin. The whole affair left a lasting impression on him, which can be felt in his writings. In the years following his arrest and release, Defoe made several attempts to explain The Shortest Way and his own viewpoint. Amongst the series of explanatory pamphlets doing this are An Explanation of a Late Pamphlet, Entituled, The Shortest Way… (1703) and A Dialogue Between a Dissenter and the Observator (1703). The suspected involvement of the Tory Speaker of the House, Robert Harley, in obtaining the release of Defoe is credited as the beginning of their professional relationship, in which Defoe worked as a propagandist for Harley, after he succeeded Nottingham as Secretary of State in 1704.

Modern scholarly reception has considered The Shortest Way in negative terms, as a failed satire, or as using irony so slight as to be undetectable. Alternately, the anonymous pamphlet may have been a counterfeit intended to be believed under the assumption that the true author would not be discovered. Such a conclusion cites the contemporary reaction to the work, how it failed to deliver its objectives and also caused its author such problems. If critics have offered praise, it is the extent to which Defoe managed to impersonate the style of his subjects, so as to be indistinguishable from them. The Shortest Way is frequently contrasted with another work of irony in the eighteenth century, which is considered to have succeeded in its use of the device, Jonathan Swift's A Modest Proposal (1729).
