= Captain Singleton =

1720 novel by Daniel Defoe

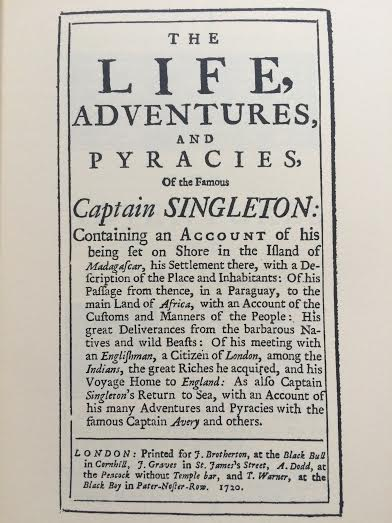
- Title page from a 1972 reprint
- Author: Daniel Defoe
- Language: English
- Publication date: 1720
- Publication place: London, England

The Life, Adventures and Piracies of the Famous Captain Singleton is a novel by Daniel Defoe, originally published in 1720. It has been re-published multiple times since, some of which times were in 1840 1927, 1972 and 2008. Captain Singleton is believed to have been partly inspired by the exploits of the late 17th century English pirate Henry Every.

The narrative describes the life of the Englishman, Singleton, stolen from a well-to-do family as a child and raised by Gypsies, eventually making his way to sea. The first half of the book concerns Singleton's crossing of Africa, the second half concerning his life as a pirate in the Indian Ocean and Arabian Sea. Defoe's description of piracy focuses for the most part on matters of economics and logistics, and Singleton's pirate behaves more like a merchant adventurer, perhaps Defoe's comment on the mercantilism of his day.

== Plot ==
A young, upper-class English boy is kidnapped and sold by a beggar-woman to a gypsy, who, not knowing his real name, names him Bob Singleton. She raises him until about the age of six when she is hanged. He is then raised as a ward of a parish, and sent to sea at age twelve, going on journeys to Newfoundland. In 1695, while returning from one of these journeys, he is captured by Turkish pirates and subsequently rescued by Portuguese sailors who carry him to Lisbon. After a two-year stay there, he sails for Brazil and later the East Indies. Singleton becomes a thief under the influence of the Portuguese and harbours a desire to kill his master, who refuses to pay him wages and beats him. Nearly hanged for his part in an attempted mutiny, Singleton, now about seventeen or eighteen, is set ashore with four companions on the coast of Madagascar. A score of other sailors from the ship join them and together they endeavour to survive on the island, hunting wild animals and trading with the natives. Together they build a canoe and travel in it to the mainland where they decide to pursue a journey through Africa, from the coast of Mozambique to the Gold Coast.

During the hazardous trip Singleton becomes the leader of the group. They enslave about sixty of the natives, one a prince, and procure some buffalo to transport their supplies. They heal the prince and make him commander over the rest. The travellers march through lands teeming with leopards, elephants, crocodiles, and snakes and cross a great desert. The marchers meet an English merchant who has been living with the natives and who persuades Singleton and his companions to stop awhile in order to dig for gold. Having loaded themselves down with gold and elephant tusks, the adventurers finally reach a Dutch settlement, where they divide the spoils and immediately go their separate ways.

Once Singleton has spent his fortune in England, he sets out again, this time for the West Indies where he quickly takes to piracy. Singleton's abilities bring him high command, although his piratical activities encourage the growth of a callousness so pervasive that at times it leads to cruelty. There are chases and sea battles in which Singleton proves himself an able, courageous, and imaginative leader. From the Indies the scene shifts to the East African coast and Madagascar where the pirates continue to plunder and sail restlessly in search of new conquests. This lust for novelty takes Singleton and his men into the Pacific as far as the Philippines, before returning to the Indian Ocean and Ceylon.

William, a Quaker surgeon, outwits a Ceylonese King and rescues a Dutch slave. William displays further resourcefulness by succeeding in trade negotiations with English merchants in India. He serves Singleton loyally and bravely as a kind of man Friday: he is, moreover, a Christian humanist and healer who ultimately persuades his captain that a life of piracy leads nowhere. When Singleton contemplates suicide in the throes of repentance, William convinces him that suicide is the "Devil's Notion" and therefore must be ignored.

When they return to England, disguised as Armenians, they make the decision to stay together for the rest of their lives. Singleton marries William's sister, a widow, and the story ends on a note of domestic peace.

== Characters ==
- Captain Bob Singleton
- William Walters, a Quaker
- Captain John Wilmot
- Captain Frank Avery

== Major themes ==
- Piracy – The second half of the novel details Singleton's ship and crew as they plan and attack merchants and steal their cargo.
- Mercantilism – Though Singleton is a pirate who murders and steals, there are several examples of honest trading.
- Exploration – Singleton makes an immense sweep geographically, covering areas such as Southampton, Lisbon, the East Indies, Cabo de bona Speranza, Madagascar, Africa, the West Indies, Black Sea, and the Asian Archipelagos. His voyages mirror and celebrate those of Christopher Columbus, Ferdinand Magellan, and Vasco de Gama.
- Slavery – Captain Singleton's abduction and sale as a young boy is a part of Defoe's exploration of slavery within the novel. Some studies have focused on Captain Singleton in relation to its "commentary on African slavery", even suggesting that it might be read as a narrative of slavery. There is discussion of the "Plantation" within the novel; "a site of unfree, hard labor", and "by invoking the 'Plantation', Defoe demonstrates the elision between slavery and servitude practiced in the North American colonies and the Caribbean. [...] The notion that an English child can be 'sold' (and invoked by the author in a casual manner as though it is not an unusual occurrence) indicates that slavery in the New World had not settled into racialized dichotomies." The novel explores many different kinds of slavery, and "Defoe's character operates in a context where he is both capable of enslaving as well as being enslaved. This duality of experience forms a recurring theme in the novel that illustrates many forms of enslavement and beliefs about enslavement." The text represents "anxiety about the many slaveries to which man was prey during the eighteenth century. The enslavements expressed both physically and metaphorically demonstrate concepts in flux as ideas of trade, nationality, and the nature of man clashed. [...] Defoe, through Singleton, comments extensively about different forms of enslavement (as both master and slave), albeit filtered through a very Eurocentric perspective."
