= The True-Born Englishman =

Satirical poem made by Daniel Defoe

The True-Born Englishman is a satirical poem published in 1701 by English writer Daniel Defoe defending King William III, who was Dutch-born, against xenophobic attacks by his political enemies in England. The poem quickly became a bestseller in England.

According to a preface Defoe supplied to an edition of 1703, the poem's declared target is not Englishness as such but English cultural xenophobia, against the cultural disturbance new immigrants from Continental Europe caused. Defoe's argument was that the English nation as it already existed in his time was a product of various emigrating European ethnic groups, from the Ancient Britons to Anglo-Saxons, Normans and beyond. It was therefore nonsensical to abuse newer arrivals since the English law and customs would assure their inevitable assimilation:

I only infer, that an English Man, of all Men ought not to despise Foreigners as such, and I think the Inference is just, since what they are to Day, we were yesterday, and to morrow they will be like us. If Foreigners misbehave in their several Stations and Employments, I have nothing to do with that; the Laws are open to punish them equally with Natives, and let them have no Favour.

But when I see the Town full of Lampoons and Invectives against Dutchmen, Only because they are Foreigners, and the King Reproached and Insulted by Insolent Pedants, and Ballad-making Poets, for employing Foreigners, and for being a Foreigner himself, I confess my self moved by it to remind our Nation of their own Original, thereby to let them see what a Banter is put upon our selves in it; since speaking of Englishmen ab Origine, we are really all Foreigners our selves.

— from "An Explanatory Preface"

== Extract ==
Thus from a Mixture of all Kinds began,
That Het'rogeneous Thing, An Englishman:
In eager Rapes, and furious Lust begot,
Betwixt a Painted Britain and a Scot.
Whose gend'ring Off-spring quickly learn'd to Bow,
And yoke their Heifers to the Roman Plough:
From whence a Mongrel half-Bred Race there came,
With neither Name, nor Nation, Speech or Fame.
In whose hot Veins new Mixtures quickly ran,
Infus'd betwixt a Saxon and a Dane.
While their Rank Daughters, to their Parents just,
Receiv'd all nations with promiscuous lust.
This Nauseous Brood directly did contain
The well extracted Blood of Englishmen.

This extract was used by historian and political scientist Benedict Anderson as an epigram for his 1983 book Imagined Communities discussing the origins of nationalism.
