= Charles Drelincourt =

French Protestant divine (1595–1669)

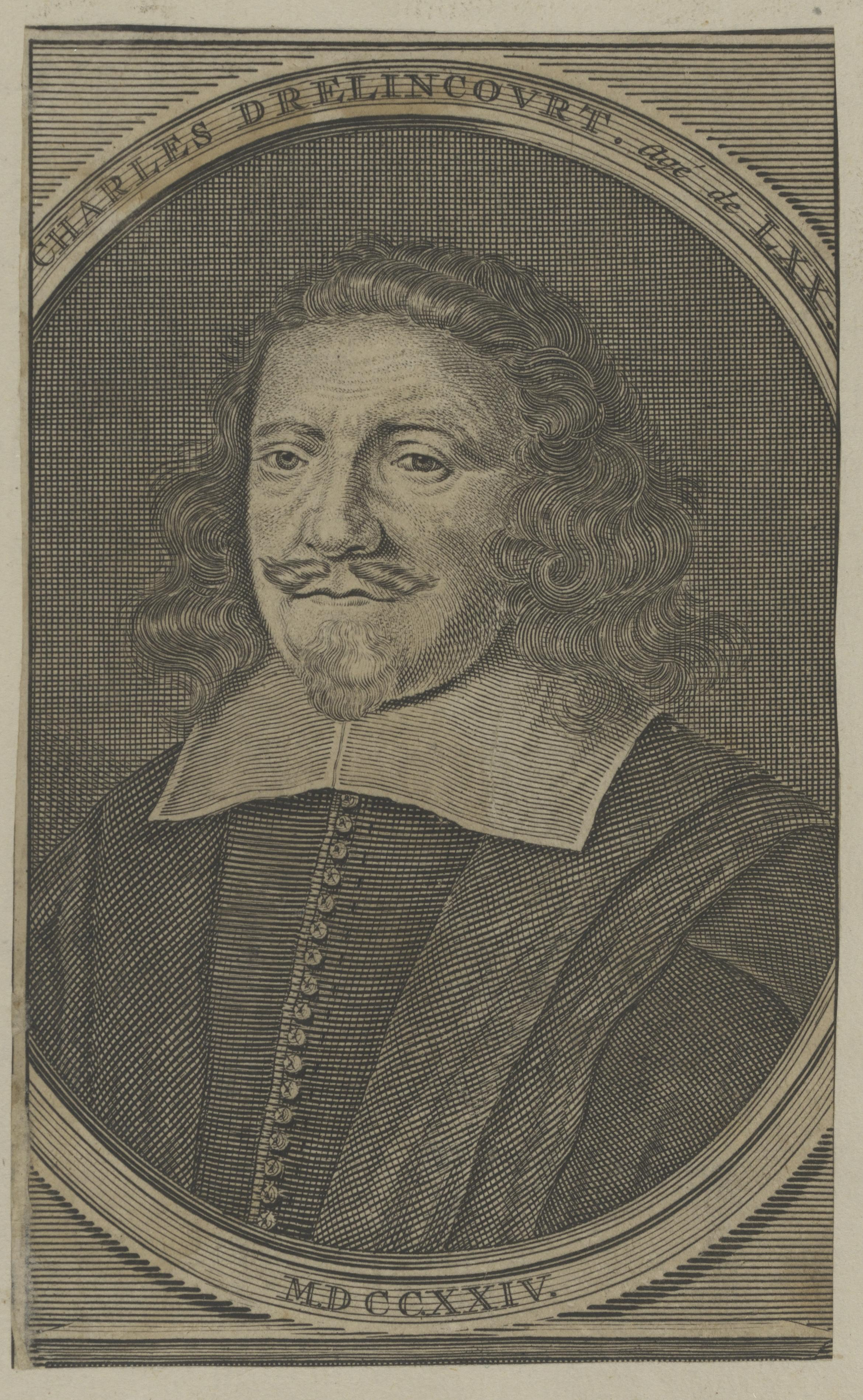

Personal life
- Born: 10 July 1595 Sedan
- Died: 3 November 1669 (aged 74)
- Children: Laurent Delincourt; Charles Delincourt; Pierre Delincourt
- Notable work: Anti-Catholic writings

Religious life
- Religion: Christian
- Denomination: Protestant
- Church: Reformed Church

Senior posting
- Post: Minister at Langres; Minister at Charenton

Charles Drelincourt (10 July 1595 in Sedan – 3 November 1669) was a French Protestant divine.

== Life ==
His father, Pierre Drelincourt, fled from religious persecution in Caen and became secretary to Henri de La Tour d'Auvergne, Duke of Bouillon at Sedan, Ardennes. In 1618, Charles undertook the charge of the French Protestant church at Langres, but failed to receive the necessary royal sanction, and early in 1620 he removed to Paris, where he was nominated minister of the Reformed Church at Charenton.

== Works ==
Drelincourt was the author of a large number of works in devotional and polemical theology, several of which had great influence. His Catechism (Catéchisme ou instruction familière, 1652) and his The Christian's Defence against the Fears of Death (Consolations de l'âme fidèle contre les frayeurs de la mort, 1651) became well known in England by means of translations, which were very frequently reprinted. It has been said that Daniel Defoe wrote his 1706 pamphlet of Mrs Veal ( A True Relation of the Apparition of Mrs Veal), who came from the other world to recommend the perusal of Drelincourt on death, for the express purpose of promoting the sale of an English translation of the Consolations; Defoe's text is added to the fourth edition of the translation (1706). Another popular work of Drelincourt was Les Visites charitables pour toutes sortes de personnes affligés (1669). Drelincourt's controversial works were numerous. Directed entirely against Roman Catholicism, they did much to strengthen and consolidate the Protestant party in France.

== Family ==
He married the only daughter of a wealthy Parisian beer brewer. Several of his sons were distinguished as theologians or physicians:

- Laurent (1626–1681) became a pastor, and was the author of Sonnets chrétiens sur divers sujets (1677)
- Charles (1633–1697) was physician of Louis XIV and professor of medicine at the University of Leiden
- Pierre or Peter (1644–1722) was educated in Geneva, ordained a priest in the Church of Ireland, and became dean of Armagh Cathedral, where a statue stands in his memory. Peter was the ancestor of Richard Francis Burton, and his daughter was the wife of Hugh, 3rd Viscount of Primrose.
