= Memoirs of a Cavalier =

1720 novel by Daniel Defoe

- Author: Daniel Defoe
- Language: English
- Publication date: 1720

Memoirs of a Cavalier (1720) is a work of historical fiction by Daniel Defoe, set during the Thirty Years' War and the English Civil Wars. The full title, which bore no date, was:

Memoirs of a Cavalier; or A Military Journal of the Wars in Germany, and the Wars in England. From the Years 1632 to 1648. Written threescore years ago, by an English gentleman, who served first in the army of Gustavus Adolphus, the Glorious King of Sweden, till his death, and after that in the Royal Army of King Charles the First, from the beginning of the Rebellion to the end of the War.

== Nominal author ==
The nominal author of the work was a 'Colonel Andrew Newport', a Shropshire-born soldier. He has been speculatively identified with the Andrew Newport (1622-1699). However the work was published over 20 years after the death of this Andrew Newport, who was only ten years old in the year the account begins (1632). Although of age (20 in 1642) to have served in the English Civil War, there is doubt about this due to the absence of any record that he did, and he appears in no list of Royalists fined by parliament for 'delinquency', unlike his father and elder brother.

== Literary influence ==
Winston Churchill modeled his six-volume histories The World Crisis and The Second World War on Memoirs of a Cavalier. Defoe's method "in which the author hangs the chronicle and discussion of great military and political events upon the thread of the personal experiences of an individual" suited Churchill's sprawling histories of World War I and World War II. In defending this stylistic choice, Churchill wrote, "I am perhaps the only man who has passed through both the two supreme cataclysms of recorded history in high Cabinet office."
