= Ludwig Babenstuber =

German philosopher and theologian (1660–1726)

Ludwig Babenstuber (1660 – 5 April 1726) was a German philosopher and theologian and vice-chancellor of the University of Salzburg.

== Biography ==
Babenstuber was born in 1660 at Thaining in Bavaria. Having completed his early studies he entered the novitiate of the Order of St. Benedict at Ettal Abbey in 1681, made his religious profession in 1682, and thereafter devoted the greater part of his life to teaching.

At the commencement of his studies he had given no promise of brilliancy, but by his untiring application and industry he shortly acquired so vast a store of knowledge, that he soon came to be regarded as one of the most learned men of his day -- "vir consummatae in omni genere doctrinae et probitatis", as he is styled in Felix Egger's Idea ordinis Hierarchico-Benedictini, and in the History of the University of Salzburg. Until 1690 Babenstuber was Director of the scholasticate of his order at Salzburg, taught philosophy there from 1690 to 1693, then went to the Augustinian Schlehdorf Abbey to teach theology in the monastery of the Canons Regular.

Returning to Salzburg in 1695, he took up successively the professorships of moral theology, dogmatic theology, and exegesis, in the Benedictine university of that city. He remained at Salzburg for twenty-two years, during which period he held the office of vice-rector for three years, and that of vice-chancellor of the university for six. In 1717 he returned to his monastery at Ettal, where he spent the remainder of his days.

Babenstuber died on 5 April 1726 at the Benedictine monastery of Ettal.

== Philosophy ==
In dogmatic theology Babenstuber was a pronounced Thomist; in moral, a vigorous defender of probabilism. He maintained, among other things, that a single author, if he were "beyond contradiction" ("omni exceptione major"), could, of his own authority, render an opinion probable, even against general opinion. In matters of faith, however, he rejected the principle of probabilism absolutely. In one of his disquisitions he had also stated that it was allowable to celebrate Mass privately on Maundy Thursday and Holy Saturday, but before his Ethica Supernaturalis had issued from the press, he learned that the Roman tribunals forbade it, and so he promptly corrected that assertion.

Babenstuber's published works include a wide range of subjects, mainly philosophical and theological. The most important are Philosophia Thomistica (4 vols., Salzburg, 1704) and Ethica Supernaturalis (Augsburg, 1718).
