= The Political History of the Devil =

1726 book by Daniel Defoe

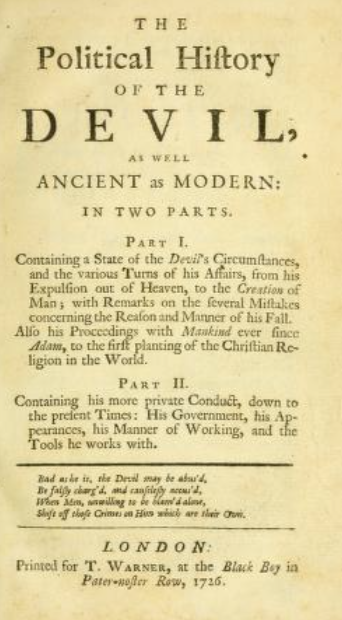
- Title page for The Political History of the Devil (1726)
- Author: Daniel Defoe
- Language: English
- Publication date: 1726
- Publication place: United Kingdom

The Political History of the Devil is a 1726 book by Daniel Defoe.

General scholarly opinion is that Defoe really did think of the Devil as a participant in world history. He spends some time discussing John Milton's Paradise Lost and explaining why he considers it inaccurate.

His view is that of an 18th-century Presbyterian – he blames the Devil for the Crusades and sees him as close to Europe's Catholic powers. The book was banned by the Roman Catholic Church.

== Trivia ==
The book is listed as one belonging to Mr. Tulliver and read by his daughter Maggie in George Eliot's The Mill on the Floss.

== See also ==
- De Betoverde Weereld
