= Daniel Defoe =

English writer, merchant and spy (1660–1731)

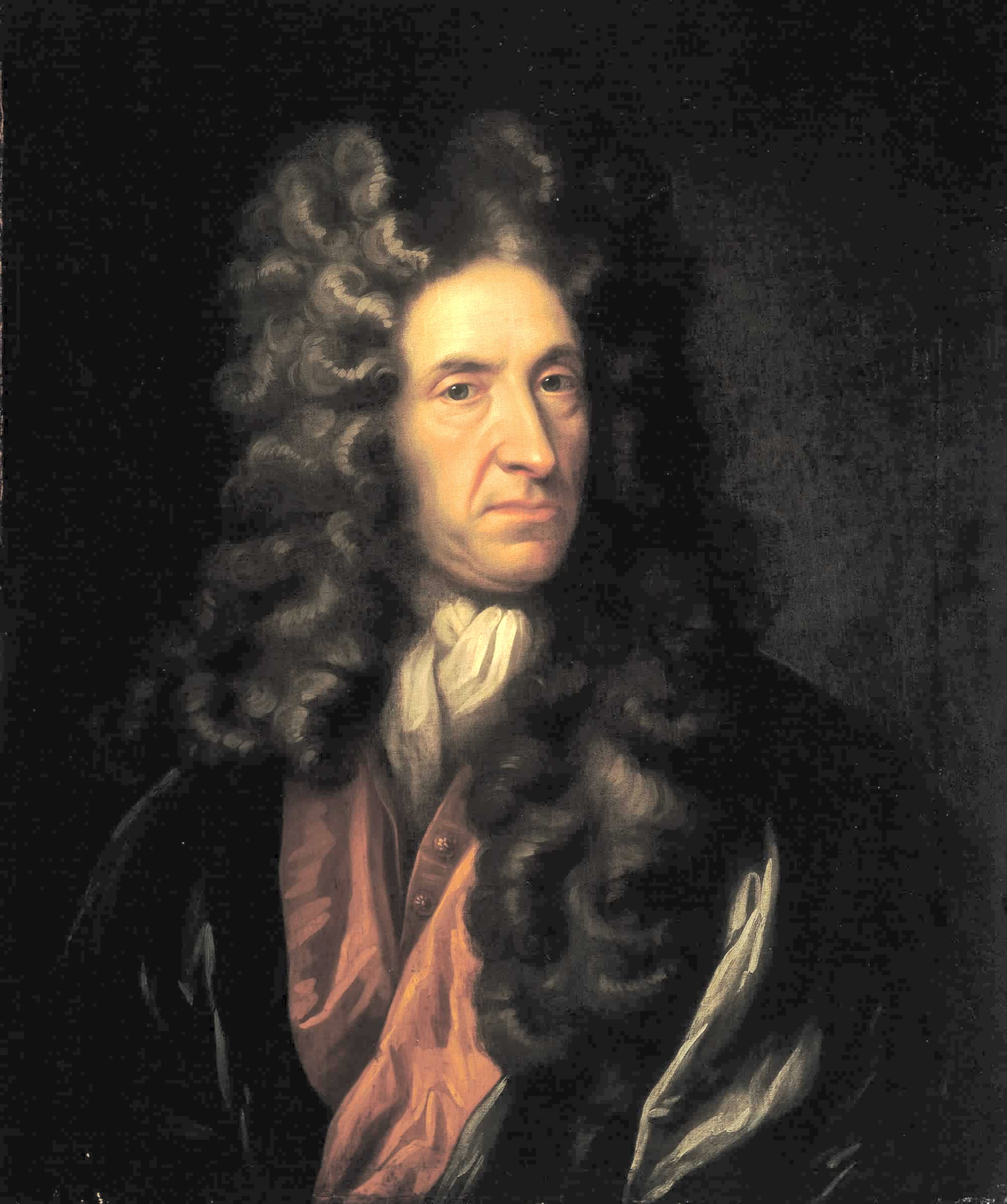
- Portrait of Defoe in the style of Sir Godfrey Kneller
- Born: Daniel Foe c. 1660; Fore Street, London
- Died: 24 April 1731 (aged 70–71); London, England
- Resting place: Bunhill Fields
- Occupations: Writer, merchant, spy
- Spouse: Mary Tuffley (m. 1684)
- Children: 8
- Writing career
- Genre: Adventure

Daniel Defoe (/dɪˈfoʊ/, born Daniel Foe; c. 1660 – 24 April 1731) was an English writer, journalist, merchant and spy. He is famous for his novels Robinson Crusoe (1719), Moll Flanders (1722), Colonel Jack (1722), and Roxana: The Fortunate Mistress (1724). He has been seen as one of the earliest proponents of the English novel, and helped to popularise the form in Britain with others such as Aphra Behn and Samuel Richardson.

Before the end of 1719, Robinson Crusoe had already run through four editions, and it has gone on to become one of the most widely published books in history, spawning so many imitations that its name is used to define a genre, the Robinsonade. Defoe also wrote many political tracts, was often in trouble with the authorities, and spent a period in prison. Intellectuals and political leaders paid attention to his fresh ideas and sometimes consulted him.

== Early life ==
Daniel Foe was probably born in Fore Street in the parish of St Giles Cripplegate, London. Defoe later added the aristocratic-sounding "De" to his name, and on occasion made the false claim of descent from a family named De Beau Faux. "De" is also a common prefix in Flemish surnames. His birthdate and birthplace are uncertain, and sources offer dates from 1659 to 1662, with the summer or early autumn of 1660 considered the most likely. His father, James Foe, was a prosperous tallow chandler of probable Flemish descent, (Note: The surname Defoe is of Flemish origin, probably derived from Faux or one of its variants, such as Defauw. Defoe lauded Elizabeth for encouraging the Flemings. It is thought that he was aware of his origins and it is possible that he understood some Flemish/Dutch, since his library had Dutch titles.) and a member of the Worshipful Company of Butchers. His mother, Alice, had died by the time he was about ten.

In Defoe's early childhood, he lived through several significant historical events: in 1665, seventy thousand were killed by the Great Plague of London, and the next year, the Great Fire of London left only Defoe's and two other houses standing in his neighbourhood. In 1667, when he was probably about seven, a Dutch fleet sailed up the Medway via the River Thames and attacked the town of Chatham in the raid on the Medway.

=== Education ===
Defoe was educated at the Rev. James Fisher's boarding school in Pixham Lane in Dorking, Surrey. His parents were Presbyterian dissenters, and around the age of 14, he was sent to Charles Morton's dissenting academy at Newington Green, then a village just north of London, where he is believed to have attended the Dissenting church there. He lived on Church Street, Stoke Newington, at what is now nos. 95–103. During this period, the English government persecuted those who chose to worship outside the established Church of England.

== Business career ==
Defoe entered the world of business as a general merchant, dealing at different times in hosiery, general woollen goods, and wine. His ambitions were great and he was able to buy a country estate and a ship (as well as civets to make perfume), though he was rarely out of debt. On 1 January 1684, Defoe married Mary Tuffley at St Botolph's Aldgate. She was the daughter of a London merchant, and brought with her a dowry of £3,700—equivalent to £690,000 in 2025. Given his debts and political difficulties, the marriage may have been troubled, but it lasted 47 years and produced eight children.

In 1685, Defoe joined the ill-fated Monmouth Rebellion but gained a pardon, by which he escaped the Bloody Assizes of Judge George Jeffreys. Queen Mary II and her husband William III were jointly crowned in 1689, and Defoe became one of William's close allies and a secret agent. Some of the new policies led to conflict with France, thus damaging prosperous trade relationships for Defoe. In 1692, he was arrested for debts of £700 and, in the face of total debts that may have amounted to £17,000, was forced to declare bankruptcy. He died with little wealth and evidently embroiled in lawsuits with the royal treasury.

Following his release from debtors' prison, he probably travelled in Europe and Scotland, and it may have been at this time that he traded wine to Cádiz, Porto and Lisbon. By 1695, he was back in England, now formally using the name "Defoe" and serving as a "commissioner of the glass duty", responsible for collecting taxes on bottles. In 1696, he ran a tile and brick factory in what is now Tilbury in Essex and lived in the parish of Chadwell St Mary nearby.

== Writing ==
As many as 545 titles have been attributed to Defoe, including satirical poems, political and religious pamphlets, and volumes.

=== Pamphleteering and prison ===
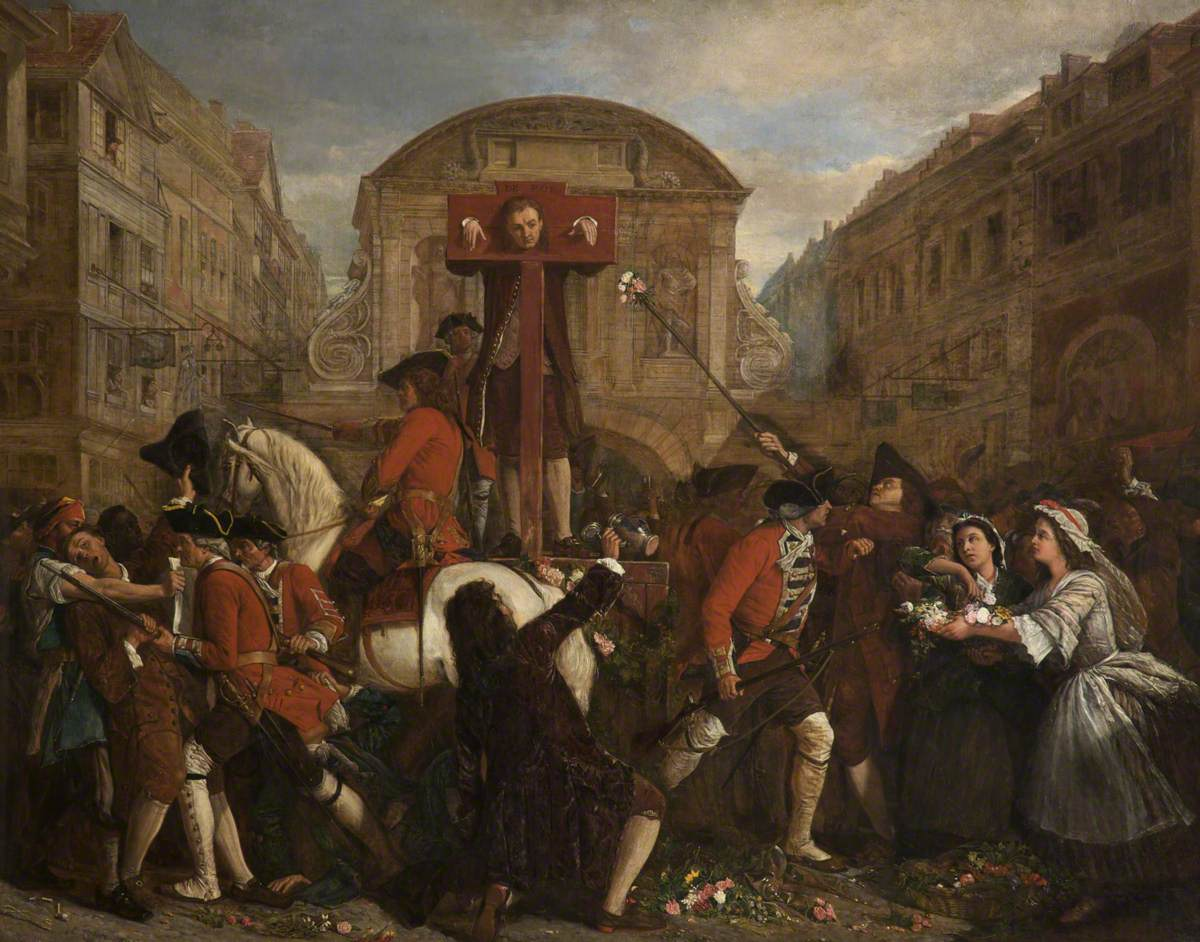
Daniel Defoe in the Pillory (Eyre Crowe, 1862)

Defoe's first notable publication was An Essay Upon Projects, a series of proposals for social and economic improvement, published in 1697. From 1697 to 1698, he defended the right of King William III to a standing army during disarmament, after the Treaty of Ryswick (1697) had ended the Nine Years' War (1688–1697). His most successful poem, The True-Born Englishman (1701), defended William against xenophobic attacks from his political enemies in England, and English anti-immigration sentiments more generally. In 1701, Defoe presented the Legion's Memorial to Robert Harley, then Speaker of the House of Commons—and his subsequent employer—while flanked by a guard of sixteen gentlemen of quality. It demanded the release of the Kentish petitioners, who had asked Parliament to support the king in an imminent war against France.

The death of William III in 1702 once again created a political upheaval, as the king was replaced by Queen Anne who immediately began her offensive against Nonconformists. Defoe was a natural target, and his pamphleteering and political activities resulted in his arrest and placement in a pillory on 31 July 1703, principally on account of his December 1702 pamphlet entitled The Shortest-Way with the Dissenters; Or, Proposals for the Establishment of the Church, purporting to argue for their extermination. In it, he ruthlessly satirised both the high church Tories and those Dissenters who hypocritically practised so-called "occasional conformity", such as his Stoke Newington neighbour Sir Thomas Abney. It was published anonymously, but the true authorship was quickly discovered and Defoe was arrested. He was charged with seditious libel and found guilty in a trial at the Old Bailey in front of the notoriously sadistic judge Salathiel Lovell. Lovell sentenced him to a punitive fine of 200 marks (£336 then, £70,201 in 2025), to public humiliation in a pillory, and to an indeterminate length of imprisonment which would end only upon the discharge of the punitive fine. According to legend, the publication of his poem Hymn to the Pillory caused his audience at the pillory to throw flowers instead of the customary harmful and noxious objects and to drink to his health. The truth of this story is questioned by most scholars, although John Robert Moore later said that "no man in England but Defoe ever stood in the pillory and later rose to eminence among his fellow men".

Wherever God erects a house of prayer,
The Devil always builds a chapel there:
And 'twill be found, upon examination,
The latter has the largest congregation

— Defoe's The True-Born Englishman, 1701

After his three days in the pillory, Defoe went into Newgate Prison. Robert Harley, 1st Earl of Oxford and Earl Mortimer, brokered his release in exchange for Defoe's cooperation as an intelligence agent for the Tories. In exchange for such cooperation with the rival political side, Harley paid some of Defoe's outstanding debts, improving his financial situation considerably.

Within a week of his release from prison, Defoe witnessed the Great Storm of 1703, which raged through the night of 26/27 November. It caused severe damage to London and Bristol, uprooted millions of trees, and killed more than 8,000 people, mostly at sea. The event became the subject of Defoe's The Storm (1704), which includes a collection of witness accounts of the tempest. Many regard it as one of the world's first examples of modern journalism.

In the same year, he set up his periodical A Review of the Affairs of France, which supported the Harley Ministry, chronicling the events of the War of the Spanish Succession (1702–1714). The Review ran three times a week without interruption until 1713. Defoe was amazed that a man as gifted as Harley left vital state papers lying in the open, and warned that he was almost inviting an unscrupulous clerk to commit treason; his warnings were fully justified by the William Gregg affair.

When Harley was ousted from the ministry in 1708, Defoe continued writing the Review to support Godolphin, then again to support Harley and the Tories in the Tory ministry of 1710–1714. The Tories fell from power with the death of Queen Anne, but Defoe continued doing intelligence work for the Whig government, writing "Tory" pamphlets that undermined the Tory point of view.

Not all of Defoe's pamphlet writing was political. One pamphlet was originally published anonymously, entitled A True Relation of the Apparition of One Mrs. Veal the Next Day after her Death to One Mrs. Bargrave at Canterbury The 8th of September, 1705. It deals with the interaction between the spiritual realm and the physical realm and was most likely written in support of Charles Drelincourt's The Christian Defence against the Fears of Death (1651). It describes Mrs. Bargrave's encounter with her old friend Mrs. Veal after she had died. It is clear from this piece and other writings that the political portion of Defoe's life was by no means his only focus.

=== Anglo-Scottish Union of 1707 ===
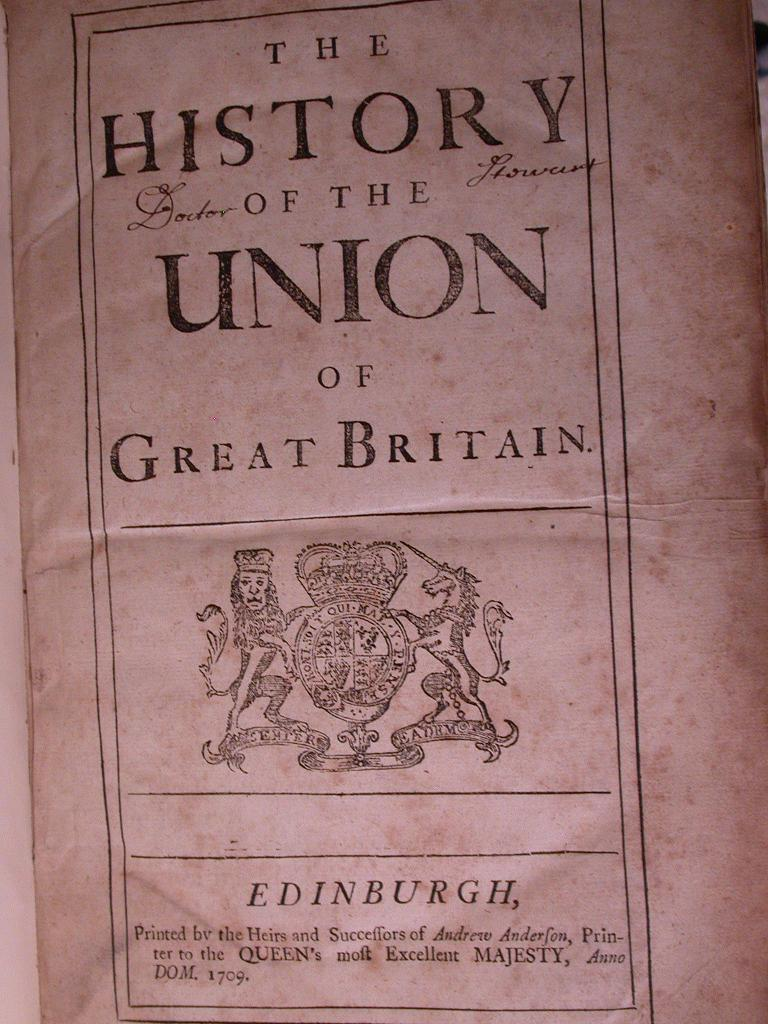
Title page from Daniel Defoe's: The History of the Union of Great Britain dated 1709 and printed in Edinburgh by the Heirs of Anderson

In despair during his imprisonment for the seditious libel case, Defoe wrote to William Paterson, the London Scot and founder of the Bank of England and part instigator of the Darien scheme, who was in the confidence of Robert Harley, 1st Earl of Oxford and Earl Mortimer, leading minister and spymaster in the English government. Harley accepted Defoe's services and released him in 1703. Defoe immediately published The Review, which appeared weekly, then three times a week, written mostly by himself. This was the main mouthpiece of the English Government promoting the Act of Union 1707.

Defoe began his campaign in The Review and other pamphlets aimed at English opinion, claiming that it would end the threat from the north, gaining for the Treasury an "inexhaustible treasury of men", a valuable new market increasing the power of England. By September 1706, Harley ordered Defoe to travel to Edinburgh as a secret agent, and to secure acquiescence by using "underhand methods to predispose Scots' opinion in favour of" the Treaty of Union. He was conscious of the risk to himself. Thanks to books such as The Letters of Daniel Defoe, far more is known about his activities than is usual with such agents.

Defoe's first reports included vivid descriptions of violent demonstrations against the Union. "A Scots rabble is the worst of its kind", he reported. Defoe "became fearful of being lynched after a threatening crowd surged up the High Street shouting 'No Union! No English dogs!'" Years later John Clerk of Penicuik, a leading Unionist, wrote in his memoirs that it was not known at the time that Defoe had been sent by Godolphin:

to give a faithful account to him from time to time how everything past here. He was therefor a spy among us, but not known to be such, otherways the Mob of Edin. had pull him to pieces.

Defoe was a Presbyterian who had suffered in England for his convictions, and as such he was accepted as an adviser to the General Assembly of the Church of Scotland and committees of the Parliament of Scotland. He told Harley that he was "privy to all their folly" but "Perfectly unsuspected as with corresponding with anybody in England". He was then able to influence the proposals that were put to Parliament and reported,

Having had the honour to be always sent for the committee to whom these amendments were referrèd,
I have had the good fortune to break their measures in two particulars via the bounty on Corn and
proportion of the Excise.

For Scotland, he used different arguments, even the opposite of those which he used in England, usually ignoring the English doctrine of the Sovereignty of Parliament, for example, telling the Scots that they could have complete confidence in the guarantees in the Treaty. Some of his pamphlets were purported to be written by Scots, misleading even reputable historians into quoting them as evidence of Scottish opinion of the time. The same is true of a massive history of the Union which Defoe published in 1709 and which some historians still treat as a valuable contemporary source for their own works. Defoe took pains to give his history an air of objectivity by giving some space to arguments against the Union, but always kept the last word for himself.

He disposed of the main Union opponent, Andrew Fletcher of Saltoun, by ignoring him. Nor does he account for the deviousness of the Duke of Hamilton, the official leader of the various factions opposed to the Union, who seemingly betrayed his former colleagues when he switched to the Unionist/Government side in the decisive final stages of the debate.

==== Aftermath ====
In 1709, Defoe authored a lengthy book entitled The History of the Union of Great Britain, an Edinburgh publication printed by the Heirs of Anderson. Defoe is cited twice in the book as its author, and gives details of the events leading up to the Acts of Union 1707, dating as far back as 6 December 1604, when King James I was presented with a proposal for unification. This so-called "first draft" for unification took place just a little over 100 years before the signing of the 1707 accord.

Defoe made no attempt to explain why the same Parliament of Scotland which was so vehemently in favour of remaining independent from 1703 to 1705 became so supine in 1706. He received very little reward from his paymasters and no recognition for his services by the government. He made use of his Scottish experience to write his Tour thro' the whole Island of Great Britain, published in 1726, where he admitted that the increase of trade and population in Scotland which he had predicted as a consequence of the Union was "not the case, but rather the contrary".

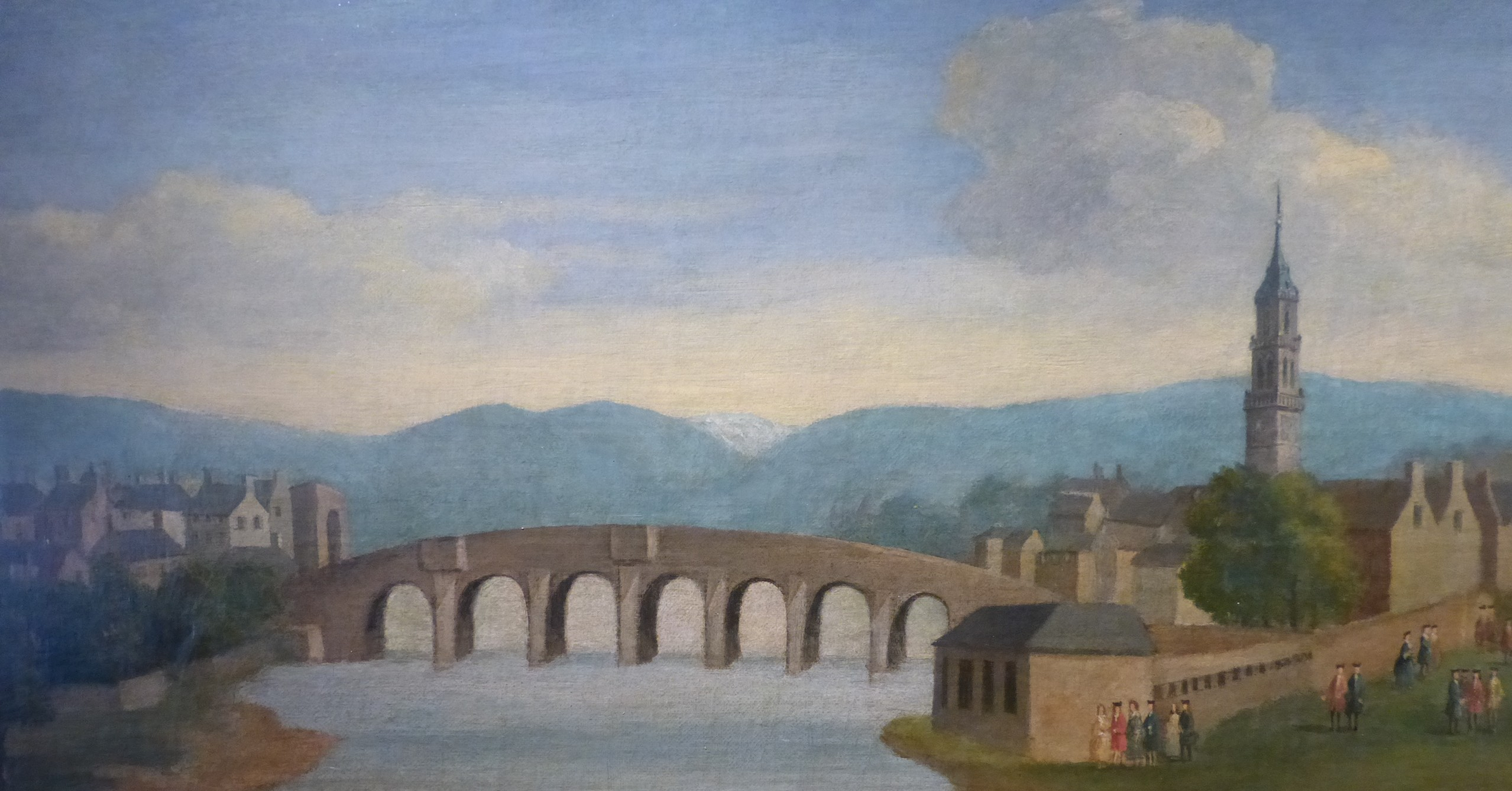
Glasgow Bridge as Defoe might have seen it in the 18th century

Defoe's description of Glasgow (Glaschu) as a "Dear Green Place" has often been misquoted as a Gaelic translation for the town's name. The Gaelic Glas could mean grey or green, while chu means dog or hollow. Glaschu probably means "Green Hollow". The "Dear Green Place", like much of Scotland, was a hotbed of unrest against the Union. The local Tron minister urged his congregation "to up and anent for the City of God".

The "Dear Green Place" and "City of God" required government troops to put down the rioters tearing up copies of the Treaty at almost every mercat cross in Scotland. When Defoe visited in the mid-1720s, he claimed that the hostility towards his party was "because they were English and because of the Union, which they were almost universally exclaimed against".

=== Late writing ===
The extent and particulars are widely contested concerning Defoe's writing in the period from the Tory fall in 1714 to the publication of Robinson Crusoe in 1719. Defoe comments on the tendency to attribute tracts of uncertain authorship to him in his apologia Appeal to Honour and Justice (1715), a defence of his part in Harley's Tory ministry (1710–1714). Other works that anticipate his novelistic career include The Family Instructor (1715), a conduct manual on religious duty; Minutes of the Negotiations of Monsr. Mesnager (1717), in which he impersonates Nicolas Mesnager, the French plenipotentiary who negotiated the Treaty of Utrecht (1713); and A Continuation of the Letters Writ by a Turkish Spy (1718), a satire of European politics and religion, ostensibly written by a Muslim in Paris.

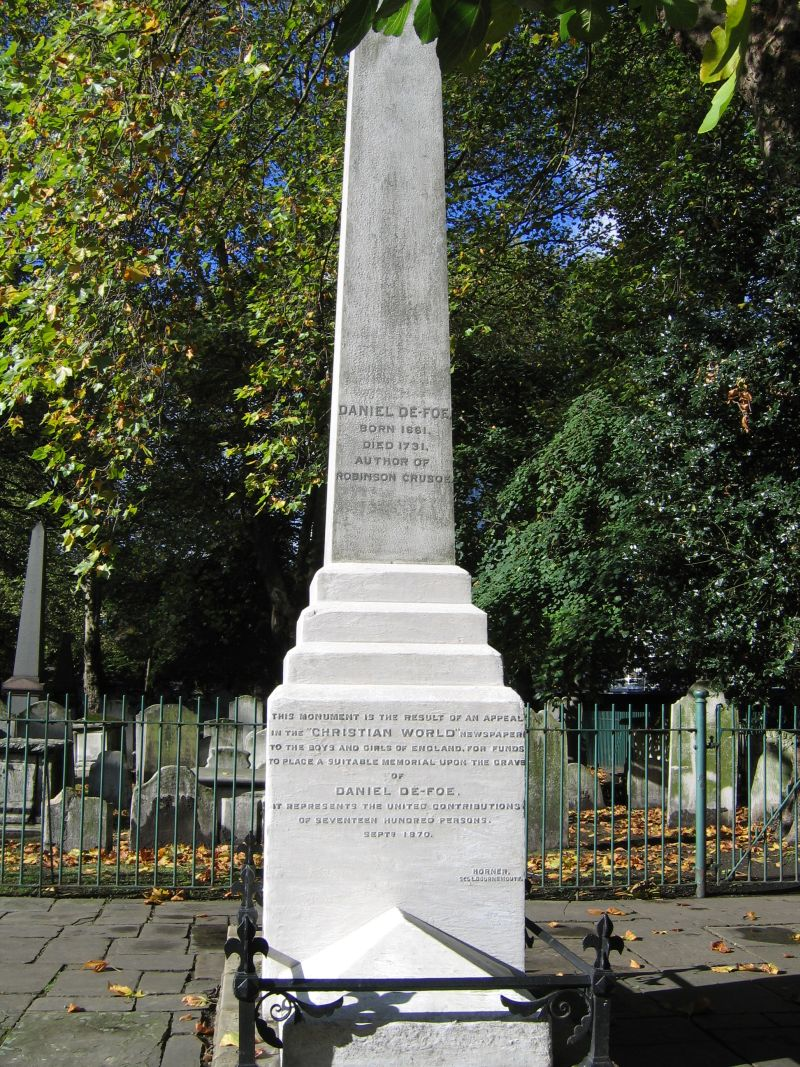
Memorial to "Daniel De-Foe", Bunhill Fields, City Road, Borough of Islington, London

From 1719 to 1724, Defoe published the novels for which he is famous (see below). In the final decade of his life, he also wrote conduct manuals, including Religious Courtship (1722), The Complete English Tradesman (1726) and The New Family Instructor (1727). He published a number of books decrying the breakdown of the social order, such as The Great Law of Subordination Considered (1724) and Everybody's Business is Nobody's Business (1725) and works on the supernatural, like The Political History of the Devil (1726), A System of Magick (1727) and An Essay on the History and Reality of Apparitions (1727). His works on foreign travel and trade include A General History of Discoveries and Improvements (1727) and Atlas Maritimus and Commercialis (1728). Perhaps his most significant work, apart from the novels, is A Tour thro' the Whole Island of Great Britain (1724–1727), which provided a panoramic survey of British trade on the eve of the Industrial Revolution.

==== The Complete English Tradesman ====
Published in 1726, The Complete English Tradesman is an example of Defoe's political works. In the work, Defoe discussed the role of the tradesman in England in comparison to tradesmen internationally, arguing that the British system of trade is far superior. Defoe also implied that trade was the backbone of the British economy: "an estate's a pond, but a trade's a spring." In the work, Defoe praised the practicality of trade not only within the economy but the social stratification as well. Defoe argued that most of the British gentry was at one time or another inextricably linked with the institution of trade, either through personal experience, marriage or genealogy. Oftentimes younger members of noble families entered into trade, and marriages to a tradesman's daughter by a nobleman was also common. Overall, Defoe demonstrated a high respect for tradesmen, being one himself.

Not only did Defoe elevate individual British tradesmen to the level of gentleman, but he praised the entirety of British trade as a superior system to other systems of trade. Trade, Defoe argues, is a much better catalyst for social and economic change than war. Defoe also argued that through the expansion of the British Empire and British mercantile influence, Britain would be able to "increase commerce at home" through job creations and increased consumption. He wrote in the work that increased consumption, by laws of supply and demand, increases production and in turn raises wages for the poor, thereby lifting part of British society further out of poverty.

=== Novels ===
==== Robinson Crusoe ====
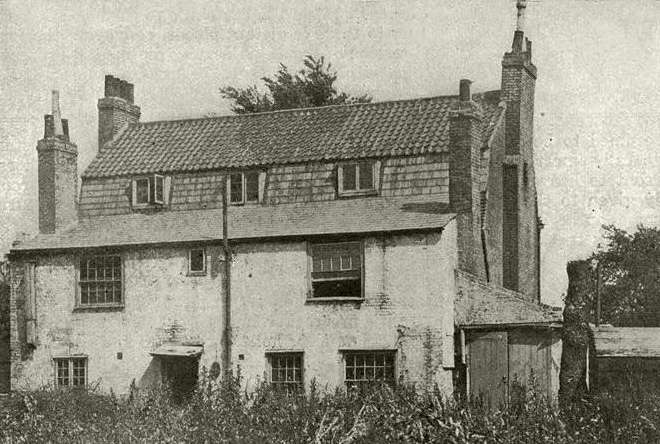
A house where Defoe once lived, near London, England

Published in 1719, when Defoe was in his late fifties, Robinson Crusoe relates the story of a man's shipwreck on a desert island for twenty-eight years and his subsequent adventures. Throughout its episodic narrative, Crusoe's struggles with faith are apparent as he bargains with God in times of life-threatening crises, but time and again he turns his back after his deliverances. He is finally content with his lot in life, separated from society, following a more genuine conversion experience.

In the opening pages of The Farther Adventures of Robinson Crusoe, the author describes how Crusoe settled in Bedfordshire, married and produced a family, and that when his wife died, he went off on these further adventures. Bedford is also the place where the brother of "H. F." in A Journal of the Plague Year retired to avoid the danger of the plague, so that by implication, if these works were not fiction, Defoe's family met Crusoe in Bedford, from whence the information in these books was gathered. Defoe went to school in Newington Green with a friend named Caruso.

The novel has been assumed to be based in part on the experience of the Scottish castaway Alexander Selkirk, who spent four years stranded in the Juan Fernández Islands, before being rescued in 1709 by Captain Woodes Rogers, who Defoe knew. The island Selkirk lived on, Más a Tierra (Closer to Land) was renamed Robinson Crusoe Island in 1966. It has also been suggested that Defoe was also inspired by a translation of a book by the Andalusian-Arab Muslim polymath Ibn Tufail, who was known as "Abubacer" in Europe. The Latin edition was entitled Philosophus Autodidactus; Simon Ockley published an English translation in 1708, entitled The improvement of human reason, exhibited in the life of Hai ebn Yokdhan.

==== Captain Singleton ====
Defoe's next novel was Captain Singleton (1720), an adventure story whose first half covers a traversal of Africa which anticipated subsequent discoveries by David Livingstone and whose second half taps into the contemporary fascination with piracy. The novel has been commended for its sensitive depiction of the close relationship between the hero and his religious mentor, Quaker William Walters. Its description of the geography of Africa and some of its fauna does not use the language or knowledge of a fiction writer and suggests an eyewitness experience.

==== Memoirs of a Cavalier ====
Memoirs of a Cavalier (1720) is set during the Thirty Years' War and the English Civil War.

==== A Journal of the Plague Year ====
A Journal of the Plague Year, published in 1722, can be read both as novel and as nonfiction. It is an account of the Great Plague of London in 1665, which is undersigned by the initials "H. F.", suggesting the author's uncle Henry Foe as its primary source. It is a historical account of the events based on extensive research and written as if by an eyewitness, even though Defoe was only about five years old when it occurred.

==== Colonel Jack ====
Colonel Jack (1722) follows an orphaned boy from a life of poverty and crime to prosperity in the colonies, military and marital imbroglios, and religious conversion, driven by a problematic notion of becoming a "gentleman".

==== Moll Flanders ====
Also in 1722, Defoe wrote Moll Flanders, another first-person picaresque novel of the fall and eventual redemption, both material and spiritual, of a lone woman in 17th-century England. The titular heroine appears as a whore, bigamist and thief, lives in The Mint, commits adultery and incest, and yet manages to retain the reader's sympathy. Her savvy manipulation of both men and wealth earns her a life of trials but ultimately an ending in reward. Although Moll struggles with the morality of some of her actions and decisions, religion seems to be far from her concerns throughout most of her story. However, like Robinson Crusoe, she finally repents. Moll Flanders is an important work in the development of the novel, as it challenged the common perception of femininity and gender roles in 18th-century British society. Although it was not intended as a work of erotica, later generations came to view it as such.

==== Roxana ====
Defoe's final novel, Roxana: The Fortunate Mistress (1724), which narrates the moral and spiritual decline of a high society courtesan, differs from other Defoe works because the main character does not exhibit a conversion experience, even though she claims to be a penitent later in her life, at the time that she is relating her story.

==== Patterns ====
In Defoe's writings, especially in his fiction, are traits that can be seen across his works. Defoe was well known for his didacticism, with most of his works aiming to convey a message of some kind to the readers (typically a moral one, stemming from his religious background). Connected to Defoe's didacticism is his use of the genre of spiritual autobiography, particularly in Robinson Crusoe. Another common feature of Defoe's fictional works is that he claimed they were true stories of their subjects.

=== Attribution and de-attribution ===
Defoe is known to have used at least 198 pen names. It was a very common practice in eighteenth-century novel publishing to initially publish works under a pen name, with most other authors at the time publishing their works anonymously. As a result of the anonymous ways in which most of his works were published, it has been a challenge for scholars over the years to properly credit Defoe for all of the works that he wrote in his lifetime. If counting only works that Defoe published under his own name, or his known pen name "the author of the True-Born Englishman", about 75 works can be attributed to him.

Beyond these 75 works, scholars have used a variety of strategies to determine what other works should be attributed to Defoe. Writer George Chalmers was the first to begin the work of attributing anonymously published works to Defoe. In History of the Union, he created an expanded list with over a hundred titles that he attributed to Defoe, alongside twenty additional works that he designated as "Books which are supposed to be De Foe's". Chalmers included works in his canon of Defoe that were particularly in line with his style and way of thinking, and ultimately attributed 174 works to Defoe. Many of the attributions of Defoe's novels came long after his death. Notably, Moll Flanders and Roxana were published anonymously for over fifty years until Francis Noble named Daniel Defoe on their title pages in edition publication in 1775 and 1774.

Biographer P. N. Furbank and W. R. Owens built upon this canon, also relying on what they believed could be Defoe's work, without a means to be absolutely certain. In the Cambridge History of English Literature, the section on Defoe by author William P. Trent attributes 370 works to Defoe. J. R. Moore generated the largest list of Defoe's work, with approximately 550 works that he attributed to Defoe.

== Death ==
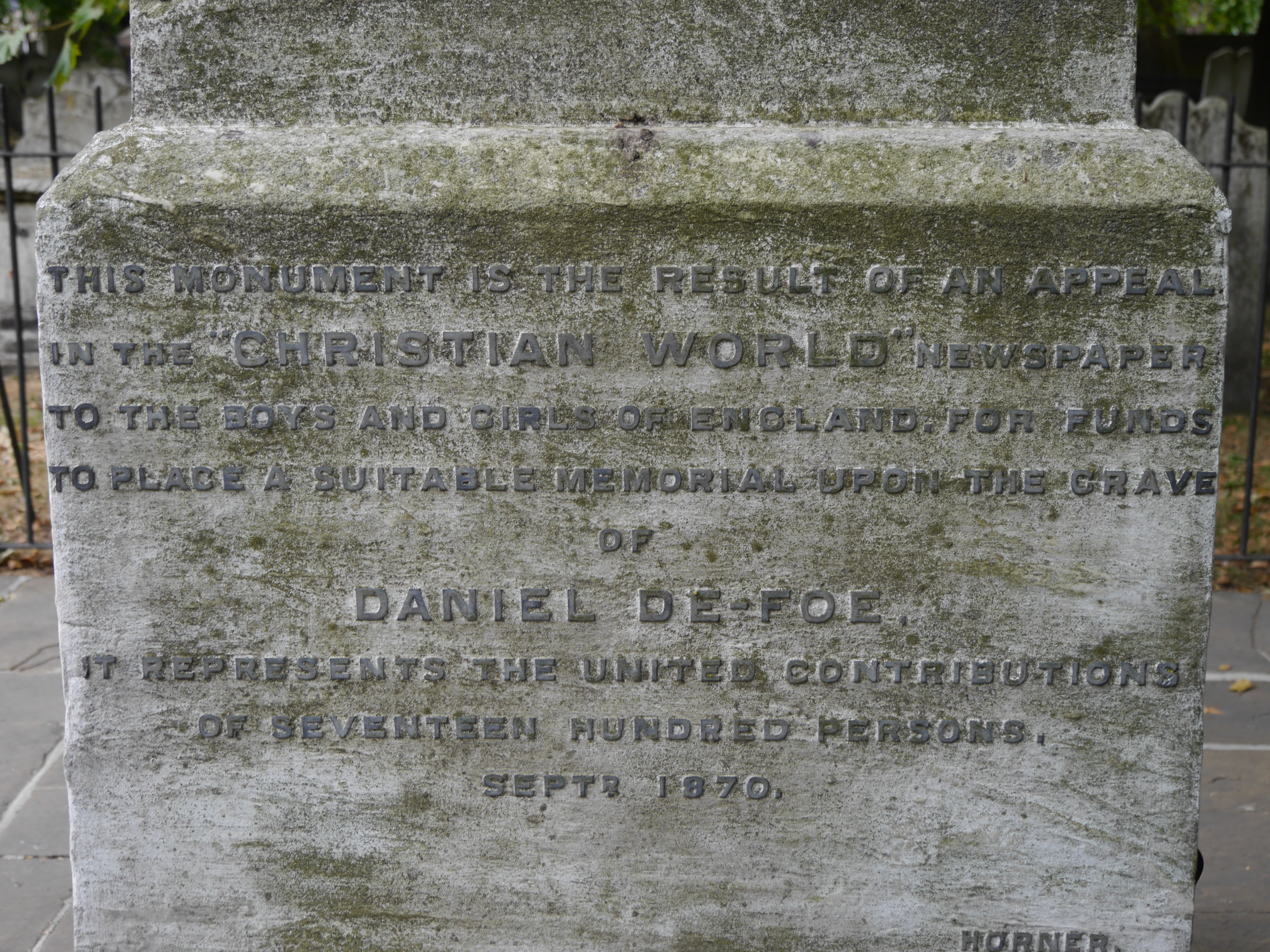
Bunhill Fields monument detail

Defoe died on 24 April 1731, in Ropemakers Alley, not far from where he was born in Cripplegate, probably while in hiding from his creditors. He was often in debtors' prison. The cause of his death was labelled as lethargy, but he probably experienced a stroke. He was interred in Bunhill Fields (today Bunhill Fields Burial and Gardens), just outside the medieval boundaries of the City of London, in what is now the Borough of Islington, where a monument was erected to his memory in 1870. A street in the Bronx, New York, is named in his honour (De Foe Place).

== Selected works ==
=== Novels ===
- The Consolidator, or Memoirs of Sundry Transactions from the World in the Moon: Translated from the Lunar Language (1705)
- Robinson Crusoe (1719) – originally published in two volumes:
  - The Life and Strange Surprizing Adventures of Robinson Crusoe, of York, Mariner: Who Lived Eight and Twenty Years [...]
  - The Farther Adventures of Robinson Crusoe: Being the Second and Last Part of His Life [...]
- Serious Reflections During the Life and Surprising Adventures of Robinson Crusoe: With his Vision of the Angelick World (1720)
- Captain Singleton (1720)
- Memoirs of a Cavalier (1720)
- A Journal of the Plague Year (1722)
- Colonel Jack (1722)
- Moll Flanders (1722)
- Roxana: The Fortunate Mistress (1724)
- The Four Years Voyages of Capt. George Roberts (1726) – disputed both in its fictional status and in Defoe's authorship

=== Nonfiction ===
- The Buccaneers and Marooners of America (1684) but this is a later (1891) illustrated version with details of the book's history.
- An Essay Upon Projects (1697) – subsections of the text include: "The History of Projects", "Of Projectors", "Of Banks", "Of the Highways", "Of Assurances", "Of Friendly Societies", "The Proposal is for a Pension Office," "Of Wagering", "Of Fools", "A Charity-Lottery", "Of Bankrupts", "Of Academies" (including a section proposing an academy for women), "Of a Court Merchant", and "Of Seamen".
- The Storm (1704) – describes the worst storm ever to hit Britain in recorded times. Includes eyewitness accounts.
- Atlantis Major (1711)
- The Family Instructor (1715)
- Memoirs of the Church of Scotland (1717)
- The History of the Remarkable Life of John Sheppard (1724) – describing Sheppard's life of crime and concluding with the miraculous escapes from prison that made him a public sensation.
- A Narrative of All The Robberies, Escapes, &c. of John Sheppard (1724) – written by or taken down from Sheppard himself in the condemned cell before he was hanged for theft, apparently by way of conclusion to Defoe's work. According to the Introduction to Volume 16 of the works of Defoe published by J. M. Dent in 1895, Sheppard handed the manuscript to the publisher Applebee from the prisoners' cart as he was taken away to be hanged. Defoe's edition of the text includes corrections of factual details and an explanation of how Sheppard's escapes from prison were achieved.
- A Tour thro' the Whole Island of Great Britain (1724–1727)
- A New Voyage Round the World (1724)
- The Political History of the Devil (1726)
- The Complete English Tradesman (1726)
- A Treatise Concerning the Use and Abuse of the Marriage Bed... (1727) (originally titled Conjugal Lewdness or, Matrimonial Whoredom)
- A Plan of the English Commerce (1728) – describes how the English woolen textile industrial base was developed by the protectionist measures of the Tudor monarchs, especially Henry VII of England and Elizabeth I, including high tariffs on the importation of finished woollen goods, high taxes on raw wool leaving England, bringing in artisans skilled in wool textile manufacturing from the Low Countries, selective government-granted monopoly rights, and government-sponsored industrial espionage.

=== Pamphlets or essays in prose ===
- The Poor Man's Plea (1698)
- The History of the Kentish Petition (1701)
- The Shortest Way with the Dissenters (1702)
- The Great Law of Subordination Consider'd (1704)
- Giving Alms No Charity, and Employing the Poor (1704)
- The Apparition of Mrs. Veal (1706)
- An Appeal to Honour and Justice, Tho' it be of his Worst Enemies, by Daniel Defoe, Being a True Account of His Conduct in Publick Affairs (1715)
- A Vindication of the Press: Or, An Essay on the Usefulness of Writing, on Criticism, and the Qualification of Authors (1718)
- Every-body's Business, Is No-body's Business (1725)
- The Protestant Monastery (1726)
- Parochial Tyranny (1727)
- Augusta Triumphans (1728)
- Second Thoughts are Best (1729)
- An Essay Upon Literature (1726)
- Mere Nature Delineated (1726)
- Conjugal Lewdness (1727) – Anti-Contraception Essay

=== Pamphlets or essays in verse ===
- The True-Born Englishman: A Satyr (1701)
- Hymn to the Pillory (1703)
- An Essay on the Late Storm (1704)
- Jure Divino: a satyr (1706)

=== Some contested works attributed to Defoe ===
- A Friendly Epistle by way of reproof from one of the people called Quakers, to T. B., a dealer in many words (1715).
- The King of Pirates (1719) – purporting to be an account of the pirate Henry Avery.
- The Pirate Gow (1725) – an account of John Gow.
- A General History of the Pyrates (1724, 1725, 1726, 1828) – published in two volumes by Charles Rivington, who had a shop near St. Paul's Cathedral, London. Published under the name of Captain Charles Johnson, it sold in many editions.
- Captain Carleton's Memoirs of an English Officer (1728).
- The life and adventures of Mrs. Christian Davies, commonly call'd Mother Ross (1740) – published anonymously; printed and sold by R. Montagu in London; and attributed to Defoe but more recently not accepted by Moore.

== See also ==
- Apprentice complex
- Moubray House
- Robert Drury (sailor) – whose book has been suggested by some was written by Defoe
