= 1766 in literature =

This article contains information about the literary events and publications of 1766.

== Events ==
- Early – The young Fanny Burney pays one of many visits to Samuel Crisp, a frustrated author and friend of her father living in retirement at Chessington Hall, England.
- May 30 – The Theatre Royal, Bristol, England, opens. Also this year in England, the surviving Georgian Theatre (Stockton-on-Tees) opens as a playhouse.
- July 1 – François-Jean de la Barre, a young French nobleman, is tortured and beheaded before his body is burnt on a pyre, with a copy of Voltaire's Dictionnaire philosophique nailed to his torso, for the crime of not saluting a Roman Catholic religious procession in Abbeville and for other acts of sacrilege, including desecration of a crucifix.
- December 2 – The Law on the Freedom of Printing abolishes censorship in Sweden and guarantees freedom of the press.
- unknown dates
  - The Drottningholm Palace Theatre is reopened as an opera house in Stockholm, Sweden, in its surviving form, designed by Carl Fredrik Adelcrantz.
  - Heinrich Wilhelm von Gerstenberg begins to publish his Briefe über Merkwürdigkeiten der Litteratur, in which he formulates the literary principles of Sturm und Drang.

== New books ==
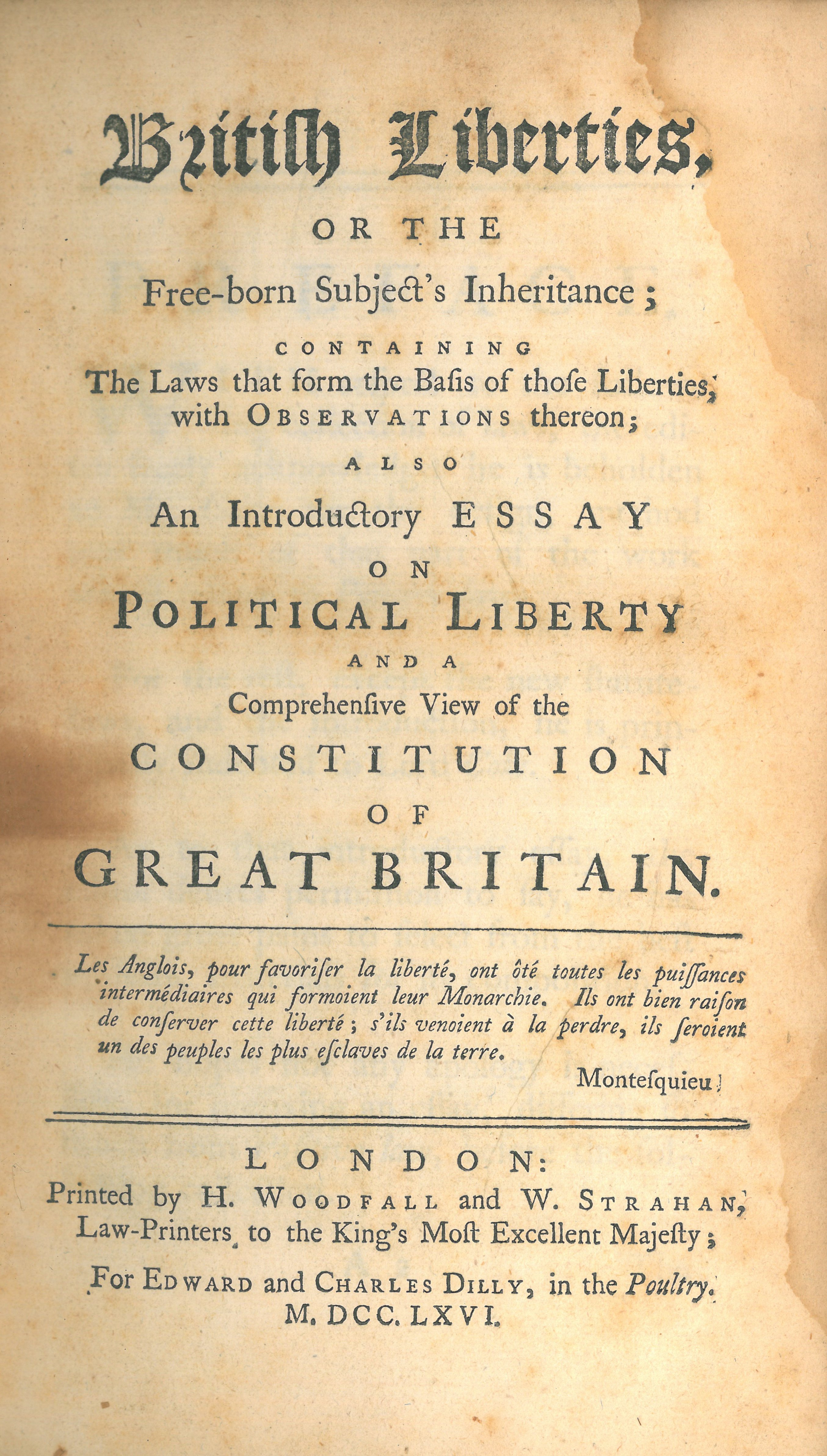
British Liberties, or the Free-born Subject's Inheritance, an anonymous 1766 book published by Henry Sampson Woodfall and William Strahan, "Law-Printers to the King's Most Excellent Majesty"

=== Fiction ===
- Henry Brooke – The Fool of Quality
- Oliver Goldsmith – The Vicar of Wakefield
- Catherine Jemmat – Miscellanies
- Charlotte Lennox – The History of Eliza
- Susannah Minifie – The Picture
- Sarah Scott – The History of Sir George Ellison
- Pu Songling (died 1715) – Strange Stories from a Chinese Studio (聊齋誌異, Liaozhai Zhiyi; first surviving printed edition)
- Christoph Martin Wieland – Geschichte des Agathon
- Anna Williams – Miscellanies in Prose and Verse

=== Drama ===
- George Colman the Elder and David Garrick – The Clandestine Marriage
- Ramón de la Cruz – La pradera de San Isidro
- Thomas Francklin – The Earl of Warrick
- Elizabeth Griffith – The Double Mistake

=== Poetry ===
- Mark Akenside – An Ode to the Late Thomas Edwards
- Christopher Anstey – The New Bath Guide
- James Beattie – Poems
- John Cunningham – Poems
- John Freeth – The Political Songster
- Oliver Goldsmith, ed. – Poems for Young Ladies
- Charles Jenner – Poems
- Henry James Pye – Beauty
- Heinrich Wilhelm von Gerstenberg – Gedicht eines Skalden

=== Non-fiction ===
- Francis Blackburne – The Confessional (theology of confession)
- Edmund Burke – A Short Account of a Late Short Administration
- Denis Diderot – Essais sur la peinture
- James Fordyce – Sermons to Young Women
- Immanuel Kant – Dreams of a Spirit-Seer
- Gotthold Ephraim Lessing – Laocoön
- Franz Mesmer – De planetarum influxu in corpus humanum (On the Influence of the Planets on the Human Body)
- Thomas Pennant – The British Zoology
- Pedro Rodríguez Mohedano and Rafael Rodríguez Mohedano – Historia literaria de España, desde su primera población hasta nuestros días (Literary history of Spain, from the first publication to the present day)
- Samuel Sharp – Letters from Italy
- Tobias Smollett – Travels through France and Italy
- Laurence Sterne – The Sermons of Mr Yorick vols. iii-iv
- George Stevens (editor) – Twenty of the Plays of Shakespeare
- Thomas Tyrwhitt – Observations and Conjectures Upon Some Passages of Shakespeare
- John Wesley – A Plain Account of Christian Perfection
- Henry Sampson Woodfall – British Liberties, or the Free-born Subject's Inheritance

== Births ==
- January 15 – Nathan Drake, English essayist and physician (died 1836)
- February 1 – Eliza Fenwick, English novelist and children's writer (died 1840)
- February 14 – Thomas Robert Malthus, English political scientist (died 1834)
- April 22 – Germaine de Staël (Anne Louise Germaine Necker), French novelist and saloniste (died 1817)
- May 11 – Isaac D'Israeli, English literary scholar (died 1848)
- August 16 – Carolina Oliphant, Lady Nairne, Scottish songwriter and collector (died 1845).
- October 11 – Nólsoyar Páll, Faroese merchant and poet (lost at sea c. 1808)

== Deaths ==
- March 3 – William Rufus Chetwood, Anglo-Irish playwright, novelist and publisher (year of birth unknown)
- March 21 – Richard Dawes, English classicist (born 1708)
- December 12 - Johann Christoph Gottsched, German philosopher (born 1700)
