= 1766 in poetry =

Nationality words link to articles with information on the nation's poetry or literature (for instance, Irish or France).

== Events ==
- German poet and critic Heinrich Wilhelm von Gerstenberg begins publication of his Briefe über Merkwürdigkeiten der Litteratur in which he formulates the literary principles of Sturm und Drang.

== Works published ==
- Mark Akenside, An Ode to the Late Thomas Edwards
- John Cunningham, Poems, Chiefly Pastoral
- Isaac D'Israeli, The Literary Character
- John Freeth, The Political Songster
- Oliver Goldsmith, editor, Poems for Young Ladies, an anthology published this year, although the book states "1767"
- Francis Hopkinson, "A Psalm of Thanksgiving", English, Colonial America
- Charles Jenner, Poems
- Thomas Letchworh, "A Morning and Evening's Meditation; or, A Descant on the Times", English, Colonial America
- Henry James Pye, Beauty
- Anna Williams, Miscellanies in Prose and Verse

== Births ==
Death years link to the corresponding "[year] in poetry" article:

- January 3 - Nguyễn Du (died 1820), Vietnamese poet
- April 27 - Vasily Pushkin (died 1830), Russian poet
- October 11 - Nólsoyar Páll (lost at sea c.1808), Faroese merchant and poet
- December 3 - Robert Bloomfield (died 1823), English "ploughboy poet"
- Maharaja Chandu Lal (died 1845), Indian Urdu- and Persian-language poet and politician
- Martha Llwyd (died 1845), Welsh poet and hymnodist

== Deaths ==
Birth years link to the corresponding "[year] in poetry" article:

- September 23 - John Brown (born 1715), English clergyman, essayist and poet
- c. November - Catherine Jemmat, née Yeo (born c.1714), English memoirist and anthologist
- December 12 - Johann Christoph Gottsched (born 1700), German critic
- December 24 - James Grainger (born c.1721), Scottish-born doctor, poet and translator, of "West Indian fever" in Saint Kitts
- Robert Andrews (born 1723), English Presbyterian minister, poet and translator, insane
- Hazin Lahiji (born 1692), Persian poet and scholar

== See also ==
- Poetry
- List of years in poetry
