= Mohedano =

Mohedano is a surname and a given name. Notable people with the name include:

Surname:

- Andrés García Mohedano (born 1996), Spanish professional footballer
- Antonio Mohedano (1561–1625), Spanish painter of the Renaissance period
- David Gil Mohedano (born 1994), Spanish professional footballer
- Elena Congost Mohedano (born 1987), T12/B2 track and field athlete from Spain
- Lourdes Mohedano (born 1995), Spanish group rhythmic gymnast
- Oriol Mohedano, Spanish football manager/head coach
- Rafael Rodríguez Mohedano (1725–1787), Spanish Franciscan, historian and writer

Given name:

- José María Mohedano Fuertes (born 1948), Spanish lawyer and politician
- Rocio Mohedano Jurado (1943–2006), Spanish singer and actress
