= 1823 in poetry =

Nationality words link to articles with information on the nation's poetry or literature (for instance, Irish or France).

== Events ==
- February – A monument to Scottish poet Robert Burns (died 1796) is opened in Alloway.
- May 23 – Russian writer Alexander Pushkin begins work on his verse novel Eugene Onegin.
- July – William Wentworth completes his poem "Australasia" which is published in the UK as a pamphlet, the first book of verse composed by a native-born Australian poet.
- December – English poet Samuel Taylor Coleridge, suffering from opium addiction, takes up residence at No. 3, The Grove, Highgate, London, a house owned by Dr. James Gillman.
- December 23 – Clement Clarke Moore's poem "A Visit from St. Nicholas", also known as "Twas the Night Before Christmas" from its first line, is first published (anonymously) in the Troy, New York, Sentinel, and then other newspapers this year and is largely responsible for the American conception of the character he introduces named as "Santa Claus" (attributed to various authors, including Major Henry Beekman Livingston, but most often now to Moore).

== Works published in English ==
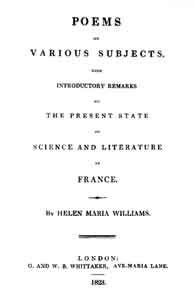
Title page of Poems on Various Subjects: With Introductory Remarks on the Present State of Science and Literature in France by Helen Maria Williams (London: Whittaker), published this year

- Robert Bloomfield, Hazelwood Hall, verse drama
- William Lisle Bowles, Ellen Gray; or, The Dead Maiden's Curse
- Edward Lytton Bulwer (later Bulwer-Lytton), Delmour; or, A Tale of a Sylphid, and Other Poems
- Lord Byron:
  - Don Juan:
    - July 15 – Cantos VI, VII, VIII, with a Preface, were published
    - August 29 – Cantos IX, X, XI were published
    - December 17 – Cantos XII, XIII, XIV
  - The Island; or, Christian and His Comrades
- Sir Aubrey de Vere, The Duke of Mercia; The Lamentation of Ireland; and Other Poems
- Ebenezer Elliott, Love
- Felicia Dorothea Hemans:
  - The Siege of Valencia; The Last Constantine; with Other Poems
  - The Vespers of Palermo: A tragedy, verse drama
- Mary Howitt and William Howitt, The Forest Minstrel, and Other Poems
- Leigh Hunt, Ultara Crepidarius, a satire on William Gifford
- Charles Lloyd, Poems
- J. G. Lockhart, Ancient Spanish Ballads, Historical and Romantic
- Robert Millhouse, Blossoms, Being a selection of sonnets.
- Thomas Moore, The Loves of the Angels
- Bryan Waller Procter, pen name "Barry Cornwall", The Flood of Thessaly, The Girl of Provence, and Other Poems
- Winthrop Mackworth Praed, Lillian
- Percy Bysshe Shelley, Poetical Pieces by the Late Percy Bysshe Shelley
- Helen Maria Williams, Poems on Various Subjects

=== United States ===
- George Bancroft, Poems
- Fitz-Greene Halleck, "Alnwick Castle", set in Scotland and contrasts the romantic past with the "bank-note-world" of the present
- James McHenry, Waltham, patriotic poem in three cantos; about George Washington at Valley Forge
- Clement Clarke Moore, "A Visit from St. Nicholas"
- Edward Coote Pinkney, Rudolph, a Byronic narrative poem (later included in Poems 1825)

== Works published in other languages ==
- Alphonse de Lamartine, Nouvelles méditations poétiques, France
- Heinrich Heine, Lyrisches Intermezzo, Germany
- Adam Mickiewicz, Grażyna, an epic poem featuring a Lithuanian prince and a fourteenth-century castle, Poland
- Wilhelm Müller, Wanderlieder von Wilhelm Müller: Die Winterreise. In 12 Liedern (published in the almanack Urania: Taschenbuch auf das Jahr 1823), Germany
- Dionysios Solomos, Hymn to Freedom, which becomes the Greek National Anthem, Greece

== Births ==
Death years link to the corresponding "[year] in poetry" article:

- January 1 – Sándor Petőfi (probably killed in action 1849), Hungarian
- March 26 – Margaret Miller Davidson (died 1838), American
- April 19 – Anna Laetitia Waring (died 1910), Welsh-born poet writing in English
- July 23 – Coventry Patmore (died 1896), English
- October 6 – George Henry Boker (died 1890), American
- November 26 – James Mathewes Legaré (died 1859), American
- December 24 – William Brighty Rands (died 1882), English writer and author of nursery rhymes

== Deaths ==
Birth years link to the corresponding "[year] in poetry" article:

- February 21 – Charles Wolfe (born 1791), Irish
- June 19 – William Combe (born 1742), English miscellaneous writer
- August 19 – Robert Bloomfield (born 1766), English "ploughboy poet"
- September 29 – George Beattie (born 1786), Scottish
- November 1 – Heinrich Wilhelm von Gerstenberg (born 1737), German poet and critic
- date not known:
  - Ōta Nanpo 大田南畝, the most used pen name of Ōta Tan, whose other pen names include Yomo no Akara, Yomo Sanjin, Kyōkaen, and Shokusanjin 蜀山人 (born 1749), Japanese late Edo-period poet and fiction writer
  - Rebekah Carmichael (born 1766?), British

== See also ==
- Poetry
- List of years in poetry
- List of years in literature
- 19th century in literature
- 19th century in poetry
- Romantic poetry
- Golden Age of Russian Poetry (1800–1850)
- Weimar Classicism period in Germany, commonly considered to have begun in 1788 and to have ended either in 1805, with the death of Friedrich Schiller, or 1832, with the death of Goethe
- List of poets
