= Travels Through France and Italy =

1766 travel book by Tobias Smollett

Travels through France and Italy
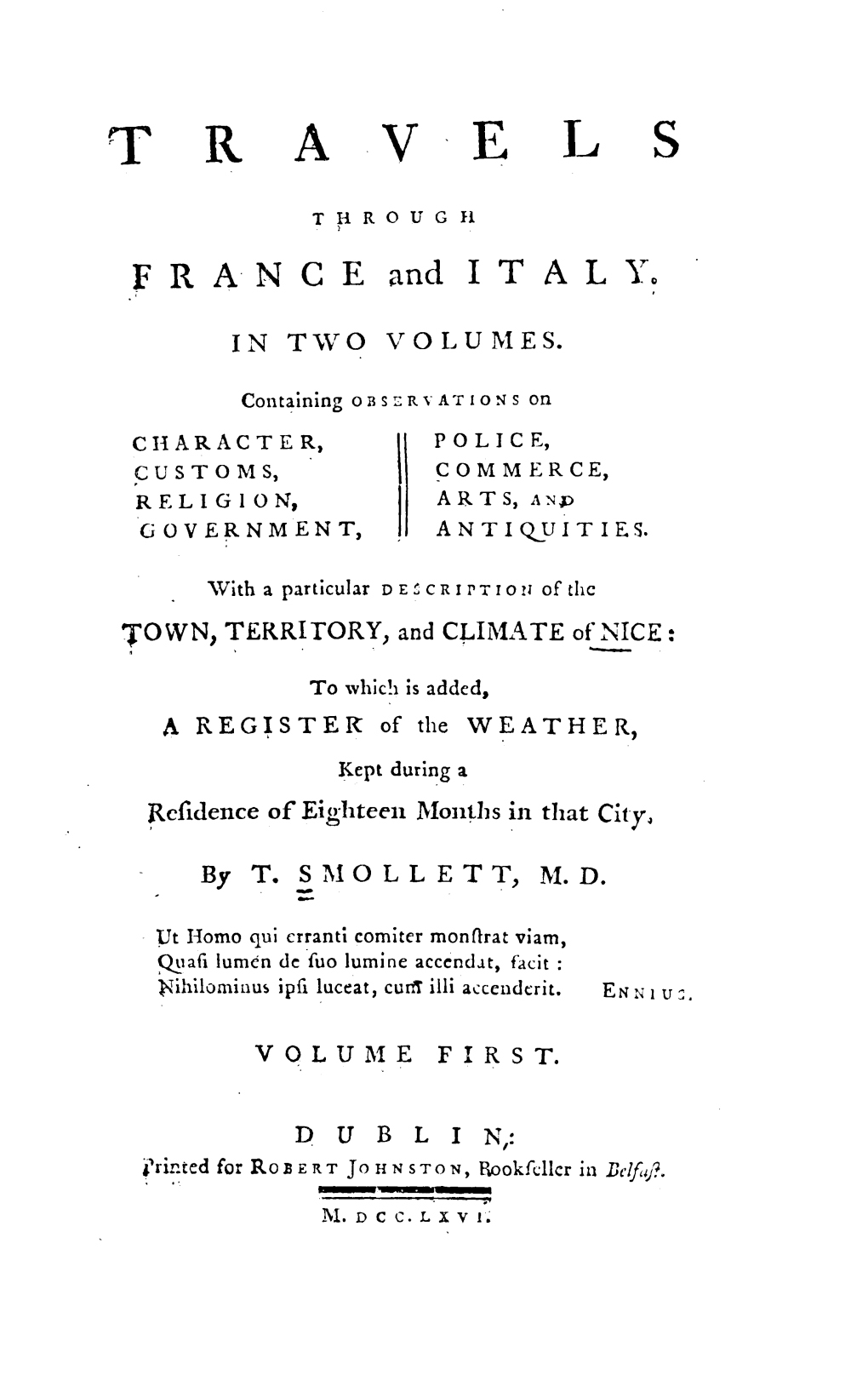
- Title page of a pirate edition published in Dublin the same year as the original edition.
- Author: Tobias George Smollett
- Original title: Travels through France and Italy
- Translator: André Fayot
- Language: English
- Genre: Travel narrative in epistolary form
- Publisher: B. Baldwin, Paternoster Row
- Publication date: 8 May 1766
- Publication place: Scotland
- Pages: 395 (1994 French edition)
- ISBN: 2-7143-0505-9
- Preceded by: A Complete History of England (1765)
- Followed by: The History and Adventures of an Atom (1769)

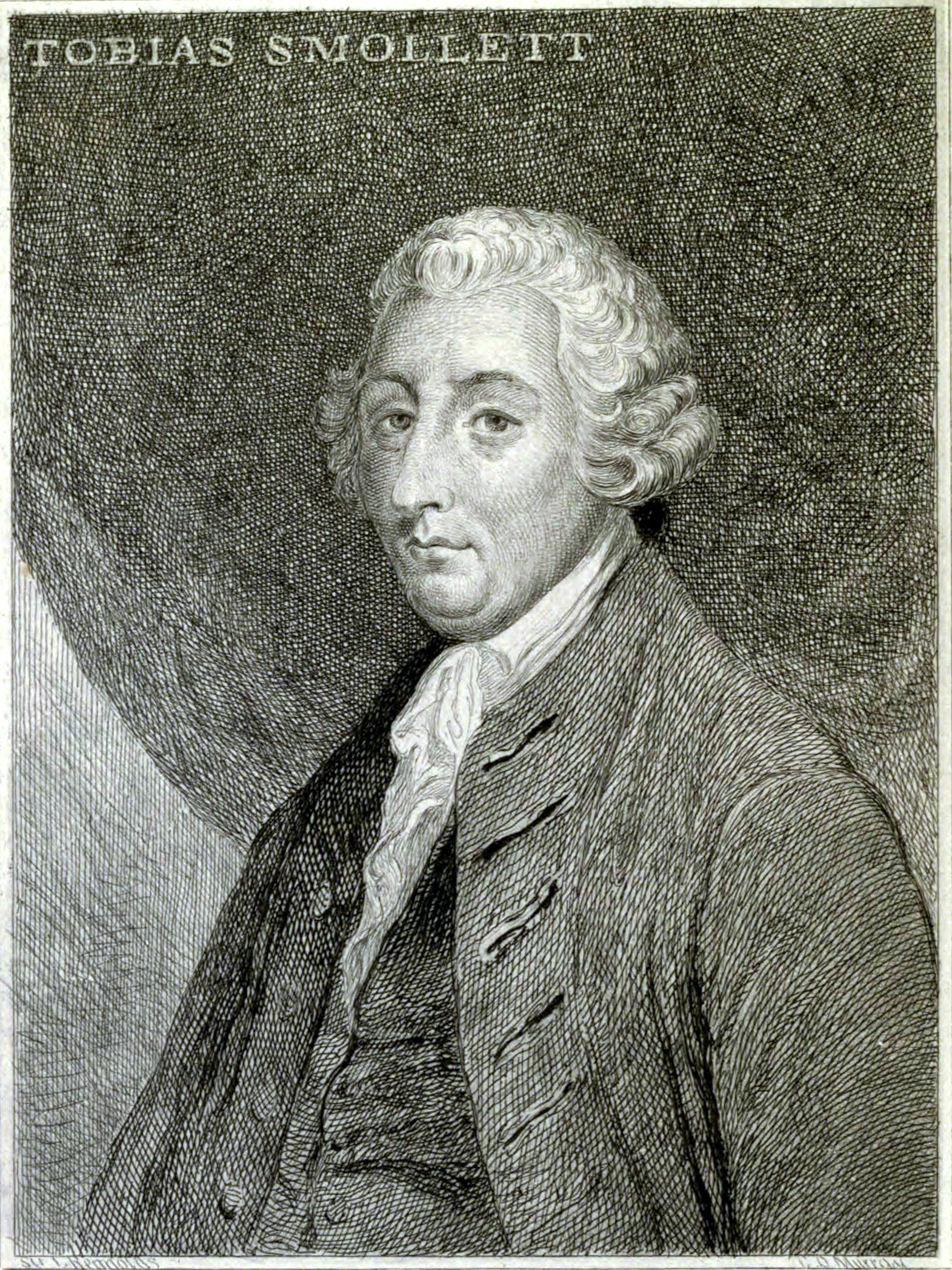
Portrait of Tobias Smollett.

Travels through France and Italy is a travel book by the Scottish author Tobias Smollett, published in two volumes on 8 May 1766.

The work is written in the form of a series of letters originated in a journey that Smollett, accompanied by his wife, undertook from June 1763 to July 1765, primarily in France but also including a two-month excursion into Italy. The principal destination was Nice, chosen for its reputedly beneficial climate for sufferers of pulmonary complaints. During the journey, Smollett corresponded regularly with acquaintances in Britain; on his return, he revised these letters, supplementing them with historical and archaeological information drawn from guidebooks, and published the result as Travels through France and Italy.

The book was an immediate commercial success, aided by Smollett's existing notoriety as a novelist and controversial journalist. Its frequently acerbic tone, which combined sharp observation with outspoken criticism of French and Italian manners, hygiene, cuisine, religion and society, appealed to a British readership still influenced by the patriotic fervour and Francophobia that followed victory in the Seven Years' War (1756–1763).

The success proved short-lived. In 1768 Laurence Sterne published A Sentimental Journey Through France and Italy, which presented a far more affectionate view of France and explicitly ridiculed Smollett under the name "Smelfungus". Sterne's immense popularity rapidly eclipsed Smollett's work in public favour, and the latter came to be regarded as the archetype of the splenetic, ill-tempered traveller. Modern scholarship views Travels through France and Italy as a significant example of late 18th-century travel literature. Although its satirical and often prejudiced tone remains conspicuous, critics recognise the acuity of many of Smollett's observations, the vigour of his prose, and the work's importance as a precursor to the epistolary structure he would later perfect in his final novel, The Expedition of Humphry Clinker (1771). The book is also credited with helping to popularise the French Riviera among British travellers; Smollett's extended residence in Nice and his detailed descriptions of the town and its surroundings contributed to its emergence as a fashionable destination, leading later writers to describe him as the "discoverer" or "inventor" of the Côte d’Azur.

== Genesis ==
According to Viviès, who in 1999 questioned the significance of the genre chosen by Smollett,

The 18th century, a pivotal era in English literature that saw the birth and flourishing of the novel, was also the golden age of the travel narrative. The great authors—James Boswell, Samuel Johnson, Laurence Sterne and Tobias Smollett—never ceased leafing through the pages of the book of the world while simultaneously elaborating their discourse within the world of books. At the point of encounter between seeing and knowing, between inventory and invention, these novels and travel narratives sketch out a space in which all literary genres exchange and reinvent forms whose plasticity and modernity contemporary critical theory enables us to fully grasp.

=== Biographical experiences ===
Smollett travelled on the continent six times but, unlike many 18th-century writers such as Addison, Gray, Walpole, Sterne, Gibbon and Hume, all of whom recorded their observations in detail, Smollett left very few traces of his life on those then-distant lands in his private correspondence. Of the 108 letters included in the most recent edition, only seven complete letters and one fragment are devoted to them. By contrast, the journey and stay of 1763–1765 did not suffer the same fate; this is doubtless because the work is intimately linked to its author's personal life. At the age of forty-two, ill, exhausted by his literary and political battles, and having been forced in February 1763 to cease publication of the weekly The Briton amid agitation and insults, where he had supported the unpopular policy of Lord Bute, Smollett, like his wife, became inconsolable at the loss of Elizabeth, their only child, a fifteen-year-old girl affectionately nicknamed Little Boss.

Leaving seemed necessary to revive their bodies, distance their worries, and soften the grief that overwhelmed them. Asthmatic, tubercular, and hypochondriac, Smollett hoped that the Mediterranean sun and the dryness of the air would restore his difficult breathing and that bathing (despite his earlier attacks on the waters of Bath in An Essay on the External Use of Water) would restore tone to his weakened organism, two objectives that were successfully achieved, since he returned in much better health. The discovery of Nice, then excluded from the Grand Tour (Note: The expression "Grand Tour" was coined by Richard Lassels in 1679 in his An Italian Voyage. It was a prescribed journey, sometimes for health reasons but more often for cultural purposes; prescribed also because its itinerary was fixed in advance, with Greece, Italy, France, and sometimes Germany and Russia as the favoured destinations.) that took young aristocrats fresh from their classical studies through France and Italy, a small town of approximately 12,000 inhabitants according to the traveller's calculations, came about through the recommendation of a physician he met by chance, who had praised its climatic virtues for having cured his own severe bronchial problems.

Furthermore, Mrs Anne Smollett "never ceased begging her husband insistently to take her away from a country where every object served to nourish her grief".

=== Financial situation ===
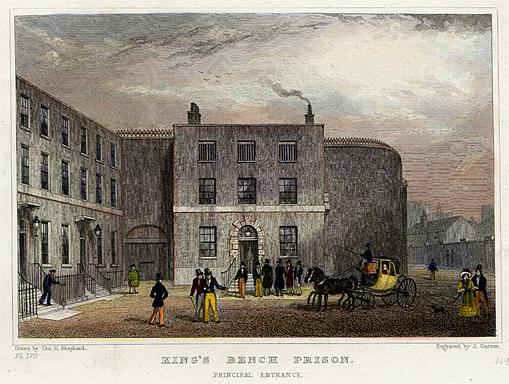
The entrance to King's Bench Prison c. 1828, by Thomas H. Shepherd.

Thomas Seccombe points out that Smollett, who had neither mentor, pension, inheritance nor property of any kind, was one of the first English writers to earn his living as an adult entirely by his pen. Ten years after arriving in London, he prided himself on spending lavishly and "protecting" a crowd of so-called Grub Street writers, that is, the less fortunate or less talented, (Note: According to Samuel Johnson’s Dictionary, who had lived there early in his career, the term originally meant "originally the name of a street... much inhabited by writers of small histories, dictionaries, and temporary poems, whence any mean production is called grubstreet". The modern image of the street was popularised by Alexander Pope in his Dunciad. The street no longer exists, but "Grub Street" is still used to describe writers producing low-quality literature.) with little regard for his own accounts. This forced him to borrow repeatedly, as the six or seven hundred pounds sterling his writings brought him annually were not enough to sustain this lavish daily life.

Driven by the need to produce through forced nights, Smollett edited the literary review The Critical Review, the general-interest magazine The British Magazine, and the political weekly The Briton. His denunciatory opinions brought him trouble, in particular a three-month imprisonment from November 1760 to February 1761 in King's Bench Prison, together with a fine of £100, a considerable sum at the time. A subsequent quarrel with his former friend John Wilkes added further charges and vexations that finally undermined both his physical and mental equilibrium. To these were added the illness of the wife he adored and, as the final blow, the death of the couple's beloved child.

=== Trip abroad ===
Besides the other circumstances, the doctors’ prescription had been categorical: Smollett had to head south to a dry and sunny climate. However, the novelist also set off with the firm intention of making financial profit from his wanderings, hence the long descriptive letters written at every stage and addressed to his doctor friends or other acquaintances, practically without distance, with scenes and conversations taken live. The planned destination was Montpellier, regarded as the best resort in Southern Europe, a route that the peace of 1763 had just reopened. Smollett had already travelled several times aboard ships of the Royal Navy as a naval surgeon. His experiences, partly reused in The Adventures of Roderick Random, had been harsh: storms, punishments, sights of war, especially the expedition to Cartagena. He was therefore hardly predisposed to view the world with a neutral eye or to describe it in rosy terms; his state of mind was not that of a passing holidaymaker ready to appreciate at once the novelty of sounds, scents and tastes. Cheerful and jovial in his youth, he had gradually changed, to the point that, on his return to Scotland in 1755, his mother had struggled to recognise him. The same fiery temperament remained, but now prone to exasperation, rather grumpy, sardonic and critical. Like Mr Jacob Brattle in Anthony Trollope’s The Vicar of Bulhampton, Smollett tended to brood over the ills with which fortune had afflicted him, finding himself in a state that medicine described as splenetic. For him, the Grand Tour therefore presented itself not as a privilege but as a necessary chore and, he hoped, perhaps lucrative, but whose discomforts irritated him, which made him from the outset, as Thomas Seccombe writes, an advocatus diaboli quite ready to appreciate nothing.

Nevertheless, the magic of travel is not entirely absent from the book; the Maison Carrée in Nîmes or the Pont du Gard are described with enthusiasm; the passage recounting the entry into the Eternal City, or the detail of the al fresco meals discussed in the coach, are not far from panegyric. Most of Smollett's correspondents belonged to the medical profession and were above all Scottish; among them were John Armstrong, William Hunter, George Macaulay and John Moore, an authority on travel in Europe and author of the novel Zeluco. This creates in Smollett a tendency to dwell on health problems, symptoms and humours, as Fielding had done regarding his dropsy in Journal of a Voyage to Lisbon. Thus, and in many other ways, Travels through France and Italy provides numerous keys to understanding its author's personality: it is the work of a scholar, an observer of history and geography, a lover of etymology who helped lexicalise many foreign terms into the English language.

== Text ==
The first edition of Travels through France and Italy was published on 8 May 1766 by R. Baldwin of Paternoster Row in London; it consisted of two leather-bound volumes in octavo format, sold for ten shillings. Modern editions generally reproduce the text of the Clarendon edition published in November 1979, incorporating all the corrections made by Smollett after his return, as they appear in his manuscript deposited at the British Library under the reference C. 45. D. 20. 21. The variants resulting from these corrections are explained in the notes of the Clarendon edition.

== Itinerary and commentary ==
Smollett presents himself as the narrator, using the first-person narrative, singular or plural, depending on whether he is referring to himself or also to his entourage. Thus, his dispatches belong to three genres: epistolary, travel narrative and autobiographical, the latter characteristic being relatively emphasised, as the comments reveal his moods and gradually sketch a portrait of the man. On the other hand, he maintains complete anonymity regarding the recipients of his letters, who therefore remain unknown.

=== Recipients and sequence of letters ===
The letters are not addressed to named recipients; men or women, they are represented only by their courtesy title, which may be "Doctor", "Sir" or "Madam", followed or not by initials, most often by asterisks. Nothing in the body of each missive can reveal their identity, the text being intended to be entirely and solely descriptive. Generally, the chronological sequence is respected, although some letters are backdated, such as letter XV, which is seventeen days earlier than letter XIV, or letter XXXVIII, written in Turin on 18 March 1765, whereas the previous one comes from Nice on 2 April. Their frequency varies: monthly at the beginning, sometimes daily in Paris, Lyon and Montpellier, then irregular and, in Nice, often spaced out or conversely concentrated, sometimes twice a day. The letters end without any personal touch with "Adieu" or the conventional polite formulas "Your humble servant" or "Yours &c.", occasionally "Yours sincerely", very rarely, as in letter XXIX, "Your servant and friend", or, in the exceptional case of letter XXX, although addressed to a man, "Yours, most affectionately", without it being really possible to establish a hierarchy of closeness between the writer and the various correspondents. Rarely, the first sentence acknowledges a reply (true or not) received after the last dispatch. This is probably a device intended to introduce a new subject, as when in letter XXVIII Smollett writes: "You ask me to be more precise about what I saw in Florence, and I shall obey the injunction". Finally, one letter seems intended for Smollett himself, the one in which he describes the journey to Turin under the harshest conditions; considering his illness and the fragility of his constitution, it is possible that he incorporated into it a correspondence that has remained unknown.

Undoubtedly Smollett kept a copy of his letters before posting them. According to Robert E. Kelley, some of the themes addressed are repeated in personal letters sent at the same time to friends, for example on 11 July 1763 in his message to William Hunter where he complains about the holding of his trunk of books at customs, whereas the letters recounting the events are dated the 15th following and 15 August of the same year. The wording is practically identical and it is likely that the last two were copied from the first. There may, however, be differences, with certain episodes or details omitted in the passages intended for publication. Conversely, a private letter sent to Dr Reed on 3 August summarises in one sentence what the book develops into a long exposition on the backwardness of the orchards compared with those of England, the reason being attributed, even though the climate is milder, to the chronic lack of method and the disordered and clumsy ways of the local peasants, who lack the care displayed by their counterparts across the Channel. Sometimes, as in the vicinity of Nice, for the same correspondent who was an antiquities enthusiast, Smollett expands privately on the description of ruined monuments, their materials or construction techniques, whereas the book contents itself with a brief summary. There is therefore a kind of almost permanent back-and-forth between Smollett and some of his correspondents that runs parallel to the official exchanges intended for publication. Robert E. Kelley concludes that the bridges between the two currents necessarily contributed to the originality of this unusual travel narrative, since it conspicuously departs from the contemporary notion that travellers should under no circumstances resort to the autobiographical form.

=== Schedule of travels ===
- June 1763: departure from London for Boulogne-sur-Mer
- June–July: stay in Boulogne
- July: departure for Paris
- July–mid-October: stay in Paris
- 13 October: departure from Paris for the Midi
- mid-October–mid-December: stay in Montpellier and surroundings
- 13 November: departure from Montpellier for Nice
- 1764: stay in Nice
- September–November: departure from Nice, journey in Italy and return to Nice
- December 1764–July 1765: second stay in Nice
- 7 February 1765 – 18 March 1765: excursion to Turin and the Piedmontese countryside, then return to Nice
- July 1765: final departure for England.

=== Places and dates of the letters ===
The distribution by place reflects the author's movements, although many letters concerning Italy are dated from Nice, either because they were written after the fact or because Smollett kept the name of the more or less permanent base where his own mail reached him.

==== Boulogne-sur-Mer (outward) ====
- Letter I: Boulogne, 23 June 1763
- Letter II: Boulogne, 15 July 1763
- Letter III: Boulogne, 15 August 1763
- Letter IV: Boulogne, 1 September 1763
- Letter V: Boulogne, 12 September 1763

==== Paris and Lyon ====
- Letter VI: Paris, 12 October 1763
- Letter VII: Paris, 12 October 1763
- Letter VIII: Lyon, 19 October 1763

==== Montpellier ====
- Letter IX: Montpellier, 5 November 1763
- Letter X: Montpellier, 10 November 1763
- Letter XI: Montpellier, 12 November 1763

==== Nice ====
- Letter XII: Nice, 6 December 1763
- Letter XIII: Nice, 15 January 1764
- Letter XIV: Nice, 20 January 1764
- Letter XV: Nice, 3 January 1764
- Letter XVI: Nice, 2 May 1764
- Letter XVII: Nice, 2 July 1764
- Letter XVIII: Nice, 2 September 1764
- Letter XIX: Nice, 10 October 1764
- Letter XX: Nice, 22 October 1764
- Letter XXI: Nice, 10 November 1764
- Letter XXII: Nice, 10 November 1764
- Letter XXIII: Nice, 19 November 1764
- Letter XXIV: Nice, 4 January 1765
- Letter XXV: Nice, 1 January 1765 (departure for Genoa)
- Letter XXVI: Nice, 15 January 1765
- Letter XXVII: Nice, 28 January 1765 (departure for Pisa and Florence)
- Letter XXVIII: Nice, 5 February 1765
- Letter XXIX: Nice, 20 February 1765 (departure for Siena)
- Letter XXX: Nice, 28 February 1765 (in Rome)
- Letter XXXI: Nice, 5 March 1765
- Letter XXXII: Nice, 10 March 1765
- Letter XXXIII: Nice, 5 March 1765
- Letter XXXIV: Nice, 2 April 1765 (the Vatican)
- Letter XXXV: Nice, 30 March 1765 (Return, via Pisa, Florence, Turin)
- Letter XXXVI: Nice, 23 March 1765
- Letter XXXVII: Nice, 2 April 1765

==== Turin ====
- Letter XXXVIII: Turin, 18 March 1765 (Turin)

==== Aix-en-Provence and Boulogne-sur-Mer (return) ====
- Letter XXXIX: Aix-en-Provence, 10 May 1765.
- Letter XL: Boulogne-sur-Mer, 23 May 1765.
- Letter XLI: Boulogne-sur-Mer, 13 June 1765.

=== Along the stages ===
The Smolletts’ wanderings during their journey in France and Italy.

The road to Dover proved rough. Smollett rails against the inn on the Dover road: exorbitant prices, freezing rooms (iced), wretched beds that were not clean, execrable cooking, wine worthy of poison (poison wine), incompetent service, an insolent landlord, and not a drop of malt liquor. (Note: In the 18th century the term "malt liquor" (malt liquor) simply denoted a fermented drink, whereas later it came to designate a type of beer popular in the United States.)

==== Boulogne-sur-Mer ====
As soon as he arrives in Boulogne after the crossing in a cutter from Folkestone (which cost seven guineas, not counting extras), Smollett turns into a reporter, and the descriptive letters multiply. There are forty-one in all, forming four groups: Letter I describes the journey between London and Dover; then, from Letter II to Letter V, Boulogne and its inhabitants monopolise the pen, focused on the acrid stench of the place and the prevailing prejudices; from VI to XII the journey from Boulogne to Nice is covered, passing through Paris via Montreuil, Amiens, Clermont (a distance of 156 mi (251 km) (252 km (157 mi)), the last thirty-six (52 km (32 mi)) on paved roads), then Lyon, Nîmes and Montpellier; the third group, XIII to XXIV, is devoted to the city of Nice and its people; finally, the fourth set, XXV–XLI, describes the two-month excursion into Italy, followed by the return to England, where the travellers arrived in July 1765.

The comments on Boulogne occupy the whole of the four letters (II–V) that serve as an introduction to the journey to come. They familiarise the reader with the setting and reveal Smollett's resolute and effective determination not to be content with the surface of things. Boulogne, a possession of the English Crown for a short period during the reign of Henry VIII, had long been neglected by the British, represented only by three small "colonies" run respectively by nuns, Jesuits and Jacobites. A few young Englishwomen attended French convents; in all perhaps a dozen families from Great Britain were in residence. Yet some distinguished men lived there: Adam Smith, shortly after Smollett's passage; the Scottish physician John Moore; and the satirical poet Charles Churchill, who had been attacked in The Briton and had taken refuge with his friend Wilkes. The traveller Philip Thicknesse, a friend of the painter Gainsborough, and Thomas Campbell, one of the founders (with Henry Brougham) of the University of London, who had bought a house in the rue Saint-Jean, are also known to have resided in the town. Finally, the English cemetery contains many graves of illustrious figures from across the Channel: Sir Basil Montagu, Sir (Nicholas) Harris Nicolas GCMG KH, Smithson Tennant, Sir William Ouseley, Sir William Hamilton, Sir C. M. Carmichael, &c.

Smollett therefore had good reasons to linger over the town, which he describes (its medieval old quarters) like a scholar, capable of discoursing on the ancient encyclopaedist Celsus or on Hippocrates, and of discovering certain learned etymologies, such as that of wheatear ("northern wheatear") and samphire ("rock samphire"). Moreover, like the man of science he is (having studied medicine), he is meticulous in respecting the accuracy of the facts recounted, as evidenced by the corrections made in the margins of the manuscripts for the 1766 edition: the style is improved by changes of verbs, inverted constructions, topographical corrigenda. This scrupulousness runs counter to many travel guides that describe the town as "devoid of anything remarkable". Smollett pays attention to everything, reviewing smuggling, a typically French Boulogne banquet (amusing and lively); he is shocked, however (and this feeling recurs practically throughout his journey), by the lack of hygiene, the very relative cleanliness, the effluvia "worse than those of Edinburgh". (Note: The dirt and nauseating smells of Edinburgh were then well known and are described in particular in Humphry Clinker, letter from Matthew Bramble to Dr Lewis dated 18 July.)

Two incidents particularly marked this stay of almost three months: first, the intercession of the ambassador in Paris, the Earl of Hertford, (Note: Francis Seymour-Conway, Earl of Hertford, cousin of Horace Walpole, ambassador to France 1763–1765, an observer of the complexity of cultural relations between France and Great Britain in the 18th century.) which enabled Smollett to recover his books, which had been seized by customs on the charge of insulting the country's religion and sent by sea to Bordeaux; secondly, a meeting with General Paterson, an affable Scot in the service of the King of Sardinia, who later confirmed that it was indeed on the recommendation of an English physician that the climate of Nice had been preferred to that of Montpellier, "much better with respect to disorders of the breast".

==== Boulogne to Paris ====
The journey from Boulogne to Paris is undertaken without lingering. Smollett is irritated by the indifference French innkeepers show towards their customers; with the exception of two landlords who prove correct, the others seem to him afflicted with senile dementia (dementia). Paris appears to him shrunken compared with his previous visit fifteen years earlier. The apartments are dark and dirty, Versailles included (far from the legendary British comfort). As he strolls through the streets whose monuments and scenes amuse him, he forms an idea of the French character, a paradigm of depreciation, his atrabilious and grumpy mood always in full swing and his pages increasingly caustic: the Frenchman is written as devoted to impertinent curiosity, foolish vanity, gluttony and libertinage.

Such a caricature, moreover preceded by the portrait of the Frenchman obsessed with the conquest of "your wife" or, failing that, "your sister, or daughter or niece", must be placed in its historical context: England was going through a period of Francophobia constantly exacerbated by the military struggles between the two countries. Aristocrats such as Walpole, Gibbon and Chesterfield possessed the intellectual baggage to consider France from a cosmopolitan viewpoint, recognising its predominance in the concert of nations. But for dyed-in-the-wool patriots such as Hogarth or Smollett, exaggeration did not seem incongruous; on the contrary, it constituted a natural and appropriate reaction. Thus these passages are intended to flatter the prevailing prejudice as it is constantly relayed by contemporary periodicals. In his defence, Smollett, a Scot who had sworn allegiance to the British crown, felt a convinced love for his new homeland, of which distrust of France remained one of the constitutive principles. Moreover, he had already deployed his satirical verve to this effect in his play The Reprisal: or, The Tars of Old England of 1757. Furthermore, coming from a Calvinist country where, writes Seccombe, "a measure of Tartufism was a necessary condition of respectability".

His caricature perhaps reaches its heights when he sets about mocking the hairstyles of the period, at the same time revealing, by tracing their history, the extent of his erudition. He indeed takes up the ancient chroniclers who mention the crine profuso et barba demissa of the reges crinitos, that is, the last Merovingians: Neque regi aliud relinquebatur, quam ut regio tantum nomine contentus crine profuso, barba summissa ("Nothing else remained to the king but his title, his mane flowing in the wind and his long beard"). In those days, explains Smollett, long hair was the mark of the right of succession, the affirmation of the race of kings, whereas being shorn marked the slave, and even under the Carolingians shaving a prince barred him from the throne.

==== Paris to Nice ====
Smollett decides to travel post from Paris to Lyon, which takes five days and costs him 30 guineas. He chooses the longer route, via Auxerre and Dijon (330 mi (530 km)), whereas the road through Nevers and Moulins would have been quicker and cheaper. The two roads diverged from Fontainebleau, the first towards Moret and the second towards Nemours. This choice is motivated by the traveller's interest in the world of the peasantry and, in particular, the vine-growers; the spectacle of the grape harvest in Burgundy is well worth the detour. His portraits of peasants in the least fertile regions anticipate those that Arthur Young would make between 1787 and 1789 of the "gaunt emblems of famine" (gaunt emblems of famine): in fact, Smollett notes that French agriculture has remained archaic compared with the progress achieved in Great Britain.

===== Lyon =====
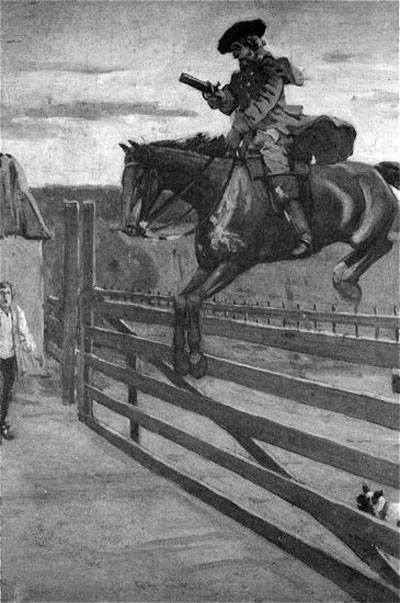
Dick Turpin and his mount at the Hornsey tollgate near London, illustration for the novel Rookwood by William Harrison Ainsworth (1849).

He admits that he is in an irritable mood, due, he justifies, to the bad weather and fear of an asthma attack. His clothes match his inner gloom: "a grey mourning frock under a wide greatcoat, a bob-wig without powder, a very large laced hat, and a meagre, wrinkled, discontented countenance.

In Lyon he hires a berline drawn by three mules with a driver named Joseph who is returning to Avignon. Joseph gives complete satisfaction by his fidelity. Yet he turns out to be a former criminal who has served his sentence and who, at the sight of a skeleton swinging in the wind on a gibbet near Valence, begins to tell his story, thus intercalated into the epistolary narrative: companion of the most dangerous highway robbers France has ever known, then their most implacable enemy, the French Dick Turpin, a Mandrin of legend. French food is hardly conducive to the traveller's digestive well-being: garlic poisons him; half-cooked small birds arouse his disgust; the quantity of dishes devoured by the people, even the apparently poorest, shocks him.

===== Nîmes and Montpellier =====
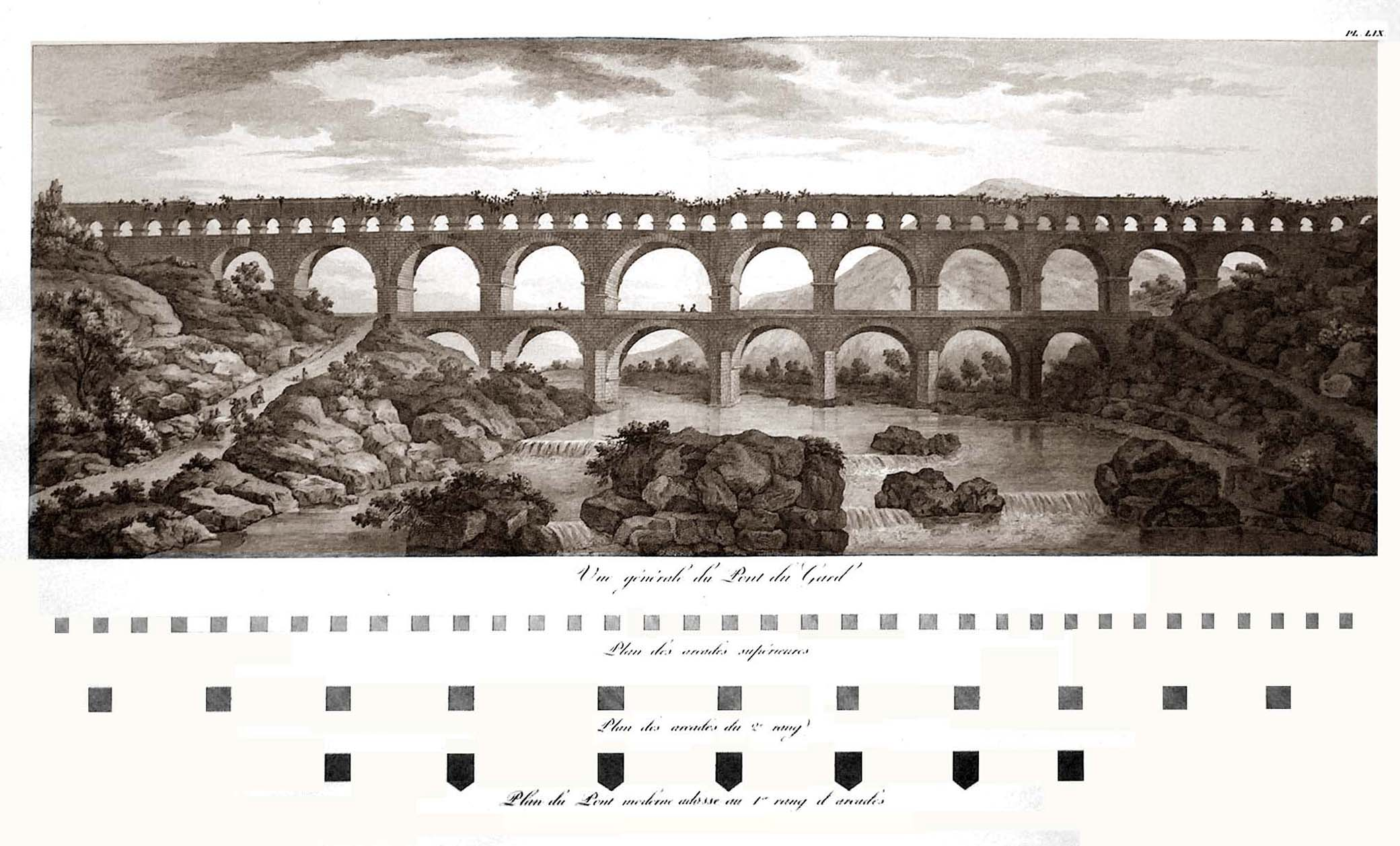
The Pont du Gard in 1804, by C.L.-Clérisseau, very degraded.

As summer approaches, Smollett's tone lightens with the improving weather. The landscapes grow more appealing, and he describes picnics by the riverside, particularly under the arches of the Pont du Gard, which he praises highly and states he would like to repeat annually. He expresses comparable admiration for the Maison Carrée. The party proceeds from Lyon toward Montpellier, a city renowned for its healthful climate, similar to Toulouse, Tours, and Turin. As a centre of medicine and law, and a stronghold of Protestantism in southern France rivaling Nîmes, it holds particular appeal for Smollett, a Scottish-trained surgeon. Montpellier had long attracted British visitors and residents, featuring prominently in accounts by travellers such as John Evelyn, Burnet, Edward and Arthur Young, and Laurence Sterne.

Smollett visits Montpellier specifically to consult the celebrated physician Dr Antoine Fizes, sometimes called "the Boerhaave of Montpellier". (Note: Herman Boerhaave, real name Boerhaaven, (31 December 1668, Voorhout near Leiden – 23 September 1738, Leiden) was a Dutch botanist, physician and humanist.) He is unimpressed by Fizes's age, appearance, and fee of six livres (approximately one écu). (Note: Many countries used the livre in Europe in the 18th century; Smollett mentions three main ones: the English pound, the French livre and the Italian lira, the latter itself varying according to whether it was Piedmontese or Genoese. For comparisons of values and exchange rates, see the notes established by André Fayot in his translation of the text.) The diagnosis of tubercules in the lungs (tuberculosis) is later judged accurate by Dr Norman Moore; the condition proves manageable, allowing Smollett several more years of life, possibly aided by settling in Nice rather than the harsher climate of Montpellier.

To cross the Rhône, the travellers could have detoured north via Avignon or used the pontoon bridge between Beaucaire and Tarascon. They instead proceed in mid-November via Orgon, Brignoles, and Le Muy, reaching the Mediterranean Sea at Fréjus. The stop at Le Muy is marred by a lengthy dispute with the innkeeper-postmaster over payment for a post-chaise amid cold and slushy conditions. Despite involvement of the consul, the party is left temporarily without mules or postilion; Smollett eventually concedes and later describes the episode as a "mortification".

===== Nice =====
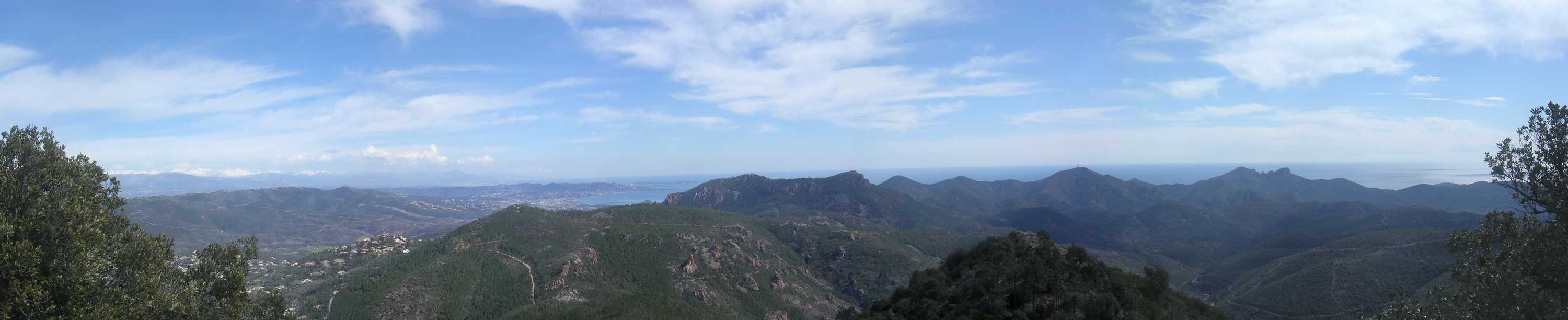
Panorama of the Estérel.

After crossing the Var, the sunshine, the outlines of the Estérel, the neat arrangement of the village of Cannes and the first views of Nice improve Smollett's mood. He describes the illuminated coast from Antibes to Lerici and writes:

When I stand upon the rampart, and look round me, I can scarce help thinking myself enchanted. The small extent of country which I see, is all cultivated like a garden. Indeed, the plain presents nothing but gardens, full of green trees, loaded with oranges, lemons, citrons, and bergamots, which make a delightful appearance. If you examine them more nearly, you will find plantations of green pease ready to gather; all sorts of sallading, and pot-herbs, in perfection; and plats of roses, carnations, ranunculas, anemonies, and daffodils, blowing in full glory, with such beauty, vigour, and perfume, as no flower in England ever exhibited.

Smollett initially plans a monograph on the natural history, topography, and ancient monuments of the region, particularly Nice. He ultimately abandons the project, judging his sources inadequate. (Note: A quarter of Smollett's original material would embarrass a Guide builder of more recent pattern.)

Letter XV includes reflections on the duel, a topic addressed by several 18th-century writers, including Boswell, Johnson, and Fielding in Tom Jones. Smollett recounts an anecdote involving General Oglethorpe, who in 1716 avoided a duel with Prince Eugene by responding wittily to wine being splashed in his face, turning the incident into a jest.

Nice has an active harbour that Smollett frequently visits, drawn by his naval background as surgeon's mate aboard HMS Cumberland. He observes galleys guarded by the naval police of His Sardinian Majesty. The presence of a British subject among the rowers evokes "horror and compassion"; learning that some rowers are volunteers prompts reflections on human hardship. On the return journey, in letter XXXIX dated 10 May 1765 from Aix-en-Provence, he offers more measured observations on galley conditions during a visit to Marseille.

The gallies, to the number of eight or nine, are moored with their sterns to one part of the wharf, and the slaves are permitted to work for their own benefit at their respective occupations, in little shops or booths, which they rent for a trifle. There you see tradesmen of all kinds sitting at work, chained by one foot, shoe-makers, taylors, silversmiths, watch and clock-makers, barbers, stocking-weavers, jewellers, pattern-drawers, scriveners, booksellers, cutlers, and all manner of shop-keepers. They pay about two sols a day to the king for this indulgence; live well and look jolly; and can afford to sell their goods and labour much cheaper than other dealers and tradesmen. At night, however, they are obliged to lie aboard.

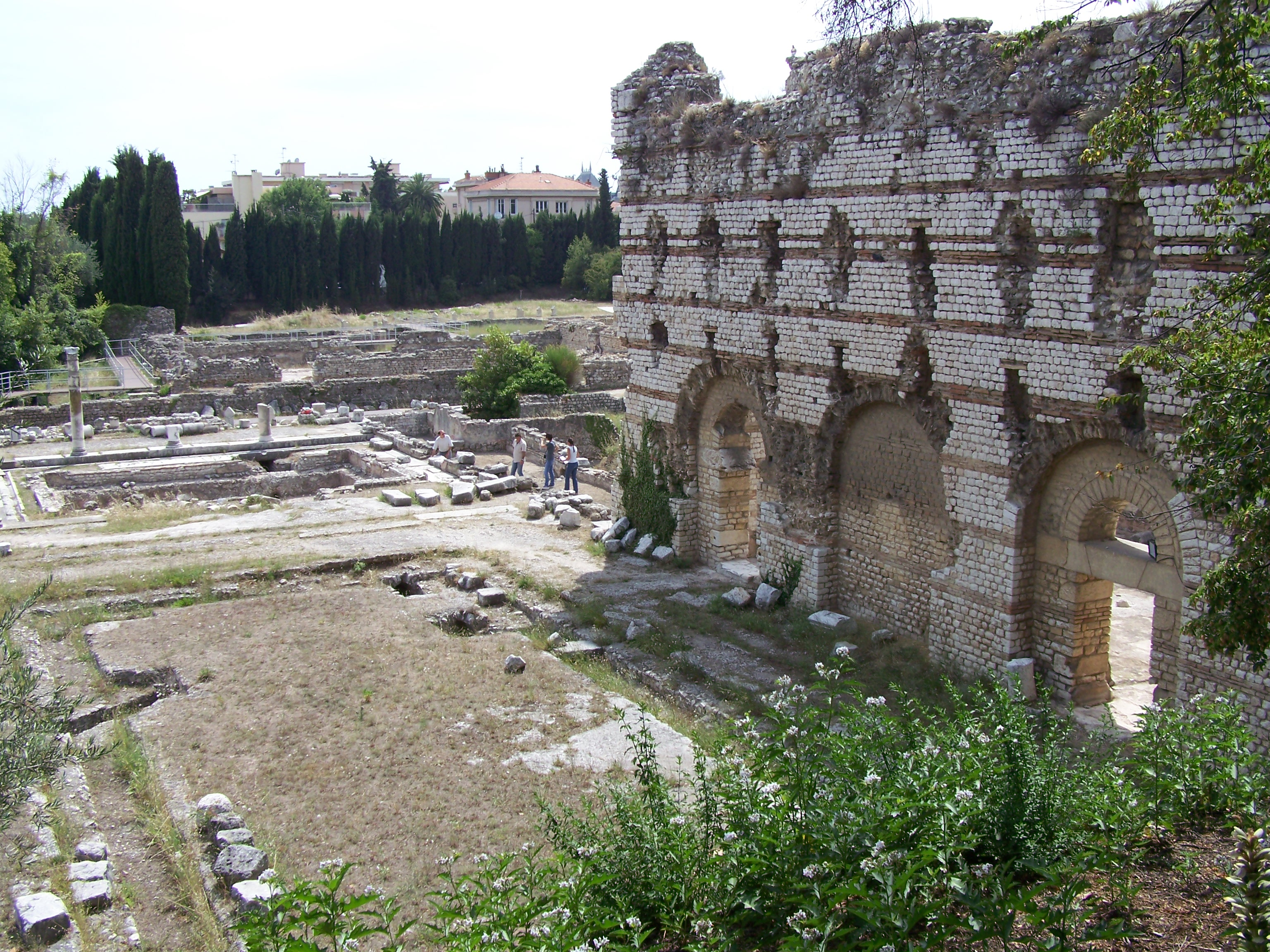
Roman baths at Cimiez.

Other topics during the stay in Nice include the Roman remains at Cimiez (which Smollett terms "Cemenelion"), the local nobility, and their customs. The travellers later depart for an autumn visit to Florence and Rome, planning to return to Nice for winter.

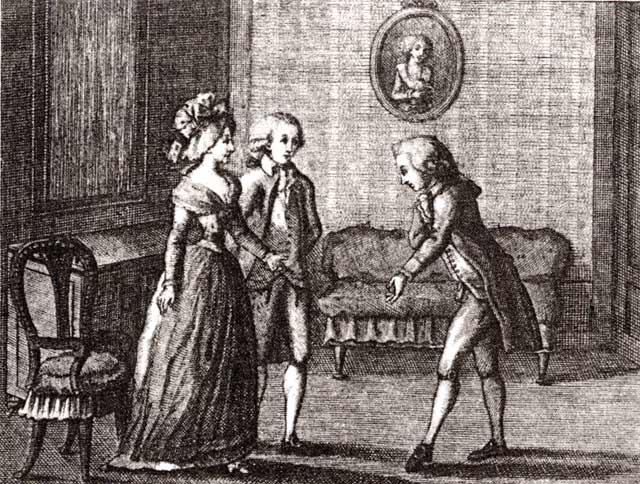
Luigi Ponelato, Il cicisbeo, engraving illustrating Carlo Goldoni's opera of the same name, 1790.

Smollett discusses the Italian practice of sigisbeatura (cicisbeism), in which a cicisbeo or cavalier servente publicly accompanies a married woman. Though mocked by contemporaries such as Giuseppe Parini, the custom receives extended treatment from Smollett, one of the earliest English-language commentators on it.

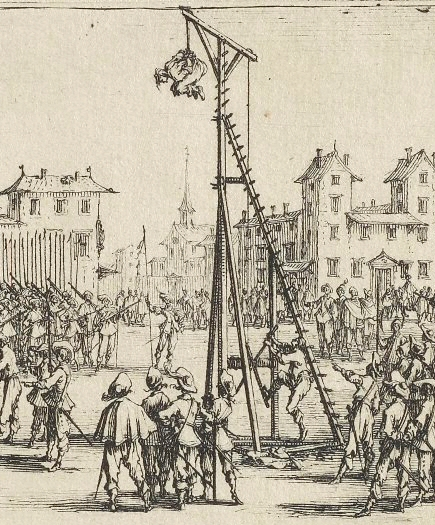
The strappado, etching by Jacques Callot (1633).

He also describes the strappado punishment, comparing it unfavourably to procedures of the Inquisition. Additional topics include the market, bird hunting, silkworm rearing, fishing for sardine and tuna, olive cultivation and oil production, temperature recordings using alcohol and mercury thermometers, and local festivals, which prompt a digression on Roman feriae.

=== Italy ===
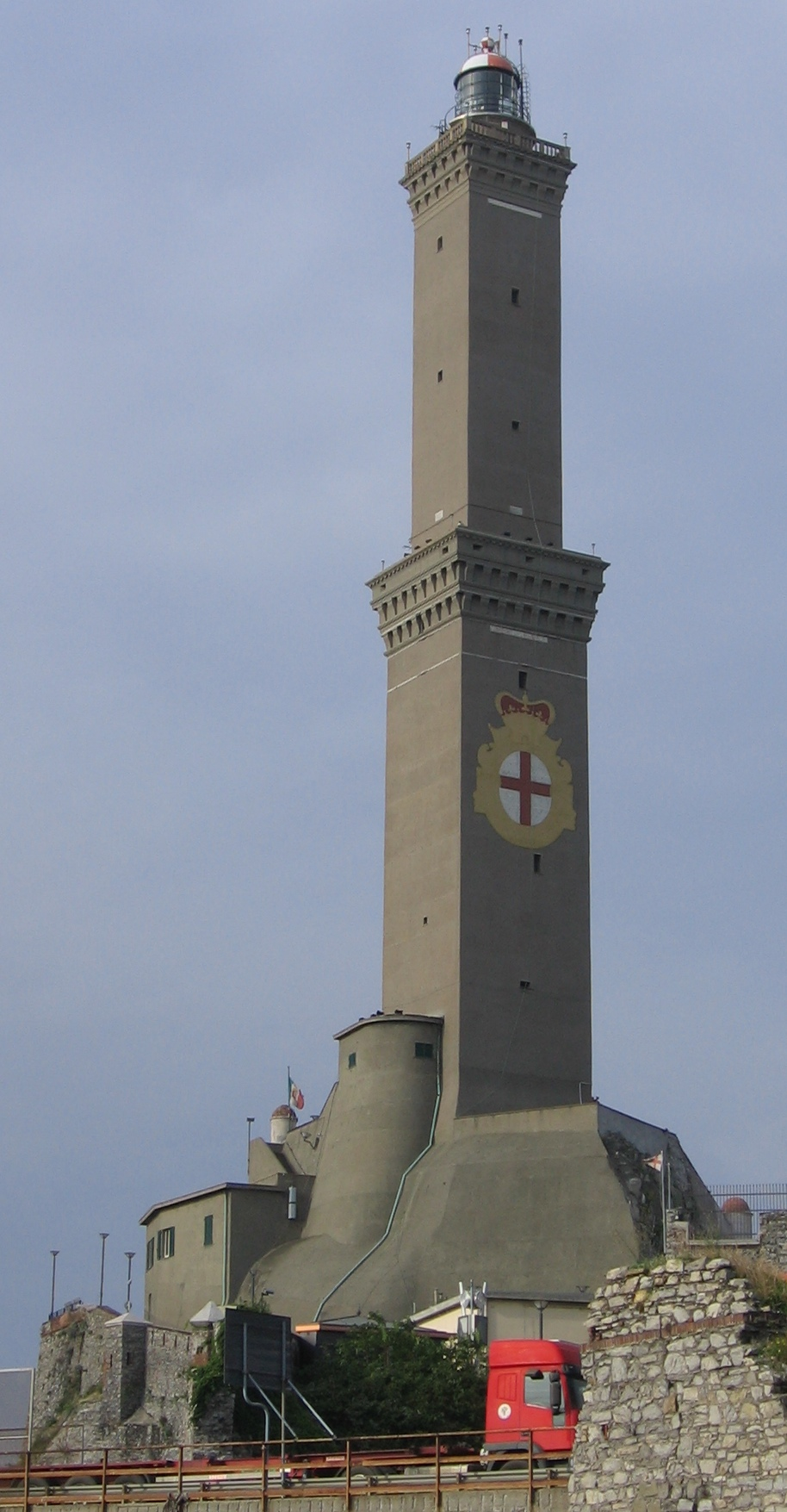
The Lighthouse of Genoa.

Rather than travel by road, Smollett opts for the sea route to Livorno (then known to the English as Leghorn). Several vessels are available, including the felucca, the tartane (used by Addison from Marseille in December 1699), and the gondola. He selects a gondola with four rowers and a steersman for nine sequins, equivalent to four and a half louis (a relatively high fare, given that one louis was approximately equal to one pound sterling). After encountering some difficulties off Monaco, San Remo, Noli, and other points, the party reaches Livorno. From there they proceed to Genoa, where they ascend the 172 steps to the first terrace of the Lighthouse of Genoa, rebuilt in 1543 on a 40 m (130 ft) rock and standing 117 m (384 ft) above sea level.

==== Genoa ====
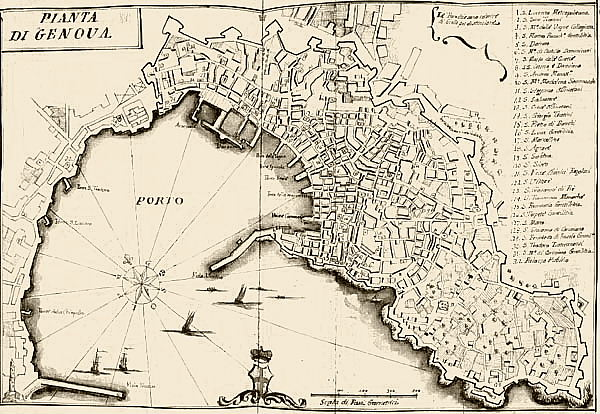
The port of Genoa in the 18th century.

Smollett arrives in Genoa during a period of political sensitivity for the republic. On 5 December 1746, during the War of the Austrian Succession, an uprising led by the young Giovan Battista Perasso (known as Balilla) had expelled the Austro-Sardinian forces. Less than two decades later, in 1768, Genoa would cede its rights over Corsica (which had functioned as the independent Corsican Republic under Pasquale Paoli since 1755) to France under the Treaty of Versailles.

Smollett portrays the Genoese aristocracy as impoverished and reclusive within their marble palaces, noting: "If a Genoese gentleman gives an entertainment once a quarter, he is said to live on the fragments all the rest of the year."

He contrasts their frugality favourably with French extravagance on clothing and food, crediting it with enabling the construction of churches and palaces that demonstrate taste and piety. However, he criticises the local custom of painting palace façades along the Strada Balbi and Strada Nuova, describing the effect as poor.

Although Smollett spends only a week in Genoa, he gathers extensive information on the city's history, architecture, art, trade, and finances. He examines the harbours for their potential to accommodate British warships and expresses concern over the Austrian withdrawal, suggesting the republic would benefit from a strong protector. He warns that reliance on France would harm Genoese interests. The following year, facing bankruptcy and unable to suppress the Corsican revolt, Doge Francesco Maria Della Rovere signed the Treaty of Versailles (1768), transferring suzerainty to France. French forces under Choiseul defeated Paoli at the Battle of Ponte Novu on 9 May 1769, and Corsica was formally annexed to France on 15 August 1769, the day Napoleon Bonaparte was born.

==== Pisa, Florence and Tuscany ====
Smollett gathers extensive information during his week in Genoa, supplementing personal observations with books carried from England or acquired locally. In a private letter dated 11 July 1763 to Lord Hertford, he lists the contents of a missing trunk, including multi-volume histories of England and the ancient world, editions of Voltaire, his own works, Shakespeare, Congreve, Homer, Sophocles, Virgil, Horace, Juvenal, Tibullus, Don Quixote in Spanish and English translation, the Critical Review, five dictionaries (Greek, Latin, French, Italian, Spanish), and various comedies and pamphlets.

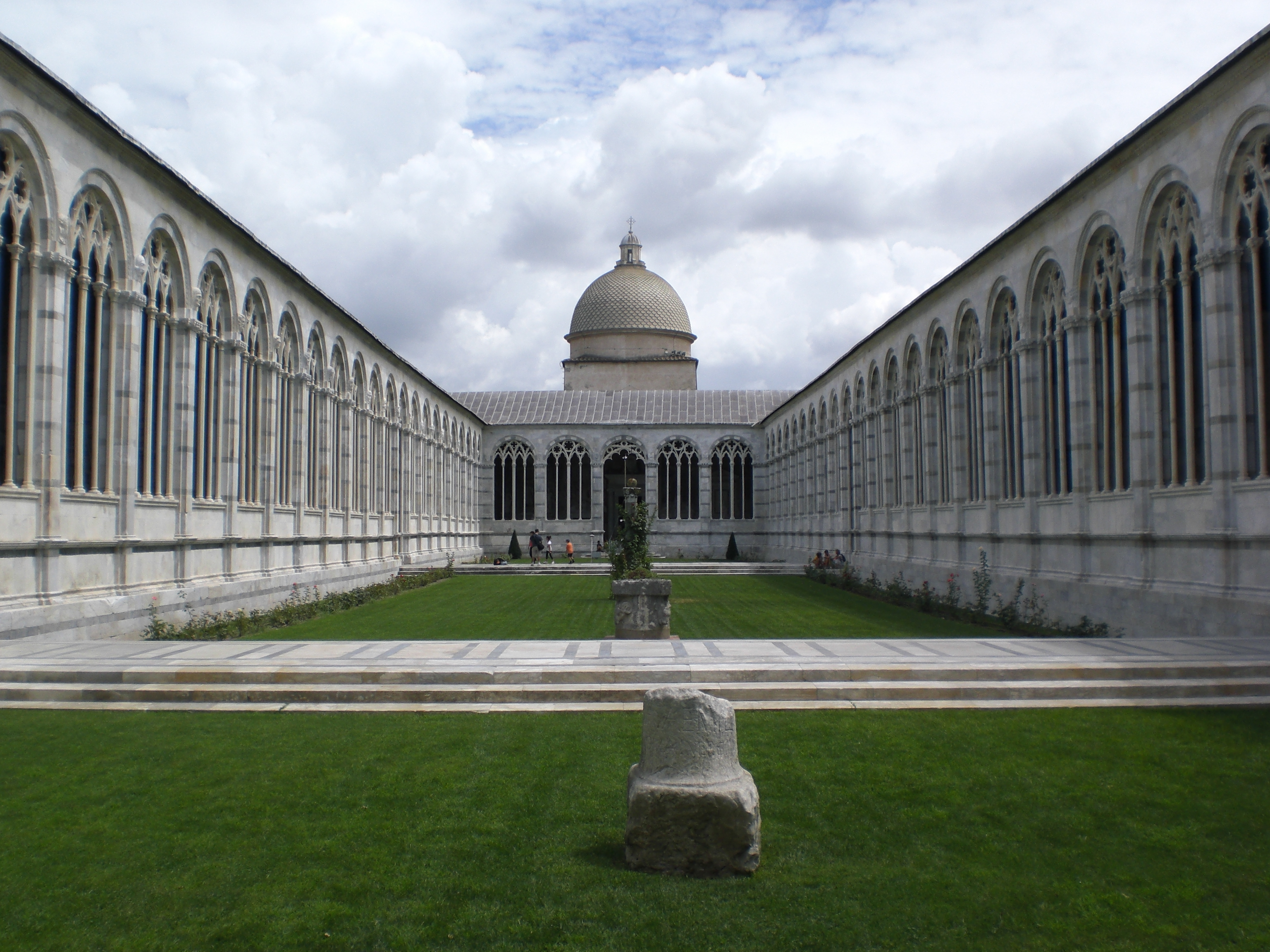
Camposanto Monumentale, Pisa.

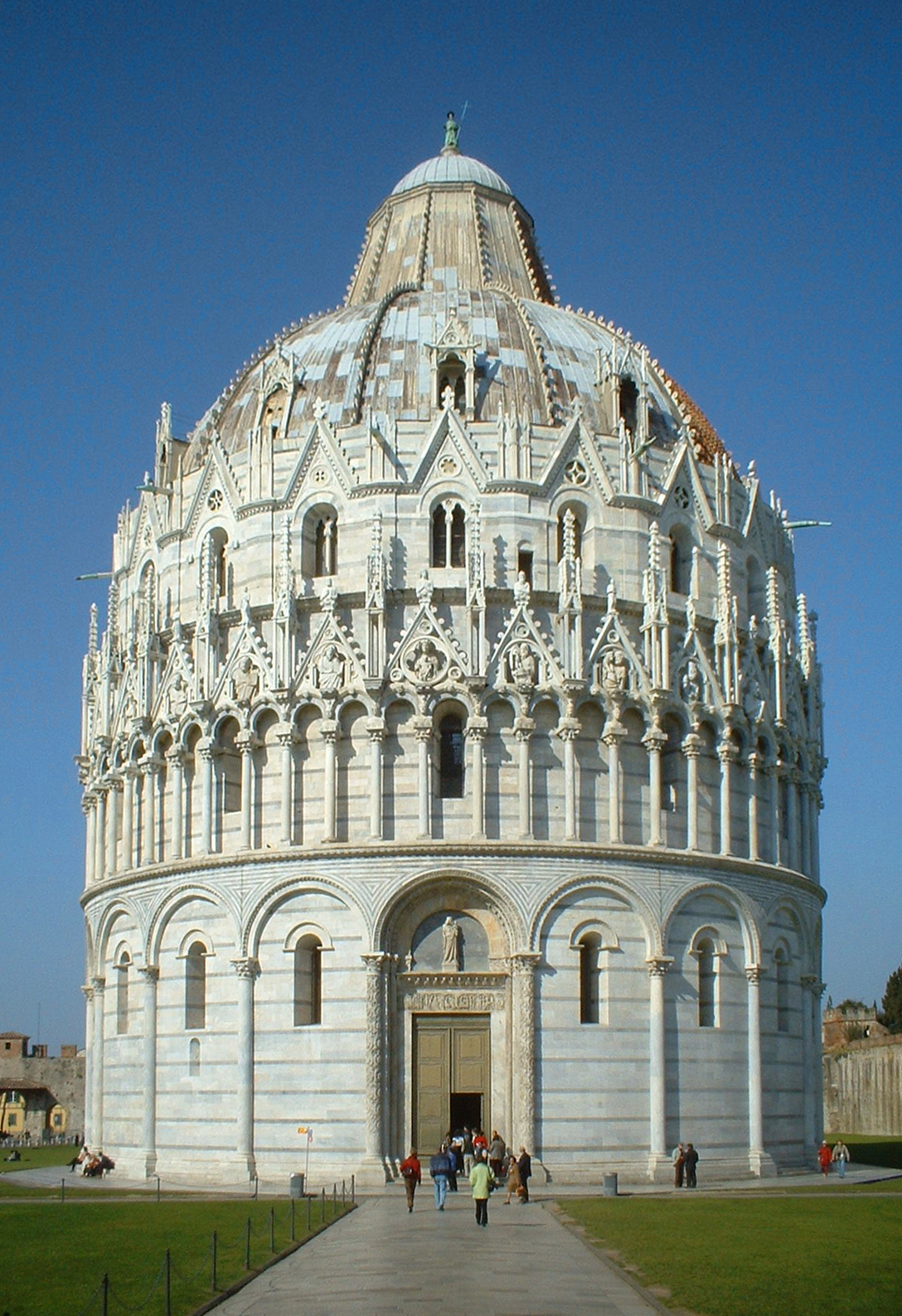
Baptistery of Pisa.

The party travels by sea to Lerici, then proceeds overland in a hired chaise, entering Tuscany (still under Austrian administration). At Pisa, Smollett's tone is relatively restrained; he praises the Leaning Tower, the Campo Santo, and the bronze doors, though some details (such as galleys being built locally) reflect outdated sources, and his description of the Baptistery’s dome contains inaccuracies regarding style.

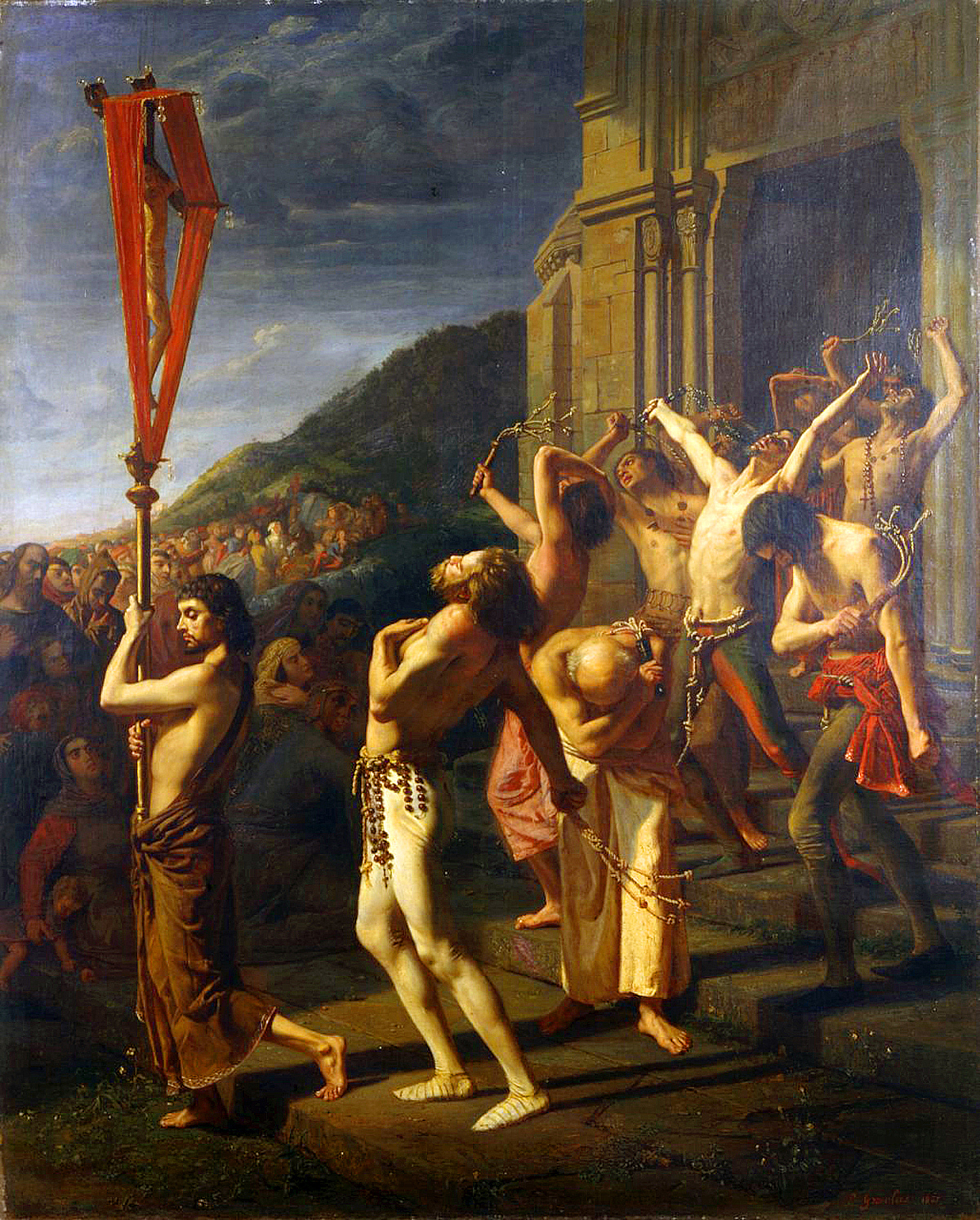
Flagellants in the 14th century, Pierre Grivolas, Musée Calvet, 1909.

In Florence, Smollett seeks to avoid conventional Grand-Tour enthusiasm. He criticises Catholic devotional practices (monks chanting litanies, paid flagellants, ornate images of the Virgin) while discussing opera, Commedia dell’arte improvisers, architecture, and cicisbei from a historical perspective.

Letters XXVII and XXVIII analyse Florence's political situation under Austrian regency after the Medici extinction in 1737, governed by the Prince of Craon as viceroy for Maria Theresa. Smollett notes Tuscan conservatism and clerical influence, as well as the role of the Englishman John Acton.

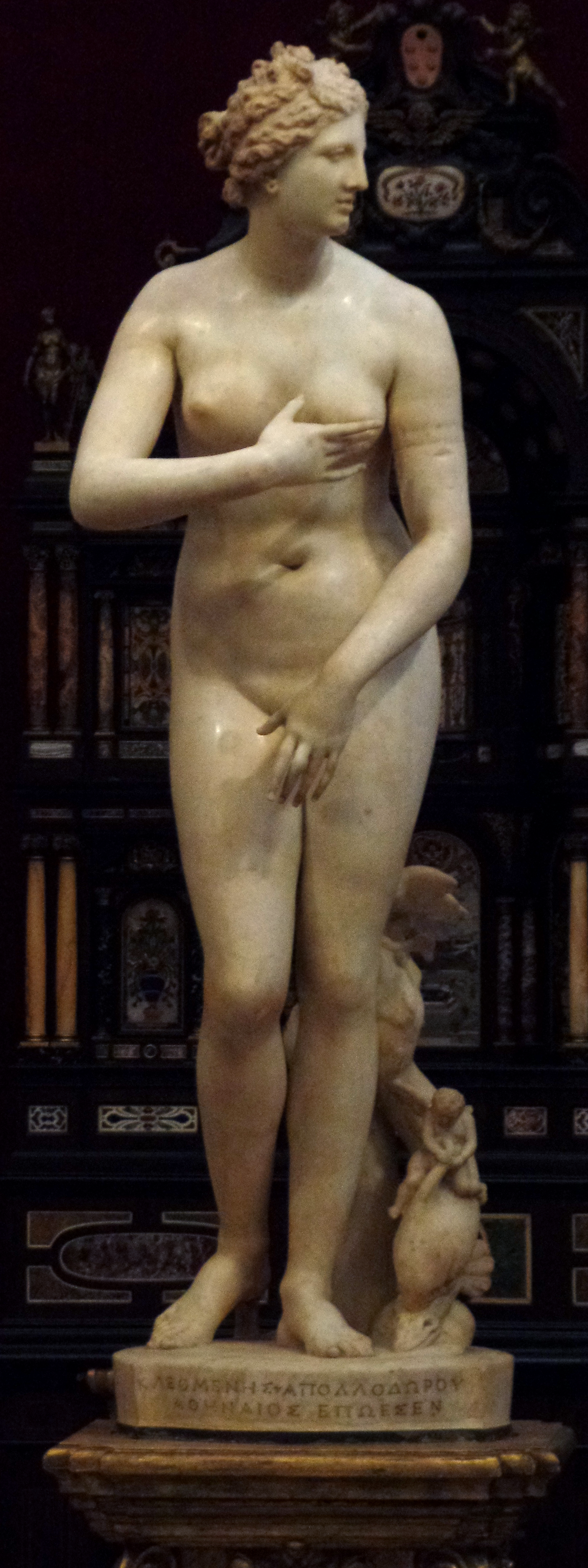
Venus de’ Medici.

The Uffizi is the principal public collection accessible to Grand Tourists, its centrepiece being the Venus de’ Medici. Contrary to widespread admiration, Smollett famously declares in letter XXVIII: "I cannot help thinking that there is no beauty in the features of Venus; and that the attitude is awkward and out of character." Similar reservations appear in earlier travellers such as Johann Georg Keyßler.

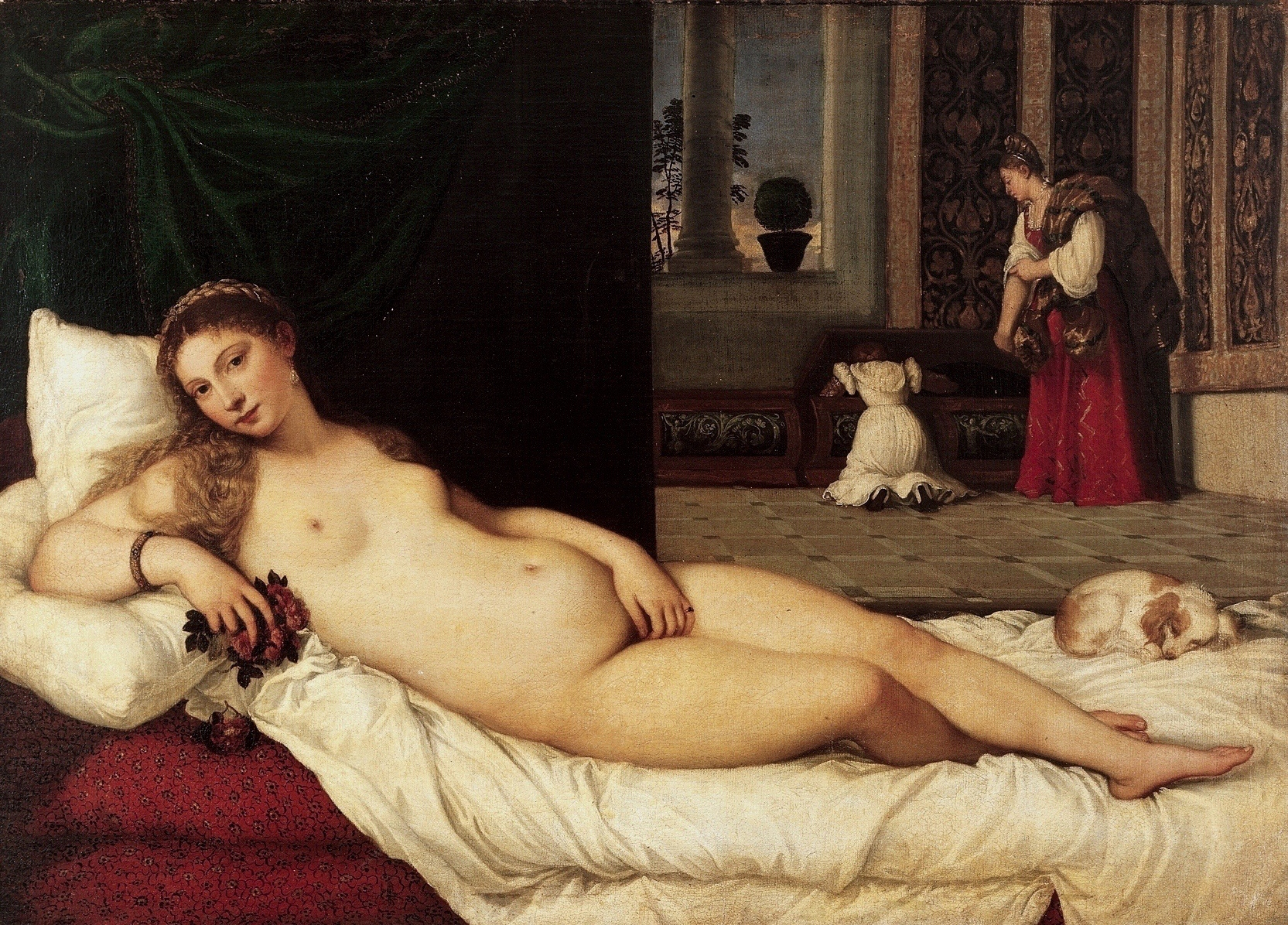
Venus of Urbino by Titian.

Smollett nonetheless analyses the statue at length, comparing it to the Aphrodite of Knidos and citing Greek inscriptions and classical authors, before expressing preference for Titian’s Venus of Urbino.

==== Rome ====
The journey from Florence to Rome proceeds in stages: Siena (forty-two miles), Buon Convento, Montepulciano (where Smollett has a dispute with a stable-hand), and Radicofani. After a difficult stretch of road, the party enters Rome via the Porta del Popolo. Smollett writes: "You may guess what I felt at first sight of the city of Rome, which, notwithstanding all the calamities it has undergone, still maintains an august and imperial appearance.""

Smollett observes the social customs of the British residents in Rome:

When you arrive at Rome, you receive cards from all your country-folks in that city: they expect to have the visit returned next day, when they give orders not to be at home; and you never speak to one another in the sequel. This is a refinement in hospitality and politeness, which the English have invented by the strength of their own genius, without any assistance either from France, Italy, or Lapland. No Englishman above the degree of a painter or cicerone frequents any coffee-house at Rome; and as there are no public diversions, except in carnival-time, the only chance you have of seeing your compatriots is either in visiting the curiosities, or at a conversazione.

Smollett provides detailed descriptions of Roman sites. He admires the Castel Sant’Angelo, the piazza and interior of St. Peter’s Basilica, the Roman Forum, the Colosseum, and the Baths of Caracalla. He expresses particular enthusiasm for the Laocoön, the Niobe group, and the Dying Gladiator. Regarding Michelangelo’s Last Judgment, he finds individual figures masterful but the overall composition less unified. He critiques British travellers who uncritically follow the 1722 guide by Jonathan Richardson and his son, and aligns his assessments of Michelangelo and Raphael with contemporary taste that privileged serenity over dramatic intensity, drawing analogies to Virgil and Homer.

==== Return to Nice ====
The return journey to Florence follows the route via Narni, Terni, Spoleto, Foligno, Perugia, and Arezzo. Smollett describes severe discomforts along the way, including poor accommodation, vermin, unpalatable food, a deteriorating carriage, cold, and rats. At Foligno, he shares a room with another traveller initially mistaken for something more alarming. Mrs Smollett endures the conditions in silence, while Smollett attributes an episode of whooping cough to bedbugs.

From Florence the party retraces the outward route via Lerici. By this stage Smollett's health has markedly improved. Letter XXXV concludes on an optimistic note: "In a word, I am now so well that I no longer despair of seeing you and the rest of my friends in England; a pleasure which is eagerly desired by — Dear Sir, Your affectionate humble Servant.""

On 7 February 1765, Smollett departs for Turin, remaining there until 18 March. He terms this leg an “excursion” and devotes only one letter to it, praising the city and particularly the fertility and harmonious landscapes of the Piedmontese countryside.

=== End of the journey ===
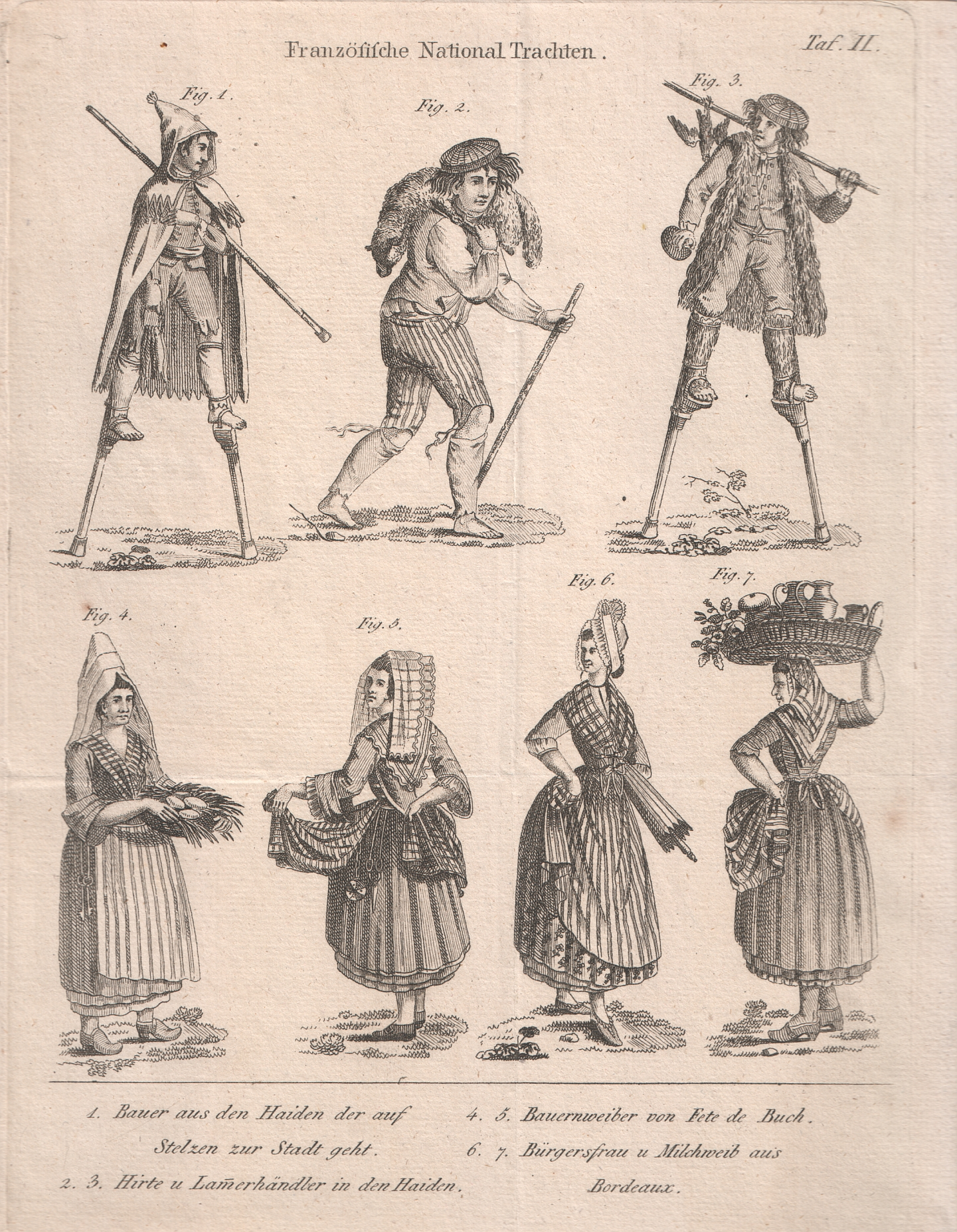
French peasants in the 18th century.

Back in Nice, Smollett responds to a query about French taxation by contrasting rural conditions in France and England. He describes prosperous English countryside with well-fed livestock and healthy peasants, against French poverty, poor housing, inadequate farming practices, and heavy fiscal burdens that he believes oppress the populace. He lists various French taxes and levies, including the taille (from which clergy, nobility, and certain bourgeoisie were exempt), the capitation, the dixième and vingtième, the gabelle, tobacco duties, and numerous other imposts. He criticises court extravagance, high official salaries, and the power of the fermiers généraux. Smollett suggests that the growing wealth and education of the Third Estate will eventually shift the balance of power. Similar predictions appear in a 1771 letter sometimes known as The Dying Prophecy, where he anticipates major upheaval in France and across Europe that would challenge established authority and clerical influence.

He also notes the French reliance on bread as a staple food. The party then begins the homeward journey via Toulon (where he repeats the saying that the King of France is greater there than at Versailles), Vienne, Aix-en-Provence, and Avignon (where he encounters their former driver Joseph again). He advises future travellers to carry nails, hammer, crowbar, iron points, a large knife, and grease.

From Lyon the route proceeds through Mâcon, Dijon, Auxerre, Sens, and Fontainebleau. Some places between Mâcon and Sens are listed out of geographical order, indicating that parts of the narrative were composed from memory.

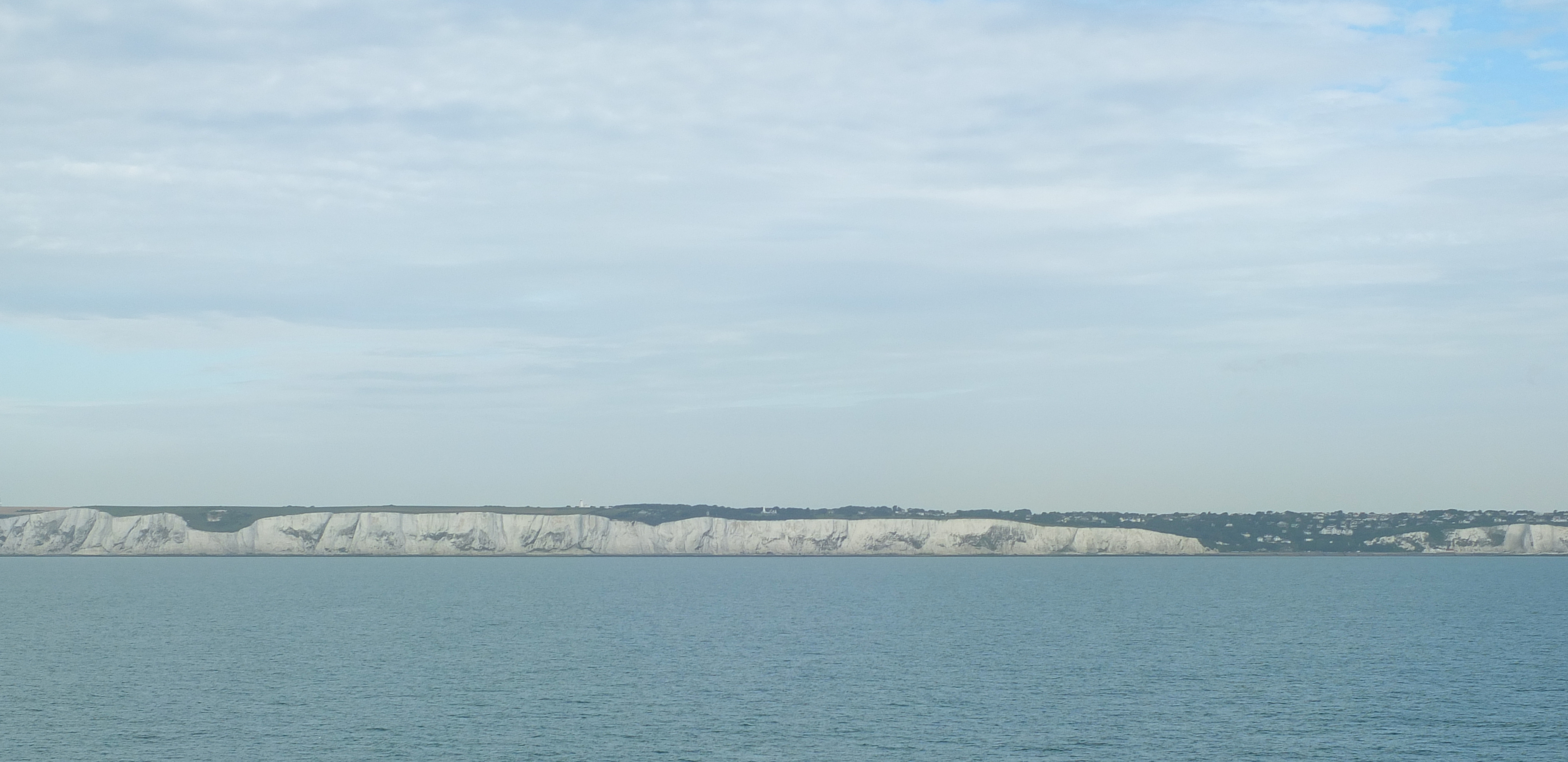
White Cliffs of Dover as seen from offshore.

The final letter, dated 13 June 1765, opens with an expression of attachment to Britain:

DEAR SIR — I am at last in a situation to indulge my view with a sight of Britain, after an absence of two years; and indeed you cannot imagine what pleasure I feel while I survey the white cliffs of Dover, at this distance. Not that I am at all affected by the nescia qua dulcedine natalis soli, of Horace. That seems to be a kind of fanaticism founded on the prejudices of education, which induces a Laplander to place the terrestrial paradise among the snows of Norway, and a Swiss to prefer the barren mountains of Solleure to the fruitful plains of Lombardy. I am attached to my country, because it is the land of liberty, cleanliness, and convenience: but I love it still more tenderly, as the scene of all my interesting connexions; as the habitation of my friends, for whose conversation, correspondence, and esteem, I wish alone to live.

Despite the hardships of the return journey, Smollett reports improved health, describing it as "mended by ill-treatment". The Montpellier physician Dr Fizes's diagnosis had proved accurate; the travel and change of climate had benefited Smollett, whose literary productivity increased upon his return to Chelsea. He later spent another winter on the Riviera and died near Livorno on 17 September 1771.

== Originality ==
In 1789, during a stay in Nice, the agronomist Arthur Young was informed by his host, the British consul, of local resentment toward Smollett. He was told that if Smollett ever returned, the inhabitants would "knock him on the head".

A comparable anecdote is recorded by David Hume, then secretary to the British ambassador in Paris, who reported that when Smollett walked the streets of Nice, crowds gathered and threw stones at him.

=== Criticism by Laurence Sterne ===
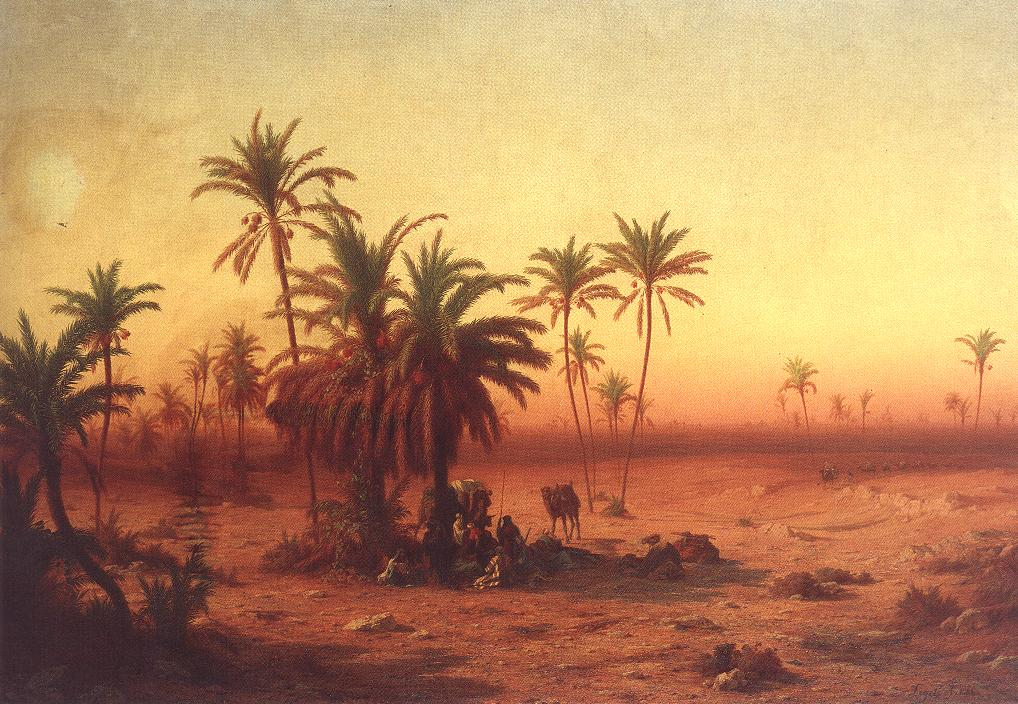
Oasis in the Desert, by Antal Ligeti (1862).

These anecdotes illustrate the intense, though short-lived, notoriety that Travels through France and Italy achieved upon publication in 1766, as well as the lasting negative reputation it gave Smollett acquired as an irritable and critical traveller. Two years later, Laurence Sterne published A Sentimental Journey Through France and Italy (1768), in which he caricatured Smollett as "the learned Smelfungus", a traveller who "can travel from Dan to Beersheba, and cry 'Tis all barren —".

Sterne's work, widely translated and enthusiastically received across Europe, quickly overshadowed Smollett's book. In many circles, A Sentimental Journey became the preferred model of travel writing, and Travels through France and Italy was increasingly dismissed or mocked.

One indication of this shift is the revival of an anecdote originally published by Voltaire in 1750 in Des Mensonges Imprimés. The story concerned an unnamed German traveller in Blois who wrote in his journal that all the women there were red-haired and quarrelsome. Smollett himself had translated part of the piece. In later retellings, the protagonist was changed to Smollett.

=== Other criticism ===
Despite fluctuations in its critical reputation, Travels through France and Italy is regarded by modern scholars as a valuable and engaging work. Frank Felsenstein describes it as highly readable, rich in documented detail and perceptive observation, and marked by the author's distinctive personality. The narrative qualities usually associated with Smollett's novels are evident in the autobiographical elements of the journey undertaken with his wife in search of a climate beneficial to his health.

The extensive information provided and the ironic tone have led Richard Jones to characterise the book as resembling a "pocket encyclopædia" in the tradition of Voltaire rather than a conventional travel account.

==== Medical circumstances ====
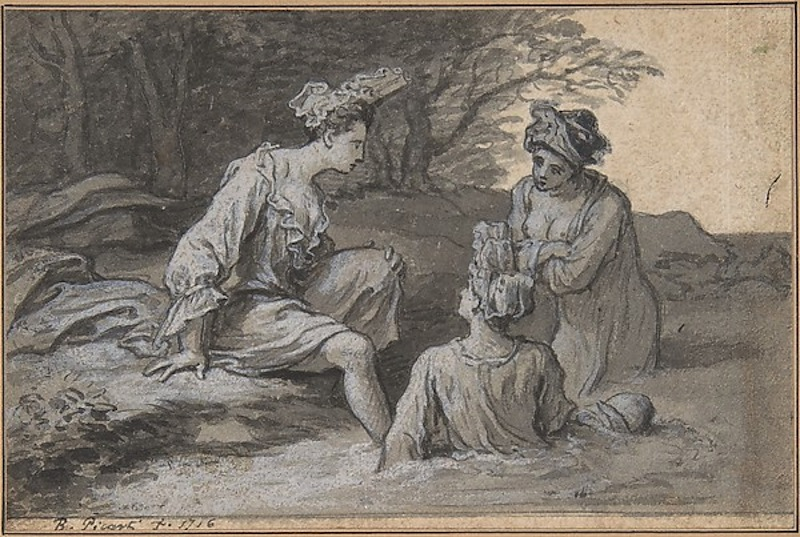
Three women conversing while bathing in a river, by Claude Simpol, 1717.

A graduate of the University of Glasgow with the degree of M.D., Smollett was well-informed about medical matters and conscious of his deteriorating condition, which he described as involving an asthmatic cough, spitting, low-grade fever, and restlessness requiring frequent changes of air and space for exercise. (Note: slow fever was a term formerly applied to lingering febrile states, often associated with consumption.) Although he strongly criticised the Montpellier physician Dr Fizes as incompetent and avaricious, the diagnosis of pulmonary tuberculosis later proved accurate, and Smollett's proactive approach to managing his illness persisted.

Smollett had long experimented with treatments for respiratory disorders. As early as 1752 he published a controversial pamphlet advocating sea bathing (then widely regarded as hazardous) in preference to the fashionable inland spas such as Bath. He put this into practice immediately upon reaching Boulogne, reporting relief from fever and chest pain despite an initial cold. He repeated the practice at Nice and, while in Rome, discussed ancient Roman bathing customs, expressing regret that they had favoured heated public baths over the Tiber. Sea bathing was not an entirely novel idea; John Locke had recommended cold-water immersion for children in Some Thoughts Concerning Education (1693), and it was traditionally practised by mothers in the Scottish Highlands.

Some contemporaries regarded Smollett's preoccupation with his health as excessive. The traveller Philip Thicknesse, for instance, repeatedly ridiculed it, suggesting the book should have been titled Quarrels through France and Italy for the cure of a pulmonic disorder.

==== Dirt and the representation of the body ====
A recurring theme in Travels through France and Italy is Smollett's strong aversion to the perceived uncleanliness of accommodations and surroundings in both France and Italy. Literary scholar Aileen Douglas examines this motif in relation to Smollett's engagement with the body, arguing that displacement from familiar British norms disrupted his accustomed perception of hygiene and corporeal boundaries, producing reactions of shock and disgust. She suggests that incidents such as the stained bedding near Arezzo, which forced Smollett to sleep in his travelling cloak, dominate the narrative to such an extent that they overshadow other experiences, eliciting a corresponding revulsion in the reader.

Some critics, beginning with Laurence Sterne's caricature of "Smelfungus" and continuing with later scholars such as Robert D. Spector and John F. Sena, interpret these passages as the product of a deliberately constructed irritable persona rather than straightforward autobiographical reporting. They note that Smollett presents sensory responses, especially to odours, as universal rather than culturally variable; his condemnation of garlic consumption, for instance, reflects an inability or unwillingness to accommodate Mediterranean culinary norms.

Douglas connects Smollett's stance to broader 18th-century debates on taste and cultural relativism, seeing in his reinforced preference for British standards an implicit endorsement of Jean de La Bruyère's assertion that taste can be objectively correct or defective: "There is in art a point of perfection, as of goodness or maturity in nature. He who feels it and loves it has perfect taste; he who does not feel it and loves below or beyond it has defective taste. There is therefore a good and a bad taste, and one disputes tastes with foundation."

==== Characterization of the protagonist ====
Travelling on the Continent frequently involved linguistic difficulties for English visitors, resulting in disputes with postilions and innkeepers. While many British travel writers minimised or omitted such incidents to avoid accusations of prejudice, (Note: From the mid-18th century Britain, as the leading maritime and commercial power, exhibited strong Francophobia rooted in centuries of rivalry dating back to the Hundred Years’ War, intensified by religious differences after the Reformation and by recurring conflicts such as the wars of Louis XIV and the recent Seven Years’ War.) Smollett records them candidly, regarding frankness as essential to truthful reporting. Critics such as Frank Felsenstein argue that this outspokenness, though often interpreted as ill-temper, contributes to the vigour and distinctive character of the narrative.

The book's immediate success in 1766–1767 owed much to its appeal to contemporary British attitudes. Smollett's unflattering depictions of French and Italian society, portraying the inhabitants of Nice as physically unimpressive and slovenly, local artisans as indolent, merchants as dishonest, nobility as degraded, and cultural life as stagnant, resonated with insular sentiment in the aftermath of the Seven Years’ War. (Note: The Yahoos in Jonathan Swift’s Gulliver’s Travels are degenerate, filthy human-like creatures symbolising the worst aspects of humanity.) As Hippolyte Taine later observed, such portrayals elevated national prejudice to an almost institutional level.

==== A double-edged raillery ====
Marriage A-la-Mode, plate 4, The Toilette, by William Hogarth.

Smollett's criticism extends beyond continental Europeans to include the young, wealthy British travellers on the Grand Tour, whom he portrays as gullible victims of local exploitation: "birds of passage who cheerfully allow themselves to be plucked". He deplores their adoption of continental fashions, associating them with the effeminate petits maîtres or macaroni figures satirised by artists such as William Hogarth, notably in plate 4 of Marriage A-la-Mode (The Toilette).

Throughout the book, Smollett repeatedly describes such travellers as naive and profligate, easily deceived by gamblers, courtesans, antiquarians, and art dealers. In letter XXIX he writes:

I have seen in different parts of Italy, a number of raw boys, whom Britain seemed to have poured forth on purpose to bring her national character into contempt, ignorant, petulant, rash, and profligate, without any knowledge or experience of their own, without any director to improve their understanding, or superintend their conduct. One engages in play with an infamous gamester, and is stripped perhaps in the very first partie: another is pillaged by an antiquated cantatrice; a third is bubbled by a knavish antiquarian; and a fourth is laid under contribution by a dealer in pictures. Some turn fiddlers, and pretend to compose: but all of them talk familiarly of the arts, and return finished connoisseurs and coxcombs, to their own country.

Smollett consistently rejects fashionable artistic doctrines and continental affectations, maintaining a perspective rooted in British common-sense values. He prioritises factual accuracy over diplomatic omission, recording details others might suppress. Contemporary reviewer W. J. Prowse later described the work as "not a more truthful book in the language". This commitment to unvarnished observation contributed significantly to the book's initial popularity and to the gratitude expressed by readers who valued its candid realism.

==== Self-mockery ====
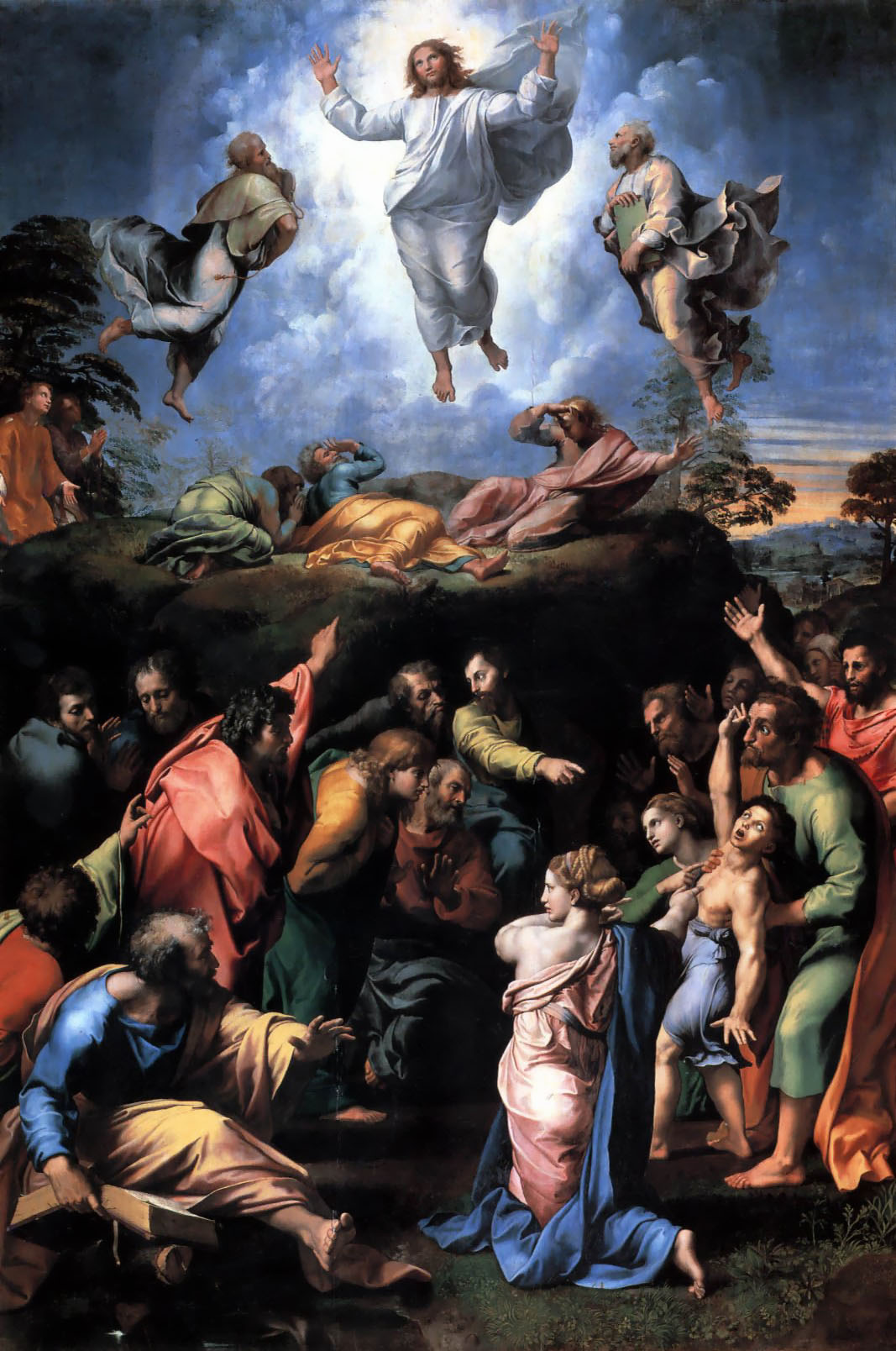
Transfiguration by Raphael.

Smollett avoids overt didacticism in Travels through France and Italy. He frequently tempers potentially dogmatic judgements with self-deprecation, expressions of modesty (occasionally ironic), and acknowledgements of his own limitations as an amateur observer. He anticipates criticism from the virtuosi and concedes that some opinions may appear capricious or superficial. This is particularly evident in his discussions of art, where he presents personal assessments that diverge from established consensus, such as his negative evaluation of the Venus de' Medici and his suggestion that the lower portion of Raphael's Transfiguration (traditionally attributed to pupils) is so inferior that, were the painting his own, he "would cut it in two parts".

==== Documentation and discernment ====
Smollett was well-versed in travel literature before writing his own account. His earlier works, including A Complete History of England, the 1756 A Compendium of Authentic and Entertaining Voyages, and reviews of travel books in The Critical Review, had familiarised him with the genre.

He drew extensively on published guides and accounts. Among English-language sources were Joseph Addison's Remarks on Several Parts of Italy (1705), Thomas Nugent's The Grand Tour (1749), and the four-volume edition of Johann Georg Keyßler's Travels through Germany, Bohemia, Hungary, Switzerland, Italy and Lorrain (1760). He also consulted Bernard de Montfaucon's Travels from Paris thro' Italy (1712) and Anton Friedrich Büsching's A New System of Geography (1762).

During the journey he acquired additional works in French and Italian. In Nîmes he obtained Abbé Antoine Valette de Travessac's Abrégé de l'Histoire de Nîmes (1760); in Florence, Giuseppe Bianchi's Ragguaglio delle Antichità et rarità che si Conservano nella Galleria Mediceo-Imperiale di Firenze (1759); and for Rome, he relied heavily on Mariano Vasi's Itinerario Istruttivo di Roma (1763) and the anonymous Roma Antica e Moderna: ossia Nuova Descrizione di tutti gli edifici antichi e moderni, tanto sagri, quanto profani della città di Roma. He incorporated material from these sources, sometimes translating passages so seamlessly that they blend into his own prose.

The use of recent continental guides, many inaccessible to monolingual English readers, demonstrates the breadth of Smollett's research. Most letters describing Italy were composed after his return to Nice, where he had access to these reference works.

==== Epistolary form ====
The epistolary form was common in 18th-century travel literature, allowing authors to present observations in a personal and engaging manner. Smollett employs it effectively to convey enthusiasm for notable sites, such as the Pont du Gard and the approach to Rome. His commentary reflects professional interests: as a physician he frequently addresses hygiene and public health; as an informed observer he discusses engineering achievements such as bridges and aqueducts. The letters are addressed to a correspondent but are clearly intended for a broader readership of educated gentlemen familiar with history, diplomacy, aesthetics, and contemporary taste. Interest is maintained through vivid anecdotes, personal reflections, and occasional direct appeals to the reader.

The epistolary structure is particularly effective in the extended treatment of Nice, which spans multiple letters (XIV, XVI–XXIV, and XXXVIII) and provides comprehensive historical, geographical, political, economic, social, and cultural analysis. Detail is meticulous: Smollett personally remeasures the arena at Cemenelum in Cimiez using packing twine, and maintains uninterrupted daily weather records throughout his eighteen-month residence. (Note: Smollett's complete weather register for Nice appears on pages 333–358 of the edition edited by Frank Felsenstein.)

==== Linguistic contribution ====
Travels through France and Italy incorporates numerous French and Italian loanwords and phrases, primarily denoting aspects of daily life, cuisine, transport, naval matters, and social customs. While some had already appeared in earlier British writers including Joseph Addison, John Evelyn, Samuel Johnson, Jonathan Swift, Lady Mary Wortley Montagu, Thomas Gray, James Boswell, and Lord Chesterfield, many entered general English usage through Smollett's book and remain current, sometimes with modified meanings. Subsequent appearances of similar terms in 19th-century French authors such as Stendhal and Alexandre Dumas reflect their own engagement with Italian culture rather than direct influence from Smollett.

A berline.

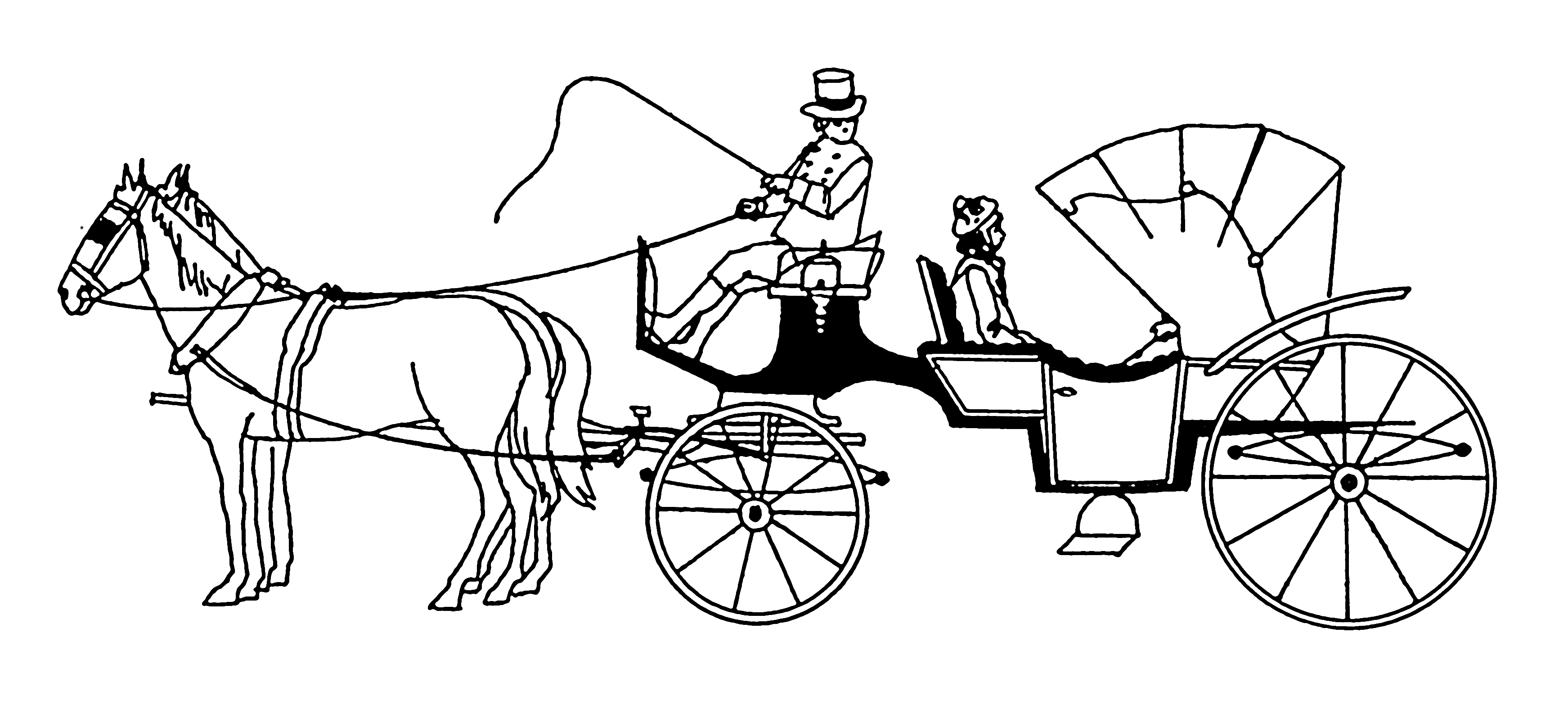
A barouche.

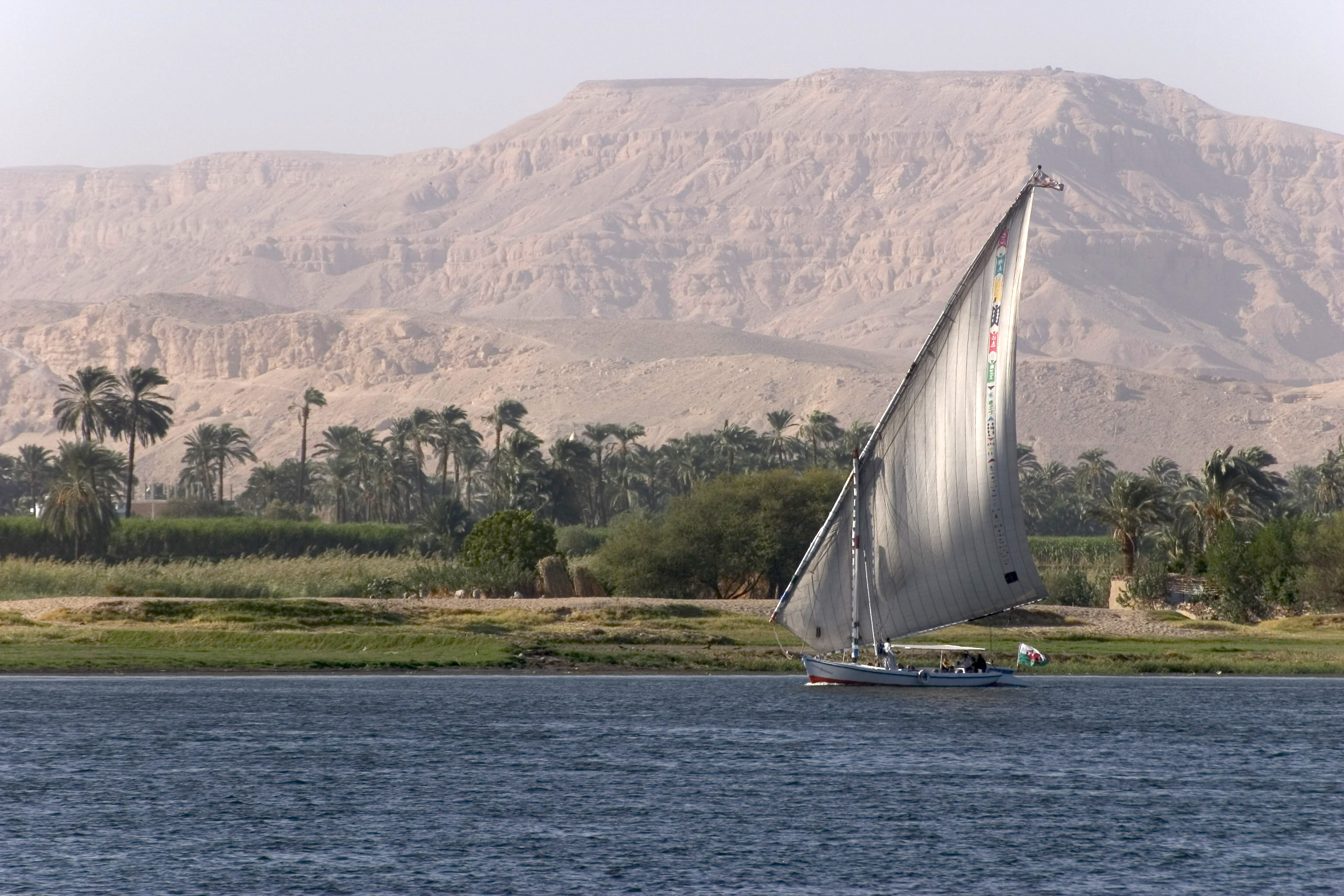
A felucca.

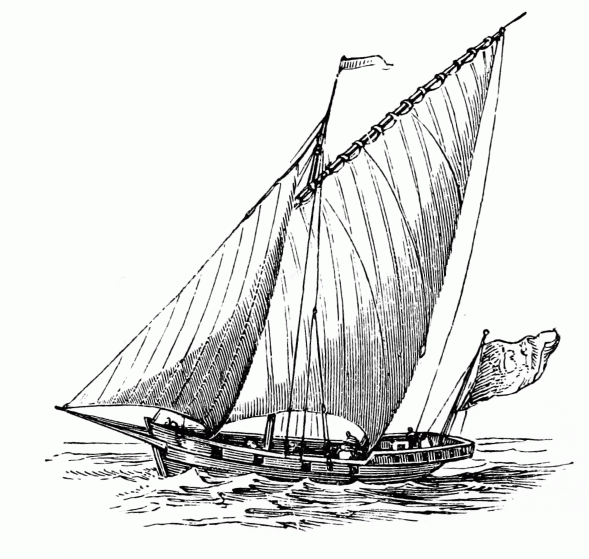
A tartane.

Travel-related terms introduced or popularised by Smollett include berline (a type of coach, already used by Swift and Chesterfield but widely disseminated through the book and later associated with the French royal family's flight to Varennes), calesse (calash, precursor of calèche), cambiatura (change of post-horses, common in England and Tuscany), felucca (a coastal vessel of Arabic origin), and tartane (a small open carriage). Weather terms include bise (spelled bize by Smollett, a cold northerly wind), maestral (Mistral), and valanches (avalanches, mentioned in letter XXXVIII).

Terms relating to housing and domestic life include brasiere (a portable charcoal heater used in Nice), cassine (a modest rural dwelling, related to modern cabane), corridore (corridor, previously recorded by Evelyn and Johnson), and douche (shower, from Italian doccia). Social and culinary terms include conversazione (evening gathering, refining Gray's earlier usage), corinth (a type of small raisin, now currants), garum (ancient Roman fermented fish sauce), macaroni (both pasta and, pejoratively, Italians or fops), liqueur (distinguished from general liquor), polenta (praised for medicinal properties in letter XXII), and villeggiatura (country retreat, letter XXIX).

Other lasting borrowings include tip (gratuity), sigisbeo (cavalier servente, letter XVII), gabelle (salt tax), improvisatore (later improvisator, letter XXVII), and Preniac (a light Bordeaux wine from Preignac encountered in Boulogne).

==== Final revisions ====
Smollett appears to have been aware of the growing criticism of Travels through France and Italy after its initial favourable reception. The book is not mentioned in his surviving correspondence after a letter dated 17 January 1767 to Elizabeth Gunning, Duchess of Hamilton and Argyll, in which he sought her assistance in obtaining the consulship at Nice. This predates Laurence Sterne's satirical portrayal of him in A Sentimental Journey Through France and Italy (1768) and Smollett's final relocation to Italy.

During his last years near Livorno, Smollett worked on The Expedition of Humphry Clinker (1771) while continuing to revise Travels through France and Italy. Changes included corrections to passages on Pisa and Florence (for instance, removing references to galley construction in Pisa and moderating praise for the Uffizi curator, who was later convicted of theft and damage to the collection).

== Bibliography ==
=== Text ===
- Smollett, Tobias George; Anderson, Robert (1811). The Miscellaneous Works of Tobias Smollett, M.D.: With Memoirs of His Life and Writings. Vol. 1. Edinburgh: S. Doig & A. Stirling.
- Smollett, Tobias; Felsenstein, Frank (1981). Travels through France and Italy. World's Classics. introduction and notes. Oxford: Oxford University Press. ISBN 0-19-283634-X.

=== Translations ===
- Smollett, Tobias (1993). Lettres de Nice. Sur Nice et les environs. Registre du temps, novembre 1763-mars 1765 [Letters from Nice. On Nice and its surroundings. Weather register, November 1763–March 1765] (in French). Translated by Edouard Pilatte and Jacqueline Engert. extract from Travels through France and Italy, 1766. Spéracèdes, Alpes-Maritimes: Tac Motifs. p. 208. ISBN 2-906339-15-6.
- Smollett, Tobias; Fayot, André (1994). Voyages à travers la France et l'Italie [Travels through France and Italy]. Domaine romantique (in French). translation and presentation. Paris: José Corti Éditions. p. 395. ISBN 2-7143-0505-9.

=== Biographies ===
- Boucé, Paul-Gabriel (1971). Esquisse biographique, Les Romans de Smollett, étude critique [Biographical sketch, Smollett's Novels, critical study] (in French). Paris: Didier. pp. 29–68.
- Knapp, Lewis M. (1963). Tobias Smollett, Doctor of Men and Manners. New York: Russell and Russell. p. 362.
- Lewis, Jeremy (2003). Tobias Smollett. London: Jonathan Cape. p. 316. ISBN 0-224-06151-8.

=== Works likely known to Smollett ===
- Addison, Joseph (1745) [1705]. Remarks on several parts of Italy, &c. in the years 1701, 1702, 1703. London: J. and R. Tonson and S. Draper.
- de Brosses, Charles (1848) [1740]. Lettres familières écrites d'Italie à quelques amis en 1739 et 1740 [Familiar letters written from Italy to some friends in 1739 and 1740] (in French). Paris: Poulet-Malassis et de Broise. p. 344.
- Coote, J. (1739). A New Geographical Dictionary, containing a Full and Accurate Account of the several Parts of the Known World. 2 vols., folio (1760 reprint ed.). London.
- Grosley, Pierre-Jean (1764). Nouveaux Mémoires ou observations sur l'Italie et sur les Italiens, par deux gentilshommes suédois [New Memoirs or observations on Italy and the Italians, by two Swedish gentlemen] (in French). 3 vol. in-12 (1770, 5 vol. in-12; London, Lausanne, 1770, 3 vol. in-12; 1774, 4 vol. in-12 reprint ed.). London: J. Nourse.
- Grosley, Pierre-Jean (1769). New Observations on Italy. Translated by Thomas Nugent. London: J. Nourse.
- Jefferys, Thomas (1761). A description of the maritime parts of France, containing a particular account of all the fortified towns, forts, harbours, bays, and rivers, with their tides, currents, soundings, shoals, &c., also of all manufactures, and articles of commerce, and of the most remarkable invasions, sieges, and sea-fights, which have happened on or near that coast. Illustrated with charts of the sea-coast, and plans of all the fortified places on it. Collected from the best authorities. Engraved by Tho. Jefferys … To which are prefixed, a glossary, and plans of the several parts of fortification, on two plates, to explain the terms made use of in the work. London.
- Montfaucon, Bernard de (1725) [1712]. Travels of the Learned Dr. Montfaucon from Paris through Italy. London: J. Tonson and J. Watts.
- Northall, John (1766). Travels through Italy; containing new and curious Observations on that Country. … With the most authentic Account yet published of capital Pieces in Painting, Sculpture, and Architecture that are to be seen in Italy, &c. London: S. Hooper.
- Whatley, Stephen (1710). Voyages et avantures [sic] de Jacques Massé [The Travels and Adventures of J. Massey] (in French). Translated by Tyssot de Patot (1743 reprint ed.). London: J. Watts. p. 350.

=== General writings ===
- Boswell, James (1824). The Life of Samuel Johnson, LL. D., Comprehending an Account of His Studies, and Numerous Works, in Chronological Order : A Series of His Epistolary Correspondence and Conversations with Many Eminent Persons; and Various Original Pieces of His Composition, Never Before Published; the Whole Exhibiting a View of Literature and Literary Men in Great Britain, for Near Half a Century During which He Flourished. Vol. 2. London: J. Brumby.
- Smith, Warren Hunting (1952). Originals Abroad, The Foreign Careers of Some Eighteenth Century Britons. New Haven: Yale University Press.
- Locke, John (1968). "Some Thoughts Concerning Education". In James T. Axel (ed.). The Educational Writings of John Locke. Cambridge: Cambridge University Press.
- Sena, John F. (1968). "Smollett's Persona and the Melancholic Traveler: An Hypothesis". Eighteenth-Century Studies. 1 (4). Johns Hopkins Press: 353–369. doi:10.2307/2737856. JSTOR 2737856.
- Rohault de Fleury, Georges (1886). Les monuments de Pise au Moyen Âge (in French). Paris: A. Morel.
- Adam, Peter (1970). Pasquale Paoli: an enlightened hero 1725–1807. Archon Books. p. 117. ISBN 0-208-01031-9.
- Spector, Robert D. (1980). Tobias Smollett: A Reference Guide. Boston: G. K. Hall.
- Hibbert, Christopher (1987). The Grand Tour. London: Thames Methuen. p. 156.
- Eche, Antoine; Duquaire, Alexandre; Kremer, Nathalie (2006). Les genres littéraires et l'ambition anthropologique au XVIIIe siècle : Expériences et limites [Literary genres and the anthropological ambition in the 18th century: Experiences and limits]. La République des Lettres (in French). dir. Leuven-Paris: Éditions Peeters. p. 194. ISBN 978-90-429-1704-0.
- Eche, Antoine (2006). "Images littéraires du Val de Loire dans les récits britanniques au XVIIe et XVIIIe siècles" [Literary images of the Loire Valley in British narratives in the 17th and 18th centuries]. Mémoires de la Société des sciences et lettres du Loir-et-Cher (in French) (61).

=== Specific works ===
- Prowse, W. J. (1870). "Smollett at Nice". Macmillan Magazine (XXI). Cambridge: Cambridge University Press.
- Chancellor, E. B. (13 December 1981). "Wogs begin at Calais". The Observer. London.
- Miles, Peter (1982). "A Semi-Mental Journey: Structure and Illusion in Smollett's Travels". The Art of Travel: Essays and Travel Writing. London: P. Dodd.
- Kelley, Robert E. (1985). "From Letter to Letter: Smollett's Travels". Studies in Scottish Literature. Vol. 20. Columbia: University of South Carolina. pp. 101–122.
- Watkins, D. (14 June 1986). "Doctor Smollett's Riviera Cure-All". My Weekly (3783): 25–26.
- Douglas, Aileen (1995). "Matter out of Place: Travels through France and Italy". Uneasy Sensations: Smollett and the Body. Chicago: University of Chicago Press. pp. 27–42. ISBN 0226160513.
- Bowers, T. (1997). "Reconstituting the National Body in Smollett's Travels through France and Italy". Eighteenth-Century Life. 21 (1). Durham, N. C.: Duke University Press: 1–25.
- Ravit, Marie-Joelle (1997). Voyageurs britanniques en France et en Italie dans la seconde moitié du dix-huitieme siecle: Tobias Smollett et Laurence Sterne [British travellers in France and Italy in the second half of the eighteenth century: Tobias Smollett and Laurence Sterne] (in French). Paris: Université de Paris IV. p. 475.
- Bottaro, Alain (2014). "La villégiature anglaise et l'invention de la Côte d'Azur" [English seaside holidays and the invention of the Côte d’Azur]. In Situ (in French). 24. Nice. doi:10.4000/insitu.11060.
- Jones, Richard J. (2011). Tobias Smollett in the enlightenment: travels through France, Italy, and Scotland. Lewisburg: Bucknell University Press. p. 232. ISBN 978-1-61148-048-1.
