= Rafael Rodríguez Mohedano =

Spanish Franciscan, historian and writer

Rafael Rodríguez Mohedano (1725–1787) was a Spanish Franciscan, historian and writer.
