= Catherine Jemmat =

English author

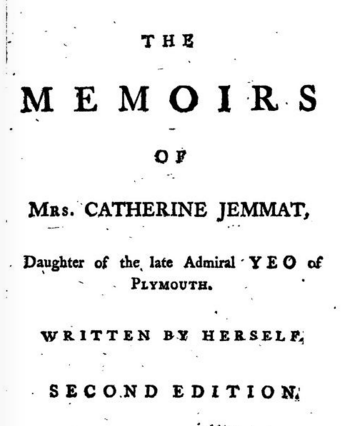
Memoirs etc by Mrs Catherine Jemmat

Catherine Jemmat (bap. 1714 – 1766) was an English writer who published in The Gentleman's Magazine and produced two collections of her own.

== Life ==
She was born Catherine Yeo. Her father, the Royal Navy captain John Yeo (d. 1756), was at sea for long periods. She was left to the care of an immature and neglectful stepmother. Catherine was educated for a while at a boarding school. She eventually sought escape from her father in a hasty marriage to a Plymouth silk mercer called Jemmat. Jemmat proved a drunkard who was deep in debt and who was soon bankrupt. Captain Yeo, who retired with the rank of Rear-Admiral, refused to support her or the daughter she had by Jemmat.

Catherine struck out on her own and made a living by getting the wealthy to sponsor publications of her own and collected works by friends. The works were often ribald and many of the sponsors listed are anonymous.

== Works ==
Her main work is Memoirs (2 vols, 1762). She also published Miscellanies in Prose and Verse (1766). She freely admitted that the volumes also contained the work of others and it is unclear which are her own and which by others.

In some of her works, she bemoans the double standard that allowed men to debauch themselves without a mark on their character whilst women receive "perpetual odium".
