= Heinrich Wilhelm von Gerstenberg =

German poet and critic (1737–1823)

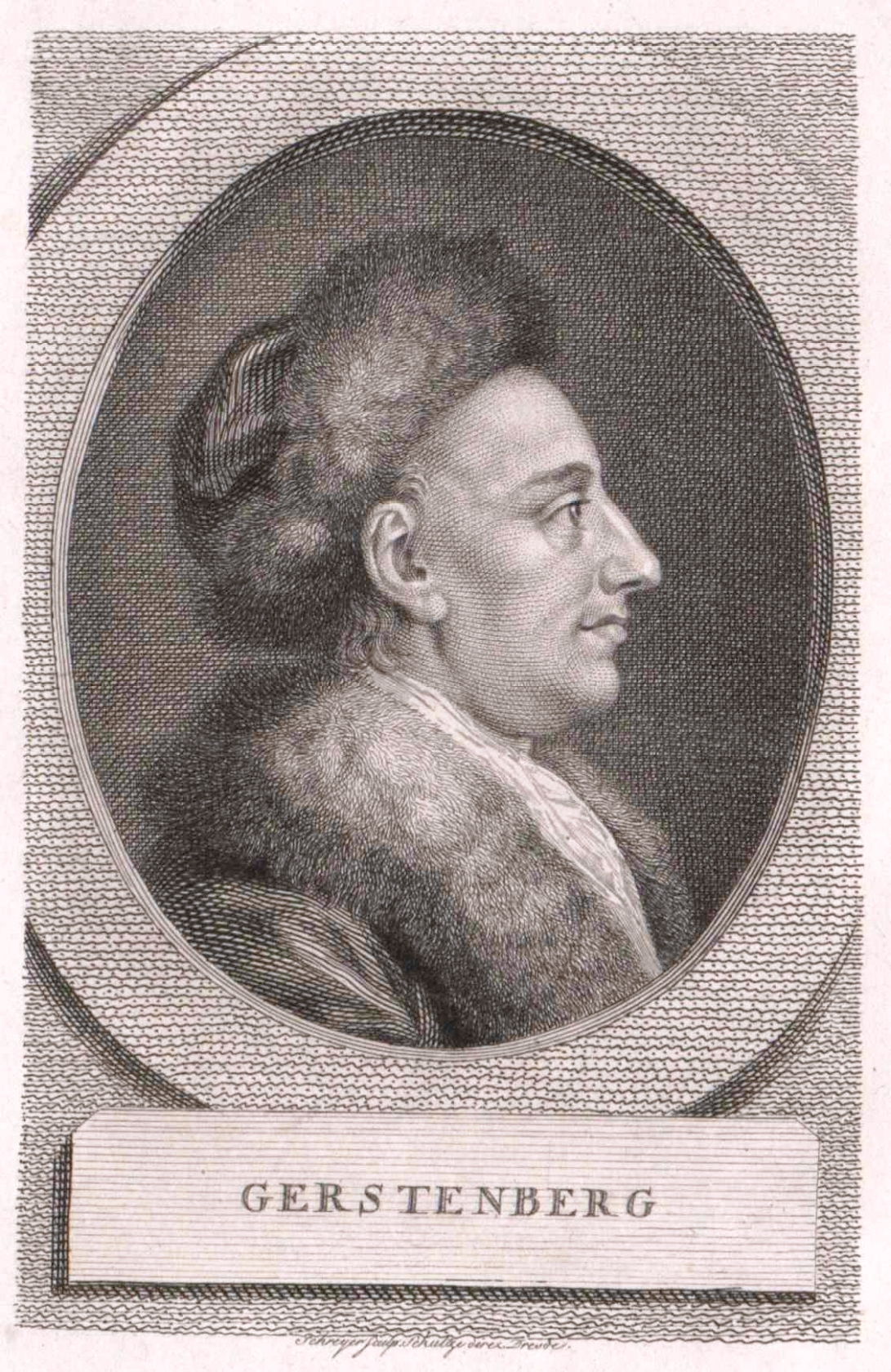
Heinrich Wilhelm von Gerstenberg.

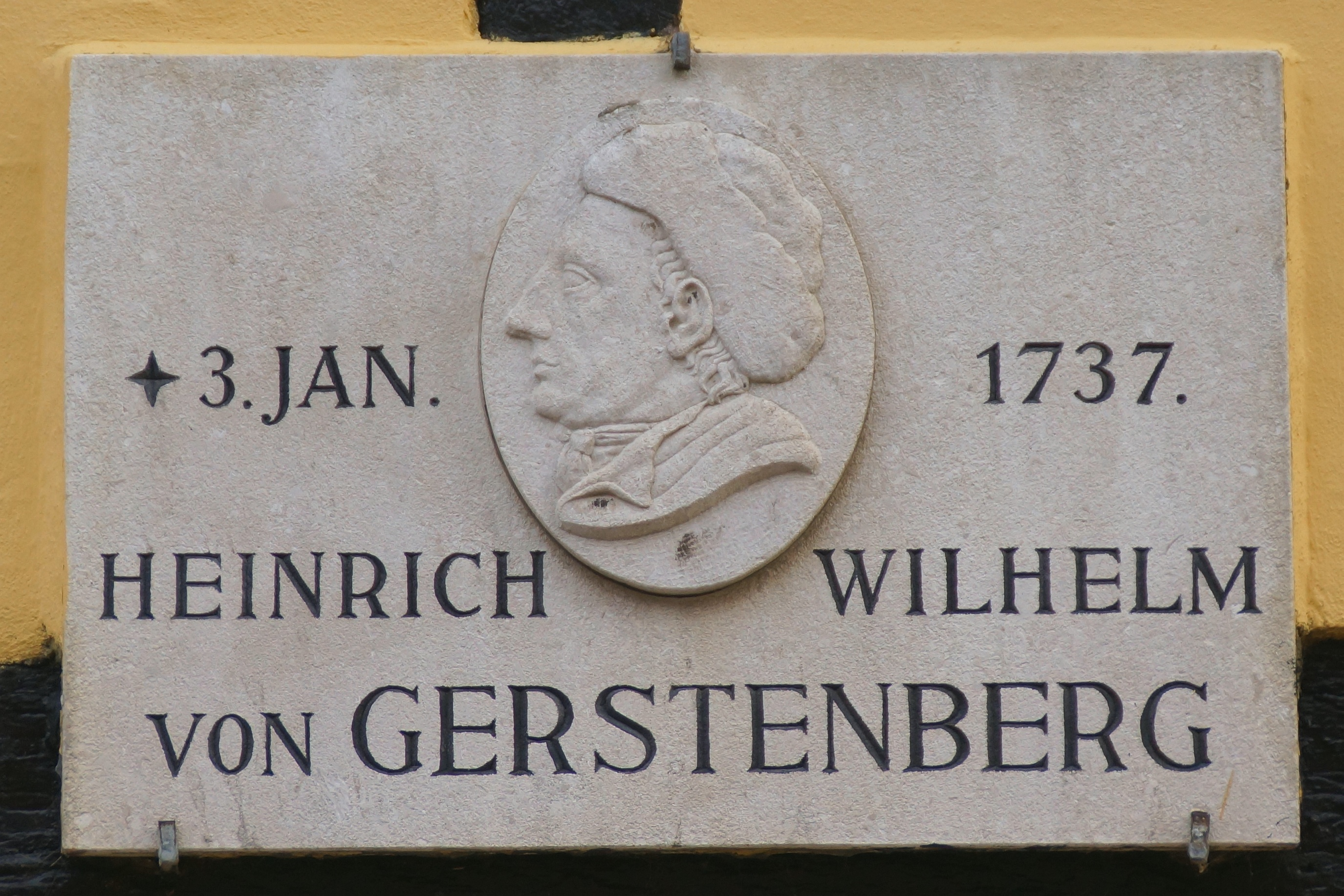
Board on birthplace in Tønder, Denmark (Photo 2015)

Heinrich Wilhelm von Gerstenberg (3 January 1737 – 1 November 1823) was a German poet and critic.

Gerstenberg was born in Tønder, Denmark. After attending school in Husum and at the Christianeum Hamburg, and studying law at the University of Jena (1757–1759), he entered 1760 the Danish military service and took later part in the Russian campaign of 1762. He spent the next twelve years in Copenhagen, where he was a close friend of Friedrich Gottlieb Klopstock. His military period ends in the year 1771. Von Gerstenberg was a Danish deputy in a German Chamber and was an assessor in the Commercial Deputation up to 1775.

From 1775 to 1783 he represented Denmark's interests as Danish Resident at Lübeck, and in 1786 received a judicial appointment at Altona, where he died in November 1823.

In the course of his long life, Gerstenberg passed through many phases of his nation's literature. He began as an imitator of the Anacreontic school (Tändeleyen, 1759); then wrote, in imitation of Gleim, Kriegslieder eines dänischen Grenadiers (1762); with his Gedicht eines Skalden (1766) he joined the group of bards led by Klopstock. He translated Beaumont and Fletcher's Maid's Tragedy (1767), and helped to usher in the Sturm und Drang period with a gruesome but powerful tragedy, Ugolino (1768). But he did perhaps even better service to the new literary movement with his Briefe über Merkwürdigkeiten der Litteratur (1766–1770), in which the critical principles of the Sturm und Drang, and especially its enthusiasm for Shakespeare, were first definitely formulated. In later life Gerstenberg lost touch with literature, and occupied himself mainly with Kant's philosophy.

His Vermischte Schriften appeared in 3 vols. (1815). The Briefe über Merkwürdigkeiten der Litteratur were republished with an introduction by Alexander von Weilen (1888).
