= 1765 in literature =

This article presents lists of the literary events and publications in 1765.

== Events ==
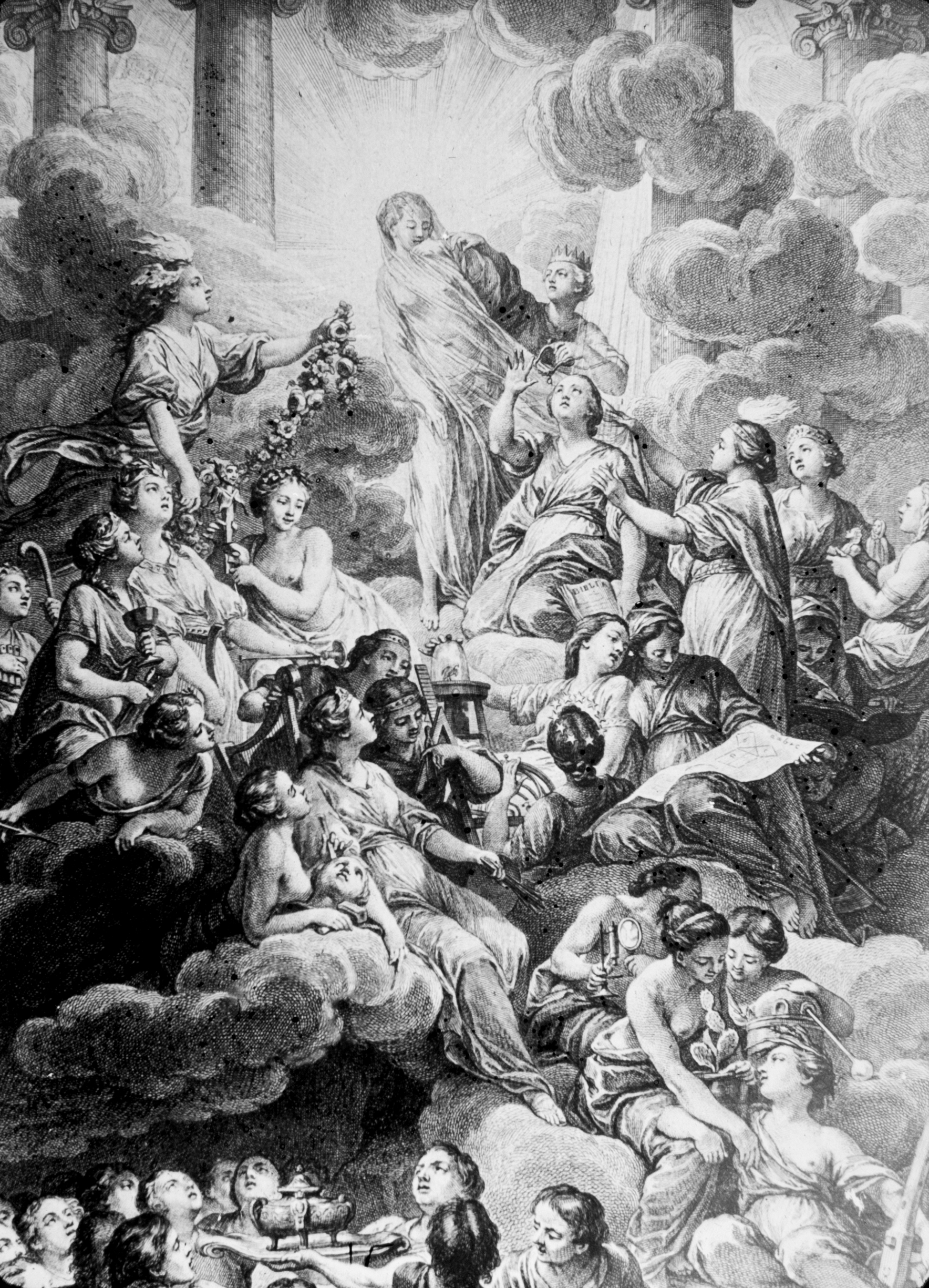
Extract from the frontispiece of the Encyclopédie (1772). It was drawn by Charles-Nicolas Cochin and engraved by Bonaventure-Louis Prévost. The work is laden with symbolism: The figure in the center represents Truth, surrounded by bright light (the central symbol of the Enlightenment). Two other figures on the right, Reason and Philosophy, are tearing the veil from Truth.

- January 10 – Arthur Murphy introduces Hester Thrale and her husband to Samuel Johnson.
- August 12 – I'tisam-ud-Din writes the Treaty of Allahabad between the Mughal Empire and the British East India Company
- October 10 – Samuel Johnson's edition of The Plays of William Shakespeare is published in London after ten years in the making.
- Summer – Denis Diderot completes the Encyclopédie. The title pages of volumes 8 through 17, published together in 1765, show Neufchastel as the place of publication. Neuchâtel was safely across the French border in what is now part of Switzerland but which was then an independent principality, where production of the Encyclopédie would have been secure from interference by the French state. Meanwhile, the actual production of volumes 8 through 17 quietly continued, presumably in Paris, but perhaps somewhere else. To minimize publicity, the French government seems to have stipulated that the final volumes be released at the same time. The volumes were apparently finished in the summer of 1765, allowing delivery to begin by the end of the year.
- Approximate year – Beginning of the Sturm und Drang movement in German literature.

== New books ==
=== Fiction ===
- Henry Brooke – The Fool of Quality (volume one; the fifth and last appeared in 1770)
- Madame Riccoboni – L'Histoire d'Ernestine
- Laurence Sterne – The Life and Opinions of Tristram Shandy, Gentleman (vol vii–viii)
- Anonymous – The Fruit-Shop

=== Children ===
- Anonymous – The History of Little Goody Two-Shoes (attributed to Oliver Goldsmith)

=== Drama ===
- Isaac Bickerstaffe – operas
  - Daphne and Amintor
  - The Maid of the Mill
- Dorothea Biehl – Den listige Optrækkerske
- George Colman the Elder – The Comedies of Terence
- Ramón de la Cruz – El Prado por la noche
- Charles Dibdin – The Shepherd's Artifice
- Samuel Foote – The Commissary
- Carlo Gozzi – L'augellino bel verde
- Elizabeth Griffith – The Platonic Wife
- Michel-Jean Sedaine – Philosophe sans le savoir
- William Shirley – Electra

=== Poetry ===
- James Beattie
  - The Judgment of Paris
  - Verses Occasioned by the Death of Charles Churchill
- William Collins – Works
- Edward Jerningham – An Elegy Written Among the Ruins of an Abbey
- James Macpherson – The Works of Ossian
- Thomas Percy – Reliques of Ancient English Poetry
- Christopher Smart – A Translation of the Psalms of David
- Percival Stockdale – Churchill Defended
- Nicolás Fernandez de Moratín – La Diana o Arte de la caza

=== Non-fiction ===
- William Blackstone – Commentaries on the Laws of England (publication begins)
- John Bunyan (died 1688) – Imprisonment of Mr. John Bunyan
- Anders Chydenius – The National Gain (Den nationnale winsten)
- Benito Jerónimo Feijóo y Montenegro – Opera omnia
- Henry Fuseli – Reflections on the Painting and Sculpture of the Greeks (translation of Johann Joachim Winckelmann)
- Oliver Goldsmith – Essays
- William Kenrick – A Review of Doctor Johnson's New Edition of Shakespeare
- Filip Lastrić
  - Epitome vetustatum Bosnensis provinciae
  - Od uzame
- Friedrich Christoph Oetinger – Swedenborg und anderer Irrdische und himmlische Philosophie
- Joseph Priestley – Essay on a Course of Liberal Education for Civil and Active Life
- George Alexander Stevens – The Celebrated Lecture on Heads
- Tobias Smollett – Continuation of the History of England (a supplement to Hume's History of England; final volume)
- Pedro Rodríguez, Conde de Campomanes – Tratado de la regalía de amortización

== Births ==
- January 11 – Antoine Alexandre Barbier, French librarian (died 1825)
- March 27 – Franz Xaver von Baader, German philosopher (died 1841)
- April 22 – James Grahame, Scottish poet (died 1811)
- September 14 – Carl Friedrich Ernst Frommann, German bookseller (died 1837)
- September 15 – Manuel Maria Barbosa du Bocage, Portuguese poet (died 1805)
- October 24 – James Mackintosh, Scottish historian (died 1832)
- November 30 – Johann Friedrich Abegg, German theologian (died 1840)
- unknown date – Jippensha Ikku (十返舎 一九 Shigeta Sadakazu), Japanese novelist (died 1831)
- Probable year of birth – Henry Luttrell, English wit (died 1851)

== Deaths ==
- March 3 – William Stukeley, English antiquary (born 1687)
- April 5 – Edward Young, English poet, playwright and literary theorist (born 1683)
- April 11 – Lewis Morris, Welsh poet, antiquary and lexicographer (born 1701)
- April 15 – Mikhail Lomonosov, Russian polymath (born 1711)
- April 23 – Sarah Dixon, English poet (born 1671 or 1672)
- May 1 – Franz Neumayr, German controversialist and theologian (born 1697)
- December 31 – Samuel Madden, Irish social and political writer (born 1686)
- Unknown date
  - David Mallet, Scottish poet and playwright (born c. 1705)
  - James Ridley (Sir Charles Morell), English novelist and story writer (born 1736)

== Sources ==
- Boussuge, Emmanuel. "La chronologie de l'Encyclopédie interdite: Les dix derniers volumes: Tomes VIII a XVII (1762–1765)". Dix-huitième siècle 52 (2020): 287–302.
- Weil, F. "L'impression des tomes VIII à XVII de l'Encyclopédie". Recherches sur Diderot et sur l'Encyclopédie 1 (1986): 85–93.
