= Augustan literature =

Style of British literature

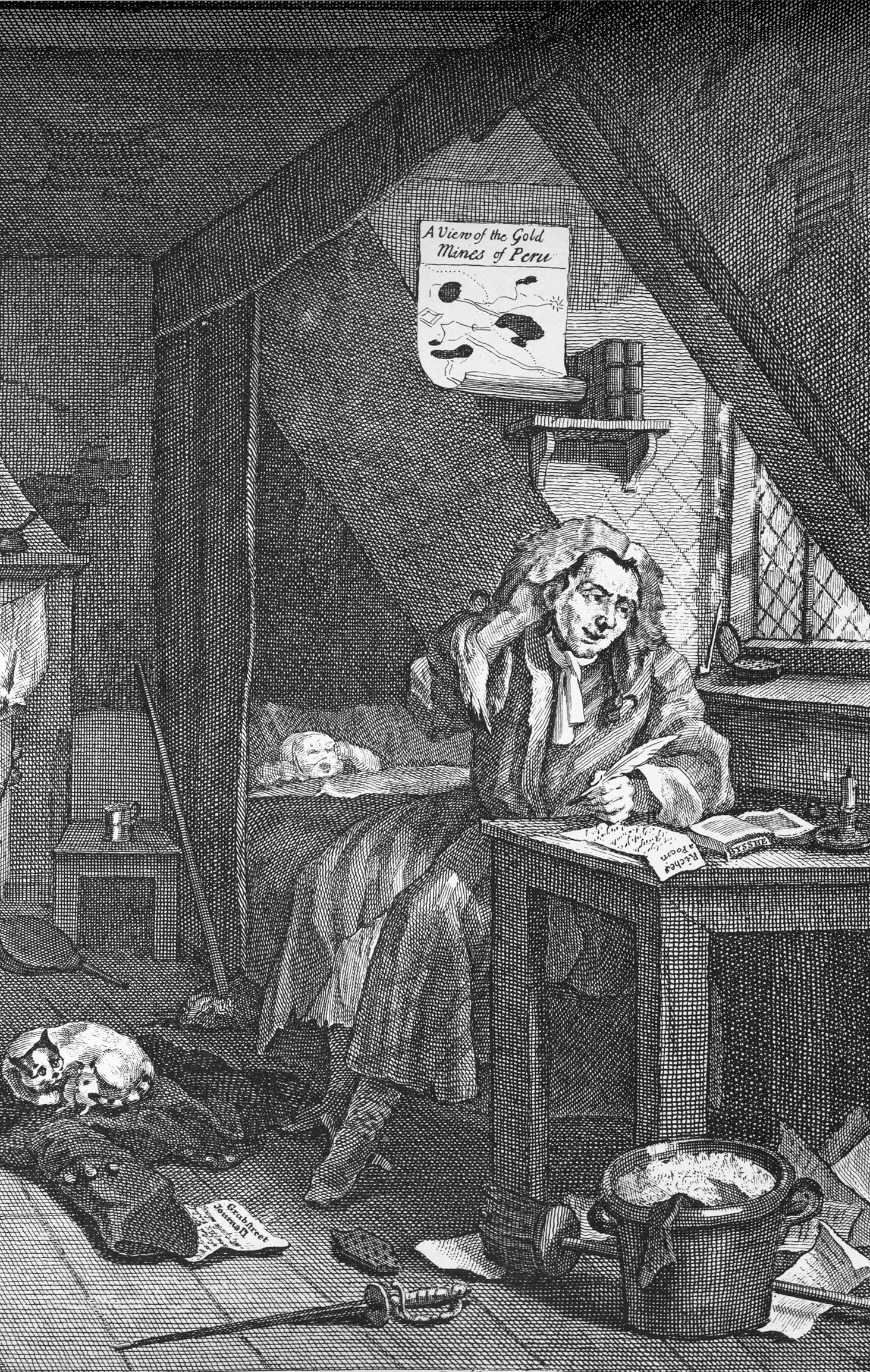
The Distrest Poet, William Hogarth's portrait of a Grub Street poet starving to death and trying to write a new poem to get money. The "hack" (hired) writer was a response to the newly increased demand for reading matter in the Augustan period.

Augustan literature (sometimes referred to misleadingly as Georgian literature) is a style of British literature produced during the reigns of Queen Anne, King George I, and George II in the first half of the 18th century and ending in the 1740s, with the deaths of Alexander Pope and Jonathan Swift, in 1744 and 1745, respectively. It was a literary epoch that featured the rapid development of the novel, an explosion in satire, the mutation of drama from political satire into melodrama and an evolution toward poetry of personal exploration. In philosophy, it was an age increasingly dominated by empiricism, while in the writings of political economy, it marked the evolution of mercantilism as a formal philosophy, the development of capitalism and the triumph of trade.

The chronological boundary points of the era are generally vague, largely since the label's origin in contemporary 18th-century criticism has made it a shorthand designation for a somewhat nebulous age of satire. Samuel Johnson, whose famous A Dictionary of the English Language was published in 1755, is also "to some extent" associated with the Augustan period. The new Augustan period exhibited exceptionally bold political writings in all genres, with the satires of the age marked by an arch, ironic pose, full of nuance and a superficial air of dignified calm that hid sharp criticisms beneath.

While the period is generally known for its adoption of highly regulated and stylized literary forms, some of the concerns of writers of this period, with the emotions, folk and a self-conscious model of authorship, foreshadowed the preoccupations of the later Romantic era. In general, philosophy, politics and literature underwent a turn away from older courtly concerns towards something closer to a modern sensibility.

== Historical context ==
In 1737, Alexander Pope, published Imitations of Horace, commonly known as Epistle to Augustus, that was in fact addressed to King George II (whose name was George Augustus). It seemingly endorsed the notion of his age being like that of Augustus (r. 27 BC – AD 14), when Latin poetry became more mannered, political, and satirical than in the era of Julius Caesar (70s–44 BC). Later, Voltaire and Oliver Goldsmith (in his History of Literature in 1764) used the term "Augustan" to refer to the literature of the 1720s and the 1730s.

Outside poetry, however, the Augustan era is generally known by other names. Partially because of the rise of empiricism and partially because of the self-conscious naming of the age in terms of ancient Rome, two rather imprecise labels have been affixed to the age. One is that it is the age of neoclassicism; the other is that it is the Age of Reason. While neoclassical criticism from France was imported to English letters, the English had abandoned their structures in all but name by the 1720s. Critics disagree over the applicability of the concept of "the Enlightenment" to the literary history of this period. Donald Greene argued forcefully that the age should rather be known as "The Age of Exuberance", and T. H. White made a case for "The Age of Scandal". More recently, Roy Porter put forward the notion of a distinctively "English Enlightenment" to characterise the intellectual climate of the period.

An auctioneer sells books from the estate of a condemned doctor, about 1700, in Moorfields. The books contain pornography, medicine, and classics. The print satirises "new men" wanting to collect libraries without collecting learning.

One of the most critical elements of the 18th century was the increasing availability of printed material, both for readers and authors. Books fell in price dramatically and used books were sold at Bartholomew Fair and other fairs. Additionally, a brisk trade in chapbooks and broadsheets carried London trends and information out to the farthest reaches of the kingdom. That was furthered with the establishment of periodicals, including The Gentleman's Magazine and the London Magazine. People in York aware of the happenings of Parliament and the court, but people in London were also more aware than before of the happenings of York. Furthermore, before copyright, pirate editions were commonplace, especially in areas without frequent contact with London. Pirate editions thereby encouraged booksellers to increase their shipments to outlying centres like Dublin, which further increased awareness across the whole realm. That was compounded by the expiry of the Licensing of the Press Act 1662 in 1695, which allowed for provincial printing presses to be established, creating a printing structure that was no longer under government control.

All types of literature were spread quickly in all directions. Newspapers began and even multiplied. Furthermore, the newspapers were immediately compromised, as the political factions created their own newspapers, planted stories and bribed journalists. Leading clerics had their sermon collections printed, which were top selling books. Since dissenting, Establishment and Independent divines were in print, the constant movement of these works helped defuse any region's religious homogeneity and fostered emergent latitudinarianism. Periodicals were exceedingly popular, and the art of essay writing was at nearly its apex. Furthermore, the happenings of the Royal Society were published regularly, and they were digested and explained or celebrated in more popular presses. The latest books of scholarship had "keys", "indexes" and "digests" made of them that could popularise, summarise and explain them to a wide audience. The cross-index, now commonplace, was a novelty in the 18th century, and several persons created indexes for older books of learning to allow anyone to find what an author had to say about a given topic at a moment's notice. Books of etiquette, of correspondence and of moral instruction and hygiene multiplied. Economics began as a serious discipline but did so in the form of numerous "projects" for solving England, Ireland and Scotland's ills. Sermon collections, dissertations on religious controversy, and prophecies, both new and old and explained, cropped up in endless variety. In short, readers in the 18th century were overwhelmed by competing voices. Truth and falsehood sat side by side on the shelves, and anyone could be a published author, just as anyone could quickly pretend to be a scholar by using indexes and digests.

The positive side of the explosion in information was that the 18th century was markedly more generally educated than the centuries before. Education was less confined to the upper classes than it had been in prior centuries so contributions to science, philosophy, economics, and literature came from all parts of the kingdom. It was the first time that literacy and a library were all that stood between a person and education. It was an age of "enlightenment" in the sense that the insistence and drive for reasonable explanations of nature and mankind was a rage. It was an "age of reason" in that it was an age that accepted clear, rational methods as superior to tradition. However, there was a dark side to such literacy as well, which authors of the 18th century felt at every turn, which was that nonsense and insanity were also getting more adherents than ever before. Charlatans and mountebanks were fooling more, just as sages were educating more, and alluring and lurid apocalypses vied with sober philosophy on the shelves. As with the World Wide Web in the 21st century, the democratisation of publishing meant that older systems for determining value and uniformity of view were both in shambles. Thus, it was increasingly difficult to trust books in the 18th century, as books were increasingly easy to make and buy.

=== Political and religious context ===
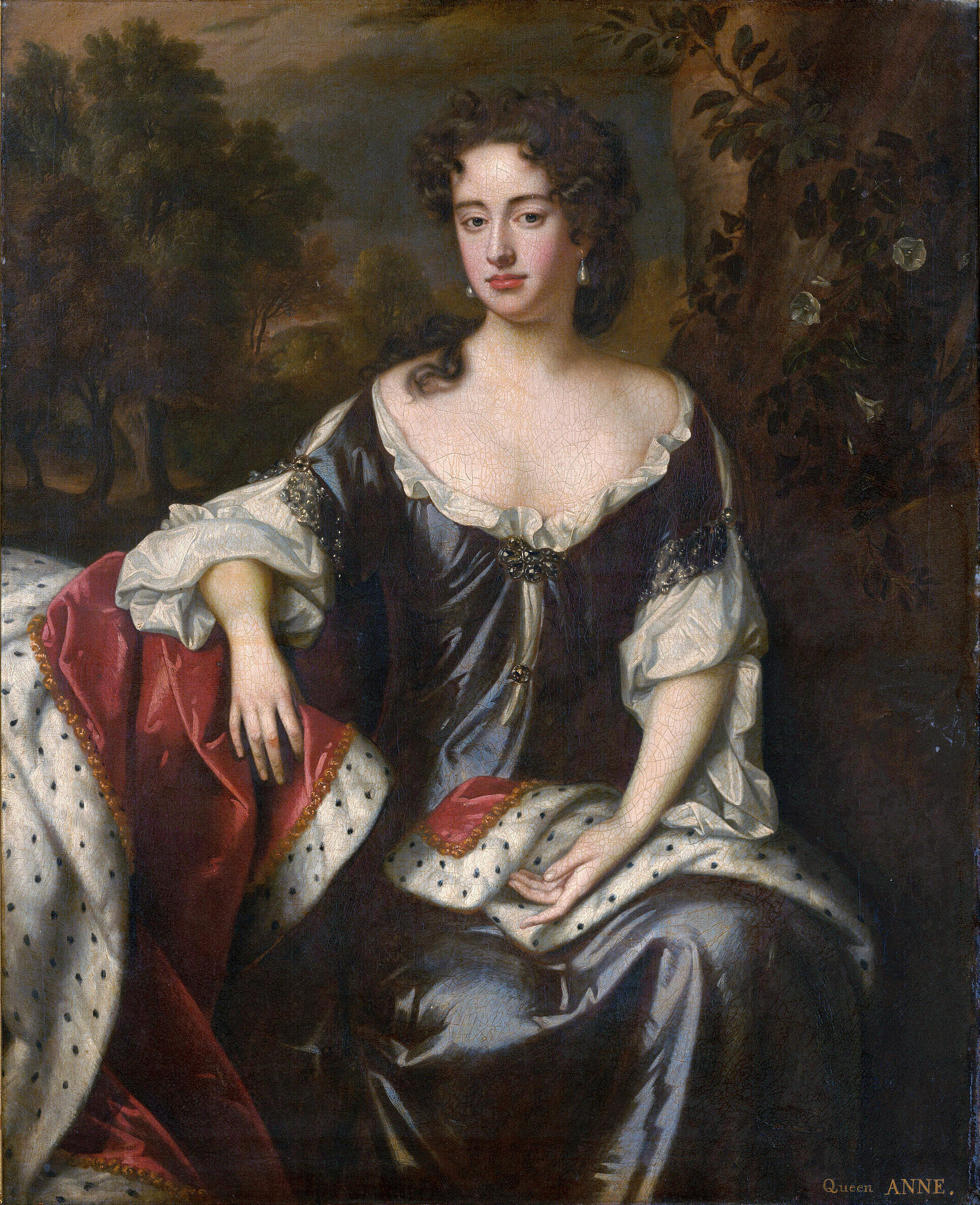
Queen Anne

The Restoration period ended with the exclusion crisis and the Glorious Revolution, where Parliament set up a new rule for succession to the British throne that would always prefer Protestantism over consanguinity. That had brought William III and Mary II to the throne instead of James II, and that was codified in the Act of Settlement 1701. James had fled to France from where his son, James Francis Edward Stuart, launched an attempt to retake the throne in 1715. Another attempt was launched by the latter's son Charles Edward Stuart in 1745. The attempted invasions are often referred to as "the 15" and "the 45". When William died, Anne Stuart came to the throne. Anne's reign saw two wars and great triumphs by John Churchill, the Duke of Marlborough. Marlborough's wife, Sarah Churchill, was Anne's best friend, and many supposed that she secretly controlled the Queen in every respect. With the belief that true power rested in the hands of the leading ministers, the two factions of politics stepped up their opposition to each other, and Whig and Tory were at each other's throats. That weakness at the throne would lead quickly to the expansion of the powers of the party leader in Parliament and the establishment in all but name of the prime minister office in the form of Robert Walpole. When Anne died without a surviving issue, George I, Elector of Hanover, came to the throne. George I spoke poor English, and his isolation from the English people was instrumental in keeping his power relatively irrelevant.

His son, George II, on the other hand, spoke some English and some more French, and his rule was the first full Hanoverian rule in England. By then, the powers of Parliament had silently expanded, and his power was perhaps only equal to that of Parliament.

London's population exploded spectacularly. During the Restoration, it had grown from around 350,000 to 600,000 in 1700 (Old Bailey) (Millwall history). By 1800, it had reached 950,000. Not all of the residents were prosperous, as the inclosure acts had destroyed lower-class farming in the countryside, and rural areas experienced painful poverty. Communities of the country poor were forced to migrate or suffer (see Thompson, Whigs) so young people from the country often moved to London with hopes of achieving success, which swelled the ranks of the urban poor and cheap labour for city employers. It also meant an increase in numbers of criminals, prostitutes and beggars. The fears of property crime, rape and starvation found in Augustan literature should be kept in the context of London's growth and the depopulation of the countryside.

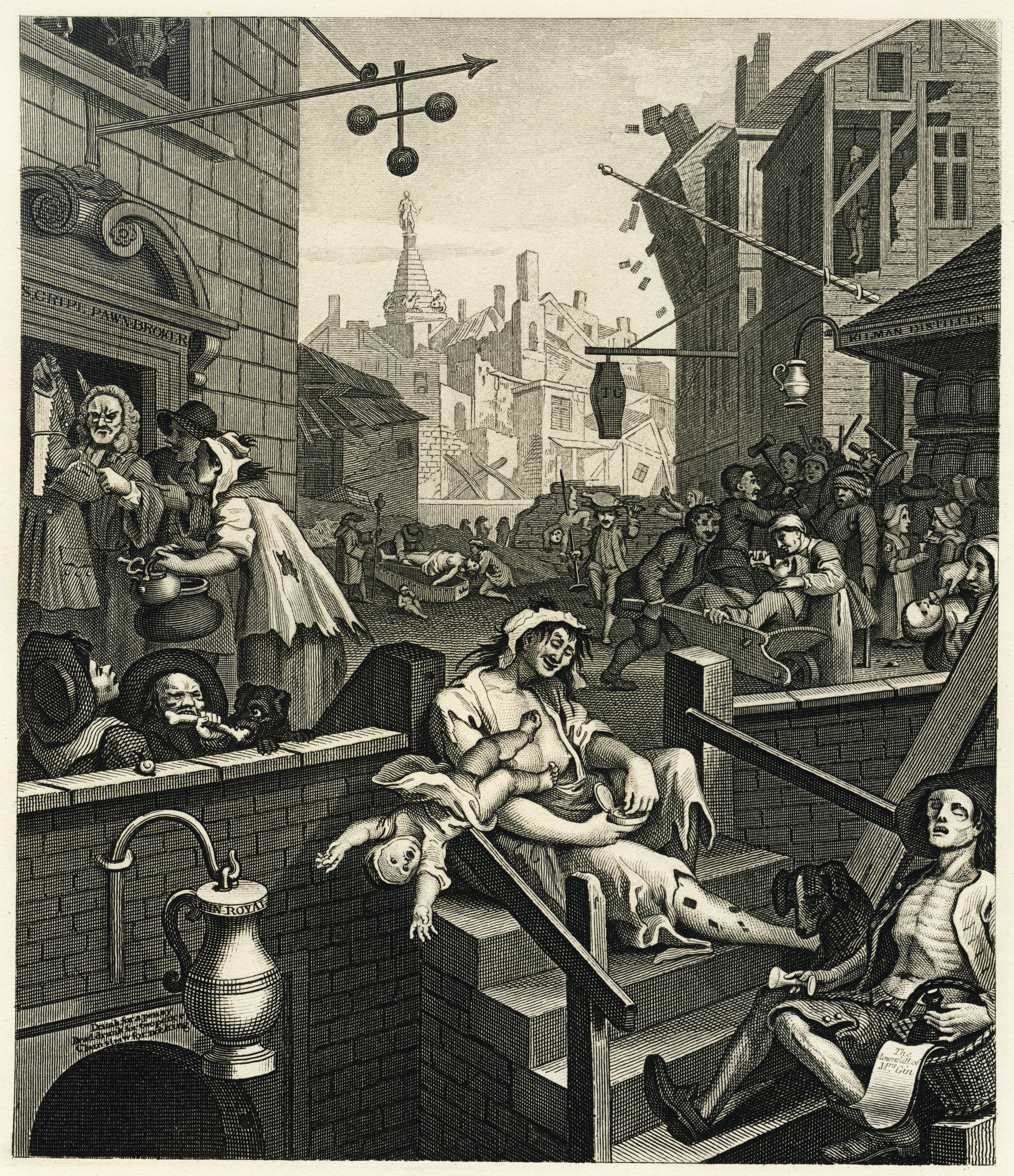
William Hogarth's Gin Lane is not entirely caricature, as in 1750, over a fourth of all houses in St Giles were gin shops, all unlicensed.

Partially because of the population pressures, property crime became a business both for the criminals and those who fed off of the criminals. Major crime lords like Jonathan Wild invented new schemes for stealing, and newspapers were eager to report crime. Biographies of the daring criminals became popular, which spawned fictional biographies of fictional criminals. Cautionary tales of country women abused by sophisticated rakes (such as Anne Bond) and libertines in the city were popular fare, and they prompted fictional accounts of exemplary women abused (or narrowly escaping abuse).

Increased population also meant that urban discontent was never particularly difficult to find for political opportunists, and London suffered a number of riots, most of them against supposed Roman Catholic provocateurs. When highly potent, inexpensive distilled spirits were introduced, matters worsened and authors and artists protested the innovation of gin (see, e.g. William Hogarth's Gin Lane). From 1710, the government encouraged distilling as a source of revenue and trade goods, and there were no licences required for the manufacturing or selling of gin. There were documented instances of women drowning their infants to sell the child's clothes for gin, and the facilities created both the fodder for riots and the conditions against which riots would occur. Dissenters (Protestants not conforming to the Church of England) recruited and preached to the poor of the city, and various offshoots of the Puritan and "Independent" (Baptist) movements increased their numbers substantially. One theme of the ministers was the danger of the Roman Catholic Church, which they frequently saw as the Whore of Babylon. While Anne tended to favour the High Church faction, particularly towards the close of her reign, the court of George I was more closely allied with Low Church and latitudinarian elements and was warmer to nonconformists. The convocation was effectively disbanded by George I, who was struggling with the House of Lords, and George II was pleased to keep it in abeyance. Additionally, both Georges were concerned with James Francis Edward Stuart and Charles Edward Stuart, who had considerable support in Scotland and Ireland, and many were suspected of being closet Jacobites. Walpole inflated fears of Stuart sympathisers from any group that did not support him.

=== History and literature ===
The literature of the 18th century, particularly the early 18th century, which is what "Augustan" most commonly indicates, is explicitly political in ways that few others are. Because the professional author was still not distinguishable from the hack-writer, those who wrote poetry, novels, and plays were frequently either politically active or politically funded. At the same time, an aesthetic of artistic detachment from the everyday world had yet to develop, and the aristocratic ideal of an author so noble as to be above political concerns was largely archaic and irrelevant. The period may be an "Age of Scandal", as authors dealt specifically with the crimes and the vices of their world.

Satire, in prose, drama and poetry, was the genre that attracted the most energetic and voluminous writing. The satires that were produced during the Augustan period were occasionally gentle and nonspecific, commentaries on the comically flawed human condition, but they were at least as frequently specific critiques of specific policies, actions and persons. Even the works studiously nontopical were, in fact, transparently political statements in the 18th century.

Consequently, readers of 18th-century literature now need to understand the history of the period more than most readers of other literature do. The authors were writing for an informed audience and only secondarily for posterity. Even the authors, who criticised writing that lived for only a day (like Jonathan Swift and Alexander Pope, in The Dedication to Prince Posterity of A Tale of a Tub and The Dunciad, among other pieces) were criticising specific authors, who are unknown to those without historical knowledge of the period. Poetry of all forms was in constant dialogue, and each author was responding and commenting upon the others. Novels were written against other novels (like the battles between Samuel Richardson and Henry Fielding, who, along with Eliza Haywood, wrote a novel satirising Richardson's Pamela, and between Laurence Sterne and Tobias Smollett). Plays were written to make fun of plays or to counter the success of plays (like the reaction against and for Cato and, later, Fielding's The Author's Farce). Therefore, history and literature are linked in a way rarely seen at other times. On one hand, the metropolitan and political writing can seem like coterie or salon work, but on the other hand, it was the literature of people deeply committed to sorting out a new type of government, new technologies and newly-vexatious challenges to philosophical and religious certainty.

== Prose ==
An engraved ticket for Francis Woods's circulating library in London from some time after mid-century.

The essay, satire, and dialogue (in philosophy and religion) thrived in the age, and the English novel was truly begun as a serious art form. Literacy in the early 18th century passed into the working classes, as well as the middle and upper classes (Thompson, Class). Furthermore, literacy was not confined to men, though rates of female literacy are very difficult to establish. For those who were literate, circulating libraries in England began in the Augustan period. Libraries were open to all, but they were mainly associated with female patronage and novel reading.

=== Essays and journalism ===
English essayists were aware of Continental models, but they developed their form independently from that tradition, and periodical literature grew between 1692 and 1712. Periodicals were inexpensive to produce, quick to read, and a viable way of influencing public opinion, and consequently there were many broadsheet periodicals headed by a single author and staffed by hirelings (so-called "Grub Street" authors). One periodical outsold and dominated all others, however, and that was The Spectator, written by Joseph Addison and Richard Steele (with occasional contributions from their friends). The Spectator developed a number of pseudonymous characters, including "Mr. Spectator," Roger de Coverley, and "Isaac Bickerstaff", and both Addison and Steele created fictions to surround their narrators. The dispassionate view of the world (the pose of a spectator, rather than participant) was essential for the development of the English essay, as it set out a ground wherein Addison and Steele could comment and meditate upon manners and events. Samuel Johnson's command of words and his practical wisdom gained a following as he published more than 200 essays offering insights into the follies of human nature and moral perseverance. Rather than being philosophers like Montesquieu, the English essayist could be an honest observer and his reader's peer. After the success of The Spectator, more political periodicals of comment appeared. However, the political factions and coalitions of politicians very quickly realized the power of this type of press, and they began funding newspapers to spread rumours. The Tory ministry of Robert Harley (1710–1714) reportedly spent over 50,000 pounds sterling on creating and bribing the press (Butt); this figure is known because their successors publicised it, but they (the Walpole government) were suspected of spending even more. Politicians wrote papers, wrote into papers, and supported papers, and it was well known that some of the periodicals, like Mist's Journal, were party mouthpieces.

=== Dictionaries and Lexicons ===
The 18th century was a time of enlightenment progression occurring in all intellectual fields. However, the English language was deteriorating into a tangled mess. A group of London booksellers commissioned well-known essayist Samuel Johnson to compile a set of rules governing the English language. After nine years and the help of six assistants the first edition of A Dictionary of the English Language was published in 1755. Johnson's great knowledge of letters, words and literature brought uniqueness to his dictionary. Each word defined in detail, with descriptions of their various uses and numerous literary quotes as illustrations. This was the first dictionary of its kind, containing 40,000 words and nearly 114,000 quotes packed together with Johnson's personal touch. A warm reception greeted Johnson's Dictionary as it was the first dictionary that could be read with pleasure. The definitions full of wit and depth of thought supported by passages from beloved poets and philosophers, which a reader could be content spending an evening poring over its pages. Johnson's choice of structure and format has certainly shaped future English dictionaries and lexicons and the role they play in language development.

=== Philosophy and religious writing ===
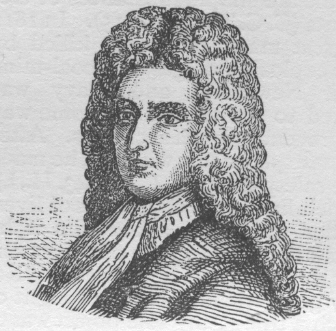
A woodcut of Daniel Defoe

The Augustan period showed less literature of controversy than the Restoration. There were Puritan authors, however, and one of the names usually associated with the novel is perhaps the most prominent in Puritan writing: Daniel Defoe. After the coronation of Anne, dissenter hopes of reversing the Restoration were at an ebb, and dissenter literature moved from the offensive to the defensive, from revolutionary to conservative. Defoe's infamous volley in the struggle between high and low church came in the form of The Shortest Way with the Dissenters; Or, Proposals for the Establishment of the Church. The work is satirical, attacking all of the worries of Establishment figures over the challenges of dissenters. It is, in other words, defensive. Later still, the most majestic work of the era, and the one most quoted and read, was William Law's A Serious Call to a Devout and Holy Life (1728). The Meditations of Robert Boyle remained popular as well. Both Law and Boyle called for revivalism, and they set the stage for the later development of Methodism and George Whitefield's sermon style. However, their works aimed at the individual, rather than the community. The age of revolutionary divines and militant evangelists in literature was over for a considerable time.

Also in contrast to the Restoration, when philosophy in England was fully dominated by John Locke, the 18th century had a vigorous competition among followers of Locke. Bishop Berkeley extended Locke's emphasis on perception to argue that perception entirely solves the Cartesian problem of subjective and objective knowledge by saying "to be is to be perceived". Only those things, Berkeley argued, that are perceived by a consciousness are real. For Berkeley, the persistence of matter rests in the fact that God perceives those things that humans do not, that a living and continually aware, attentive, and involved God is the only rational explanation for the existence of objective matter. In essence, then, Berkeley's scepticism leads to faith. David Hume, on the other hand, took empiricist scepticism to its extremes, and he was the most radically empiricist philosopher of the period. He attacked surmised and unexamined premises wherever he found them, and his scepticism pointed out metaphysics in areas that other empiricists had assumed were material. Hume doggedly refused to enter into questions of his personal faith in the divine, but he assaulted the logic and assumptions of theodicy and cosmogeny, and he concentrated on the provable and empirical in a way that would lead to utilitarianism and naturalism later.

In social and political philosophy, economics underlies much of the debate. Bernard de Mandeville's The Fable of the Bees (1714) became a centre-point of controversy regarding trade, morality, and social ethics. Mandeville argued that wastefulness, lust, pride, and all the other "private" vices were good for the society at large, for each led the individual to employ others, to spend freely, and to free capital to flow through the economy. Mandeville's work is full of paradox and is meant, at least partially, to problematize what he saw as the naïve philosophy of human progress and inherent virtue. However, Mandeville's arguments, initially an attack on graft of the War of the Spanish Succession, would be quoted often by economists who wished to strip morality away from questions of trade.

==== After 1750 ====
Adam Smith is remembered by lay persons as the father of capitalism, but his Theory of Moral Sentiments of 1759 also attempted to strike out a new ground for moral action. His emphasis on "sentiment" was in keeping with the era, as he emphasised the need for "sympathy" between individuals as the basis of fit action. These ideas, and the psychology of David Hartley, were influential on the sentimental novel and even the nascent Methodist movement. If sympathetic sentiment communicated morality, would it not be possible to induce morality by providing sympathetic circumstances?

Smith's greatest work was An Inquiry into the Nature and Causes of the Wealth of Nations in 1776. What it held in common with de Mandeville, Hume, and Locke was that it began by analytically examining the history of material exchange, without reflection on morality. Instead of deducing from the ideal or moral to the real, it examined the real and tried to formulate inductive rules.

=== The novel ===
The ground for the novel had been laid by journalism, drama and satire. Long prose satires like Swift's Gulliver's Travels (1726) had a central character who goes through adventures and may (or may not) learn lessons. However, the most important single satirical source for the writing of novels came from Cervantes's Don Quixote (1605, 1615). In general, one can see these three axes, drama, journalism and satire, as blending in and giving rise to three different types of novel.

Daniel Defoe's Robinson Crusoe (1719) was the first major novel of the new century and was published in more editions than any other works besides Gulliver's Travels (Mullan 252). Defoe worked as a journalist during and after its composition, and therefore he encountered the memoirs of Alexander Selkirk, who had been stranded in South America on an island for some years. Defoe took aspects of the actual life and, from that, generated a fictional life, satisfying an essentially journalistic market with his fiction (Hunter 331–338). In the 1720s, Defoe interviewed famed criminals and produced accounts of their lives. In particular, he investigated Jack Sheppard and Jonathan Wild and wrote True Accounts of the former's escapes (and fate) and the latter's life. From his reportage on the prostitutes and criminals, Defoe may have become familiar with the real-life Mary Mollineaux, who may have been the model for Moll in Moll Flanders (1722). In the same year, Defoe produced A Journal of the Plague Year (1722), which summoned up the horrors and tribulations of 1665 for a journalistic market for memoirs, and an attempted tale of a working-class male rise in Colonel Jack (1722). His last novel returned to the theme of fallen women in Roxana (1724). Thematically, Defoe's works are consistently Puritan. They all involve a fall, a degradation of the spirit, a conversion, and an ecstatic elevation. This religious structure necessarily involved a bildungsroman, for each character had to learn a lesson about him or herself and emerge the wiser.

==== After 1740: Sentimental novel ====
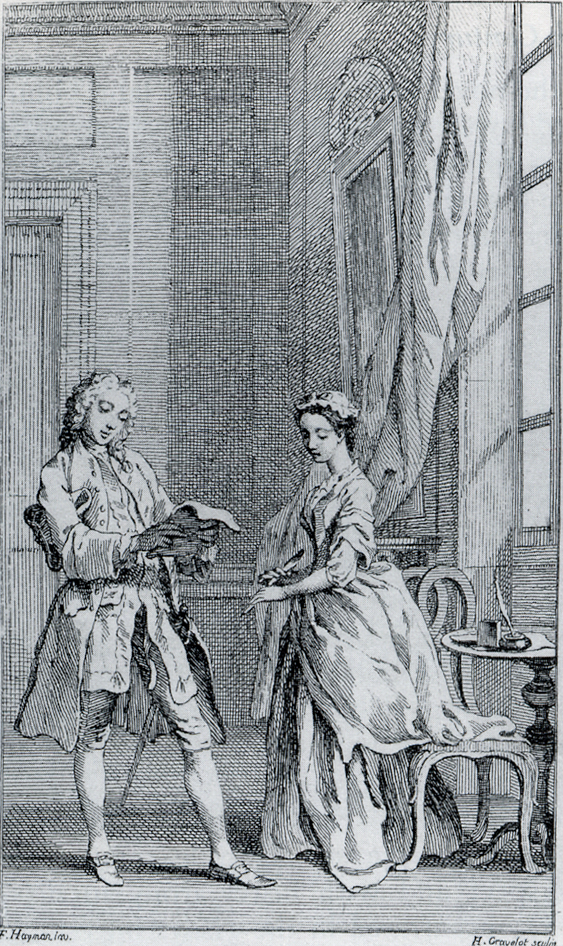
A plate from the 1742 deluxe edition of Richardson's Pamela; or, Virtue Rewarded showing Mr. B intercepting Pamela's first letter home to her mother

The sentimental novel, or "novel of sentiment", developed after 1740, and among the most famous examples in English are Samuel Richardson's Pamela, or Virtue Rewarded (1740), Oliver Goldsmith's Vicar of Wakefield (1766), Laurence Sterne's Tristram Shandy (1759–67), Sentimental Journey (1768), Henry Brooke's The Fool of Quality (1765–70), Henry Mackenzie's The Man of Feeling (1771) and Maria Edgeworth's Castle Rackrent (1800). Continental examples are Jean-Jacques Rousseau's novel Julie, or the New Heloise, his autobiography The Confessions (1764–70) and Goethe's novel The Sorrows of Young Werther (1774).

Although there were novels in the interim, Samuel Richardson's Pamela; or, Virtue Rewarded (1740) is the next landmark development in the English novel. Richardson's generic models were quite distinct from those of Defoe. Instead of working from the journalistic biography, Richardson had in mind the books of improvement that were popular at the time. Pamela Andrews enters the employ of a "Mr. B". As a dutiful girl, she writes to her mother constantly, and as a Christian girl, she is always on guard for her "virtue" (i.e. her virginity), for Mr. B lusts after her. The novel ends with her marriage to her employer and her rising to the position of lady. Pamela, like its author, presents a dissenter's and a Whig's view of the rise of the classes. The work drew a nearly instantaneous set of satires, of which Henry Fielding's Shamela, or an Apology for the Life of Miss Shamela Andrews (1742) is the most memorable. Fielding continued to bait Richardson with Joseph Andrews (1742), the tale of Shamela's brother, Joseph, who goes through his life trying to protect his own virginity, thus reversing the sexual predation of Richardson and satirizing the idea of sleeping one's way to rank. However, Joseph Andrews is not a parody of Richardson, for Fielding proposed his belief in "good nature", which is a quality of inherent virtue that is independent of class and which can always prevail. Joseph's friend Parson Adams, although not a fool, is a naïf and possessing good nature. His own basic good nature blinds him to the wickedness of the world, and the incidents on the road (for most of the novel is a travel story) allow Fielding to satirize conditions for the clergy, rural poverty (and squires), and the viciousness of businessmen.

In 1747 through 1748, Samuel Richardson published Clarissa; or, The History of a Young Lady in serial form. Unlike Pamela, it is not a tale of virtue rewarded. Instead, it is a highly tragic and affecting account of a young girl whose parents try to force her into an uncongenial marriage, thus pushing her into the arms of a scheming rake named Lovelace. In the end, Clarissa dies by her own will. The novel is a masterpiece of psychological realism and emotional effect, and when Richardson was drawing to a close in the serial publication, even Henry Fielding wrote to him, begging him not to kill Clarissa. As with Pamela, Richardson emphasized the individual over the social and the personal over the class. Even as Fielding was reading and enjoying Clarissa, he was also writing a counter to its messages. His Tom Jones of 1749 offers up the other side of the argument from Clarissa. Tom Jones agrees substantially in the power of the individual to be more or less than his or her birth would indicate, but it again emphasizes the place of the individual in society and the social ramifications of individual choices. Fielding answers Richardson by featuring a similar plot device (whether a girl can choose her own mate) but showing how family and village can complicate and expedite matches and felicity.

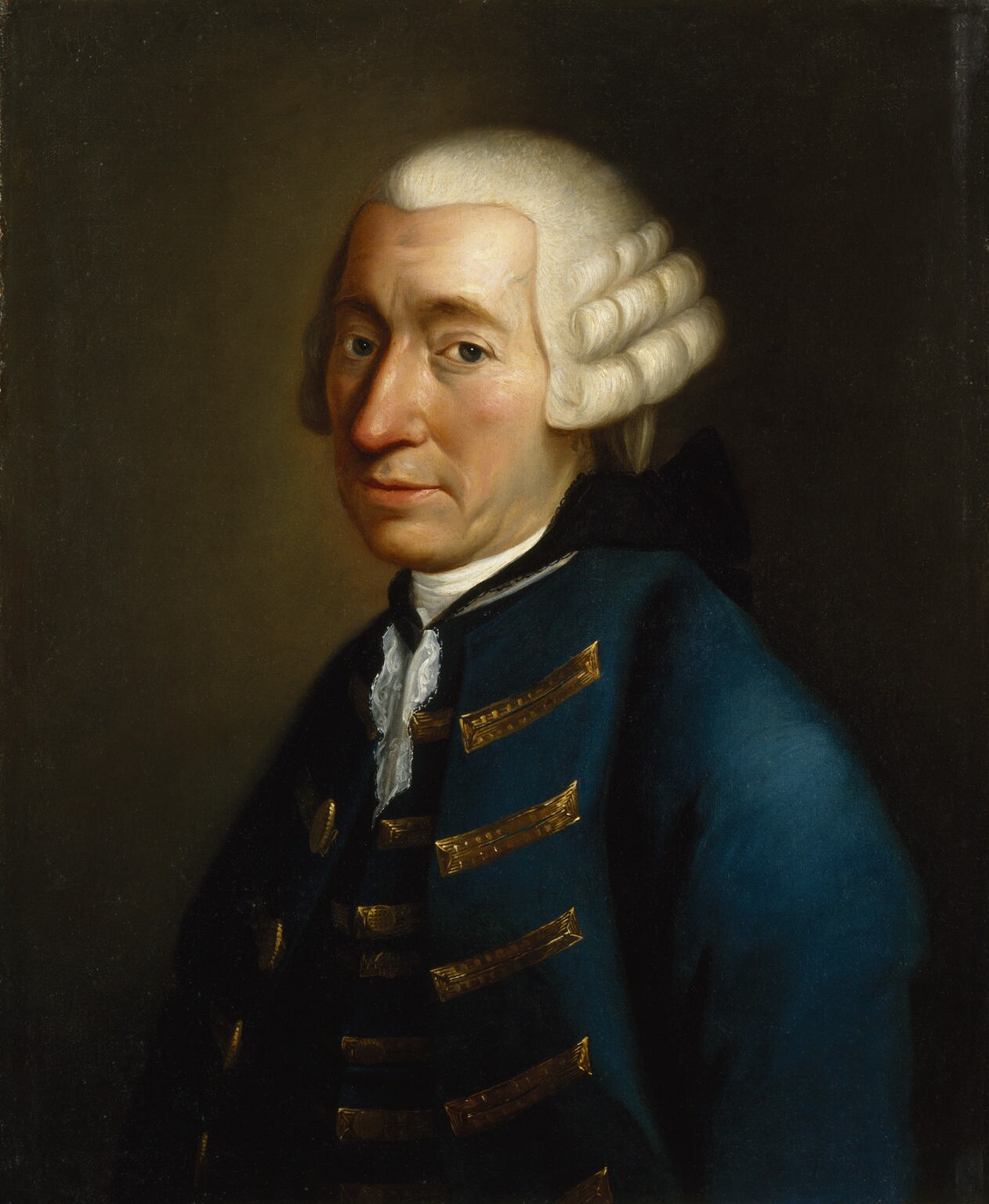
A portrait of Tobias Smollett

Two other novelists should be mentioned, for they, like Fielding and Richardson, were in dialogue through their works. Laurence Sterne's and Tobias Smollett's works offered up oppositional views of the self in society and the method of the novel. The clergyman Laurence Sterne consciously set out to imitate Jonathan Swift with his Tristram Shandy (1759–1767). Tristram seeks to write his autobiography, but like Swift's narrator in A Tale of a Tub, he worries that nothing in his life can be understood without understanding its context. For example, he tells the reader that at the very moment he was conceived, his mother was saying, "Did you wind the clock?". To clarify how he knows this, he explains that his father took care of winding the clock and "other family business" on one day a month. To explain why the clock had to be wound then, he has to explain his father. In other words, the biography moves backward rather than forward in time, only to then jump forward years, hit another knot, and move backward again. It is a novel of exceptional energy, of multi-layered digressions, of multiple satires, and of frequent parodies. Journalist, translator and historian Tobias Smollett, on the other hand, wrote more seemingly traditional novels. He concentrated on the picaresque novel, where a low-born character would go through a practically endless series of adventures. Sterne thought that Smollett's novels always paid undue attention to the basest and most common elements of life, that they emphasized the dirt. Although this is a superficial complaint, it points to an important difference between the two as authors. Sterne came to the novel from a satirical background, while Smollett approached it from journalism. In the 19th century, novelists would have plots much nearer to Smollett's than either Fielding's or Sterne's or Richardson's, and his sprawling, linear development of action would prove most successful.

In the midst of this development of the novel, other trends were also taking place. Women were writing novels and moving away from the old romance plots that had dominated before the Restoration. There were utopian novels, like Sarah Scott's Millennium Hall (1762), autobiographical women's novels like Frances Burney's works, female adaptations of older, male motifs, such as Charlotte Lennox's The Female Quixote (1752) and many others. These novels do not generally follow a strict line of development or influence.

=== Satire ===
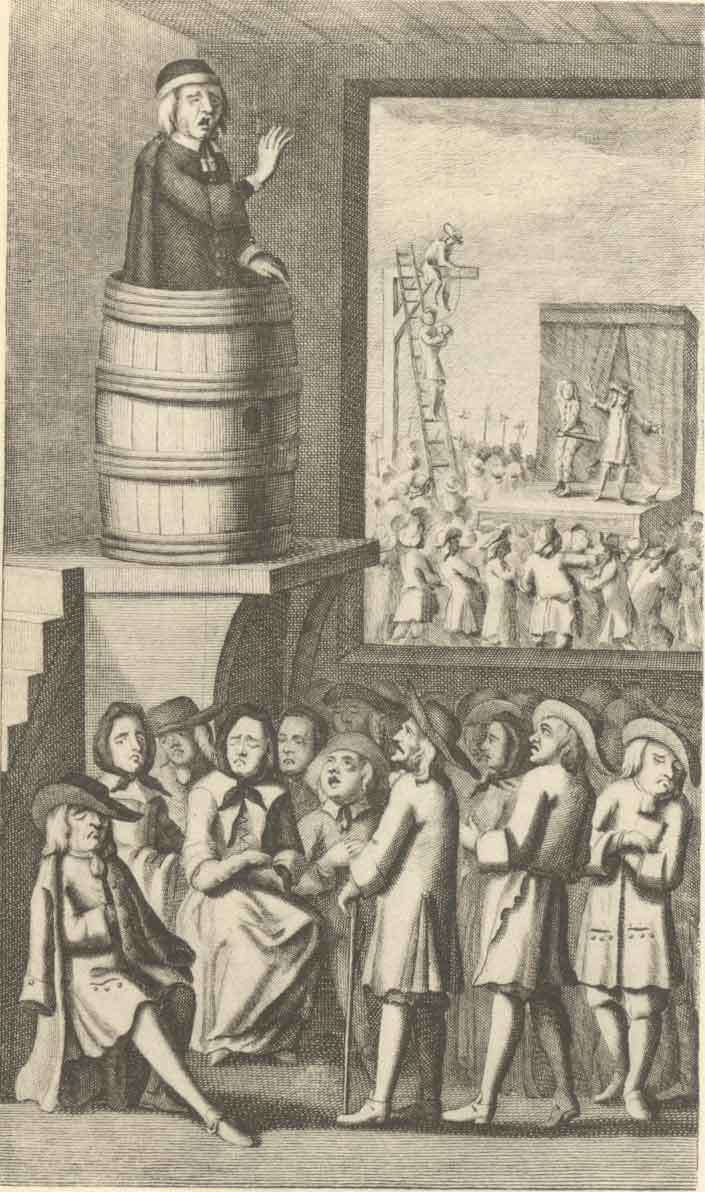
An illustration from Jonathan Swift's A Tale of a Tub showing the three "stages" of human life: the pulpit, the theatre, and the gallows

The Augustan era is considered a high point of British satiric writing, and its masterpieces were Swift's Gulliver's Travels and A Modest Proposal, Pope's Dunciads, Horatian Imitations, and Moral Essays, Samuel Johnson's The Vanity of Human Wishes and London, Henry Fielding's Shamela and Jonathan Wild, and John Gay's The Beggar's Opera. There were several thousand other satirical works written during the period, which have until recently been, by widespread consensus, ignored. The central group of "Scriblerians"—Pope, Swift, Gay, and their colleague John Arbuthnot—are considered to have had common satiric aims. Until recently, these writers formed a "school" of satire. After Swift and Pope died, the emergent "Age of Sensibility" discouraged the often cruel and abrasive tenor of the Augustans, and satire was rendered gentler and more diffuse.

Many scholars of the era argue that a single name overshadows all others in 18th-century prose satire: Jonathan Swift. Swift wrote poetry as well as prose, and his satires range over all topics. Critically, Swift's satire marked the development of prose parody away from simple satire or burlesque. A burlesque or lampoon in prose would imitate a despised author and quickly move to reductio ad absurdum by having the victim say things coarse or idiotic. On the other hand, other satires would argue against a habit, practice, or policy by making fun of its reach or composition or methods. What Swift did was to combine parody, with its imitation of form and style of another, and satire in prose. Swift's works would pretend to speak in the voice of an opponent and imitate the style of the opponent and have the parodic work itself be the satire. Swift's first major satire was A Tale of a Tub (1703–1705), which introduced an ancients/moderns division that would serve as a distinction between the old and new conception of value. The "moderns" sought trade, empirical science, the individual's reason above the society's, while the "ancients" believed in inherent and immanent value of birth, and the society over the individual's determinations of the good. In Swift's satire, the moderns come out looking insane and proud of their insanity, and dismissive of the value of history. In Swift's most significant satire, Gulliver's Travels (1726), autobiography, allegory, and philosophy mix together in the travels. Thematically, Gulliver's Travels is a critique of human vanity, of pride. Book one, the journey to Liliput, begins with the world as it is. Book two shows that the idealized nation of Brobdingnag with a philosopher king is no home for a contemporary Englishman. Book four depicts the land of the Houyhnhnms, a society of horses ruled by pure reason, where humanity itself is portrayed as a group of "yahoos" covered in filth and dominated by base desires. It shows that, indeed, the very desire for reason may be undesirable, and humans must struggle to be neither Yahoos nor Houyhnhnms, for book three shows what happens when reason is unleashed without any consideration of morality or utility (i.e. madness, ruin, and starvation).

There were other satirists who worked in a less virulent way, who took a bemused pose and only made lighthearted fun. Tom Brown, Ned Ward, and Tom D'Urfey were all satirists in prose and poetry whose works appeared in the early part of the Augustan age. Tom Brown's most famous work in this vein was Amusements Serious and Comical, Calculated for the Meridian of London (1700). Ned Ward's most memorable work was The London Spy (1704–1706). The London Spy, before The Spectator, took up the position of an observer and uncomprehendingly reporting back. Tom D'Urfey's Wit and Mirth: or Pills to Purge Melancholy (1719) was another satire that attempted to offer entertainment, rather than a specific bit of political action, in the form of coarse and catchy songs.

Particularly after Swift's success, parodic satire had an attraction for authors throughout the 18th century. A variety of factors created a rise in political writing and political satire, and Robert Walpole's success and domination of the House of Commons was a very effective proximal cause for polarized literature and thereby the rise of parodic satire. The parodic satire takes apart the cases and plans of policy without necessarily contrasting a normative or positive set of values. Therefore, it was an ideal method of attack for ironists and conservatives—those who would not be able to enunciate a set of values to change toward but could condemn present changes as ill-considered. Satire was present in all genres during the Augustan period. Perhaps primarily, satire was a part of political and religious debate. Every significant politician and political act had satires to attack it. Few of these were parodic satires, but parodic satires, too, emerged in political and religious debate. So omnipresent and powerful was satire in the Augustan age that more than one literary history has referred to it as the "Age of satire" in literature.

== Poetry ==
In the Augustan era, poets wrote in direct counterpoint and direct expansion of one another, with each poet writing satire when in opposition. There was a great struggle over the nature and role of the pastoral in the early part of the century, reflecting two simultaneous movements: the invention of the subjective self as a worthy topic, with the emergence of a priority on individual psychology, against the insistence on all acts of art being performance and public gesture designed for the benefit of society at large. The development seemingly agreed upon by both sides was a gradual adaptation of all forms of poetry from their older uses. Odes would cease to be encomium, ballads cease to be narratives, elegies cease to be sincere memorials, satires no longer be specific entertainments, parodies no longer be performance pieces without sting, song no longer be pointed, and the lyric would become a celebration of the individual rather than a lover's complaint. These developments can be seen as extensions of Protestantism, as Max Weber argued, for they represent a gradual increase in the implications of Martin Luther's doctrine of the priesthood of all believers, or they can be seen as a growth of the power and assertiveness of the bourgeoisie and an echo of the displacement of the worker from the home in growing industrialization, as Marxists such as E.P. Thompson have argued. It can be argued that the development of the subjective individual against the social individual was a natural reaction to trade over other methods of economic production. Whatever the prime cause, a largely conservative set of voices argued for a social person and largely emergent voices argued for the individual person.

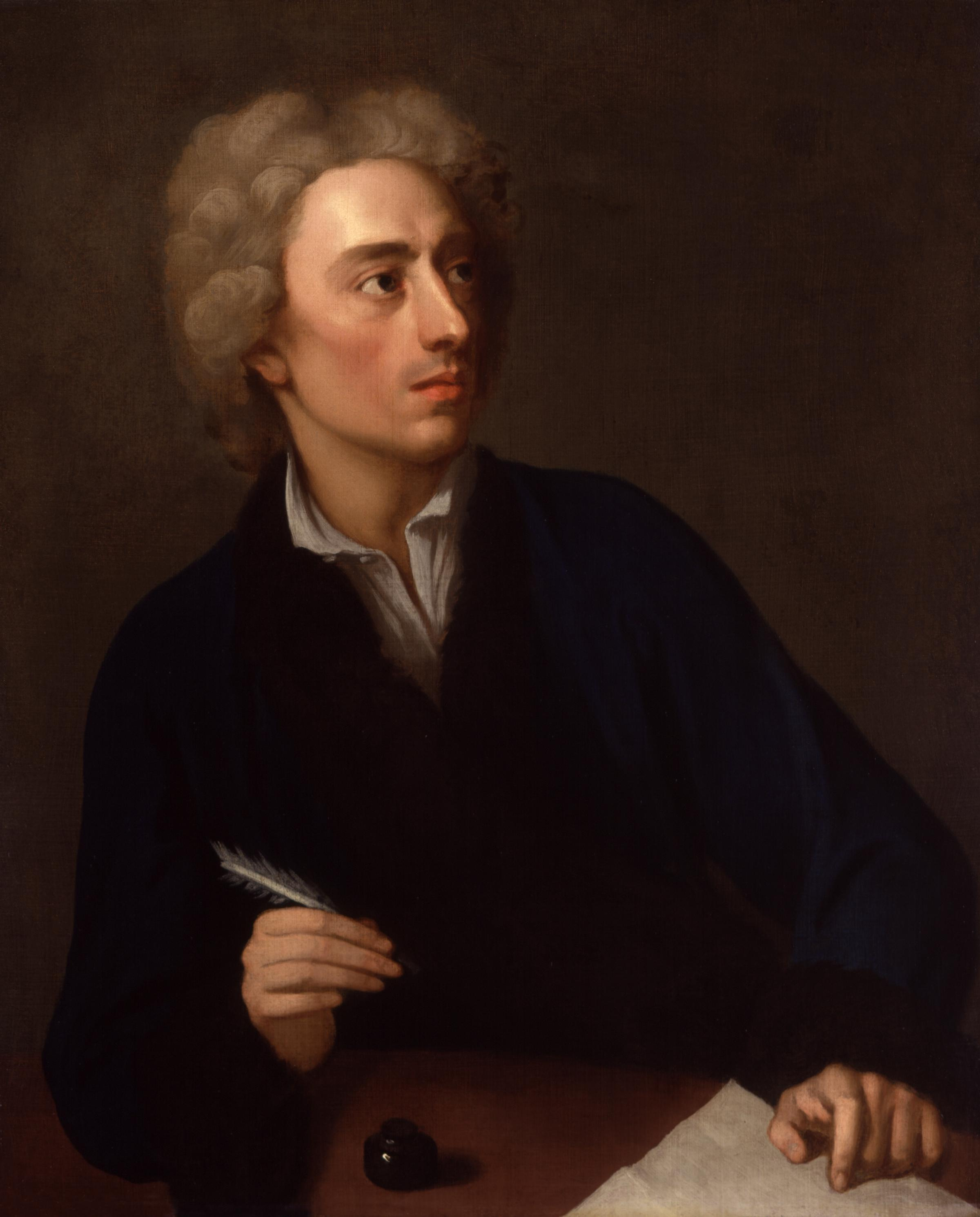
Alexander Pope, the single poet who most influenced the Augustan Age.

The entire Augustan age's poetry was dominated by Alexander Pope. His lines were repeated often enough to lend quite a few clichés and proverbs to modern English usage. Pope had few poetic rivals, but he had many personal enemies and political, philosophical, or religious opponents, and Pope himself was quarrelsome in print. Pope and his enemies (often called "the Dunces" because of Pope's successful satirizing of them in The Dunciad) fought over central matters of the proper subject matter for poetry and the proper pose of the poetic voice.

There was a great struggle over the nature and role of the pastoral in the early part of the century. After Pope published his Pastorals of the four seasons in 1709, an evaluation in the Guardian praised Ambrose Philips's pastorals above Pope's, and Pope replied with a mock praise of Philips's Pastorals that heaped scorn on them. Pope quoted Philips's worst lines, mocked his execution, and delighted in pointing out his empty lines. Pope later explained that any depictions of shepherds and their mistresses in the pastoral must not be updated shepherds, that they must be icons of the Golden Age: "we are not to describe our shepherds as shepherds at this day really are, but as they may be conceived then to have been, when the best of men followed the employment" (Gordon). Philips's Pastorals were not particularly awful poems, but they did reflect his desire to "update" the pastoral. In 1724, Philips would update poetry again by writing a series of odes dedicated to "all ages and characters, from Walpole, the steerer of the realm, to Miss Pulteney in the nursery." Henry Carey was one of the best at satirizing these poems, and his Namby Pamby became a hugely successful obliteration of Philips and Philips's endeavor. What is notable about Philips against Pope, however, is the fact that both poets were adapting the pastoral and the ode, both altering it. Pope's insistence upon a Golden Age pastoral no less than Philips's desire to update it meant making a political statement. While it is easy to see in Ambrose Philips an effort at modernist triumph, it is no less the case that Pope's artificially restricted pastoral was a statement of what the ideal should be.

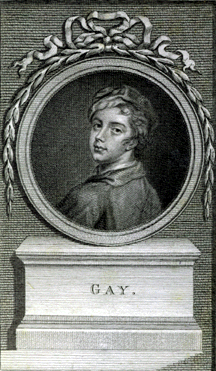
Portrait of John Gay from Samuel Johnson's Lives of the English Poets, the 1779 edition. Gay's gentle satire was a contrast with the harsher Pope and Swift.

Pope's friend John Gay also adapted the pastoral. Gay, working at Pope's suggestion, wrote a parody of the updated pastoral in The Shepherd's Week. He also imitated the Satires of Juvenal with his Trivia. In 1728, his The Beggar's Opera was an enormous success, running for an unheard-of eighty performances. All of these works have in common a gesture of compassion. In Trivia, Gay writes as if commiserating with those who live in London and are menaced by falling masonry and bedpan slops, and The Shepherd's Week features great detail of the follies of everyday life and eccentric character. Even The Beggar's Opera, which is a satire of Robert Walpole, portrays its characters with compassion: the villains have pathetic songs in their own right and are acting out of exigency rather than boundless evil.

Throughout the Augustan era the "updating" of Classical poets was a commonplace. These were not translations, but rather they were imitations of Classical models, and the imitation allowed poets to veil their responsibility for the comments they made. Alexander Pope would manage to refer to the King himself in unflattering tones by "imitating" Horace in his Epistle to Augustus. Similarly, Samuel Johnson wrote a poem that falls into the Augustan period in his "imitation of Juvenal" entitled London. The imitation was inherently conservative, since it argued that all that was good was to be found in the old classical education, but these imitations were used for progressive purposes, as the poets who used them were often doing so to complain of the political situation.

In satire, Pope achieved two of the greatest poetic satires of all time in the Augustan period. The Rape of the Lock (1712 and 1714) was a gentle mock-heroic. Pope applies Virgil's heroic and epic structure to the story of a young woman (Arabella Fermor) having a lock of hair snipped by an amorous baron (Lord Petre). The structure of the comparison forces Pope to invent mythological forces to overlook the struggle, and so he creates an epic battle, complete with a mythology of sylphs and metempsychosis, over a game of Ombre, leading to a fiendish appropriation of the lock of hair. Finally, a deux ex machina appears and the lock of hair experiences an apotheosis. To some degree, Pope was adapting Jonathan Swift's habit, in A Tale of a Tub, of pretending that metaphors were literal truths, and he was inventing a mythos to go with the everyday. The poem was an enormous public success.

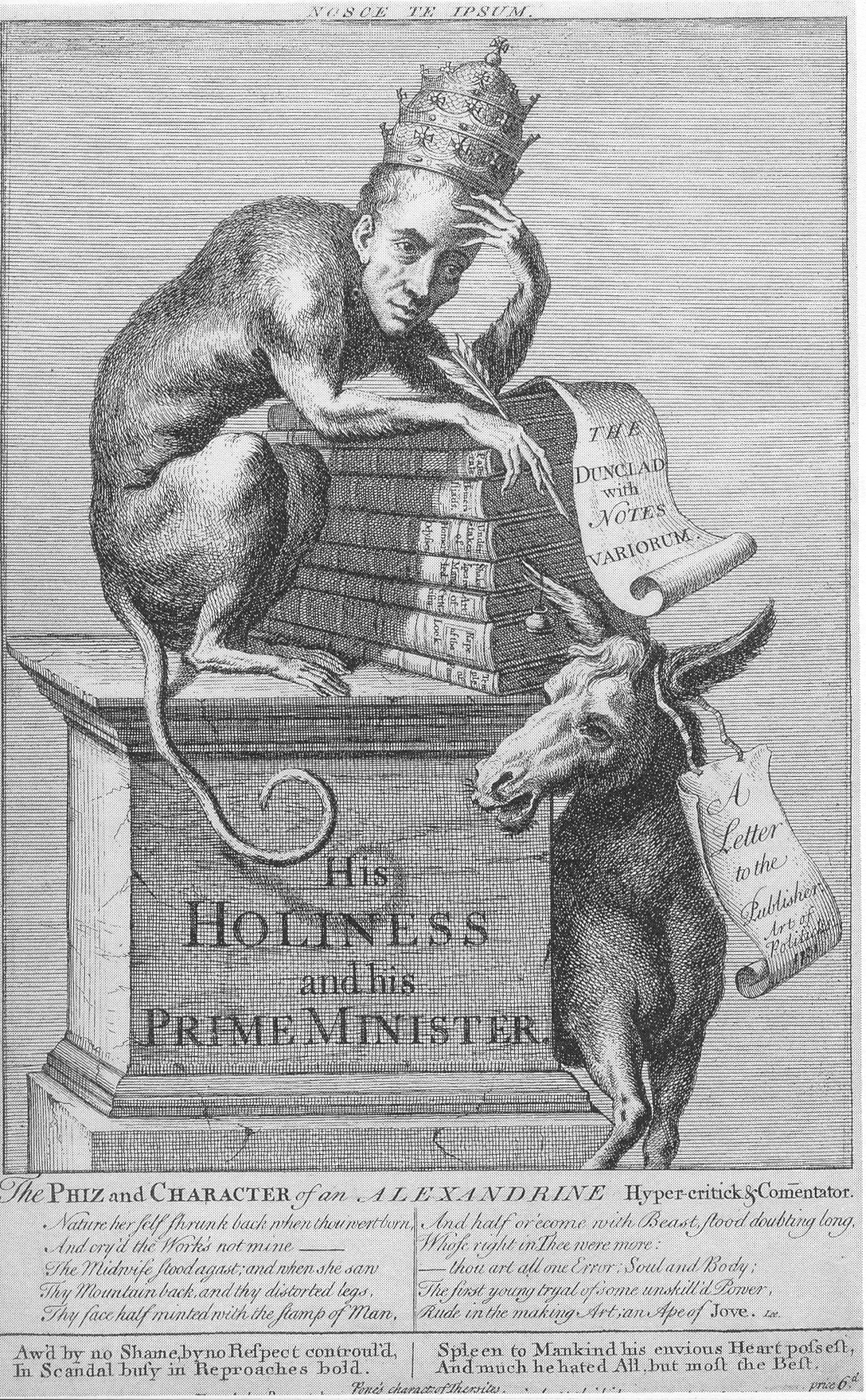
One of the scabrous satirical prints directed against Pope after his Dunciad of 1727

A decade after the gentle, laughing satire of The Rape of the Lock, Pope wrote his masterpiece of invective and specific opprobrium in The Dunciad. The story is that of the goddess Dulness choosing a new Avatar. She settles upon one of Pope's personal enemies, Lewis Theobald, and the poem describes the coronation and heroic games undertaken by all of the dunces of Great Britain in celebration of Theobald's ascension. When Pope's enemies responded to The Dunciad with attacks, Pope produced the Dunciad Variorum, with a "learned" commentary upon the original Dunciad. In 1743, he added a fourth book and changed the hero from Lewis Theobald to Colley Cibber. In the fourth book of the new Dunciad, Pope expressed the view that, in the battle between light and dark (enlightenment and the Dark Ages), Night and Dulness were fated to win, that all things of value were soon going to be subsumed under the curtain of unknowing.

John Gay and Alexander Pope belong on one side of a line separating the celebrants of the individual and the celebrants of the social. Pope wrote The Rape of the Lock, he said, to settle a disagreement between two great families, to laugh them into peace. Even The Dunciad, which seems to be a serial killing of everyone on Pope's enemies list, sets up these figures as expressions of dangerous and antisocial forces in letters. Theobald and Cibber are marked by vanity and pride, by having no care for morality. The hireling pens Pope attacks mercilessly in the heroic games section of the Dunciad are all embodiments of avarice and lies. Similarly, Gay writes of political society, of social dangers, and of follies that must be addressed to protect the greater whole. Gay's individuals are microcosms of the society at large. On the other side of this line were people who agreed with the politics of Gay and Pope (and Swift), but not in approach. They include, early in the Augustan Age, James Thomson and Edward Young.

=== Precursors of Romanticism ===
In the year 1726 two poems were published describing landscape from a personal point of view and taking their feeling and moral lessons from direct observation. One was John Dyer's "Grongar Hill", the other was James Thomson's "Winter", soon to be followed by all the seasons (1726–30). Both are unlike Pope's notion of the Golden Age pastoral as exemplified in his "Windsor Forest". Mythology is at a minimum and there is no celebration of Britain or the crown. Where the octosyllabic couplets of Dyer's poem celebrate the natural beauty of a mountain view and are quietly meditative, the declamatory blank verse of Thomson's winter meditation is melancholy and soon to establish that emotion as proper for poetic expression. One notable successor in that line was Edward Young's Night-Thoughts (1742-1745). It was, even more than "Winter", a poem of deep solitude, melancholy and despair. In these poems, there are the stirrings of the lyric as the Romantics would see it: the celebration of the private individual's idiosyncratic, yet paradigmatic, responses to the visions of the world.

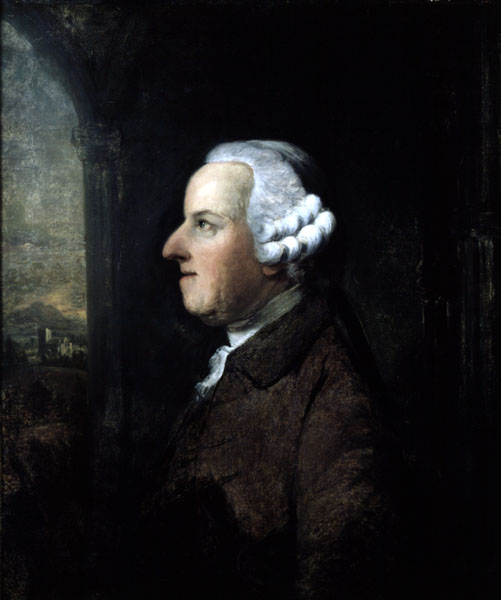
A portrait of Thomas Gray with the churchyard in the background

These hints at the solitary poet were carried into a new realm with Thomas Gray, whose Elegy Written in a Country Church-Yard (1750) set off a new craze for poetry of melancholy reflection. It was written in the "country", and not in or as opposed to London, and the poem sets up the solitary observer in a privileged position. It is only by being solitary that the poet can speak of a truth that is wholly individually realized. After Gray, a group often referred to as the Churchyard Poets began imitating his pose and almost as often his style. Alternative models were adopted by Oliver Goldsmith (The Deserted Village), Thomas Warton, and even Thomas Percy (The Hermit of Warkworth), who, also conservative by and large and Classicist (Gray himself was a professor of Greek), took up the new poetry of solitude and loss.

When the Romantics emerged at the end of the 18th century, they were not assuming a radically new invention of the subjective self themselves, but merely formalizing what had gone before. Similarly, the later 18th century saw a ballad revival, with Thomas Percy's Reliques of Ancient English Poetry. The relics were not always very ancient, as many of the ballads dated from only the 17th century (e.g. the Bagford Ballads or The Dragon of Wantley in the Percy Folio), and so what began as an antiquarian movement soon became a folk movement. When this folk-inspired impulse combined with the solitary and individualistic impulse of the Churchyard Poets, Romanticism was nearly inevitable.

== Drama ==
The Augustan era is difficult to define chronologically in prose and poetry, but it is very easy to date its end in drama. The Augustan era's drama ended definitively with the Licensing Act 1737. Prior to 1737, however, the English stage was changing rapidly from the Restoration comedy and Restoration drama, and their noble subjects, to the quickly developing melodrama.

George Lillo and Richard Steele wrote the trend-setting plays of the early Augustan period. Lillo's plays consciously turned from heroes and kings and toward shopkeepers and apprentices. They emphasized drama on a household scale, rather than a national scale, and the hamartia and agon in his tragedies are the common flaws of yielding to temptation and the commission of Christian sin. The plots are resolved with Christian forgiveness and repentance. Steele's The Conscious Lovers (1722) hinges upon his young hero avoiding fighting a duel. The plays set up a new set of values for the stage. Instead of amusing the audience or inspiring the audience, they sought to instruct the audience and to ennoble it. Also, the plays were popular precisely because they seemed to reflect the audience's own lives and concerns.

Joseph Addison also wrote a play, entitled Cato, a Tragedy, in 1713, which concerned the Roman statesman Cato the Younger. The year of its première was important, with Queen Anne in serious illness at the time, and both the Tory ministry of the day and the Whig opposition (already being led by Robert Walpole) were concerned about the succession. Both groups were contacting the Old Pretender about bringing the Young Pretender over. Londoners sensed the anxiety, as Anne had no heirs, and all of the natural successors in the Stuart family were Roman Catholic or unavailable. Therefore, the figure of Cato was a transparent symbol of Roman integrity, and the Whigs saw in him a champion of Whig values, and the Tories saw in him an embodiment of Tory sentiments or, like the Tory Examiner, tried to claim that Cato was above political "faction". Both sides cheered the play, but Addison was himself clearly a Whig. John Home's play Douglas (1756) would have a similar fate to Cato in the next generation, after the Licensing Act 1737.

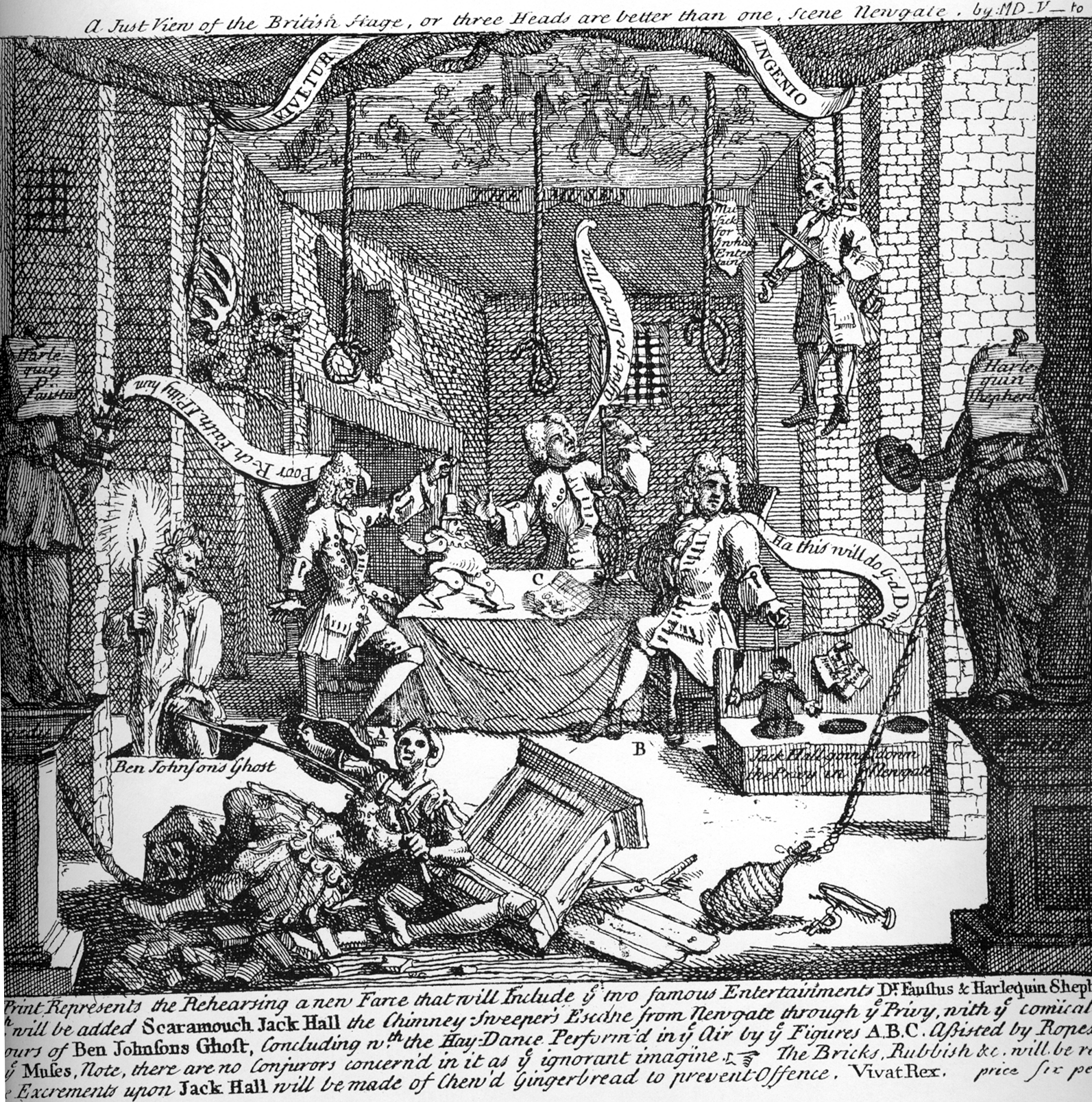
A print by William Hogarth entitled A Just View of the British Stage from 1724 depicting the managers of Drury Lane (Robert Wilks, Colley Cibber and Barton Booth) rehearsing a play consisting of nothing but special effects, and they used the scripts for Macbeth, Hamlet, Julius Caesar and The Way of the World for toilet paper. The battle of effects was a common subject of satire for the literary wits, including Pope in The Dunciad.

As during the Restoration, economics drove the stage in the Augustan period. Under Charles II court patronage meant economic success and so the Restoration stage featured plays that would suit the monarch and/or court. The drama that celebrated kings and told the history of Britain's monarchs was fit fare for the Crown and courtiers. Charles II was a philanderer and so Restoration comedy featured a highly sexualized set of plays. However, after the reign of William and Mary, the court and the Crown stopped taking a great interest in the playhouse. Theatres had to get their money from the audience of city dwellers, and plays that reflected city anxieties and celebrated the lives of citizens drew and were staged.

Thus, there were quite a few plays that were not literary that were staged more often than the literary plays. John Rich and Colley Cibber duelled over special theatrical effects. They put on plays that were actually just spectacles, and the text of the play was almost an afterthought. Dragons, whirlwinds, thunder, ocean waves and even actual elephants were on stage. Battles, explosions and horses were put on the boards. Rich specialized in pantomime and was famous as the character "Lun" in harlequin presentations. The plays put on in this manner are not generally preserved or studied, but their monopoly on the theatres infuriated established literary authors.

Additionally, opera made its way to England during this period. Inasmuch as opera combined singing with acting, it was a mixed genre, which violated all the strictures of neoclassicism. Also, high melodies would cover the singers' expressions of grief or joy, thus breaking "decorum". To add insult to injury, the casts and celebrated stars were foreigners, and, as with Farinelli, castrati. The satirists saw in opera the non plus ultra of invidiousness. As Pope put it in Dunciad B:

Joy to Chaos! let Division reign:
Chromatic tortures soon shall drive them [the muses] hence,
Break all their nerves, and fritter all their sense:
One Trill shall harmonize joy, grief, and rage,
Wake the dull Church, and lull the ranting Stage;
To the same notes thy sons shall hum, or snore,
And all thy yawning daughters cry, encore.

— IV 55–60

Frontispiece to Fielding's Tom Thumb, a play satirising plays (and Robert Walpole).

John Gay parodied the opera with his satirical Beggar's Opera (1728) and offered up a parody of Robert Walpole's actions during the South Sea Bubble. Superficially, the play is about a man named Macheath who keeps being imprisoned by a thief named Peachum and who escapes prison over and over again because the daughter of the jailor, Lucy Lockitt, is in love with him. That is an obvious parallel with the case of Jonathan Wild (Peachum) and Jack Sheppard (Macheath). However, it was also the tale of Robert Walpole (Peachum) and the South Sea directors (Macheath). The play was a hit, and its songs were printed up and sold. However, when Gay wrote a sequel called Polly, Walpole had the play suppressed before performance.

Playwrights were therefore in straits. On the one hand, the playhouses were doing without plays by turning out hack-written pantomimes. On the other hand, when a satirical play appeared, the Whig ministry would suppress it. The antagonism was picked up by Henry Fielding, who was not afraid to fight Walpole. His Tom Thumb (1730) was a satire on all of the tragedies written before him, with quotations from all the worst plays patched together for absurdity, and the plot concerned the eponymous tiny man attempting to run things. It was, in other words, an attack on Robert Walpole and the way that he was referred to as "the Great Man". Here, the Great Man is made obviously deficient by being a midget. Walpole responded, and Fielding's revision of the play was in print only. It was written by "Scribblerus Secundus". Its title page announced it was the Tragedy of Tragedies, which functioned as a clearly Swiftian parodic satire. Anti-Walpolean sentiment also showed in increasingly political plays. A particular play of unknown authorship entitled A Vision of the Golden Rump was cited when Parliament passed the Licensing Act 1737.

The Licensing Act 1737 required all plays to go to a censor before staging, and only the plays passed by the censor were allowed to be performed. The first play to be banned by the new act was Gustavus Vasa by Henry Brooke. Samuel Johnson wrote a Swiftian parodic satire of the licensers entitled A Complete Vindication of the Licensers of the English Stage. The satire was, of course, not a vindication at all, but rather a reductio ad absurdum of the position for censorship. Had the licensers not exercised their authority in a partisan manner, the act might not have chilled the stage so dramatically, but the public was well aware of the bannings and censorship and so any play that passed the licensers was regarded with suspicion by the public. Therefore, the playhouses had little choice but to present old plays and pantomime and other plays that had no conceivable political content. In other words, William Shakespeare's reputation grew enormously, as his plays saw a quadrupling of performances, and sentimental comedy and melodrama were the only choices.

Very late in the 18th century Oliver Goldsmith attempted to resist the tide of sentimental comedy with She Stoops to Conquer (1773), and Richard Brinsley Sheridan would mount several satirical plays after Robert Walpole's death.

== See also ==
- Augustan drama
- Augustan poetry
- Augustan prose
- Jonathan Wild
- The Mint
- Novel
- Restoration literature
  - Restoration drama
  - Restoration spectacular
- Romantic poetry

== Citations ==
| Preceded by Restoration literature | Augustan literature 1700–1789 | Succeeded by Romanticism |
