= Gustavus Vasa =

Gustavus Vasa may refer to:

- King Gustav I of Sweden
- The play Gustavus Vasa by Henry Brooke, first English play to be banned under the Licensing Act 1737
- Alternate name of Olaudah Equiano, African ex-slave living in 18th century Britain
- Gustavus Vasa Fox, American naval officer
