= Yeast (novel) =

1848 novel by Charles Kingsley

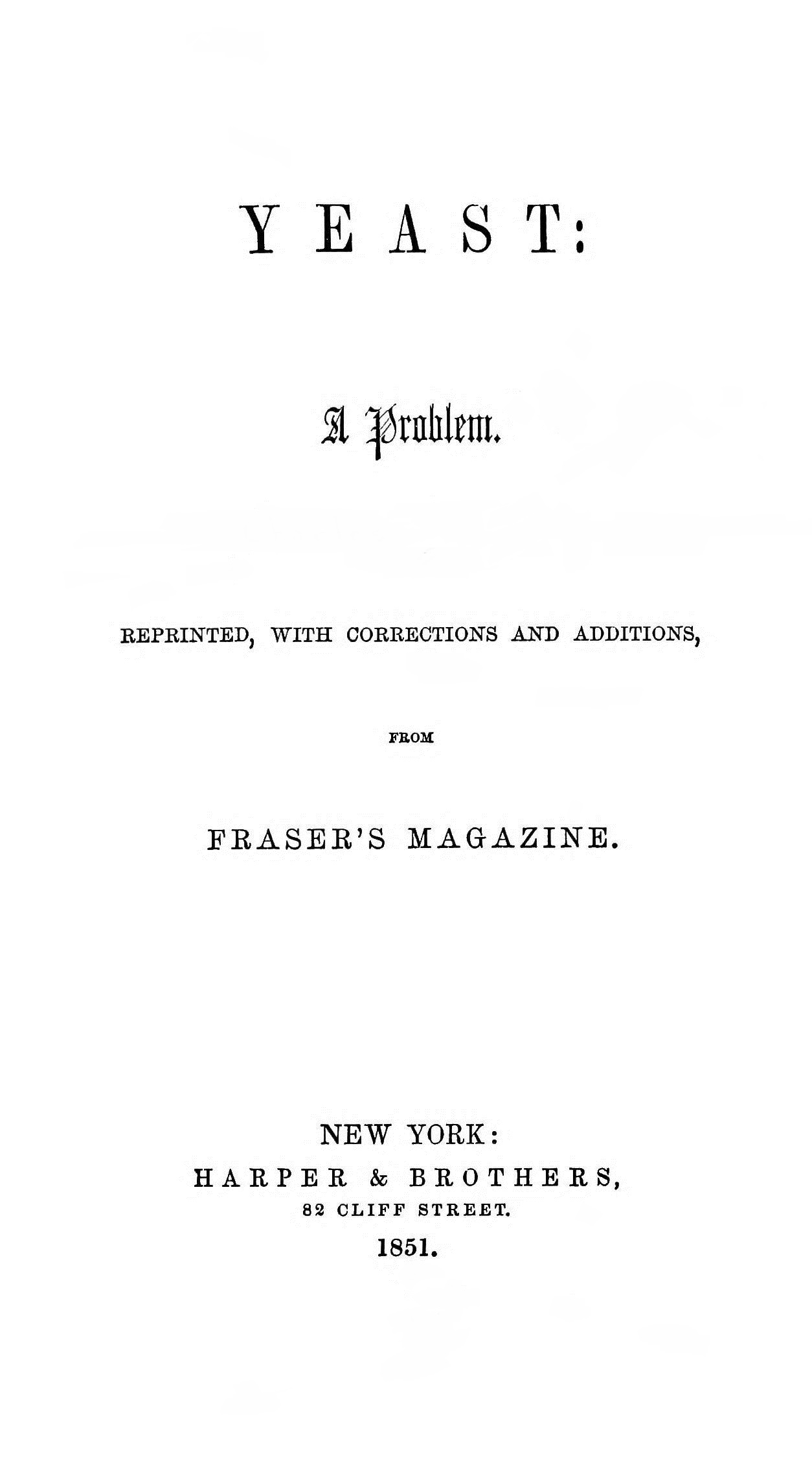
Title page of the 1851 book edition published by Harper and Brothers, New York

Yeast: A Problem was the first novel by the Victorian social and religious controversialist Charles Kingsley published in 1848.

== Themes and sources ==
Motivated by his strong convictions as a Christian Socialist Kingsley wrote Yeast as an attack on Roman Catholicism and the Oxford Movement, on celibacy, the game laws, bad landlords and bad sanitation, and on the whole social system insofar as it kept England’s agricultural labourer class in poverty. The title was intended to suggest the "ferment of new ideas".Yeast was influenced by the works of the philosopher Thomas Carlyle, and by Henry Brooke's novel The Fool of Quality.

== Publication ==
Yeast was first published in instalments in Fraser's Magazine, starting in July 1848, but as the radicalism of Kingsley's ideas became apparent the magazine's publisher took fright and induced the author to bring his novel to a premature close. In 1851 it appeared in volume form.

== Criticism ==
It is sometimes said that Yeast suffers from its over-reliance on long conversations between its hero, Lancelot Smith, and the subsidiary characters of the novel, and from Kingsley's failure to integrate these discussions into anything resembling a coherent plot. On the other hand many have admired the vividness of Kingsley's depiction of the degradation and grinding poverty of the lower classes in the English shires.
