= Augustan drama =

Early 18th-century English theatre

A theatrical riot at Covent Garden's Royal Theatre in 1762 over a rumored increase in ticket prices. Although drama declined in the Augustan era, it was still popular entertainment.

Augustan drama can refer to the dramas of Ancient Rome during the reign of Caesar Augustus, but it most commonly refers to the plays of Great Britain in the early 18th century, a subset of 18th-century Augustan literature. King George I referred to himself as "Augustus," and the poets of the era took this reference as apropos, as the literature of Rome during Augustus moved from historical and didactic poetry to the poetry of highly finished and sophisticated epics and satire.

In poetry, the early 18th century was an age of satire and public verse, and in prose, it was an age of the developing novel. In drama, by contrast, it was an age in transition between the highly witty and sexually playful Restoration comedy, the pathetic she-tragedy of the turn of the 18th century, and any later plots of middle-class anxiety. The Augustan stage retreated from the Restoration's focus on cuckoldry, marriage for fortune, and a life of leisure. Instead, Augustan drama reflected questions the mercantile class had about itself and what it meant to be gentry: what it meant to be a good merchant, how to achieve wealth with morality, and the proper role of those who serve.

Augustan drama has a reputation as an era of decline. One reason for this is that there were few dominant figures of the Augustan stage. Instead of a single genius, a number of playwrights worked steadily to find subject matter that would appeal to a new audience. In addition to this, playhouses began to dispense with playwrights altogether or to hire playwrights to match assigned subjects, and this made the producer the master of the script. When the public did tire of anonymously authored, low-content plays and a new generation of wits made the stage political and aggressive again, the Whig ministry stepped in and began official censorship that put an end to daring and innovative content. This conspired with the public's taste for special effects to reduce theatrical output and promote the novel.

== The middle-class tragedy ==
As for prose and poetry, there is no clear beginning to the "Augustan era" in drama, but the end is clearly marked. Augustan-era drama ended definitively with the Licensing Act 1737. Prior to 1737, the English stage was changing rapidly from Restoration comedy and Restoration drama and their noble subjects to the quickly developing melodrama.

George Lillo and Richard Steele wrote the trend-setting plays of the early Augustan period. Lillo's plays consciously turned from heroes and kings toward shopkeepers and apprentices. They emphasized drama on a household scale rather than a national scale, and the hamartia and agon in his tragedies are the common flaws of yielding to temptation and the commission of Christian sin. The plots are resolved with Christian forgiveness and repentance. Steele's The Conscious Lovers (1722) hinges upon his young hero avoiding fighting a duel. These plays set up a new set of values for the stage. Instead of amusing or inspiring the audience, they sought to instruct the audience and ennoble it. Further, the plays were popular precisely because they seemed to reflect the audience's own lives and concerns.

Joseph Addison also wrote a play entitled Cato in 1713, but it did not inspire followers. Cato concerned the Roman statesman who opposed Julius Caesar. The year of its première is important for understanding why the play is unique, for Queen Anne was seriously ill at the time, and both the Tory ministry of the day and the Whig opposition (already led by Robert Walpole) were concerned about the succession. Both groups were in contact with Anne's exiled brother James Francis Edward Stuart. Londoners sensed this anxiety, for Anne had no surviving children; all of the closest successors in the Stuart family were Roman Catholic. Therefore, the figure of Cato was a transparent symbol of Roman integrity. The Whigs saw in him a Whig refusal to accept an absolute monarch from the House of Stuart, while the Tories saw in him a resistance to rule by a triumphant general (John Churchill, the Duke of Marlborough, whose wife Sarah was rumored to control Anne). Further, Cato's claim that Caesar profited by illegal war echoed the Tory accusations against Marlborough. Both sides cheered the play, even though Addison was himself clearly Whig and had meant the play as something near propaganda. John Home's play Douglas (1756) would have a similar fate to Cato in the next generation after the Licensing Act 1737.

== The problem of "Spectacle" ==
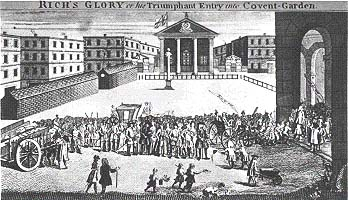
"Rich's Glory": John Rich takes control of Covent Garden Theatre in 1732. The first play he would stage was The Way of the World.

As during the Restoration, economic reality drove the stage during the Augustan period. Under Charles II court patronage meant economic success, and therefore the Restoration stage featured plays that would suit the monarch and/or court. The drama that celebrated kings and told the history of Britain's monarchs was fit fare for the crown and courtiers. Charles II was a philanderer, and so Restoration comedy featured a highly sexualized set of plays. However, after the reign of William III and Mary II, the court and crown stopped taking a great interest in the playhouse. Theaters had to get their money from the audience of city dwellers, therefore, and consequently plays that reflected city anxieties and celebrated the lives of citizens were the ones to draw crowds. The aristocratic material from the Restoration continued to be mounted, and adaptations of Tudor plays were made and ran, but the new plays that were authored and staged were the domestic- and middle-class dramas. The other dramatic innovation was "spectacle": plays that had little or no text, but which emphasized novel special effects.

=== Pantomime and tableau spectacle ===
The public attended when they saw their lives represented on the stage, but also attended when there was a sight that would impress them. If costumes were lavish, the sets impressive or the actresses alluring, audiences would attend. The Restoration spectacular had seen the development of English opera and oratorio and a war between competing theaters to produce the most expensive and eye-popping plays. However, these blockbuster productions could mean financial ruin as much as security, and neither of the two main playhouses could continue the brinksmanship for long. After these battles between the playhouses, and these were multiple, the theaters calculatingly sought the highest appeal with the lowest cost. If the cost of rehearsal time, in particular, could be shortened, the theater's investment would be reduced. Rehearsal time cost a playhouse its cast, its property masters, and its stages, and a long rehearsal meant fewer plays put on. Additionally, dramatists received the money from each third night of box office, and this could be dangerous to a house that needed every farthing to defray costs. Star dramatists could negotiate for more than one benefit night and might have terms for benefits on revival, while new, unknown, or dependent authors could be managed. The solution for the theatrical producers was to cut the costs of plays and actors while increasing the outright spectacle, and there were quite a few plays that were not literary at all that were staged more often than the literary plays.

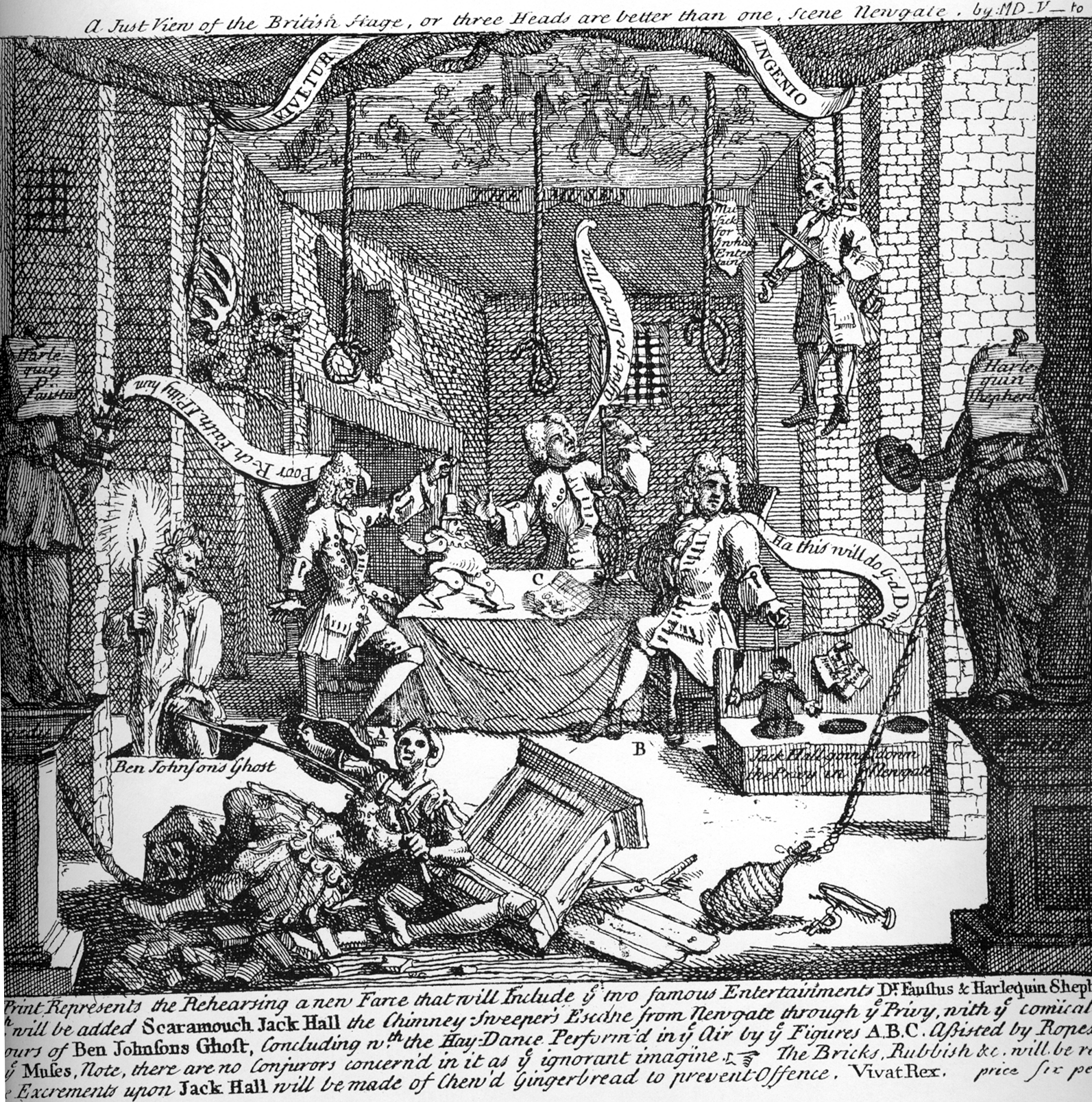
A print by William Hogarth entitled A Just View of the British Stage from 1724 depicting the managers of Drury Lane (Robert Wilks, Colley Cibber, and Barton Booth) rehearsing a play consisting of nothing but special effects, while they used the scripts for The Way of the World, inter al., for toilet paper. This battle of effects was a common subject of satire for the literary wits, including Pope.

John Rich and Colley Cibber dueled over special theatrical effects. They put on plays that were actually just spectacles, where the text of the play was almost an afterthought. Dragons, whirlwinds, thunder, ocean waves, and even actual elephants were on stage. Battles, explosions, and horses were put on the boards (Cibber). Rich specialized in pantomime and was famous as the character "Lun" in harlequin presentations. The playwrights of these works were hired men, not dramatists, and so they did not receive the traditional third-night author's profits. A pantomime, after all, required very little in the way of a playwright and much more in the way of a director, and with John Rich and Colley Cibber both acting as star players and directors, such on-demand spectacles did not necessitate a poet. Further, spectacles could be written quickly to answer to the public's whims or the rival theater's triumphs, rarely risked offensive political statements, and did not require paying benefits to a playwright. In other words, they gave the managers more profit. The plays put on in this manner are not generally preserved or studied, but their near monopoly on the theaters, particularly in the 1720s, infuriated established literary authors. Alexander Pope was only one of the poets to attack "spectacle" (in the 1727 Dunciad A and, with more vigor, the Dunciad B). The criticism was so widespread that Colley Cibber himself made excuses for his part in the special-effects war, claiming that he had no choice but to comply with market pressures.

=== The "chromatic tortures" and divas of opera ===
If vacant, subliterary spectacles were not enough of a threat to dramatists, opera, which had crossed over to England in the Restoration, experienced an enormous surge in popularity with Italian grand opera in England in the 1710s and 1720s. In The Spectator, both in number 18 and the 3 April 1711 number, and many places elsewhere, Joseph Addison fretted that foreign opera would drive English drama from the stage altogether. These early fears followed the sudden rage for the Italian singers and operas that took over London in 1711 with the arrival of Handel. Inasmuch as opera combined singing with acting, it was a mixed genre, and its violation of neoclassical strictures had made it a controversial form from the start. Addison, damning opera's heterogeny, wrote, "Our Countrymen could not forbear laughing when they heard a Lover chanting out a Billet-doux, and even the Superscription of a Letter set to a Tune." This type of opera not only took up theatrical rehearsal time and space, it also took away dramatic subject matter. Straight playwrights were at a loss. As John Gay lamented (see below), no one could use music in a play unless it was as an opera, and Englishmen were nearly forbidden from that. To add insult to injury, the casts and celebrated stars were foreigners and, as with Farinelli and Senesino (the latter of whom was paid two thousand pounds for a single season in 1721), castrati. Castrati were symbols, to the English, of the Roman Catholic Church. The satirists saw in opera the non plus ultra of invidiousness. High melodies would cover the singers' expressions of grief or joy, conflating all emotion and sense under a tune that might be entirely unrelated. Alexander Pope blasted this shattering of "decorum" and "sense" in Dunciad B and suggested that its real purpose was to awaken the Roman Catholic Church's power ("Wake the dull Church") while it put a stop to the political and satirical stage and made all Londoners fall into the sleep of un-Enlightenment:

Joy to Chaos! let Division reign:
Chromatic tortures soon shall drive them [the muses] hence,
Break all their nerves, and fritter all their sense:
One Trill shall harmonize joy, grief, and rage,
Wake the dull Church, and lull the ranting Stage;
To the same notes thy sons shall hum, or snore,
And all thy yawning daughters cry, encore. (IV 55–60)

An 1875 postcard from the Victoria and Albert Hall showing the Duke's Company theatre in Dorset Gardens (the so-called "machine house") in operation from 1671 to 1709, which began as a playhouse and gradually became a house for spectacle.

Furthermore, grand opera had a high degree of spectacle in it. In the 17th century, when opera first came to England, it prompted enormously complex theatrical stagings to present illusions of ghosts, mythological figures, and epic battles. When Handel's arrival in England spurred a new vogue for English opera, it also caused a new vogue for imported opera, no matter the content, so long as it would create an enormous visual impact. Although some of the "Tory Wits" like Pope and John Gay wrote opera librettos (the two combining for Acis and Galatea with Handel), opera was a spectacular form of theater that left too little room for dramatic acting for most of the playwrights. Pope argued in The Dunciad that Handel's operas were "masculine" in comparison to Italian and French opera. While this is a musical commentary, it is also a commentary on the amount of decoration and frippery put on the stage, on the way that Handel's operas concentrated on their stories and music rather than their theatrical effects.

It was not merely the fact that such operas drove out original drama, but also that the antics and vogue for the singers took away all else, seemingly, that infuriated English authors. The singers (particularly the sopranos) introduced London to the concept of the prima donna, in both senses of the term. In 1727, two Italian sopranos, Francesca Cuzzoni and Faustina Bordoni, had such a rivalry and hatred of each other (the latter had been paid more than the former) that the audiences were encouraged to support their favorite singer by hissing her rival, and during a performance of Astyanax in 1727, the two women actually began to fight on stage (Loughrey 13). John Gay wrote to Jonathan Swift on 3 February 1723:

There's nobody allow'd to say I sing but an Eunuch or an Italian Woman. Every body is grown now as great a judge of Musick as they were in your time of Poetry & folks that could not distinguish one tune from another now daily dispute over different Styles of Handel, Bononcini, and Aitillio. People have now forgot Homer, and Virgil & Caesar.

These operas were spectaculars in every sense. The personalities of the stars were before the stage, the stars were before the music, and the music before the words. Additionally, opera brought with it new stage machines and effects. Even Handel, whom Pope values as restrained and sober, had his heroine brought on stage by "two huge Dragons out of whose mouths issue Fire and Smoke" in Rinaldo in 1711.

The "problem" of spectacle continued in the 1720s and 1730s. In 1734, Henry Fielding has his tragedian, Fustian, describe the horror of a pantomime show:

intimating that after the audience had been tired with the dull works of Shakespeare, Jonson, Vanbrugh, and others, they are to be entertained with one of these pantomimes, of which the master of the playhouse, two or three painters, and half a score dancing-masters are the compilers. ...I have often wondered how it was possible for any creature of human understanding, after having been diverted for three hours with the production of a great genius, to sit for three more and see a set of people running about the stage after one another, without speaking one syllable, and playing several juggling tricks, which are done at Fawks's after a much better manner; and for this, sir, the town does not only pay additional prices, but loses several fine parts of its best authors, which are cut out to make room for the said farces.

— Pasquin, V i.

Fustian complains as well that authors are denied stagings because of these entertainments, and, as well, that playhouse managers would steal plays from their authors. As Fustian says earlier, a playwright could spend four months trying to get a manager's attention and then "he tells you it won't do, and returns it to you again, reserving the subject, and perhaps the name, which he brings out in his next pantomime" (Pasquin IV i.).

== The reemergence of satirical drama, and the Licensing Act ==
Toward the end of the 1720s, the behavior of opera stars, the absurdity of spectacle productions, and an escalation of political warfare between the two parties led to a reclamation of the stage by political dramatists. During the later years of King George I, who favored Robert Walpole, there was a scramble for the favor of the future King George II, his wife, and his mistress, and this combined with a shattering of public confidence in the government after the South Sea Bubble and revelations of corruption in the trial of Jonathan Wild, Charles Hitchen, the Earl of Macclesfield, and others.

=== John Gay and comic inversion ===
John Gay parodied the opera with his satirical Beggar's Opera (1728) and with it delivered a satire of Robert Walpole's actions during the South Sea Bubble. Superficially, the play is about a man named Macheath who runs a gang for a criminal fence named Peachum, whose daughter, Polly Peachum, is in love with him, and who escapes prison over and over again because the daughter of the jailor, Lucy Lockitt, is also in love with him. Peachum wishes to see Macheath hanged because Polly has married Macheath, unlike Lucy Lockitt, who is merely pregnant by him (and neither woman is concerned with Macheath's sexual activity, but only with whom he marries, for marriage means access to his estate when he is eventually hanged). Peachum fears that Macheath will turn him in to the law, and he also feels that marriage is a betrayal of good breeding, that prostitution is the genteel thing. Gay announced his intention to create the "ballad opera" with the play. The music for the songs came from tunes already popular, and ten of the tunes were from the satirist Tom D'Urfey, whose Pills to Purge Melancholy was a collection of coarse, bawdy, and amusing songs on various topics. The ballad was associated with folk songs and folk poetry, and so Gay's choice of using ballads (although ballads written by a well-known author) for his music was itself an attempt to deflate the seeming pomposity and elitism of the opera.

For most of the audience, the central entertainment of the opera was the love triangle between Macheath, Polly, and Lucy, but satirically, the centre of the opera was the Peachum/Macheath story. This story was an obvious parallel with the case of Jonathan Wild (Peachum) and Jack Sheppard (Macheath). However, it was also the tale of Robert Walpole (Peachum) and the South Sea directors (Macheath). Robert Walpole was one of the most divisive ministers in British history, and his control of the House of Commons ran for over two decades. Until Margaret Thatcher, no other Prime Minister (the office would not exist in name until later) had as adversarial a relationship with authors, and he had ruthlessly consolidated power and jealously guarded it against all threats. During the South Sea Bubble, Walpole was accused of being "the screen," protecting the moneyed directors of the corporation from prosecution and of cashing in his own shares for full value before the collapse of the stock. Further, during the life and career of the actual Jonathan Wild, Walpole's Whig ministry was suspected of protecting and supporting the master "thief-taker."

Additionally, Gay's opera was a strict parody and inversion of the opera. Gay has his thieves and prostitutes speak like upper-class gentlemen and ladies. Implicitly, he suggests that the nobles are no better than the thieves even as he suggests that thieves have their own mock-monarchies, senates, and religion. He has his Beggar (the putative author of the opera) explain that the two female leads have equal parts and therefore should not fight (a joke that witnesses of the diva battle would understand). The supernaturally lofty settings of opera are, in Gay's hands, the warrens of St Giles parish. For palace settings, he has prisons. For throne rooms, he has taverns. For kings, he has criminal fences. For knights errant/shepherd lovers, he has a highwayman. For goddesses drawn about on gilded chariots, he has a ruined maid, a chorus of prostitutes, and Polly (who is perversely chaste). The arias also use the same metaphors that were common in opera, and Gay's songs are themselves parodies of the predictable lyrics in opera. In each case, high and low trade places and Gay's suggestion of an essential likeness of the ministry with its most famous thief extended also to a suggestion that high opera is essentially like tavern songs and rounds. The play was a hit, running for an unheard-of eighty performances. Subsequently, the songs, as well as the play, were printed up and sold.

Robert Walpole, who had some personal animosity to John Gay, attended the play and enjoyed it. However, upon learning from a friend that he was one of the targets of the satire, he tried to have the play stopped. When Gay wrote a follow-up called Polly, Walpole had the play suppressed before performance. The suppression was without precedent, although it was soon to be used as a precedent, for there had been no actual attack on the ministry. The anti-ministerial (Tory) sentiment was entirely derived from interpretation.

Playwrights were therefore in straits. On the one hand, when the playhouses were not running operas imported wholesale from the continent, they were dispensing with dramatists by turning out hack-written pantomimes. On the other hand, when a satirical play appeared from a literary source, the Whig ministry suppressed it even though it came from the most popular dramatist of the day (i.e., John Gay). Furthermore, the grounds of the suppression were all implicit comparisons, and nothing explicit. Gay had not said that Walpole was a crook as bad as Wild, although he had suggested it.

=== The new Tory wits, escalating satire, and the creation of the Licensing Act 1737 ===
Frontispiece to Fielding's Tom Thumb, a play satirizing plays (and Robert Walpole)

Robert Walpole's personal involvement in censoring entertainments critical of him only fanned the flames of the antagonism between himself and the stage. Henry Fielding, among others, was not afraid to provoke the ministry, and anti-Walpolean plays spiked after the suppression of Polly. Fielding's Tom Thumb (1730) was a satire on all of the tragedies written before him, with quotations from all the worst plays patched together for absurdity, and the plot concerned the eponymous tiny man attempting to run the kingdom and insinuate himself into the royal ranks. It was, in other words, an attack on Robert Walpole and the way that he was referred to as "the Great Man" and his supposed control over Caroline of Ansbach. As with Gay's Beggar's Opera, the miniature general speaks constantly in elevated tones, making himself a great hero, and all of the normal-sized ladies fight each other to be his lover. The contrast between reality, delusion, and self-delusion was a form of bathos that made the audience think of other grand-speaking and grandly spoken of people. If a ridiculously tiny figure could be acclaimed a hero because of his own braggadocio, might other great leaders be similarly small? Were they titans, or dwarves like Tom Thumb? Fielding announced, essentially, that the emperor had no clothes, the prime minister no greatness. Walpole responded by suppressing the performance of the play. Fielding was a justice of the peace by profession, and so he knew that the ministry could only control the stage and not book publication. Therefore, he tapped into the market for printed plays, and his revision of the play was solely in book form. It was written by "Scribblerus Secundus," its title page announced (a reference to the Scriblerus Club of Jonathan Swift, Gay, Pope, Robert Harley, Thomas Parnell, John Arbuthnot, and Henry St. John), and it was the Tragedy of Tragedies, which did for drama what Pope's Peri Bathos: or The Art of Sinking in Poetry had done for verse. Fielding placed a critical apparatus on the play, showing the sources of all the parodies, and thereby made it seem as if his target had all along been bad tragedy and not the prime minister. (Fielding's later novel, Jonathan Wild, makes it clear that such was not the case, for it used exactly the same satirical device, "the Great Man," to lambaste the same target, Robert Walpole.)

Henry Fielding was not done with ministry satire. His Covent-Garden Tragedy of 1732 was set in a brothel amongst the prostitutes. Although the play was only acted once, it, like Tom Thumb, sold when printed. Its attacks on poetic license and the antirealism of domestic tragedians and morally sententious authors was an attack on the values central to the Whig version of personal worth. Two years later, Fielding was joined by Henry Carey in anti-Walpolean satire. His Chrononhotonthologos takes its cue from Tom Thumb by outwardly satirizing the emptiness of bombast. However, it also encoded a very specific and dangerous satire of King George II and his statutory wife. The king and queen never meet in the play, and the subject is the former's wars with personal discomfort and the latter's desire for adultery. In particular, the Queen herself is implicitly attacked. However, the play also appears to be a superficial work of fancy and nonsense verse, and it delighted audiences with tongue twisters and parody. However, Carey worked The Dragon of Wantley into a play in 1734. Fielding and Carey, among others, picked up the cudgels where the Tory Wits had set them down and began to satirize Walpole and Parliament with increasing ferocity (and scatology). Although a particular play of unknown authorship entitled A Vision of the Golden Rump was cited when Parliament passed the Licensing Act 1737 (the "rump" being Parliament, a rump roast, and human buttocks simultaneously), Carey's Dragon of Wantley was an unmistakable attack on tax policy and the ever-increasing power of the London government over the countryside. Notably, Fielding's and Carey's plays made allowances for spectacle. Indeed, their plays relied upon a burlesque of spectacle and by spectacle, for the effects of TopsyTurvy armies in Chrononhotonthologos (stacked atop each other instead of in ranks) and the titular dragon of Wantley, as well as the miniaturizing of Tom Thumb and the lurid scenery of the Covent Garden brothel, were part of the draw and part of the humor for these plays.

The Licensing Act 1737 required all plays to go to a censor before staging, and only those plays passed by the censor were allowed to be performed. Therefore, plays were judged by potential criticism of the ministry and not just by reaction or performance. The first play to be banned by the new Act was Gustavus Vasa by Henry Brooke. The play invoked the Swedish Protestant king Gustav Vasa to castigate the purportedly corrupt Parliament of Walpole's administration, although Brooke would claim that he meant only to write a history play. Samuel Johnson wrote a Swiftian parodic satire of the licensers, entitled A Complete Vindication of the Licensers of the Stage (1739). The satire was, of course, not a vindication at all but rather a reductio ad absurdum of the position for censorship. Had the licensers not exercised their authority in a partisan manner, the act might not have chilled the stage so dramatically, but the public was well aware of the bannings and censorship, and consequently any play that did pass the licensers was regarded with suspicion by the public. Therefore, the playhouses had little choice but to present old plays and pantomime and plays that had no conceivable political content. One consequence was that William Shakespeare's reputation grew enormously as his plays saw a quadrupling of performances, and sentimental comedy and melodrama were the only "safe" choices for new drama. Dramatists themselves had to turn to prose or to less obvious forms of criticism, such as puppet shows that Charlotte Charke would invest in.

== Effects of the Licensing Act 1737 ==
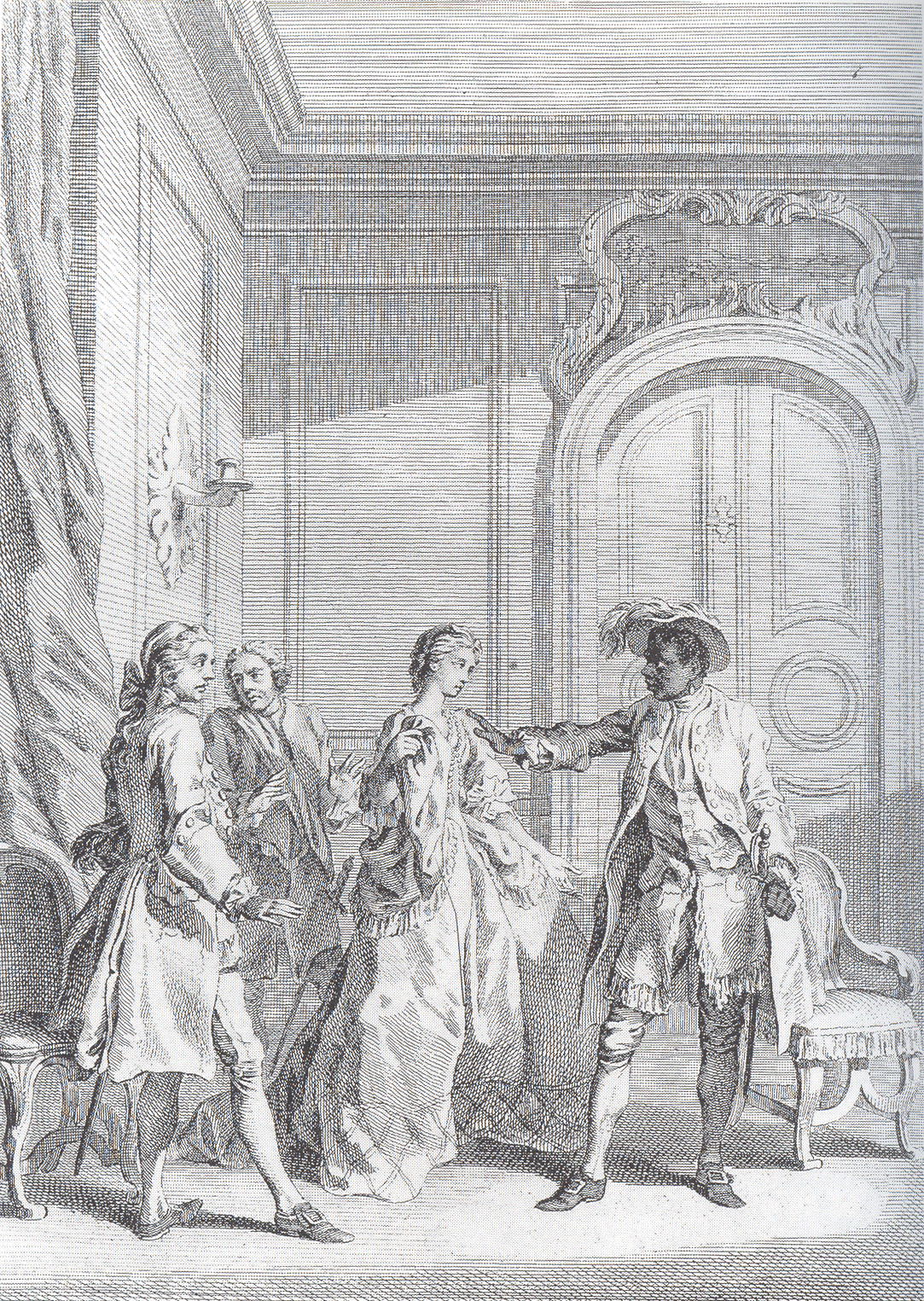
Othello "strikes" Desdemona in Othello from the 1744 Thomas Hanmer deluxe edition of William Shakespeare. Hanmer's was one of the "improved" editions that was roundly hissed by textual critics.

In comedy, one effect of the Licensing Act 1737 was that playwrights began to develop a comedy of sentiment. This comedy was critically labeled as "high" comedy, in that it was intended to be entertaining rather than actually be funny, and brought about its entertainment by elevating the sentiments of the viewer. The plots also relied upon characters being in or out of sympathy with each other. Very late in the 18th century Oliver Goldsmith attempted to resist the tide of sentimental comedy with She Stoops to Conquer (1773), and Richard Brinsley Sheridan would mount several satirical plays after Walpole's death. Both of these playwrights were taking advantage of a loosening of the censorship and popular weariness with "refined" comedy. Goldsmith's play reintroduces the country bumpkin character who outwits the sophisticated would-be rakes who are engaged in a plot to marry well. Sheridan, on the other hand, very consciously turned back to the Restoration comedy for his models but carefully toned down the dangers of the sexual plots.

As mentioned above, another effect of the Licensing Act 1737 was to send the playhouses to old plays. Since any play written before 1737 could be staged without permission, theaters had a great deal to choose from. However, they sought out Shakespeare, in particular, as the one author whose name alone could generate an audience as large as those formerly provided by leading poets. Shakespeare's stature had been rising throughout the 18th century, and textual criticism, particularly of Shakespeare, had resulted in reliable texts (see Shakespeare's reputation for details). Further, many of the expurgated and "improved" versions of Shakespeare were falling from favor. Actors such as David Garrick made their entire reputations by playing Shakespeare. The Licensing Act 1737 may be the single greatest factor in the rise of "Bardolatry." However, other, less sparkling, plays were also revived, including multiple versions of Lady Jane Grey and The Earl of Essex (including one by Henry Brooke that had been written before the act). Each of these could be used as a tacit commentary on the politics of the contemporary court and as a political gesture. Therefore, when playhouses wished to answer the public's political sentiment, they could quickly mount a performance of Cato or one of the Lady Jane Greys or, if the mood was otherwise, one of Aphra Behn's royalist plays, and some of the Restoration plays such as William Wycherly's The Plain Dealer and William Congreve's The Way of the World were always promising comedy. However, when they needed to fill the house reliably, regardless of political season, and show off their actors, they staged Shakespeare.

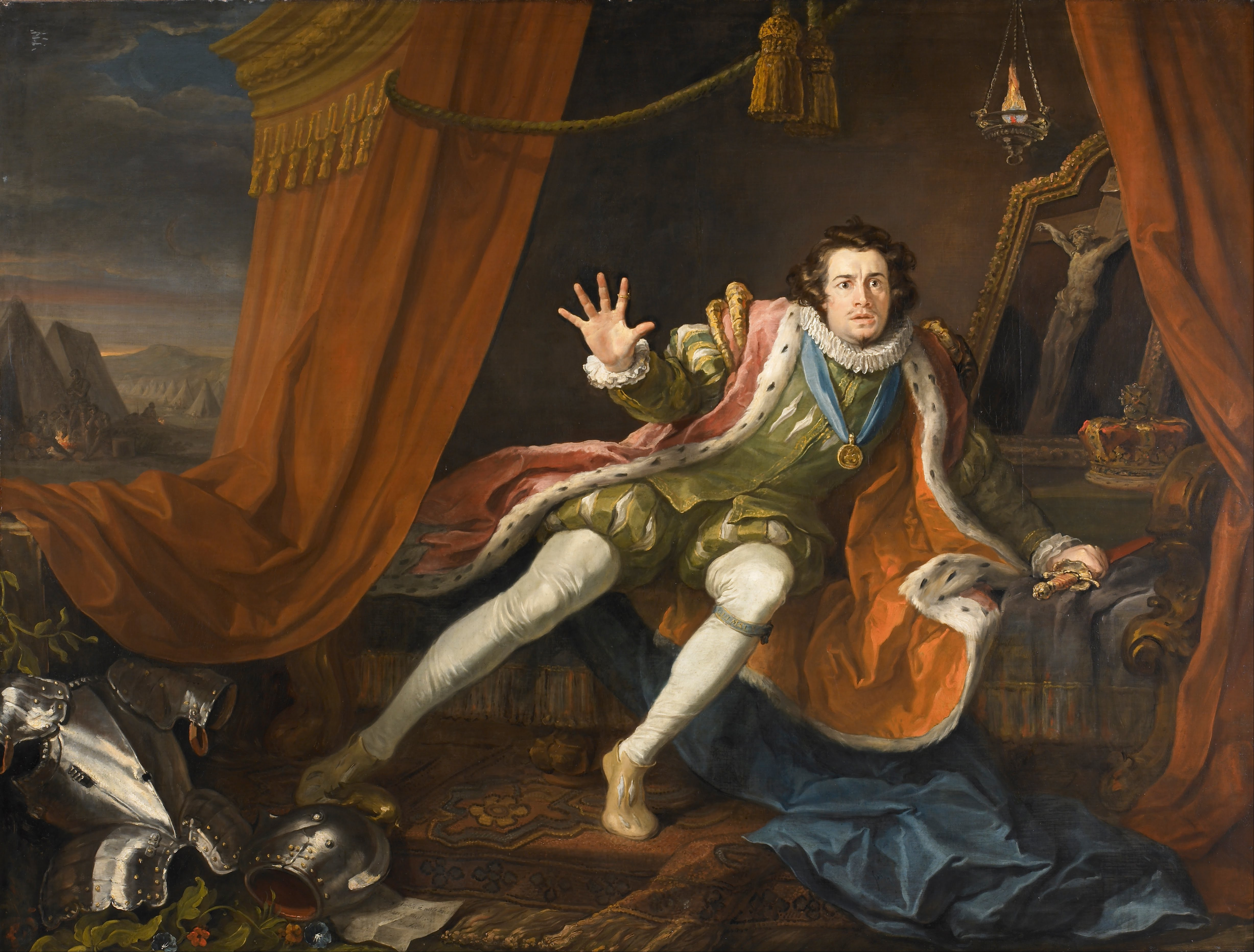
David Garrick, a celebrity actor, starring as King Richard III in Colley Cibber's revision of Shakespeare's play six years after the Licensing Act 1737.

Finally, authors with strong political or philosophical points to make would no longer turn to the stage as their first hope of making a living. Prior to 1737, plays were de rigueur for authors who were not journalists. This had to do with the economics of booksellers. A bookseller would purchase a book from an author, whether that book was Gulliver's Travels or Collected Sermons, and would calculate his chances of making money off of sales. He would pay the author according to the money he expected to make. (For example, Goldsmith's The Vicar of Wakefield was famously sold to pay a single rent installment, whereas John Gay had been paid 1,000 pounds for his Poems on Various Occasions, which was more than seven years of salary for his government job). That would be the only money an author would see from the book, and therefore the author would need to produce a new version, new book, or a serial publication of the next work to have hopes of more income. Prior to 1737, novelists had come from the ranks of satirists (Jonathan Swift) and journalists (Daniel Defoe), but these novels had in common wide changes of scenery, long plots, and often impossible things (such as talking horses)—all features that made the works unsuitable for the stage. The exception was Aphra Behn, who was a dramatist first and a novelist second. Her Oroonoko seems to have been written as a novel simply because there was no time for staging, as it was a political commentary on ongoing events, and she could not have another play on the boards at the time. Her Love-Letters Between a Nobleman and His Sister, like Gulliver's Travels and Moll Flanders, was inappropriate for the stage. However, after 1737, novels began to have dramatic structures involving only normal human beings, as the stage was closed off for serious authors.

Additionally, prior to 1737 the economic motivations for dramatists were vast. A playwright received the house take of the third night of a play. This could be a very large amount of money, and it would be renewed with each season (depending upon arrangements). Thus, John Gay grew wealthy with The Beggar's Opera. In 1726, Leonard Welsted's indifferent success, The Dissembled Woman, was acted at Lincoln's Inn Fields. It netted him £138 for the author's benefit but only £30 for the printing rights. After the Licensing Act 1737 closed off hopes for serious authors on the stage, the novel was the next logical path. In particular, Samuel Richardson's Clarissa was published in serial form and made the author a substantial amount of money from subscriptions. The novel became a potentially lucrative form of publishing, and booksellers began to pay more for novels as novels began to sell more. From being a form of exigency, the novel became a form of choice after the stage was shut down by the Licensing Act 1737. Therefore, the Licensing Act 1737 had the unintended effect of increasing rather than decreasing the power of dissenting authors, as it put a stop to anti-Walpolean sentiments and anti-ministry arguments on the stage (which could only reach audience members in London) and sent these messages instead to the novel form, where they would remain in print, pass from hand to hand, and spread throughout the kingdom.

== See also ==
- Restoration drama
- Augustan literature
  - Augustan poetry
  - Augustan prose

== Bibliography ==
- Addison, Joseph and Richard Steele. The Spectator. Retrieved 19 August 2005.
- Cibber, Colley (first published 1740, ed. Robert Lowe, 1889). An Apology for the Life of Colley Cibber, vol.1, vol 2. London. This is a scholarly 19th-century edition, containing a full account of Cibber's long-running conflict with Alexander Pope at the end of the second volume, and an extensive bibliography of the pamphlet wars with many other contemporaries in which Cibber was involved.
- Davis, Caroline. "Publishing in the Eighteenth Century: Popular Print Genres". Retrieved 22 June 2005.
- D'Urfey, Tom. Wit and Mirth: or Pills to Purge Melancholy. 6 vol. London: Jacob Tonson, 1719–1720.
- Gay, John and Alexander Pope. Acis and Galatea London: 1718. Retrieved 12 July 2005.
- Fielding, Henry. 1734. Pasquin: A Dramatick Satire on the Times Being The Rehearsal of Two Plays Viz. A Comedy Called The Election and a Tragedy Called The Life and Death of Common Sense. New York: Kessinger, 2005.
- Gay, John. The Beggar's Opera. Bryan Loughrey and T. O. Treadwell, eds. London: Penguin Books, 1986.
- Greene, Donald. The Age of Exuberance: Backgrounds to Eighteenth-Century Literature, 1660–1785. New York: McGraw Hill Companies, 1970.
- Munns, Jessica. "Theatrical culture I: politics and theatre" in The Cambridge Companion to English Literature 1650-1740 Ed. Steven Zwicker. Cambridge: Cambridge University Press, 1999.
- Pope, Alexander. The Poetic Works of Alexander Pope. John Butt, ed. New Haven: Yale UP, 1968.
- Shesgreen, Sean, ed. Engravings by Hogarth. New York: Dover Publications, 1975.
- Trussler, Simon, ed. Burlesque Plays of the Eighteenth Century. Clarendon: Oxford UP, 1969.
- Ward, A.W., A.R. Waller, W. P. Trent, J. Erskine, S.P. Sherman, and C. Van Doren. The Cambridge history of English and American literature: An encyclopedia in eighteen volumes. New York: G.P. Putnam's Sons, 1921.
- Watt, Ian. The Rise of the Novel: Studies in Defoe, Richardson and Fielding. Los Angeles: U California Press, 1957.
- Winn, James "Theatrical culture 2: theatre and music" in The Cambridge Companion to English Literature 1650-1740 Ed. Steven Zwicker. Cambridge: Cambridge University Press, 1999.
