= Charlotte Brooke =

Irish writer

- Born: c. 1740; Rantavan, Ireland
- Died: 1793 (aged c. 50); Longford, Ireland
- Occupation: writer
- Notable work: 'Reliques of Irish Poetry' (1789)

Charlotte Brooke (c. 1740 – 1793), born in Rantavan, beside Mullagh in County Cavan, Ireland, was the author of Reliques of Irish Poetry, a pioneering volume of poems collected by her in the Irish language, with facing translations. She was one of twenty-two children fathered by the writer Henry Brooke, author of Gustavus Vasa; only she (and perhaps one other sibling) survived childhood.

== Early life ==
From an early age she was attracted to books. While the rest of her family was sleeping, Brooke would go down to the study where she would spend hours reading.

Charlotte Brooke was educated by her father Henry Brooke, and she immersed herself in reading history and literature at an early age. She was part of the first generation of the Protestant Anglo-Irish settler class who took a strong interest in the Irish language and Gaelic history; her primary interest in Irish language and literature was generated by her hearing it being spoken and recited by the labourers in County Cavan and on the County Kildare estates where her family had moved around 1758. She was led to the study of the Irish language, and in less than two years she found herself in love with it. From reading Irish poetry and admiring its beauties, she proceeded to translate it into English, one of her earliest efforts being a song and monody by Carolan, which appeared in Joseph Cooper Walker's 'Historical Memoirs of Irish Bards.'

== Mid-life ==
Brooke, who was frail herself, took care of her father after her mother died in 1773. Meanwhile, the family had moved back to County Cavan, where they began living in a house they named Longfield which had been built near the Rantavan Estate. A few years after Henry Brooke died in 1783, Charlotte Brooke ran into money troubles, after a model industrial village set up in County Kildare by her cousin Captain Robert Brooke went bankrupt (1787). Walker and other members of the recently created Royal Irish Academy sought to make an income for her, but Charlotte realised she had to rely on her writings and translations.

== Late life ==
In 1792, Brooke had taken up a life with friends in Longford, sharing a cottage due to her lack of income. On 29 March 1793, Charlotte Brooke passed of a malignant fever.

== Writings ==
Brooke wrote:

- Reliques of Irish Poetry (1789);
- Dialogue between a Lady and her Pupils (1791);
- The School for Christians (1791);
- Natural History, etc.;
- Emma, or the Foundling of the Wood, and Belisarius (1803).

She sought to preserve the work of Irish poets, which she believed would be lost if not translated. This example of Brooke's work is taken from a poem in Joseph C. Walker's Historical Memoirs of the Irish Bards where her translation produces eight lines from an original four.

Carolan's Monody on the Death of Mary Mac Guire

Were mine the choice of intellectual fame,
Of spelful song, and eloquence divine,
Painting’s sweet power, philosophy’s pure flame,
And Homer’s lyre, and Ossian’s Harp were mine;
The splendid arts of Erin, Greece, and Rome,
In Mary lost, would lose their wonted grace,
All would I give to snatch her from the tomb,
Again to fold her in my fond embrace.

Original stanza from Duan Mharbhna a Mhna, Maire Ni-Meic-Guidhir (le Toirdhealbhach Ua-Cearbhallain)

INNTLEACHT na Hereann, na Gréige ’sna Rómha,
Biodh uile a néinfheacht, a naen bheirtin rómhamsa,
Ghlacfuinn mur fhéirin, tar an mhéidsin dona seoda,
Máire on Eírne, as mé bheith dha pógadh.
