= The Fruit-Shop =

Satirical writing

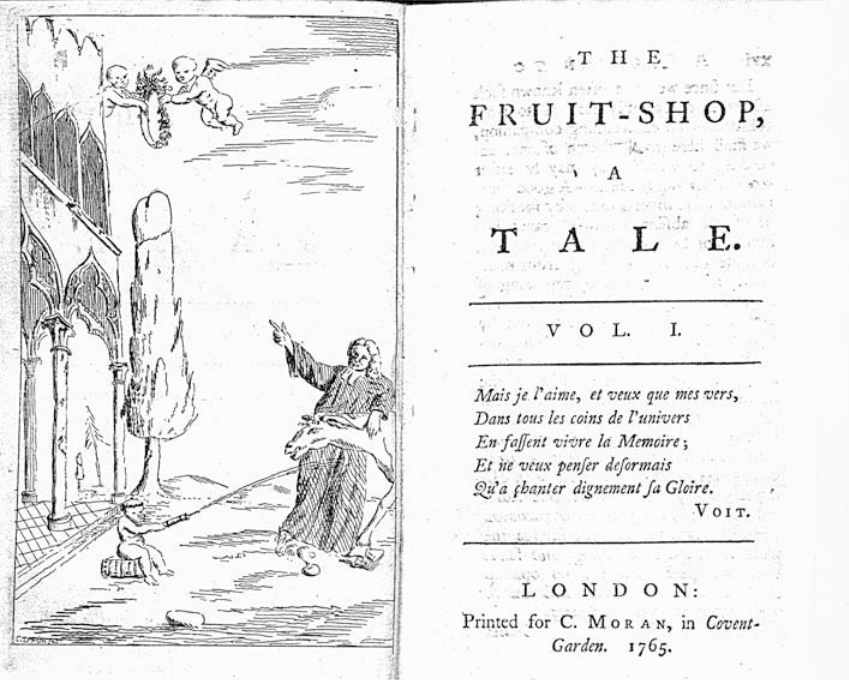
Frontispiece and title page, 1765

The Fruit-Shop, a Tale is an anonymous work of satire with erotic themes printed at London by C. Moran in 1765. A second edition was printed in 1766 for J. Harrison, near Covent Garden. The text is, for the most part, an allegorical and discursive disquisition on the "Fruit-Shop", as the author calls woman, or rather on those parts of her which are more particularly connected with fruit-bearing.

== Frontispiece ==
To the first volume there is a curious, roughly engraved frontispiece, signed C. Trim fec^{t.}, representing a garden scene; before a temple of oriental design stands a yew tree shaped like a phallus, above which two Cupids hold a wreath in form of the female organ; a man, dressed in academic robes, and leaning on an ass, points to the phallic tree, while a boy squirts at him with a syringe. The chief figure in this frontispiece is intended for the "distinguished personage" to whom the volume is dedicated: Laurence Sterne, author of Tristram Shandy (the book on which the ass treads in the frontispiece).

== Contents ==
The work is divided into four parts. The first treats of the Garden of Eden, its probable position on the globe, etc. The second part relates to what happened after the Fall, the invention of the Fig-leaf, etc., and goes on to treat of Love, Marriage, Cuckoldom, and "The Unnaturalists, or Deserters of the Fruit-Shop". Part III consists of a review of the "unwearied passion for the Fruit-Shop" among the Romans, beginning with Jupiter and ending with Julius Caesar. In the fourth part are chapters on "Odd Conceptions", Celibacy, and Flagellation as a "Bye-Way to Heaven". Other matters discoursed upon are Macerations, "Mahomet no Fool", Platonism, Eunuchism, and the "Philo-gonists, the truly Orthodox".

The Appendix and Notes close the second volume. In them is described "The Fruit-Shop of St. James' Street", where "matters never proceed further in this chaste domain than to a kiss or a feel, transiently and with the greatest decorum"; the object, title, etc., of the work are explained; and, finally various quotations, in different languages, upon women's breasts.

== Appraisal ==
According to Henry Spencer Ashbee, "The manner and humour of Swift and Sterne seem to have been aimed at; sarcasms and covert inuendos [sic] on living personages are frequent; and digressions are freely indulged in; but the wit and true satire of these writers are never attained."

== Sources ==
- Ashbee, Henry Spencer [Pisanus Fraxi] (1885). Catena Librorum Tacendorum. London: privately printed. pp. 107–12.
- Harvey, Karen (2004). Reading Sex in the Eighteenth Century: Bodies and Gender in English Erotic Culture. New York: Cambridge University Press. pp. 5, 52, 86, 95, 98, 114, 133, 139, 143, 144, 150, 152, 184–5, 190, 204, 206, 207, 212, 213. ISBN 9780521822350.
- Peakman, Julie (2003). "Sexual Utopias in Erotica". Mighty Lewd Books. London: Palgrave Macmillan. pp. 118–19, 221. doi:10.1057/9780230512573_6. ISBN 9781349512041.
