= The Fool of Quality =

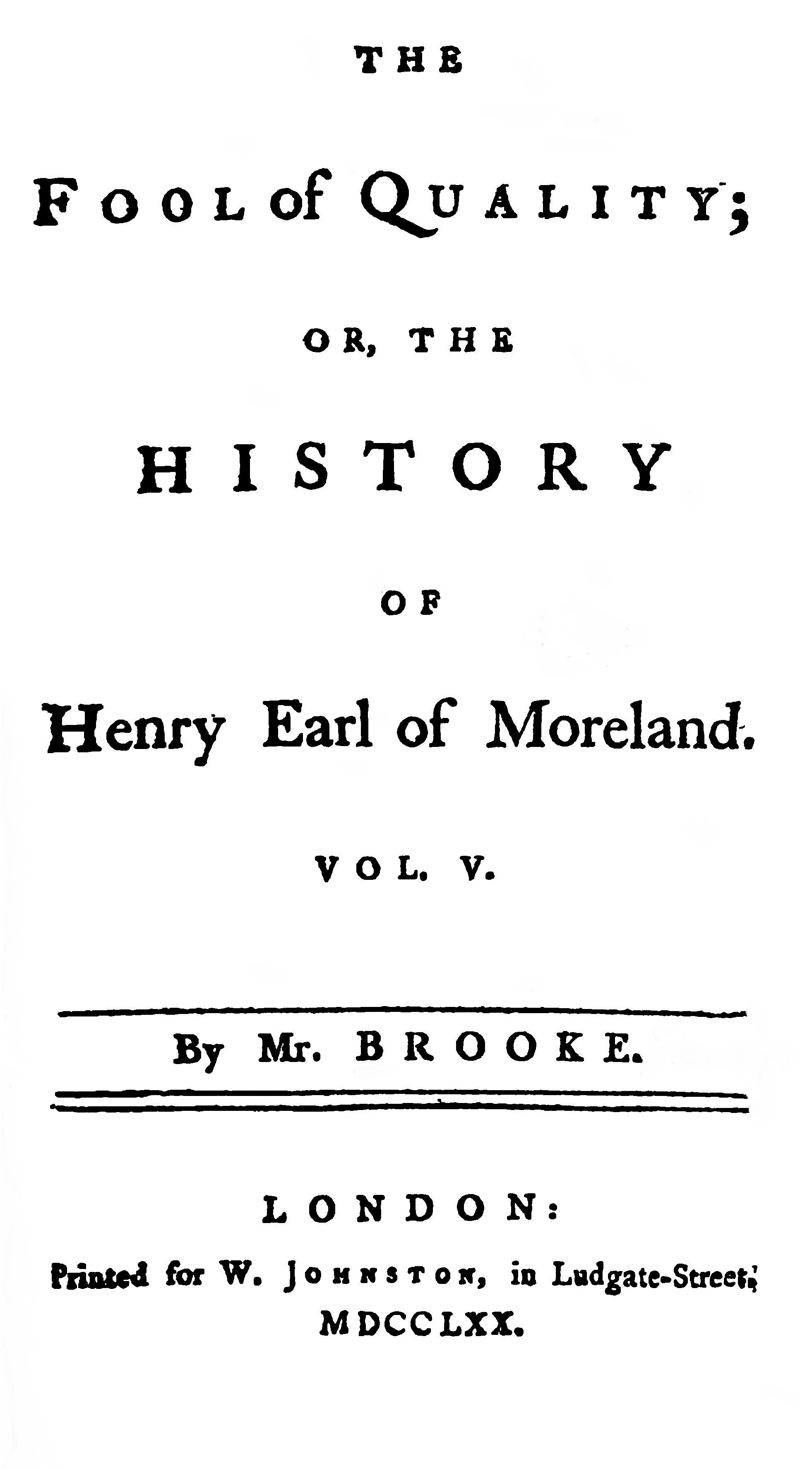
Title page to volume five of the first edition

The Fool of Quality; or, The History of Henry, Earl of Moreland (1765–70), a picaresque and sentimental novel by the Irish writer Henry Brooke, is the only one of his works which has enjoyed any great reputation. The somewhat shapeless plot is an account of the doings of young Harry Clinton, who, rejected by his decadent and aristocratic father, is educated on enlightened principles by his philanthropic uncle. Thus equipped to fight the evils of the world the innocent yet wise hero does his best to better the lot of the unfortunate Hammel Clement and his family, and other deserving cases, in the intervals between the author’s frequent philosophical digressions and commentaries on the action.

== Influences ==
The Fool of Quality, it has been said, was

more deeply stamped with the seal of Rousseau — the Rousseau of the second Discourse and of Émile — than is any other book of the period…Before we can find anything approaching to this keenness of feeling, this revolt against the wrongs of the social system, we have to go forward to the years immediately succeeding the outbreak of the French revolution.

It was also strongly influenced by John Locke's On Education, by the writings of the Christian mystic Jakob Böhme, and by the spirit of the Methodist movement.

== Publication history and reception ==
The Fool of Quality was privately published in 5 volumes in 1765-1770, and a revised edition was published by Edward Johnston in 1776. Reviews were at first unfavourable, but critics quickly came to appreciate the novel's virtues. In 1781 a two-volume version was published under the title The History of Henry, Earl of Moreland, abridged and modified by John Wesley, and with a preface by him in which he wrote that the book

perpetually aims at inspiring and increasing every right affection; at the instilling gratitude to God and benevolence to man. And it does this, not by dry, dull, tedious precepts, but by the liveliest examples that can be conceived; by setting before your eyes one of the most beautiful pictures that ever was drawn in the world.

The writer Thomas Day, author of The History of Sandford and Merton, was profoundly influenced by The Fool of Quality; indeed his biographer claims it was the book that appealed to him above all others. Charles Kingsley, whose novel Yeast owes a considerable debt to The Fool of Quality, prepared his own edition of it in 1859. He considered the book "more pure, sacred and eternal than anything since the Faerie Queene". In modern times The Fool of Quality's rambling and digressive structure, and the sentimental extravagances which it shares with other novels of sensibility, have prevented it from reaching a wide readership. Many would agree with the critic who, in 1806, noted that

an unnatural elevation is given to the most trifling circumstances and sentiments; every emotion is a rapture or an agony, every person seems to be the deity of the moment who attracts all eyes and all hearts; in short, we are in another world.

Walter Allen went so far as to call it "one of the worst novels ever written, but a remarkable book".
