= Henry Brooke (writer) =

Irish novelist and dramatist

- Engraving of a portrait of Brooke by his nephew, Henry Brooke
- Born: 1703; Mullagh, County Cavan, Kingdom of Ireland
- Died: 10 October 1783 (aged 80); Dublin
- Occupations: novelist, dramatist
- Notable work: The Fool of Quality (1766–70)
- Children: Charlotte Brooke

Henry Brooke (1703 – 10 October 1783) was an Irish novelist and dramatist. He was born and raised at Rantavan House near Mullagh, a village in the far south of County Cavan in Ireland, the son of a clergyman, and he later studied law at Trinity College, Dublin, but embraced literature as a career.

== Life ==
Brooke's father was The Reverend William Brooke (1669–1745), a wealthy Church of Ireland rector of Killinkere and Mullagh within the Church of Ireland Diocese of Kilmore. His mother was Lettice Digby, daughter of Simon Digby, bishop of Elphin. He had two brothers. He matriculated into Trinity College in 1720. He left for London in 1724 to study law at the Temple, but returned to Ireland following the death of his maternal aunt, and his appointment as a guardian to his cousin, Catherine Meares (1712/13–1773). They later married in secret before 1728. Brooke returned to London to recommence his legal career and embark on a literary one.

His philosophical poem Universal Beauty was published in 1735, and Alexander Pope thought its sentiments and poetry fine. He then turned dramatist by adapting extant plays, such as The Earl of Essex. His Gustavus Vasa (1739) has the distinction of being the first play banned by the Licensing Act 1737. The play concerned the liberation of Sweden from Denmark in 1521 by Riksföreståndare (Protector of the Realm or Regent) Gustav Vasa (who later became King Gustav I of Sweden). Sir Robert Walpole believed that the villain of the play resembled him. Further, a facetious "attack" on it was the first public writing of Samuel Johnson, whose A Complete Vindication of the Licensers of the English Stage feigns support for Walpole while it drives the censor's argument to reductio ad absurdum.

Brooke had a difficult life and made a very poor living. The Licensing Act 1737 robbed him of his primary avenue to making a living, for, after the Act, he was the first man banned by it. Whatever fame this lent him was made up for by his inability to get new plays performed. His greatest commercial successes came from the Earl of Essex and his two novels, The Fool of Quality (1760-1772) and Juliet Grenville (1774), which are two of the finest sentimental novels. John Wesley was so fond of The Fool of Quality, in which Brooke declares his belief in universal salvation, that he sought to have a copy of it given out to all new Methodist churches.

Brooke lived in Ireland most of his life, but he spent time in London when his plays were on the stage. In politics, he was somewhat radical in arguing publicly for loosening the laws persecuting Roman Catholics in the United Kingdom.

Later, his Earl of Essex came back to the boards in a revival. Again, Samuel Johnson offered his public support of Brooke, but when he heard the Earl saying at the end of Act II, "Who rules o'er free men must himself be free," Johnson replied, "Who drives fat oxen must himself be fat." Although Johnson was objecting to the misuse and overuse of "freedom" and was at that time in a vexatious debate over the United States War of Independence (saying, "Why is it that we hear the loudest cries for liberty from the drivers of Negroes?"), Brooke was mortified by Johnson's parody and changed the line for his Collected Works.

He had twenty-two children. Of these, only Charlotte (the second youngest) and Arthur survived adolescence. Charlotte oversaw the publication of Brooke's Works after his death, and was herself an important figure in the history of Irish literature, publishing Reliques of Irish Poetry (1789) and working to increase the profile of Irish language poetry.
