= Augustan prose =

Early 18th century English literary style

An engraved ticket for Francis Noble's circulating library in London from some time after mid-century.

Augustan prose is somewhat ill-defined, as "Augustan" refers primarily to a shift in taste regarding poetry in particular. However, the general time represented by Augustan literature also saw a rise in prose writing as high literature. The essay, satire, and dialogue (in philosophy and religion) thrived in the age, and the English novel was truly begun as a serious art form. At the outset of the Augustan age, essays were still primarily imitative, novels were few and still dominated by the Romance, and prose was a rarely used format for satire, but, by the end of the period, the English essay was a fully formed periodical feature, novels surpassed drama as entertainment and as an outlet for serious authors, and prose was serving every conceivable function in public discourse. It is the age that most provides the transition from a court-centered and poetic literature to a more democratic, decentralized literary world of prose.

== The precondition of literacy ==
Literacy rates in the early 18th century are difficult to estimate accurately. However, it appears that literacy was much higher than school enrollment would indicate and that literacy passed into the working classes, as well as the middle and upper classes (Thompson). The churches emphasized the need for every Christian to read the Bible, and instructions to landlords indicated that it was their duty to teach servants and workers how to read and to have the Bible read aloud to them. Furthermore, literacy does not appear to be confined to men, though rates of female literacy are very difficult to establish. Even where workers were not literate, however, some prose works enjoyed currency well beyond the literate, as works were read aloud to the illiterate.

For those who were literate, circulating libraries in England began in the Augustan period. The first was probably at Bath in 1725, but they spread very rapidly. Libraries purchased sermon collections and books on manners, and they were open to all, but they were associated with female patronage and novel reading. Circulating libraries were a way for women, in particular, to satisfy their desire for books without facing the expense of purchase. Inasmuch as books were still regarded principally as tools for work, any book that existed merely for entertainment was subject to a charge of frivolity. Therefore, the sales of novels and light entertainments testify to a very strong demand for these books indeed.

== The essay/journalism ==
Montesquieu's "essais" were available to English authors in the 18th century, both in French and in translation, and he exerted an influence on several later authors, both in terms of content and form, but the English essay developed independently from continental tradition. At the end of the Restoration, periodical literature began to be popular. These were combinations of news with reader's questions and commentary on the manners and news of the day. Since periodicals were inexpensive to produce, quick to read, and a viable way of influencing public opinion, their numbers increased dramatically after the success of The Athenian Mercury (flourished in the 1690s but published in book form in 1709). In the early years of the 18th century, most periodicals served as a way for a collection of friends to offer up a relatively consistent political point of view, and these periodicals were under the auspices of a bookseller.

However, one periodical outsold and dominated all others and set out an entirely new philosophy for essay writing, and that was The Spectator, written by Joseph Addison and Richard Steele. By 1711, when The Spectator began, there was already a thriving industry of periodical literature in London, but The Spectator was by far the most successful and significant periodical of the era. Each issue was a single, folio sheet of paper, printed front and back, sometimes with advertisements, and issues were not only read throughout London, but also were carried out to the countryside. Up to twenty years after publication stopped, people were counting collections of the issues among their inheritable goods. Addison's prose style was magisterial, placid, and with perfect balance of clauses. Steele's prose style was more direct than Addison's, and more worldly. The journal developed a number of pseudonymous characters, including "Mr. Spectator," Roger de Coverley, and "Isaac Bickerstaff" (a character borrowed from Jonathan Swift ). Both authors developed fictions to surround their narrators. For example, Roger de Coverley came from Coverley Hall, had a family, liked hunting, and was a solid squire. The effect was something similar to a lighthearted serial novel, intermixed with meditations on follies and philosophical musings. The paper's politics were generally Whig, but never sharply or pedantically so, and thus a number of prominent Tories wrote "letters" to the paper (the letters were generally not actual letters but, instead, contributions from guest authors). The highly Latinate sentence structures and dispassionate view of the world (the pose of a spectator, rather than participant) was essential for the development of the English essay, as it set out a ground wherein Addison and Steele could comment and meditate upon manners and events, rather than campaign for specific policies or persons (as had been the case with previous, more political periodical literature) and without having to rely upon pure entertainment (as in the question and answer format found in The Athenian Mercury). Further, the pose of the Spectator allowed author and reader to meet as peers, rather than as philosopher and student (which was the case with Montesquieu).

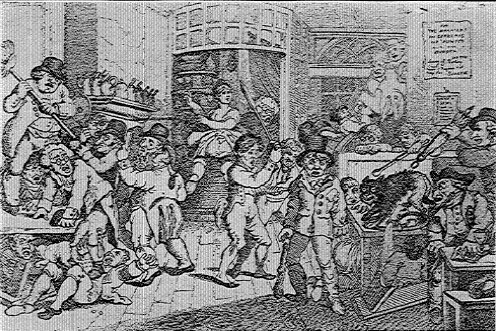
Rowlandson's caricature "Mad Dog in a Coffee-House," showing "stock jobbers" in a panic as they are terrorized by a rabid animal.

One of the cultural innovations of the late Restoration had been the coffee house and chocolate house, where patrons would gather to drink coffee or chocolate (which was a beverage like hot chocolate and was unsweetened). Each coffee shop in the city was associated with a particular type of patron. Puritan merchants favored Lloyd's, for example, and founded Lloyd's of London there. However, Button's and Will's coffee shops attracted writers, and Addison and Steele became the center of their own Kit-Kat Club and exerted a powerful influence over which authors rose or fell in reputation. (This would be satirized by Alexander Pope later, as Atticus acting as a petty tyrant to a "little senate" of sycophants.) Addison's essays, and to a lesser extent Steele's, helped set the critical framework for the time. Addison's essays on the imagination were highly influential as distillations and reformulations of aesthetic philosophy. Mr. Spectator would comment upon fashions, the vanity of women, the emptiness of conversation, and the folly of youth.

After the success of The Spectator, more political periodicals of comment appeared, including the vaguely Tory The Guardian and The Observer (note that none of these periodicals continued to the present day without interruption). Edward Cave created the first general-interest magazine in 1731 with The Gentleman's Magazine. He was the first to use the term "magazine" on the analogy of a military storehouse of varied material. The Gentleman's Quarterly began soon after. Some of these journals featured news more than commentary, and others featured reviews of recent works of literature. Many periodicals came from the area of the Inns of Court, which had been associated with a bohemian lifestyle since the 1670s. Samuel Johnson's later The Rambler and The Idler would self-consciously recreate the pose of Mr. Spectator to give a platform for musings and philosophy, as well as literary criticism.

However, the political factions (historian Louis B. Namier reminds us that officially there were no political parties in England at this time, even though those living in London referred to them quite often) and coalitions of politicians very quickly realized the power of the press, and they began funding newspapers to spread rumors. The Tory ministry of Robert Harley (1710–1714) reportedly spent over 50,000 pounds sterling on creating and bribing the press. Politicians wrote papers, wrote into papers, and supported papers, and it was well known that some of the periodicals, like Mist's Journal, were party mouthpieces.

== Philosophy and religious writing ==
In contrast to the Restoration period, the Augustan period showed less literature of controversy. Compared to the extraordinary energy that produced Richard Baxter, George Fox, Gerrard Winstanley, and William Penn, the literature of dissenting religious in the first half of the 18th century was spent. One of the names usually associated with the novel is perhaps the most prominent in Puritan writing: Daniel Defoe. After the coronation of Anne, dissenter hopes of reversing the Restoration were at an ebb. Further, the Act of Settlement 1701 had removed one of their prime rallying points, for it was now somewhat sure that England would not become Roman Catholic. Therefore, dissenter literature moved from the offensive to the defensive, from revolutionary to conservative. Thus, Defoe's infamous volley in the struggle between high and low church came in the form of The Shortest Way with the Dissenters; Or, Proposals for the Establishment of the Church. The work is satirical, attacking all of the worries of Establishment figures over the challenges of dissenters. It is, therefore, an attack upon attackers and differs subtly from the literature of dissent found fifteen years earlier. For his efforts, Defoe was put in the pillory. He would continue his Puritan campaigning in his journalism and novels, but never again with public satire of this sort.

Instead of wild battles of religious controversy, the early 18th century was a time of emergent, de facto latitudinarianism. The Hanoverian kings distanced themselves from church politics and polity and themselves favored low church positions. Anne took few clear positions on church matters. The most majestic work of the era, and the one most quoted and read, was William Law's A Serious Call to a Devout and Holy Life (1728) (see his online works, below). Although Law was a non-juror, his book was orthodox to all Protestants in England at the time and moved its readers to contemplate and practice their Christianity more devoutly. The Meditations of Robert Boyle remained popular as well. Both of these works called for revivalism, and they set the stage for the later development of Methodism and George Whitefield's sermon style. They were works for the individual, rather than for the community. They were non-public and concentrated on the priesthood of all believers notion of an individual revelation.

Also in contrast to the Restoration, when philosophy in England was so fully dominated by John Locke that few other voices are remembered today, the 18th century had a vigorous competition among followers of Locke, and philosophical writing was strong. Bishop George Berkeley and David Hume are the best remembered major philosophers of 18th-century England, but other philosophers adapted the political ramifications of empiricism, including Bernard de Mandeville, Charles Davenant, and Adam Smith. All of these figures can be considered empiricists, for they all begin with the relative certainty of perception, but they reach vastly different conclusions.

Bishop Berkeley extended Locke's emphasis on perception to argue that perception entirely solves the Cartesian problem of subjective and objective knowledge by saying "to be is to be perceived." Only, Berkeley argued, those things that are perceived by a consciousness are real. If there is no perception of a thing, then that thing cannot exist. Further, it is not the potential of perception that lends existence, but the actuality of perception. When Samuel Johnson flippantly kicked a rock and "thus...refute(d) Berkeley," his kick only affirmed Berkeley's position, for by perceiving the rock, Johnson had given it greater reality. However, Berkeley's empiricism was designed, at least partially, to lead to the question of who observes and perceives those things that are absent or undiscovered. For Berkeley, the persistence of matter rests in the fact that God is perceiving those things that humans are not, that a living and continually aware, attentive, and involved God is the only rational explanation for the existence of objective matter. In essence, then, Berkeley's skepticism leads inevitably to faith.

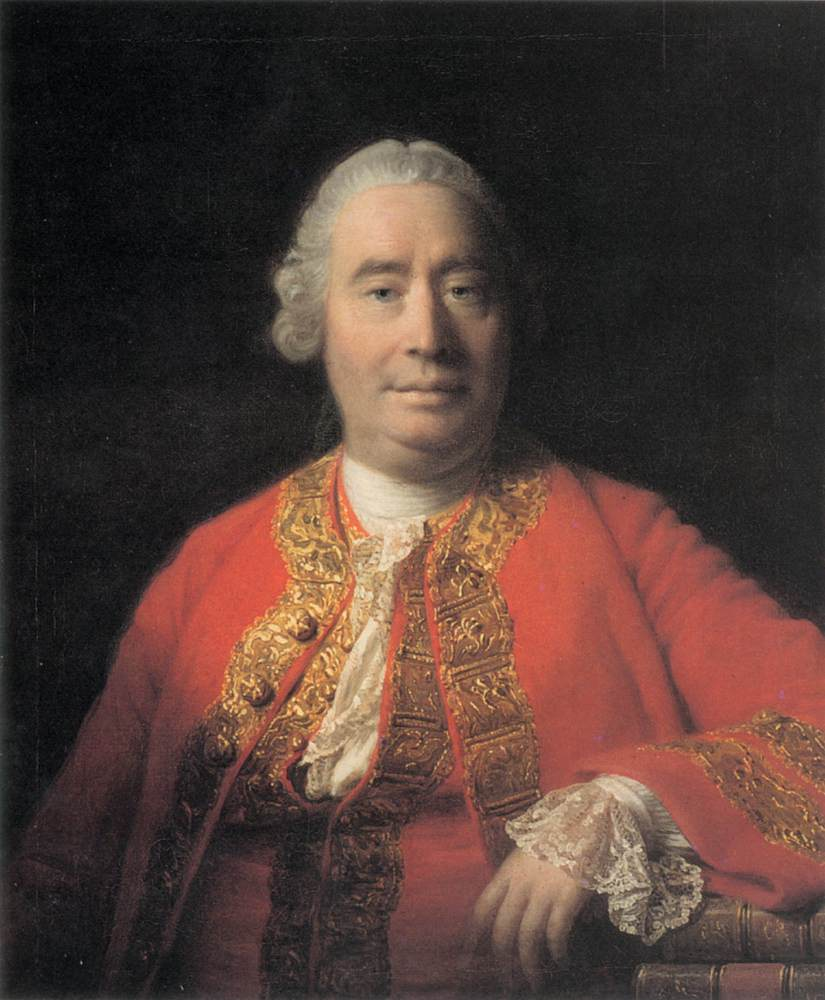
David Hume

David Hume, on the other hand, was the most radically empiricist philosopher of the period. He attacked surmise and unexamined premises wherever he found them, and his skepticism pointed out metaphysics in areas that other empiricists had assumed were material. Hume attacked the weakness of inductive logic and the apparently mystical assumptions behind key concepts such as energy and causality. (E.g. has anyone ever seen energy as energy? Are related events demonstrably causal instead of coincident?) Hume doggedly refused to enter into questions of his faith in the divine, but his assault on the logic and assumptions of theodicy and cosmogeny was devastating. He was an anti-apologist without ever agreeing to be atheist. Later philosophers have seen in Hume a basis for Utilitarianism and naturalism.

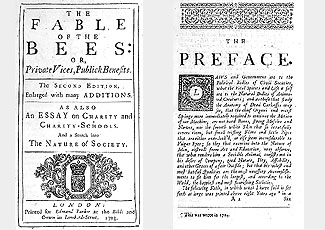
Title page to the 1705 edition of Bernard de Mandeville's Fable of the Bees.

In social and political philosophy, economics underlies much of the debate. Charles Davenant, writing as a radical Whig, was the first to propose a theoretical argument on trade and virtue with his A Discourse on Grants and Resumptions and Essays on the Balance of Power (1701). However, Davenant's work was not directly very influential. On the other hand, Bernard de Mandeville's The Fable of the Bees became a centerpoint of controversy regarding trade, morality, and social ethics. It was initially a short poem called The Grumbling Hive, or Knaves Turn'd Honest in 1705. However, in 1714 he published it with its current title, The Fable of the Bees: or, Private Vices, Public Benefits and included An Enquiry into the Origin of Moral Virtue. Mandeville argued that wastefulness, lust, pride, and all the other "private" vices (those applying to the person's mental state, rather than the person's public actions) were good for the society at large, for each led the individual to employ others, to spend freely, and to free capital to flow through the economy. William Law attacked the work, as did Bishop Berkeley (in the second dialogue of Alciphron in 1732). In 1729, when a new edition appeared, the book was prosecuted as a public nuisance. It was also denounced in the periodicals. John Brown attacked it in his Essay upon Shaftesbury's Characteristics (1751). It was reprinted again in 1755. Although there was a serious political and economic philosophy that derived from Mandeville's argument, it was initially written as a satire on the Duke of Marlborough's taking England to war for his personal enrichment. Mandeville's work is full of paradox and is meant, at least partially, to problematize what he saw as the naive philosophy of human progress and inherent virtue.

=== After 1750 ===
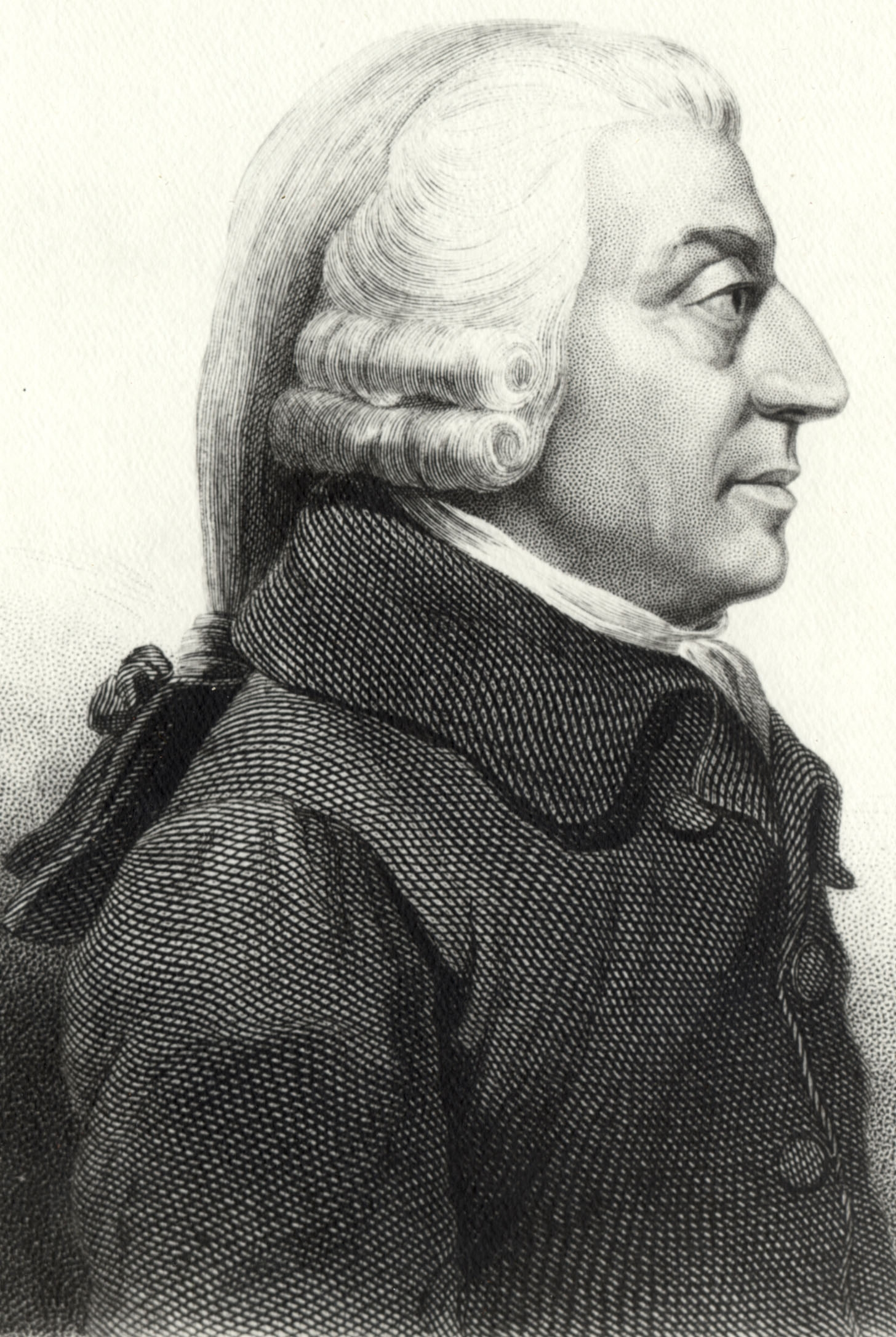
Charcoal sketch of Adam Smith.

Adam Smith is remembered by lay persons as the father of capitalism, but his Theory of Moral Sentiments of 1759 attempted to strike out a new ground for moral action. His emphasis on "sentiment" was in keeping with the era, as he emphasized the need for "sympathy" between individuals as the basis of fit action. The idea, first rudimentally presented in Locke's Essay on Human Understanding, of a natural coherence between sensible beings being necessary for communication not only of words, but of emotions and states of being, was here brought out more fully. While Francis Hutcheson had presupposed a separate sense in humans for morality (akin to conscience but more primitive and more native), Smith argued that moral sentiment is communicated, that it is spread by what might be better called empathy. These ideas had been satirized already by wits like Jonathan Swift (who insisted that readers of his A Tale of a Tub would be incapable of understanding it unless, like him, they were poor, hungry, had just had wine, and were located in a specific garret), but they were, through Smith and David Hartley, influential on the sentimental novel and even the nascent Methodist movement. If sympathetic sentiment communicated morality, would it not be possible to induce morality by providing sympathetic circumstances?

Smith's greatest work was An Inquiry into the Nature and Causes of the Wealth of Nations in 1776. What it held in common with de Mandeville, Hume, and Locke was that it began by analytically examining the history of material exchange, without reflection on morality. Instead of deducing from the ideal to the real, it examined the real and tried to formulate inductive rules. However, unlike Charles Davenant and the other radical Whig authors (including Daniel Defoe), it also did not begin with a desired outcome and work backward to deduce policy. Smith instead worked from a strictly empiricist basis to create the conceptual framework for an analytical economics.

== The novel ==
As has been indicated above, the ground for the novel had been laid by journalism. It had also been laid by drama and by satire. Long prose satires like Swift's Gulliver's Travels (1726) had a central character who goes through adventures and may (or may not) learn lessons. In fact, satires and philosophical works like Thomas More's Utopia (1516), Rabelais's Gargantua and Pantagruel (1532–64), and even Erasmus's In Praise of Folly (1511) had established long fictions subservient to a philosophical purpose. However, the most important single satirical source for the writing of novels came from Miguel de Cervantes' Don Quixote (1605, 1615), which had been quickly translated from Spanish into other European languages including English. It would never go out of print, and the Augustan age saw many free translations in varying styles, by journalists (Ned Ward, 1700 and Peter Motteux, 1712) as well as novelists (Tobias Smollett, 1755). In general, one can see these three axes, drama, journalism, and satire, as blending in and giving rise to three different types of novel.

Aphra Behn had written literary novels before the turn of the 18th century, but there were not many immediate successors. Behn's Love-Letters Between a Nobleman and His Sister (1684) had been bred in satire, and her Oroonoko (1688) had come from her theatrical experience. Delarivier Manley's New Atlantis (1709) comes closest to an inheritor of Behn's, but her novel, while political and satirical, was a minor scandal. On the other hand, Daniel Defoe's Robinson Crusoe (1719) was the first major novel of the new century. Defoe had written political and religious polemics prior to Robinson Crusoe, and he worked as a journalist during and after its composition. Thus, Defoe encountered the memoirs of Alexander Selkirk, who was a rather brutish individual who had been stranded in South America on an island for some years. Defoe took the actual life and, from that, generated a fictional life. Instead of an expelled Scotsman, Crusoe became a devout Puritan. Instead of remaining alone the entire time, Crusoe encountered a savage named Friday, whom he civilized. The actual Selkirk had been a slave trader, and Crusoe becomes a far more enlightened teacher and missionary. Travel writing sold very well during the period, and tales of extraordinary adventures with pirates and savages were devoured by the public, and Defoe satisfied an essentially journalistic market with his fiction.

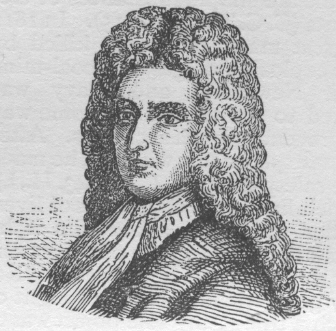
Woodcut of Daniel Defoe.

Defoe would continue to draw from life and news for his next novels. In the 1720s, Defoe wrote "Lives" of criminals for Applebee's Journal. He interviewed famed criminals and produced accounts of their lives. Whenever a celebrated criminal was hanged, the newspapers and journals would offer up an account of the criminal's life, the criminal's last words, the criminal's gallows speech, etc., and Defoe wrote several of these. In particular, he investigated Jack Sheppard and Jonathan Wild and wrote True Accounts of the former's escapes (and fate) and the latter's life. Defoe, unlike his competition, seems to have been a scrupulous journalist. Although his fictions contained great imagination and a masterful shaping of facts to build themes, his journalism seems based on actual investigation. From his reportage on the prostitutes and criminals, Defoe may have become familiar with the real-life Mary Mollineaux, who may have been the model for Moll in Moll Flanders (1722). As with the transformation of a real Selkirk into a fictional Crusoe, the fictional Moll is everything that the real prostitute was not. She pursues a wild career of material gain, travels to Maryland, commits incest, returns to England, and repents of her sins. She returns to the new land of promise for all Puritans of Maryland, where she lives honestly, with a great sum of money (derived from her licentious life). In the same year, Defoe produced a flatly journalistic A Journal of the Plague Year (1722), and an attempted tale of a working class male rise in Colonel Jack (1722). His last novel returned to the theme of fallen women in Roxana: The Fortunate Mistress (1724). Thematically, Defoe's works are consistently Puritan. They all involve a fall, a degradation of the spirit, a conversion, and an ecstatic elevation. This religious structure necessarily involved a bildungsroman, for each character had to learn a lesson about him or herself and emerge the wiser.

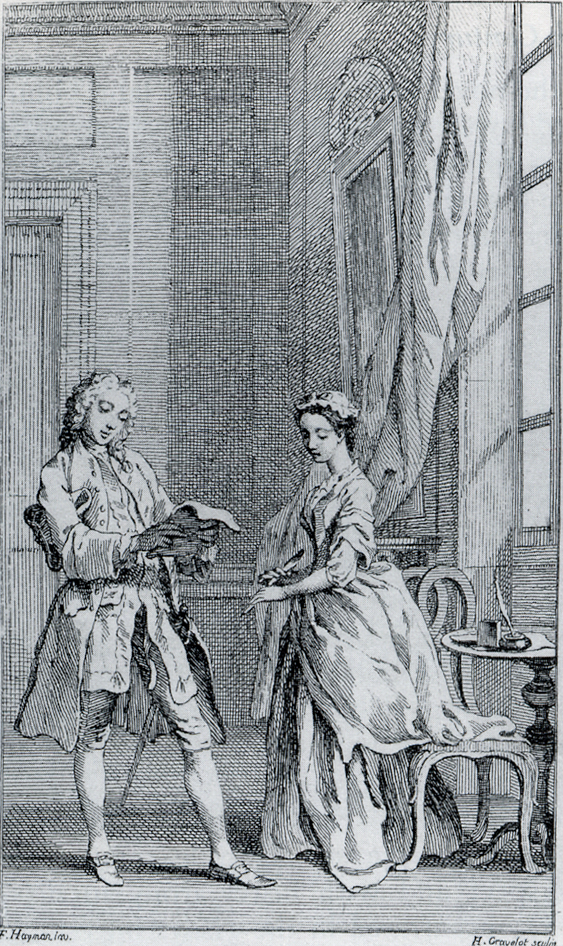
An illustration from the 1742 edition of Pamela showing Mr. B intercepting Pamela's first letter to her mother and reading it.

Although there were other novels and novelistic works in the interim, Samuel Richardson's Pamela, or Virtue Rewarded (1740) is the next landmark development in the English novel. Richardson was, like Defoe, a dissenter. Unlike Defoe, however, his profession was as a printer rather than a journalist. Therefore, his generic models were quite distinct from those of Defoe. Instead of working from the journalistic biography, Richardson had in mind the dramatic cautionary tales of abused women and the books of improvement that were popular at the time. Pamela is an epistolary novel, like Behn's Love Letters, but its purpose is to illustrate a single chapter in the life of a poor country girl. Pamela Andrews enters the employ of a "Mr. B." As a dutiful girl, she writes to her mother constantly, and as a Christian girl, she is always on guard for her "virtue" (i.e. her virginity), for Mr. B lusts after her. The plot is somewhat melodramatic, and it is pathetic: the reader's sympathies and fears are engaged throughout, and the novel comes close to the She-tragedy of the close of the 17th century in its depiction of a woman as a victim. However, Pamela triumphs. She acts as an angel for the reformation of Mr. B, and the novel ends with her marriage to her employer and rising to the position of lady.

Pamela, like its author, presents a dissenter's and a Whig's view of the rise of the classes. It emphasizes duty and perseverance of the saint, and the work was an enormous popular success. It also drew a nearly instantaneous set of satires. Henry Fielding's response was to link Richardson's virtuous girl with Colley Cibber's shamefaced Apology in the form of Shamela, or an Apology for the Life of Miss Shamela Andrews (1742) and it is the most memorable of the "answers" to Richardson. First, it inaugurated the rivalry between the two authors. Second, beneath the very loose and ribald satire, there is a coherent and rational critique of Richardson's themes. In Fielding's satire, Pamela, as Shamela, writes like a country peasant instead of a learned Londoner (as Pamela had), and it is her goal from the moment she arrives in Squire Booby's (as Mr. B is called) house to become lady of the place by selling her "vartue." Fielding also satirizes the presumption that a woman could write of dramatic, ongoing events ("He comes abed now, Mama. O Lud, my vartu! My vartu!"). Specifically, Fielding thought that Richardson's novel was very good, very well written, and very dangerous, for it offered serving women the illusion that they might sleep their way to wealth and an elevated title. In truth, Fielding saw serving women abused and lords reneging on both their spiritual conversions and promises.

After the coarse satire of Shamela, Fielding continued to bait Richardson with Joseph Andrews. Shamela had appeared anonymously, but Fielding published Joseph Andrews under his own name, also in 1742. Joseph Andrews is the tale of Shamela's brother, Joseph, who goes through his life trying to protect his own virginity. Women, rather than men, are the sexual aggressors, and Joseph seeks only to find his place and his true love, Fanny, and accompany his childhood friend, Parson Adams, who is travelling to London to sell a collection of sermons to a bookseller in order to feed his large family. Since the term "fanny" had obscene implications in the 18th century, Joseph's longings for "my Fanny" survive as satirical blows, and the inversion of sexual predation strips bare the essentials of Richardson's valuation of virginity. However, Joseph Andrews is not a parody of Richardson. In that novel, Fielding proposed for the first time his belief in "good nature." Parson Adams, although not a fool, is a naif. His own basic good nature blinds him to the wickedness of the world, and the incidents on the road (for most of the novel is a travel story) allow Fielding to satirize conditions for the clergy, rural poverty (and squires), and the viciousness of businessmen. Fielding's novels arise out of a satirical model, and the same year that he wrote Joseph Andrews, he also wrote a work that parodied Daniel Defoe's criminal biographies: The History of Jonathan Wild the Great. Jonathan Wild was published in Fielding's Miscellanies, and it is a thorough-going assault on the Whig party. It pretends to tell of the greatness of Jonathan Wild, but Wild is a stand-in for Robert Walpole, who was known as "the Great Man."

In 1747 through 1748, Samuel Richardson published Clarissa; or, The History of a Young Lady in serial form. Like Pamela, it is an epistolary novel. Unlike Pamela, it is not a tale of virtue rewarded. Instead, it is a highly tragic and affecting account of a young girl whose parents try to force her into an uncongenial marriage, thus pushing her into the arms of a scheming rake named Lovelace. Lovelace is far more wicked than Mr. B. He imprisons Clarissa and tortures her psychologically in an effort to get her consent to marriage. Eventually, Clarissa is violated (whether by Lovelace or the household maids is unclear). Her letters to her parents are pleading, while Lovelace is sophisticated and manipulative. Most of Clarissa's letters are to her childhood friend, Anna Howe. Lovelace is not consciously evil, for he will not simply rape Clarissa. He desires her free consent, which Clarissa will not give. In the end, Clarissa dies by her own will. The novel is a masterpiece of psychological realism and emotional effect, and, when Richardson was drawing to a close in the serial publication, even Henry Fielding wrote to him, begging him not to kill Clarissa. There are many themes in play in Clarissa. Most obviously, the novel is a strong argument for romantic love and against arranged marriages. Clarissa will marry, but she wishes to have her own say in choice of mate. As with Pamela, Richardson emphasizes the individual over the social and the personal over the class. His work was part of a general valuation of the individual over and against the social good.

Even as Fielding was reading and enjoying Clarissa, he was also writing a counter to its messages. His Tom Jones of 1749 offers up the other side of the argument from Clarissa. Tom Jones agrees substantially in the power of the individual to be more or less than his or her class, but it again emphasizes the place of the individual in society and the social ramifications of individual choices. While Clarissa cloisters its characters geographically to a house imprisonment and isolates them to their own subjective impressions in the form of letters, Fielding's Tom Jones employs a third person narrative and features a narrator who is virtually another character in the novel itself. Fielding constantly disrupts the illusionary identification of the reader with the characters by referring to the prose itself and uses his narrative style to posit antitheses of characters and action. Tom is a bastard and a foundling who is cared for by Squire Allworthy, who is a man of great good nature. This squire is benevolent and salutary to his community and his family. Allworthy's sister has a child who is born to a high position but who has a vicious nature. Allworthy, in accordance with Christian principles, treats the boys alike. Tom falls in love with Sophia, the daughter of a neighboring squire, and then has to win her hand. It is society that interferes with Tom, and not personified evil. Fielding answers Richardson by featuring a similar plot device (whether a girl can choose her own mate) but by showing how family and village can complicate and expedite matches and felicity.

Henry Fielding's sister, Sarah Fielding, was also a novelist. Her David Simple (1744) outsold Joseph Andrews and was popular enough to require sequels. Like her brother, Sarah propounds a theory of good nature. David Simple is, as his name suggests, an innocent. He is possessed of a benevolent disposition and a desire to please, and the pressures and contradictory impulses of society complicate the plot. On the one hand, this novel emphasizes the role of society, but, on the other, it is a novel that sets up the sentimental novel. The genuine compassion and desire for goodness of David Simple were affecting for contemporary audiences, David Simple is a forerunner of the heroes of later novels such as Henry Mackenzie's The Man of Feeling (1771).

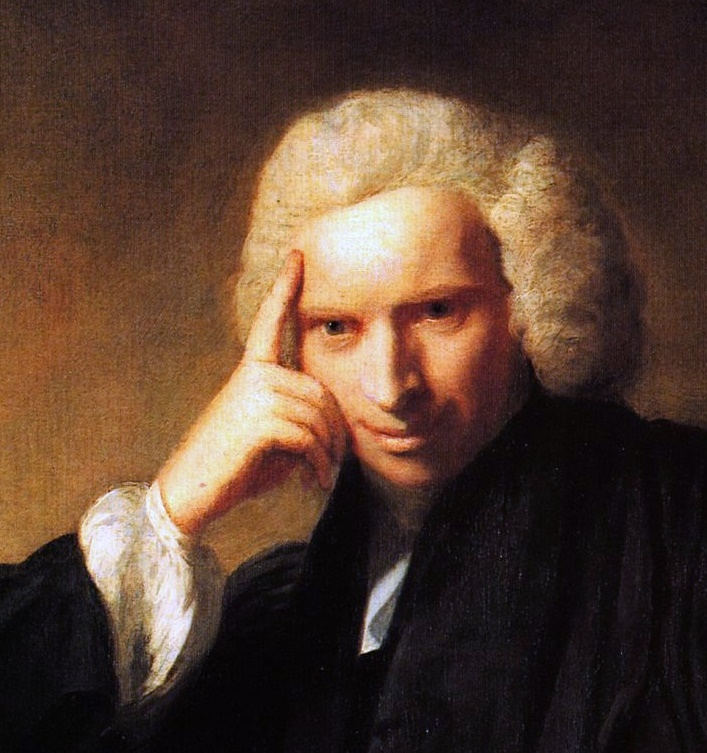
The most famous portrait of Laurence Sterne by Joshua Reynolds, showing him in a pose of considering a witticism or of ironic detachment.

Two other novelists should be mentioned, for they, like Fielding and Richardson, were in dialog through their works. Laurence Sterne and Tobias Smollett held a personal dislike for one another, and their works similarly offered up oppositional views of the self in society and the method of the novel. Laurence Sterne was a clergyman, and he consciously set out to imitate Jonathan Swift with his Tristram Shandy (1759–1767). The Life and Opinions of Tristram Shandy, gentleman was a stylistic and formal revolution for the novel. Like Swift's satires, it begins with radical skepticism and a willingness to break apart figurative language and commonplace assumptions. The novel in three books is virtually all narrative voice, with a few interpolated narratives, such as "Slawkenbergius's Tale." Tristram seeks to write his autobiography, but like Swift's narrator in A Tale of a Tub, he worries that nothing in his life can be understood without understanding its context. For example, he tells the reader that at the very moment he was conceived, his mother was saying, "Did you wind the clock?" To explain how he knows this, he explains that his father took care of winding the clock and "other family business" on one day a month. To explain why the clock had to be wound then, he has to explain his father. To explain his father, he must explain a habit of his uncle's (referred to as "My Uncle Toby"), and that requires knowing what his uncle did during the War of the Spanish Succession at the Battle of Namur. In other words, the biography moves backward rather than forward in time, only to then jump forward years, hit another knot, and move backward again. Further, Sterne provides "plot diagrams" for his readers that look like a ball of yarn. When a character dies, the next page of the book is black, in mourning. At one point, there is an end paper inserted into the text as a false ending to the book. It is a novel of exceptional energy, of multi-layered digressions, of multiple satires, and of frequent parodies. It was so experimental that Samuel Johnson later famously used it as an example of a fad when he said that nothing novel can sustain itself, for "Tristram Shandy did not last."

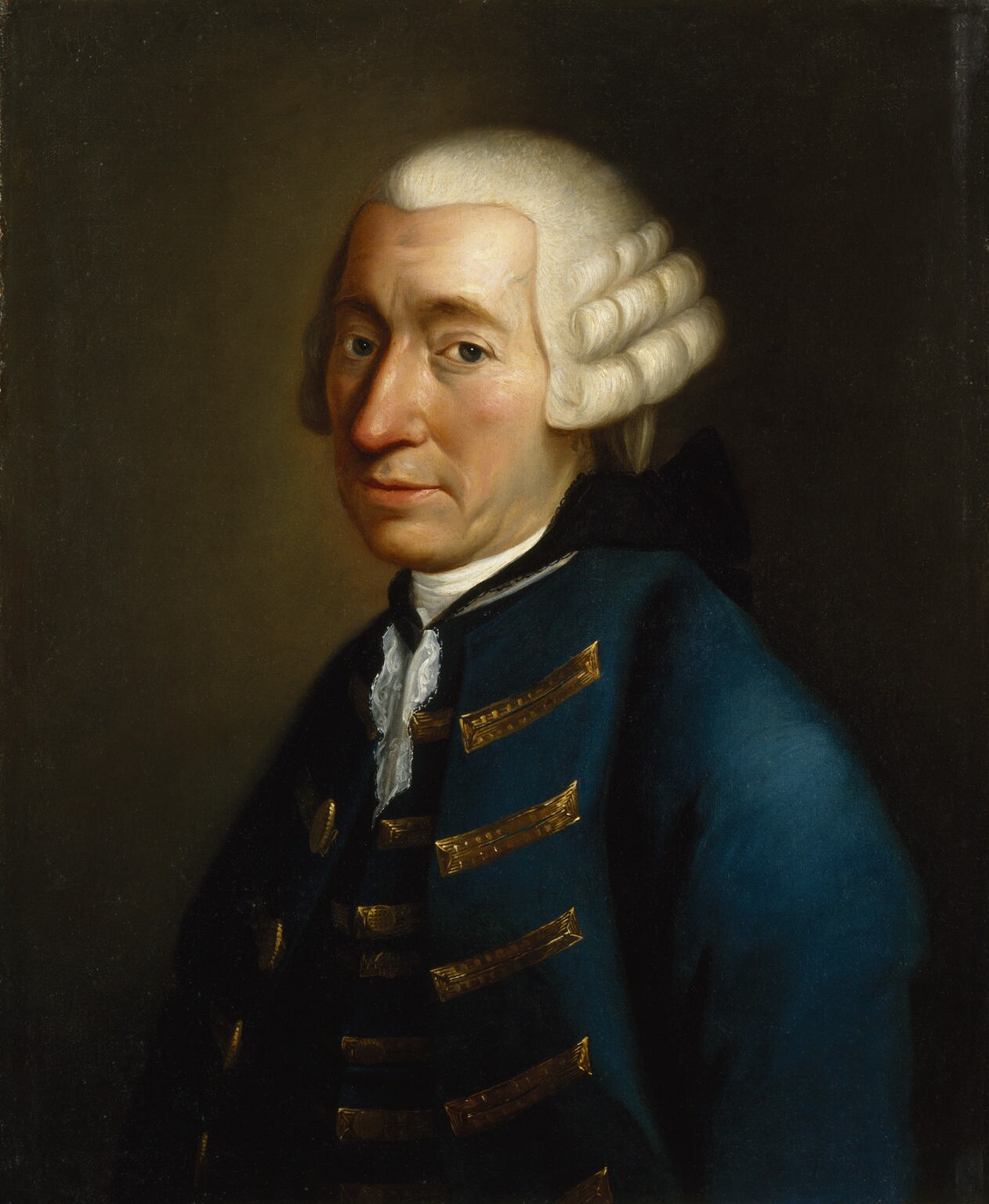
Portrait of Tobias Smollett.

Tobias Smollett, on the other hand, wrote more seemingly traditional novels (although the novel was still too new to have much of a tradition). He concentrated on the picaresque novel, where a low-born character would go through a practically endless series of adventures that would carry him into various cities and circles of high life and achieve either a great gain (in a comic ending) or a great loss. Unlike Sterne, who only published two novels, or Fielding, who died before he could manage more than four novels, Smollett was prolific. He wrote the following and more: The Adventures of Roderick Random (1748), The Adventures of Peregrine Pickle (1751), The Adventures of Ferdinand Count Fathom (1753), The Life and Adventures of Sir Launcelot Greaves (1762), The History and Adventures of an Atom (1769), and The Expedition of Humphry Clinker (1771). Smollett depended upon his pen for his livelihood, and so he also wrote history and political tracts. Smollett was also a highly valued translator. He translated both Don Quixote and Alain Rene LeSage's Gil Blas (1748). These two translated works show to some degree Smollett's personal preferences and models, for they are both rambling, open-ended novels with highly complex plots and comedy both witty and earthy. Sterne's primary attack on Smollett was personal, for the two men did not like each other, but he referred to Smollett as "Smelfungus." He thought that Smollett's novels always paid undue attention to the basest and most common elements of life, that they emphasized the dirt. Although this is a superficial complaint, it points to an important difference between the two as authors. Sterne came to the novel from a satirical background, while Smollett approached it from journalism. Sterne's pose is ironic, detached, and amused. For Sterne, the novel itself is secondary to the purpose of the novel, and that purpose was to pose difficult problems, on the one hand, and to elevate the reader, on the other (with his Sentimental Journey). Smollett's characters are desperately working to attain relief from imposition and pain, and they have little choice but to travel and strive. The plot of the novel drives the theme, and not the theme the plot. In the 19th century, novelists would have plots much nearer to Smollett's than either Fielding's or Sterne's or Richardson's, and his sprawling, linear development of action would prove most successful. However, Smollett's novels are not thematically tightly organized, and action appears solely for its ability to divert the reader, rather than to reinforce a philosophical point. The exception to this is Smollett's last novel, Humphry Clinker, written during Smollett's final illness. That novel adopts the epistolary framework previously seen in Richardson, but to document a long journey taken by a family. All of the family members and servants get a coach and travel for weeks, experiencing a number of complications and set-backs. The letters come from all of the members of the entourage, and not just the patriarch or matriarch. They exhibit numerous voices, from the witty and learned Oxford University student, Jerry (who is annoyed to accompany his family), to the eruptive patriarch Matthew Bramble, to the nearly illiterate servant Wynn Jenkins (whose writing contains many malapropisms). The title character doesn't appear until over halfway through the novel, and he is only a coachman who turns out to be better than his station (and is revealed to be Matt Bramble's bastard son).

=== Later novels/other trends ===
In the midst of this development of the novel, other trends were taking place. The novel of sentiment was beginning in the 1760s and would experience a brief period of dominance. This type of novel emphasized sympathy. In keeping with the philosophy of Hartley (see above), the sentimental novel concentrated on characters who are quickly moved to labile swings of mood and extraordinary empathy.

At the same time, women were writing novels and moving away from the old romance plots that had dominated before the Restoration. There were utopian novels, like Sarah Scott's Millenium Hall (1762), autobiographical women's novels like Frances Burney's works, female adaptations of older, male motifs, such as Charlotte Lennox's The Female Quixote (1752) and many others. These novels do not generally follow a strict line of development or influence. However, they were popular works that were celebrated by both male and female readers and critics.

=== Historians of the novel ===
Ian Watt's The Rise of the Novel (1957) still dominates attempts at writing a history of the novel. Watt's view is that the critical feature of the 18th-century novel is the creation of psychological realism. This feature, he argued, would continue on and influence the novel as it has been known in the 20th century, and therefore those novels that created it are, in fact, the true progenitors of the novel. Although Watt thought Tristram Shandy was the finest novel of the century, he also regarded it as being a stylistic cul-de-sac. Since Watt's work, numerous theorists and historians have attempted to answer the limitations of his assumptions.

Michael McKeon, for example, brought a Marxist approach to the history of the novel in his 1986 The Origins of the English Novel. McKeon viewed the novel as emerging as a constant battleground between two developments of two sets of world view that corresponded to Whig/Tory, Dissenter/Establishment, and Capitalist/Persistent Feudalist. The "novel," for him, is the synthesis of competing and clashing theses and antitheses of individual novels. I.e. the "novel" is the process of negotiation and conflict between competing ideologies, rather than a definable and fixed set of thematic or generic conventions.

== Satire (unclassified) ==
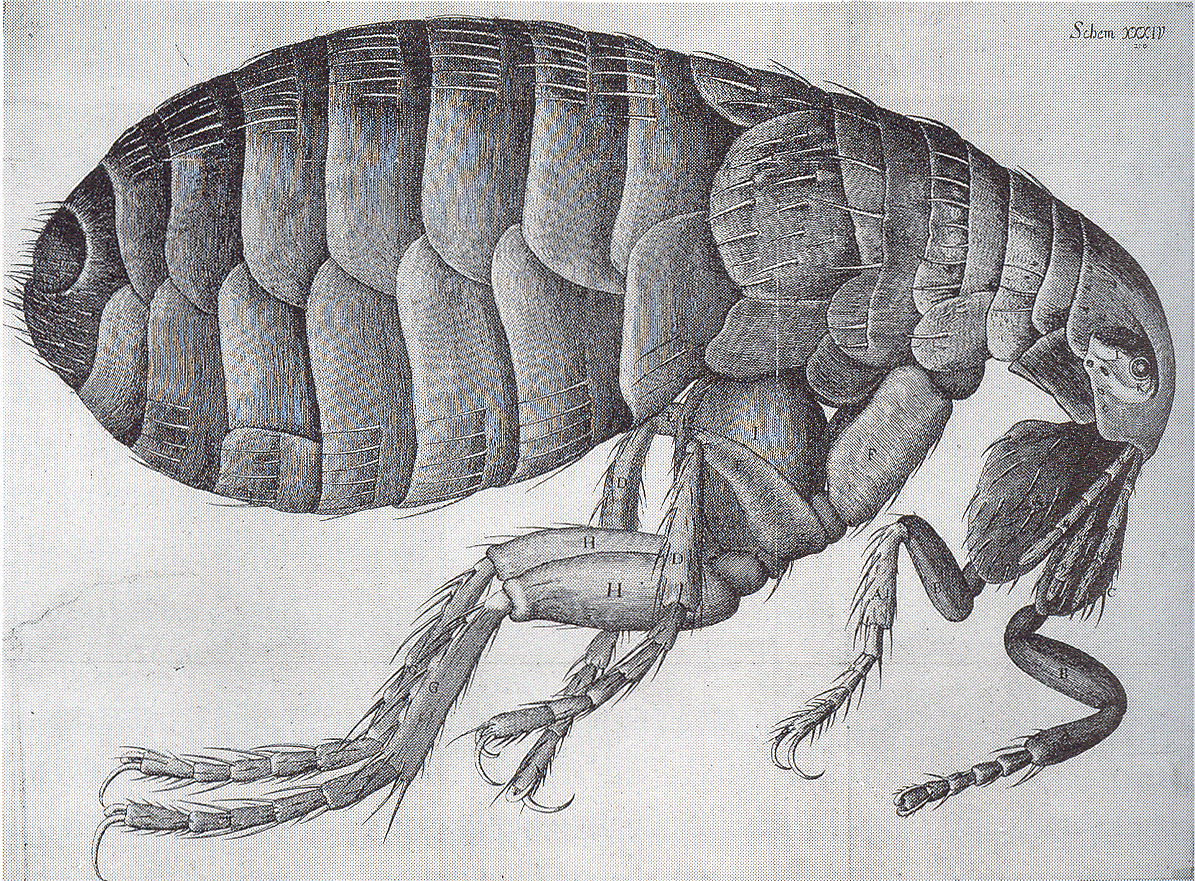
Image a flea from Robert Hooke's work with the Royal Society. It is an image that affected Jonathan Swift's poetry and prose.

A single name overshadows all others in 18th-century prose satire: Jonathan Swift. Swift wrote poetry as well as prose, and his satires range over all topics. Critically, Swift's satire marked the development of prose parody away from simple satire or burlesque. A burlesque or lampoon in prose would imitate a despised author and quickly move to reductio ad absurdum by having the victim say things coarse or idiotic. On the other hand, other satires would argue against a habit, practice, or policy by making fun of its reach or composition or methods. What Swift did was to combine parody, with its imitation of form and style of another, and satire in prose. Swift's works would pretend to speak in the voice of an opponent and imitate the style of the opponent and have the parodic work itself be the satire: the imitation would have subtle betrayals of the argument but would not be obviously absurd. For example, in A Modest Proposal (1729), Swift imitates the "projector." As indicated above, the book shops were filled with single sheets and pamphlets proposing economic panacea. These projectors would slavishly write according to the rules of rhetoric that they had learned in school by stating the case, establishing that they have no interest in the outcome, and then offering a solution before enumerating the profits of the plan. Swift does the same, but the proposed solution (cannibalism) is immoral. There is very little logically wrong with the proposal, but it is unquestionably morally abhorrent, and it can only be acceptable if one regards the Irish as kine. The parody of an enemy is note-perfect, and the satire comes not from grotesque exaggerations of style, but in the extra-literary realm of morality and ethics.

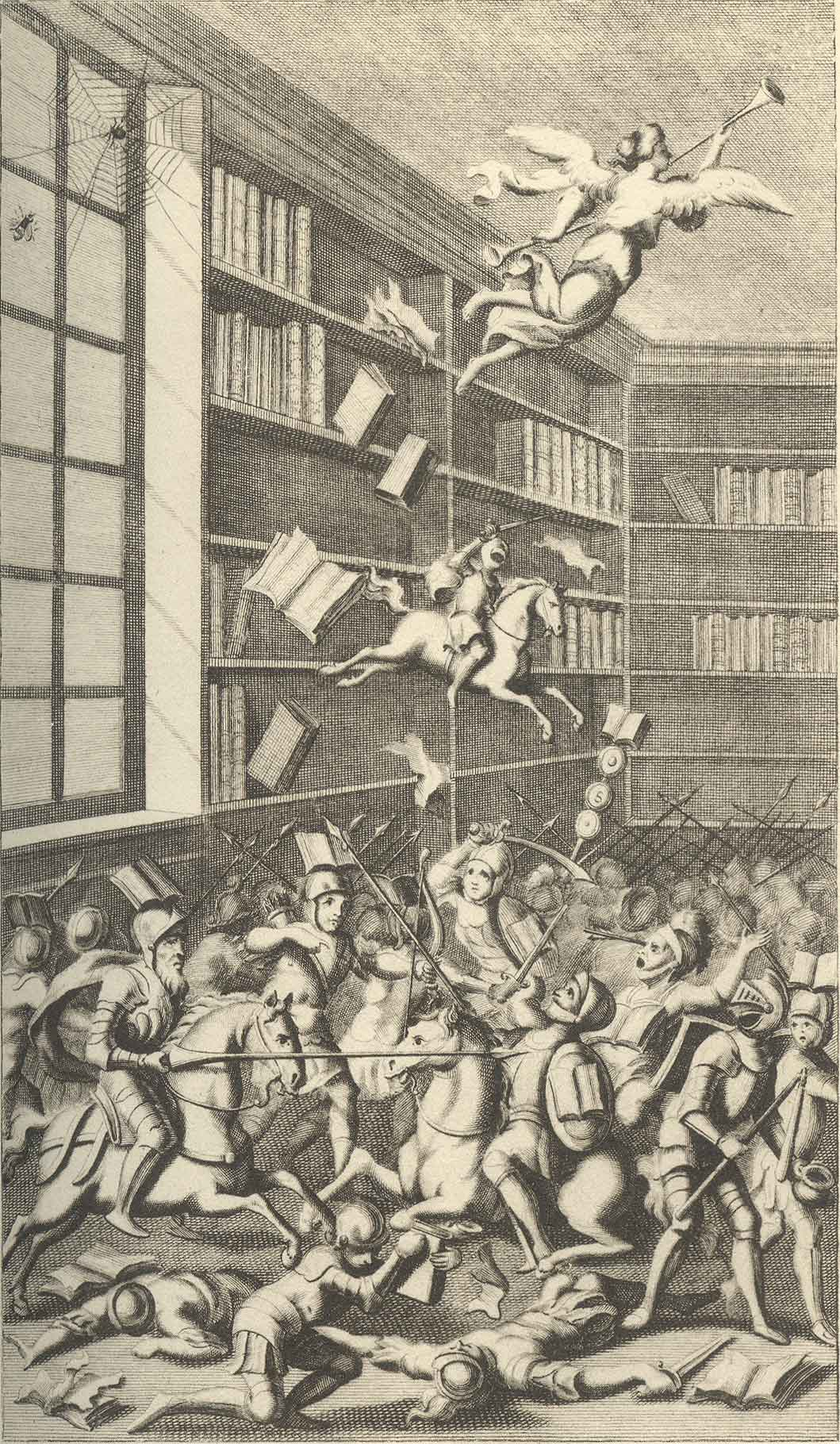
Illustration from Swift's Battle of the Books (1705), showing the ancient authors doing battle with the moderns, while a spider and a bee argue in a corner above the scene and fame blows her "posterior trumpet."

Jonathan Swift's first major satire was A Tale of a Tub (1703–1705). That satire introduced an ancients/moderns division that would serve as a handy distinction between the old and new conception of value. The "moderns" sought trade, empirical science, the individual's reason above the society's, and the rapid dissemination of knowledge, while the "ancients" believed in inherent and immanent value of birth, the society over the individual's determinations of the good, and rigorous education. In Swift's satire, the moderns come out looking insane and proud of their insanity, dismissive of the value of history, and incapable of understanding figurative language because unschooled. In Swift's most significant satire, Gulliver's Travels (1726), autobiography, allegory, and philosophy mix together in the travels. Under the umbrella of a parody of travel writing (such as Defoe's, but more particularly the fantastic and oriental tales that were circulating in London), Swift's Gulliver travels to Liliput, a figurative London beset by a figurative Paris, and sees all of the factionalism and schism as trifles of small men. He travels then to an idealized nation with a philosopher king in Brobdingnag, where Gulliver's own London is summed up in the king's saying, "I cannot but conclude the bulk of your natives to be the most pernicious race of odious little vermin Nature ever suffered to crawl upon the face of the earth." Gulliver then moves beyond the philosophical kingdom to the land of the Houyhnhnms, a society of horses ruled by pure reason, where humanity itself is portrayed as a group of "yahoos" covered in filth and dominated by base desires. Swift later added a new third book to the satire, a heterogeneous book of travels to Laputa, Balnibarbi, Glubdubdribb, Luggnagg, and Japan. This book's primary satire is on empiricism and the Royal Society, whose reports Swift read. "Projectors" of all sorts live in the Academy of Lagado, a flying island (London) that saps all the nourishment from the land below (the countryside) and occasionally crushes, literally, troublesome cities (Dublin). Thematically, Gulliver's Travels is a critique of human vanity, of pride. Book one begins with the world as it is. Book two shows that an ideal philosopher kingdom is no home for a contemporary Englishman. Book three shows the uselessness and actual evil of indulging the passions of science without connection to the realm of simple production and consumption. Book four shows that, indeed, the very desire for reason may be undesirable, and humans must struggle to be neither Yahoos nor Houhynymns.

There were other satirists who worked in a less virulent way. Jonathan Swift's satires obliterated hope in any specific institution or method of human improvement, but some satirists instead took a bemused pose and only made lighthearted fun. Tom Brown, Ned Ward, and Tom D'Urfey were all satirists in prose whose works appeared in the early part of the Augustan age. Tom Brown's most famous work in this vein was Amusements Serious and Comical, Calculated for the Meridian of London (1700). For poetry, Brown was important for his translation of Scarron's Le Virgile travesti, as well as the scandalous Roman satirist Petronius (CBEL). Ned Ward's most memorable work was The London Spy (1704–1706). The London Spy, before The Spectator, took up the position of an observer and uncomprehendingly reporting back. Thereby, Ward records and satirizes the vanity and exaggerated spectacle of London life in a lively prose style. Ward is also important for his history of secret clubs of the Augustan age. These included The Secret History of the Calves-Head Club, Complt.{SIC} or, The Republican Unmask'd (1706), which sought humorously to expose the silly exploits of radicals. Ward also translated The Life &Adventures of Don Quixote de la Mancha, translated into Hudibrastic Verse in 1711, where the Hudibrastic, which had been born in Samuel Butler's imitation of Cervantes, now became the fit medium for a translation of the original (CBEL). Tom D'Urfey's Wit and Mirth: or Pills to Purge Melancholy (1719 for last authorial revision) was another satire that attempted to offer entertainment, rather than a specific bit of political action. D'Urfey (or "Durfey" as he was born) was a stutterer whose clownishness and willingness to be the butt of a joke so long as a joke was told made him a favorite of the nobility and court, and his career straddles the Restoration and Augustan period. Pills to Purge Melancholy is a collection of witty and bawdy songs, mainly drinking songs, with popular favorites such as "The Famous Fart." Although Pope satirized Durfey, he also wrote, in a letter in 1710, that Durfey had a power that he himself did not, for, years after the publication of Pills to Purge Melancholy, Durfey's songs were still on the lips of thousands, while no other poet had such popularity or persistence. Indeed, ten of Durfey's tunes were used in John Gay's Beggar's Opera, five years after Durfey's death.

However, particularly after Swift's success, parodic satire had an attraction for authors throughout the 18th century. A variety of factors created a rise in political writing and political satire (see above for some), and Robert Walpole's success and domination of Commons was a very effective proximal cause for polarized literature and thereby the rise of parodic satire. For one thing, the parodic structure allowed an author to indict another without directly mentioning a name. For another thing, such a satire allowed the author to criticize without offering up a corrective. Swift, for example, does not directly tell his readers what is of value. Instead, like Hume later, he criticizes the gullibility, naivety, and simplicity of others. The parodic satire takes apart the cases and plans of policy without necessarily contrasting a normative or positive set of values. Therefore, it was an ideal method of attack for ironists and conservatives—those who would not be able to enunciate a set of values to change toward but could condemn present changes as ill-considered.

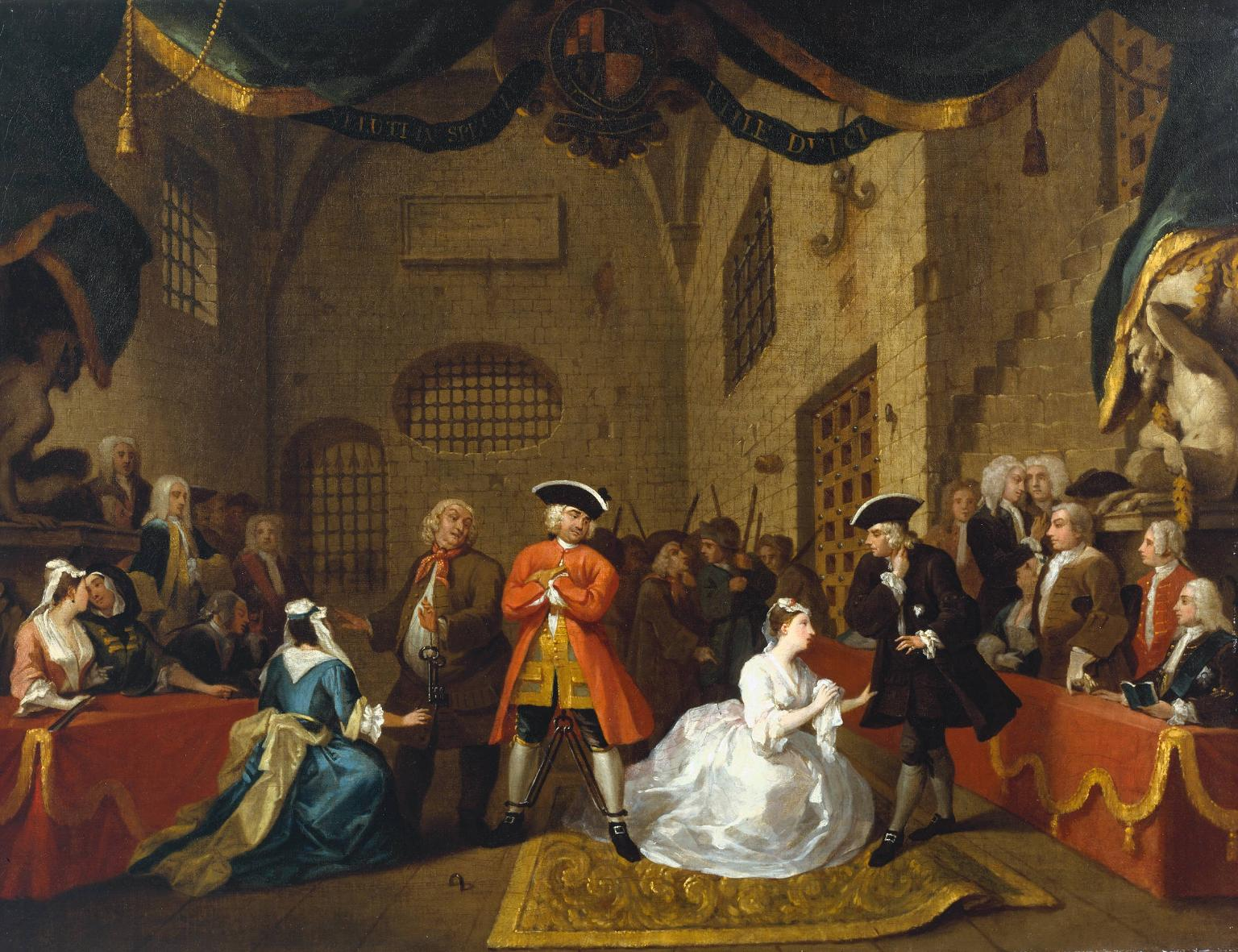
A painting by William Hogarth of a scene from John Gay's Beggar's Opera.

Swift was a friend of Alexander Pope, Robert Harley, John Gay, John Arbuthnot, Thomas Parnell, and Henry St. John. These men together formed the "Scribbleran Club," and they had as their common goal a satire of the "abuses of learning" of all sorts. Pope, Gay, Arbuthnot, and Swift wrote a series of Miscellanies, all mislabeled (the "third part" was the first, the "first part" was the second). In them were several satirical pieces, including Pope's Peri Bathos (see Bathos), 1727, a satire of manuals of the sublime and a manual of how to write bad poetry. Pope picked verses from his contemporaries, and especially his longtime rival, Ambrose Philips, and collated them into a full schematic of how to make bad verse, how to sink in poetry. The Scribbleran Club also produced the Memoirs of Martinus Scribblerus, which is a mock-biography of a man who has learned all the worst lessons of classicism. Martinus Scribblerus is a Don Quixote figure, a man so deeply read in Latin and Greek poetry that he insists on living his life according to that literature. The resulting work is not quite a novel, as it is a sustained prose work that only serves satire.

Satire was present in all genres during the Augustan period. In poetry, all of the literary members of the Scribblerus Club produced verse satires. Gay's Trivia (1716) and many poems by Pope were satires first and foremost. John Arbuthnot's John Bull's Law Case was a prose satire that was extremely popular and generated the term "John Bull" for Englishmen. Further, satire was present in drama. Many plays had satirical scenes or characters, but some plays, like Gay's Beggar's Opera, were parodic satires early in the period (1728), and others, like Henry Fielding's Tragedy of Tragedies (1731) were in the next generation. Additionally and perhaps primarily, satire was a part of political and religious debate. Every significant politician and political act had satires to attack it. Few of these were parodic satires, but parodic satires, too, emerged in political and religious debate.

So omnipresent and powerful was satire in the Augustan age that more than one literary history has referred to it as the "Age of satire" in literature.

== See also ==
- English literature
- Augustan literature
  - Augustan poetry
  - Augustan drama
- Restoration prose
