= Soup and bouilli =

English dish

Soup and Bouilli in England is a dish of boiled beef and root vegetables based on the traditional French dish pot-au-feu. The name comes from the general method in France of serving pot-au-feu as two courses—la soupe et le bouilli. In England as in France, bouilli referred to the boiled meat.

== History ==
Early references to Soup and Bouilli in English are from books by Tobias Smollett. In The Adventures of Roderick Random published in 1748, a meal in Rheims, France, is described as "some soup and bouillé, a couple of pullets roasted, and a dish of asparagus", and in The Adventures of Ferdinand, Count Fathom, at Hotwells Spa, "a mess of broth" made with mutton chops is referred to as "soup and bouilli".

In 1778 in The Camp (play), by Richard Sheridan, a waiter at an Inn in Maidstone, Kent, proposes "soup and bouilli" as an entree.

A recipe for Soup and Boullie was included in The Ladys Assistant by Charlotte Mason in 1773, with the spelling changed to Soup and Bouillie in later editions, and another dish called Bouillie Beef was in The Experienced English Housekeeper by Elizabeth Raffald in 1778. In both recipes the soup and the meat were served as separate dishes.

These recipes were soon copied into other books. With acknowledgements to Mason and Farrald, Mary Cole's The Lady's Complete Guide of 1788 includes both recipes and Bouillie Beef appears in John Farley's, "The London Art of Cookery" from 1783 and Soup and Bouillie is in the 1789 and later editions. The Cook's Oracle by William Kitchiner contained versions of both dishes.

The dish would remain on the menu throughout the 19th century. Alexis Soyer in 1846 extolled its excellence and George Augustus Sala would write in 1856 in a fictional piece that it was at a restaurant in Paris, in the soup and bully, the Bourgeoise Bouillon Boeuf, that he found "true beef".

== Soup and Bully ==
Naming her recipe 'Soup and Boullie', Charlotte Mason in 1773 was possibly reflecting the pronunciation of 'bouilli' in England at the time.

Still earlier in 1753 'bully' was being used especially by those who were ignorant of French manners and customs and disparaged the dish as overcooked and tasteless. In that year in an article by Arthur Murphy (writer), George Briton, a condescending Englishman in Paris, wrote "I could by no means live upon their soup and bully", and in "The Adventures of Ferdinand Count Fathom", Sir Stentor Stile, a rich buffoon knight abroad in Paris, complained that he "could get no eatables upon the ruoad, but what they called bully, which looks like the flesh of Pharaoh's lean kine [cattle]." Although Briton and Stiles were being held up to ridicule, this view was supported in 1825 by French gastronome Jean Anthelme Brillat-Savarin who wrote that "le bouilli est de la chair moins son jus [...] et a disparu dans les dîners véritablement soignés" ("Boulli is flesh minus its juice [...] and has disappeared from truly fashionable dinners").

In 1838 Dudley Costello's coach driver, on an excursion to Antwerp and being served bouilli, noted that "bully means beef with the strength b'iled out on it", and in 1870 a London newspaper, in an article comparing the consumption of meat in England and France, could still write "the poorest Englishman esteems 'bully beef' as being fit only for the pigs".

The dish had its supporters in England, though in some circles to call it "bully beef" was a "barbarism", and in 1829 Sydney, Lady Morgan would write of her shame and horror when, entertaining "English epicures", an old friend also at the table called bouilli "bully beef".

== Preserved Soup and Bouilli ==
The commercial canning of food began in England in 1812. The company was Donkin, Hall and Gamble, and amongst their first products were canisters of Soup and Bouilli.

By 1813 they were supplying the Royal Navy, and in 1814 Vice Admiral Sir Alexander Cochrane recommended that "the Patent Prepared Meats and Soups......., especially the Soup and Bouilli :.....be sent out here [Bermuda] for the sick on board ships of the squadron", beginning the practice of serving soup and bouilli to the sick and convalescent.

Over the next century preserved Soup and Bouilli in tin canisters would be produced by many manufacturers and become a staple on long sea voyages for crews and passengers. In 1910 it was still the "most used soup".

== Scale of Medicines ==
From 1835, merchant ships sailing from the United Kingdom were required to keep on board a supply of medicines, and from 1845 these were itemised in a schedule, The Scale of Medicines. This became The Scale of Medicines and Medical Stores in the Merchant Shipping Act 1867, and from 1 January 1868 Preserved Soup and Bouilli was included, even though Thomas Spencer Wells had noted in the 1861 edition that "the soup and bouilli for the emigrant ships ... is the very worst kind of provisions that could be selected, as ... the captain does not know how much meat he is supplying to his men or passengers".

There also had been an earlier proposal by Christopher Biden in 1849 to add to the Merchant Shipping Act a requirement for ships to carry a Scale of Provisions which included Soup and Bouilli.

== Soap and Bullion ==
As noted above it was not only the amount of ingredients that could vary but also the quality, as revealed in 1852 in the Goldners Meats scandal, which resulted in some seamen retaining "an invincible prejudice against preserved meats" from the time when "much of the meat was no better than carrion or the vilest offal".

On long sea voyages passengers, too, developed an antipathy to the dish. It was seen as one of the "ills appertaining to cheap voyaging" and was pitched overboard from the sailing vessel Norman Morison going from London to Vancouver in 1849–50. In theatres and music halls in Australia in 1860, the mention of Soup and Bouilli would raise a laugh from what would have been a mainly immigrant audience. It would still amuse one old colonist in 1912.

William Clark Russell, who spent many years in the merchant navy, wrote of its 'disgusting flavour', and that "canned meat or tins of soup and bouilli ... purchased in the cheapest markets may produce distempers more terrible than the scurvy they are supposed to combat". It was the "most disgusting of the provisions served out to the merchant sailor" and referred to by sailors as soap and bullion.

== Soup and Bouilli Tins ==
Once emptied, the tin canisters that were used to preserve Soup and Bouilli and other provisions still had a value. In 1828 "70 Empty preserved meat canisters" were advertised for sale. On one emigrant ship a tinman was "kept quite busy making into useful cases our empty soup and bouilli cans". They had a practical value as cooking pots, paint pots, eating bowls, drinking cups, to bail leaky boats, as a pot for plants, etc., and by the 1850s, 'soup and bouilli tin' or 'bouilli tin' had entered the lexicon as a generic term for these used containers, especially with sailors, ships' passengers and emigrants, who had spent time at sea where soup and bouilli was familiar fare, some examples being:

- On an arctic expedition in search of Sir John Franklin, a bouilli tin was used to make a spirit lamp.
- "Neptune's crown", in a crossing-the-line ritual, was a notched soup and bouilli tin decorated with flags, stars, and mermaids.
- Henry Morton Stanley reported to the Royal Geographical Society that at Suna [Tanzania] he offered the 'gentlemen' there empty soup and bouilli tins, amongst other worthless items, as tokens of friendship.
- A soup and bouilli tin became a drum in a makeshift orchestra of kitchen utensils.
- A soup and bouilli tin was proposed for a coat of arms for patrons of soup kitchens, with the motto That's the ticket for soup.
- A collection was taken up in a soup and bouilli tin.

Soup and bouilli tin was also employed figuratively. When used metaphorically it alluded to a rough and ready or no-frills construction or operation.

- A boat is launched by pitching it overboard like an empty bouilli tin.

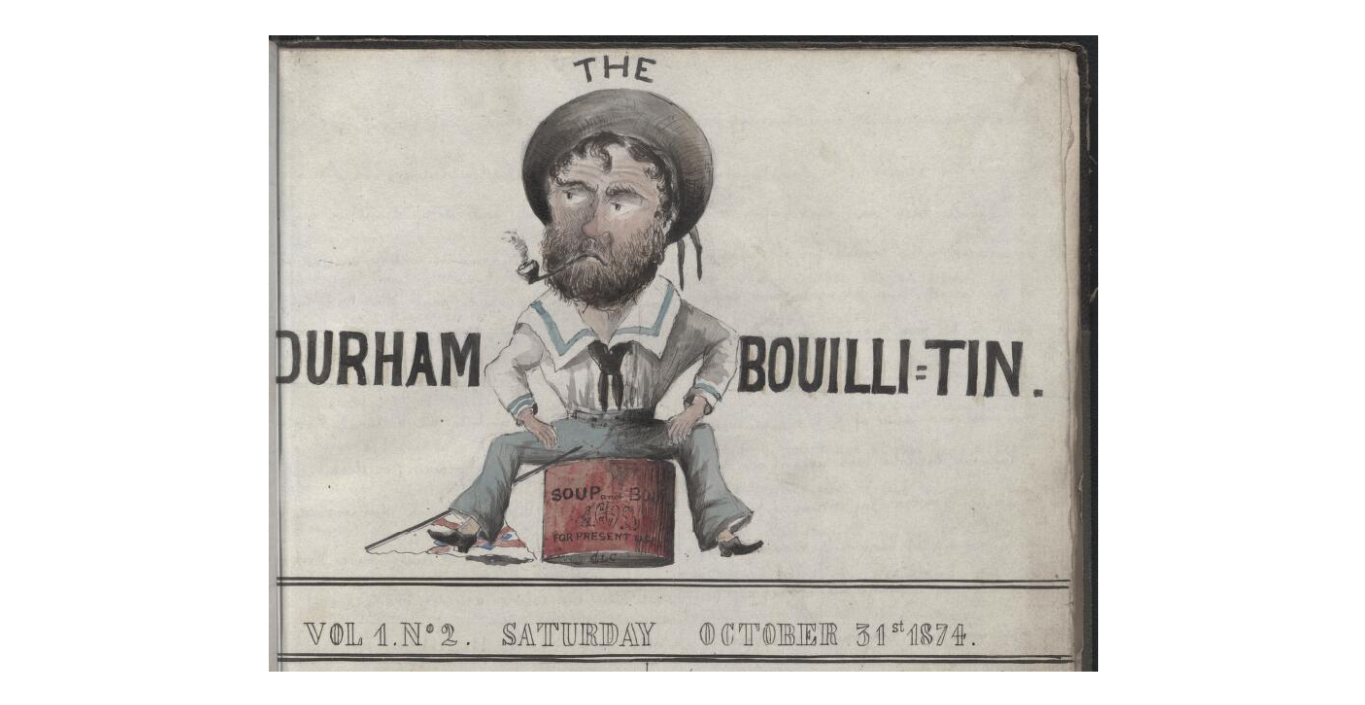
Illustration from Durham Bouilli-Tin

- A boat is as (water)tight as a soup and bouilli tin.
- A life-buoy rescue signal, in size and shape is "not unlike a 8lb soup and bouilli tin (so familiar to all immigrants)".
- A ship repairer "has a soup-and-bouilli-can arrangement on the dock side" as a workshop.
- The description of a rival invention as a "soup and bouilli-tin gasometer and condenser".
- As a vessel for "savoury" news and a pun on "bulletin" The Durham Bouilli-Tin was a shipboard newspaper.

The expression was used by poets and novelists - possibly to add or support a maritime association.

- John Masefield's Dauber "mixed red lead in many a bouilli tin".
- Rolf Boldrewood's island trader stores his money "in a large soup and bouilli tin in his [sea]chest."
- Catherine Helen Spence marked the position of a waterhole in the Australian outback with an old soup-and-bouilli-tin, the contents possibly consumed on the Katherine Stewart Forbes (1818 ship).
