= Novel of circulation =

Type of narrative work centered around an object's use over time

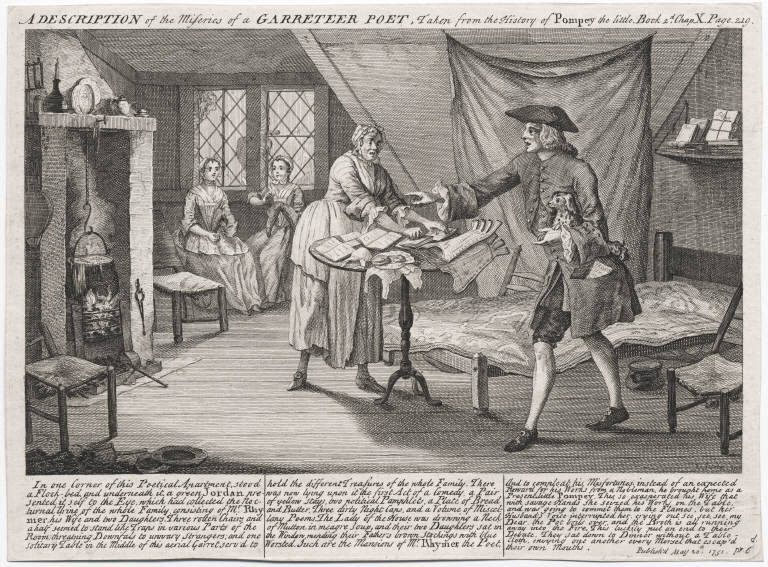
Illustration to Pompey the Little, by John June

The novel of circulation, otherwise known as the it-narrative, or object narrative, is a genre of novel common at one time in British literature, and follows the fortunes of an object, for example a coin, that is passed around between different owners. Sometimes, instead, it involves a pet or other domestic animal, as for example in Francis Coventry's The History of Pompey the Little (1751). This and other such works blended satire with the interest for contemporary readers of a roman à clef. They also use objects such as hackney-carriages and bank-notes to interrogate what it meant to live in an increasingly mobile society, and to consider the effect of circulation on human relations.

== Examples ==
- 1709 Charles Gildon, The Golden Spy has been regarded by modern scholars as "the first, fully-fledged it-narrative in English". But for his contemporaries, it tends to be read as "a Menippean satire, a re-adaptation of Apuleius's The Golden Ass and a sequel to The New Metamorphosis [i.e. Gildon's adaptation of The Golden Ass in 1708]". Later, an episodic structure in which objects "spied" on people became established. Other generic terms used are "object tales" or "spy novels".
- 1710. Joseph Addison Adventures of a Shilling
- 1734 Anonymous, The Secret History of an Old Shoe
- 1742 Claude Crébillon, The Sopha, a Moral Tale
- 1751 Francis Coventry The History of Pompey the Little
- 1753 Susan Smythies, The Stage-coach: containing the character of Mr. Manly, and the history of his fellow-travellers
- 1754 Anonymous, History and Adventures of a Lady's Slippers and Shoes
- 1760 Edward Phillips, The Adventures of a Black Coat
- 1760–5 Charles Johnstone, Chrysal; or, The Adventures of a Golden Guinea
- 1767 Charles Perronet, Dialogue between the Pulpit and Reading-Desk
- 1769 Tobias Smollett, The History and Adventures of an Atom
- 1771 Thomas Bridges, The Adventures of a Bank-Note
- 1783 Theophilus Johnson, Phantoms: or, The Adventures of a Gold-Headed Cane
- 1790 Helenus Scott, The Adventures of a Rupee
- 1799 Edward Augustus Kendall, The Crested Wren
- 1813 Mary Pilkington, The Sorrows of Caesar, or, The Adventures of a Foundling Dog
- 1816 Mary Mister, The Adventures of a Doll
- 1873 Annie Carey, The History of a Book
- 1880 Nellie Hellis, The Story He was told; or, The Adventures of a Teacup
- 1897, John William Fortescue, The Story of a Red Deer

Twentieth-century examples include Ilya Ehrenburg's The Life of the Automobile (1929), Holling C. Holling's Paddle-to-the-sea (1941), and E. Annie Proulx's Accordion Crimes (1996), and Flat Stanley.

== Relationship to other genres ==
With works of Mary Ann Kilner of the 1780s, Adventures of a Pincushion and Memoirs of a Peg-Top, it-novels became part of children's literature. One offshoot was a style of satirical children's verse made popular by Catherine Ann Dorset, based on a poem by William Roscoe, The Butterfly's Ball and The Grasshopper's Feast. Quite generally, it-narrative in the 19th century is typified by an animal narrator.

It has been remarked that the slave narrative genre of the 18th century avoided being confused with the it-narrative, being thought of as a type of biography.

The plot of Middlemarch has been seen to be structured, initially, by a circulation; but to end in a contrasting "subject narrative".

Alberto Toscano and Jeff Kinkle have argued that one popular form of hyperlink cinema, a genre of film characterized by intersecting and multilinear plots, constitutes a contemporary form of it-narrative. In these films, they argue, "the narrative link is the characters' relation to the film's product of choice, whether it be guns, cocaine, oil, or Nile perch."
