= Susan Smythies =

British writer (1720 - 1799 or before)

- Born: 13 January 1720; Colchester, Essex, England
- Died: < 1799
- Occupation: writer
- Writing career
- Genre: novel
- Notable work: The Stage-coach ...

Susan Smythies (born 13 January 1720) was a British story writer from Colchester in Essex.

== Life ==
Smythies was born in Colchester in 1720. Her parents were Susan Puglet and Palmer Smythies.

In 1753 Smythies published The Stage-coach ... which was an early novel of circulation as it has as its subject not a person but an object. In this case it is the stage coach. The book contains the story of Mr. Manly and the other stage coach passengers. The book was repackaged as a two book story for its second edition and as a Three-volume novel for its third edition in 1789. One biographer sees her trying to be a female Samuel Richardson, whilst another sees the book as establishing a new approach between the first person narration of Richardson's work and the third person view of Henry Fielding.

Smythies next work was The History of Lucy Wellers, Written by a Lady was published in 1754 and it concerns the story of Lucy of unknown parentage. She resists the attentions of one man and ends up happily married to a landowner.

Her most well known story "The Brothers" was nearly not published as several had refused it. Smythies consulted Samuel Richardson and he advised her to ignore the publishers. He told her to gather a list of subscribers and in this she was very successful. The publication of "The Brothers" includes the names of the subscribers over 26 pages. Richardson not only subscribed but he added the names too of his children. Notables other names on the list include William Franklin of Pennsylvania, Tobias Smollett, Garrick and Dodsley. The novel was published in 1758 and 35 of the subscribers were from Colchester.

She was unusual in writing and being a woman. The lists of books published by women is quite modest and it could be that some of Smythies works have been assigned to her pen even though the evidence is not definitive.

The details of her later life are not known, although The history of a pin, as related by itself "By the author of ‘The Brothers’" was published as a children's story in 1798 and 1799. This publication could be after her death but it is not clear. One source is certain that she was alive in 1774 when her father died and dead by 1798 when her children's story was published.
