= The History of a Book =

1873 novel

The History of a Book is an 1873 novel by Annie Carey. The novel is an it-narrative following the experiences of a copy of The Life and Adventures of Robinson Crusoe. It was received favorably by the British literary press.

== Background and publication ==
The History of a Book was written by Annie Carey and published in 1873 by Cassell, Petter & Galpin in London. Carey was an author of the it-narrative, a genre of Victorian literature giving the stories of objects; she earlier wrote Autobiography of a Lump of Coal; A Grain of Salt; A Drop of Water; A Bit of Old Iron; and A Piece of Old Flint (1870).

Carey's novel follows a copy of The Life and Adventures of Robinson Crusoe as it is being made. The New Book is left at an auction house, and the other books fail to respect him; once they learn that the New Book is Robinson Crusoe, they respect him and label him "Defoe Senior". In Carey's time, Robinson Crusoe was a mass market book, and her book compares mass literary production to classic literature.

== Reception ==
Writers for the Examiner praised the book, saying it was "attractive and instructive" in discussing the physical assembly of books and for its narrative technique. An article in Graphic recommended the novel for readers interested in the history of publishing and praised its historical view of the printing press "from the rude types of Gutenberg ... to the Walter or Marinoni machines". A review in the Sheffield Daily Telegraph recommended it for the "intelligent child" because the book satisfies "curiosity about one of the most lasting of pleasures – books".
