= Helenus Scott =

Scottish physician

Helenus Scott M.D. (1760–1821) was a Scottish medical doctor.

== Career ==
He was born at Auchterhouse, the son of the local minister. He attended Dundee Grammar School, after which he studied science at Marischal College, Aberdeen from 1773 to 1777, and then studied medicine at the University of Edinburgh until 1779. He entered the medical service of the East India Company, and served chiefly in the Bombay presidency.

Scott became a correspondent of Sir Joseph Banks in London. At the beginning of 1790 he responded to a request from Banks on the cotton industry with an extensive report. Later that year he sent Banks samples of wootz steel. He played a part in the founding of the botanical gardens in Bombay in 1791.

Scott worked also as an agent for the local manufacture of gunpowder in Bombay, and spirits, from 1796. On 24 July 1797 he was created M.D. by the University of Aberdeen. In 1802 he carried out the first successful vaccination in Bombay.

After thirty years in India, Scott returned to England, and began practice at Bath, Somerset. On 22 December 1815 he was admitted a licentiate of the Royal College of Physicians, and in 1817 began to practise as a physician in Russell Square, London. He attained to considerable practice, and died on 16 November 1821. He was then at sea, on HMS Britomart, voyaging with two of his sons to Australia.

== Medical publications ==
In 1817 he contributed a paper to the Transactions of the Medico-Chirurgical Society on the use of nitromuriatic acid in medicine. Its frequent employment in the treatment of enteric fever and other maladies originated in his advocacy.

== Novels ==
Scott published a novel of circulation, The Adventures of a Rupee, in 1781. Another novel was Helena, or the Vicissitudes of Military Life (1790).

== Family ==
Scott married Augusta Maria, daughter of Colonel Charles Frederick. Their sons included Robert, Helenus, and Alexander Walker Scott. One of the stained glass windows in the Garrison Church, Sydney, was installed in memory of Helenus and Augusta.

== Notes ==
Attribution

This article incorporates text from a publication now in the public domain: Lee, Sidney, ed. (1897). "Scott, Helenus". Dictionary of National Biography. Vol. 51. London: Smith, Elder & Co.
