= Francis Coventry =

English cleric and novelist

Francis Coventry (/ˈkɒvəntri/; 1725–1759) was an English Anglican cleric and novelist, best known for The History of Pompey the Little.

== Life ==
A native of Cambridgeshire, he was educated at Magdalene College, Cambridge, where he acquired a B.A. in 1748 and M.A. in 1752. He was appointed by his kinsman the Earl of Coventry to the perpetual curacy of Edgware, and died of smallpox at Whitchurch.

== Works ==
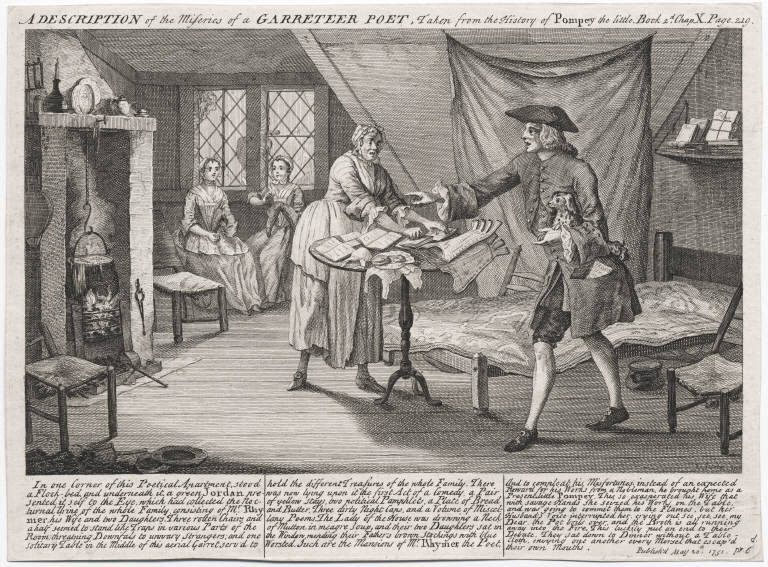
Illustration to Pompey the Little, by John June

Coventry was the author of:

- Penshurst, a poem, inscribed to William Perry, esq., and the Hon. Mrs. Elizabeth Perry, 1750, reprinted in vol. iv. of Dodsley's Miscellanies;
- the fifteenth number of the World, 12 April 1753, containing Strictures on the Absurd Novelties introduced in Gardening;
- the satirical romance and roman à clef, Pompey the Little, or the Adventures of a Lapdog, 1751 (5th ed. 1773), which Lady Mary Wortley Montagu preferred to Peregrine Pickle. Several characters in were intended for ladies well known in contemporary society.

== Notes ==
Attribution

- This article incorporates text from a publication now in the public domain: Stephen, Leslie, ed. (1887). "Coventry, Francis". Dictionary of National Biography. Vol. 12. London: Smith, Elder & Co.
