= The History and Adventures of an Atom =

1769 book by Tobias Smollett

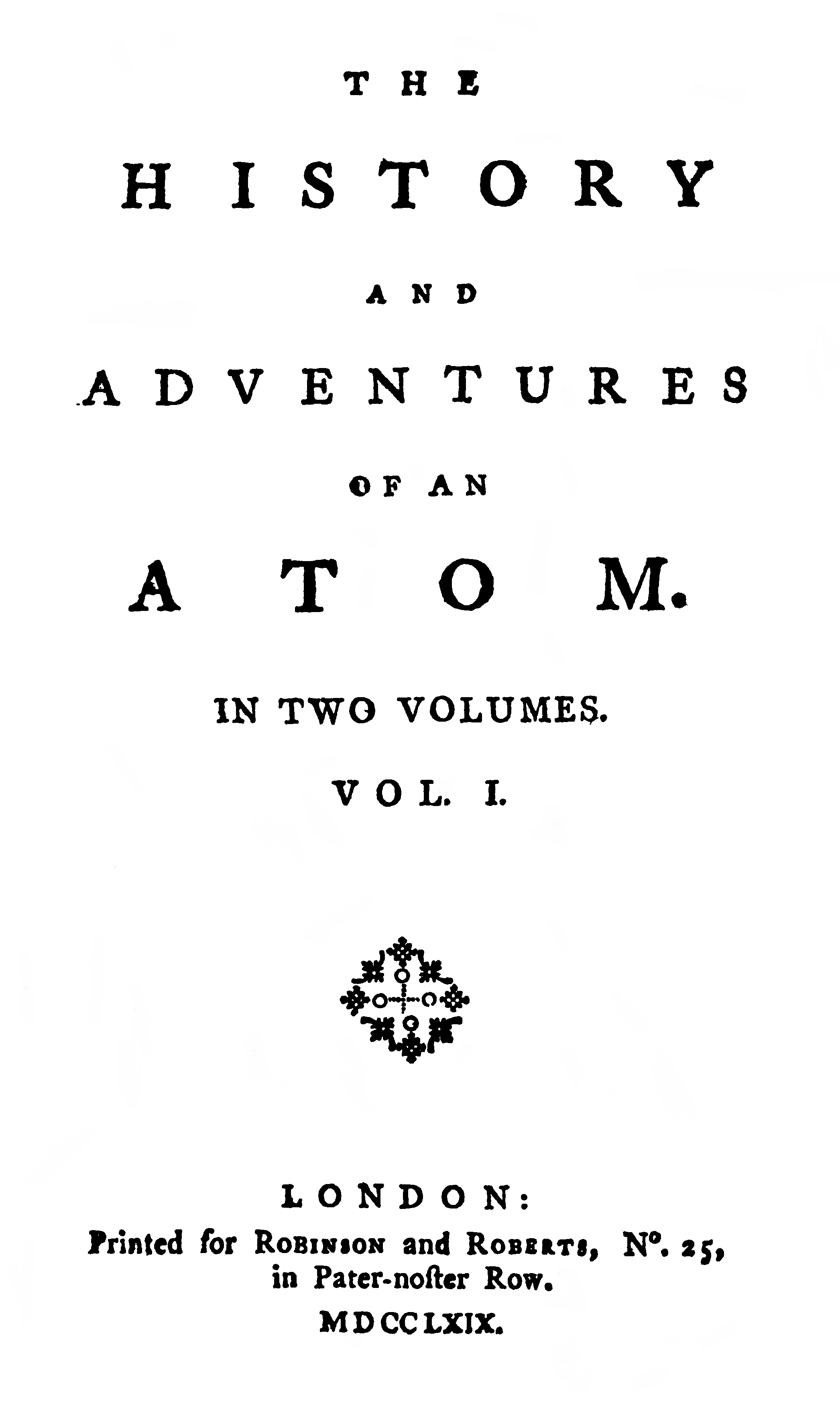
- Title page of the first edition
- Author: Tobias Smollett
- Language: English
- Subject: Satire
- Genre: Novel of circulation
- Set in: Ancient Japan
- Publisher: Robinson and Roberts
- Publication date: 1 April 1769
- Publication place: London, England, United Kingdom
- Media type: Hardcover
- Pages: 227 (volume I); 190 (volume II)
- OCLC: 863330385

The History and Adventures of an Atom is a novel by Tobias Smollett, first published in 1769. The novel satirises English politics during the Seven Years' War.

== Summary ==
This novel of circulation (it-narrative) is narrated by an atom in the body of a London haberdasher, who is the purported editor of the novel. The atom describes events it witnessed in ancient Japan, which are in fact allegories for British politics at the time of the novel's composition.

William Pitt, 1st Earl of Chatham appears as Taycho, and other politicians, monarchs and nations under a light disguise of made-up names. It includes some comments on the Kingdom of Great Britain's growing problems with its American colonies.

Many "keys" have been published to decode which characters are meant to represent real people.

== Publication history ==
The book was published anonymously on April Fools' Day in 1769. From its first publication, it was widely understood to be by Smollett. Smollett's authorship of the book has been debated, but it is generally included and discussed among his works.

The first scholarly edition of the book was published in 1988, edited by Robert Adams Day and O.M. Brack, Jr.

== Reception ==
Writing in 1821, Sir Walter Scott wrote, "The chief purpose of the work (besides that of giving the author the opportunity to raise his hand, like that of Ishmael, against every man) is to inspire a national horror of continental connexions."
