= The Life and Adventures of Sir Launcelot Greaves =

1760 novel by Tobias Smollett

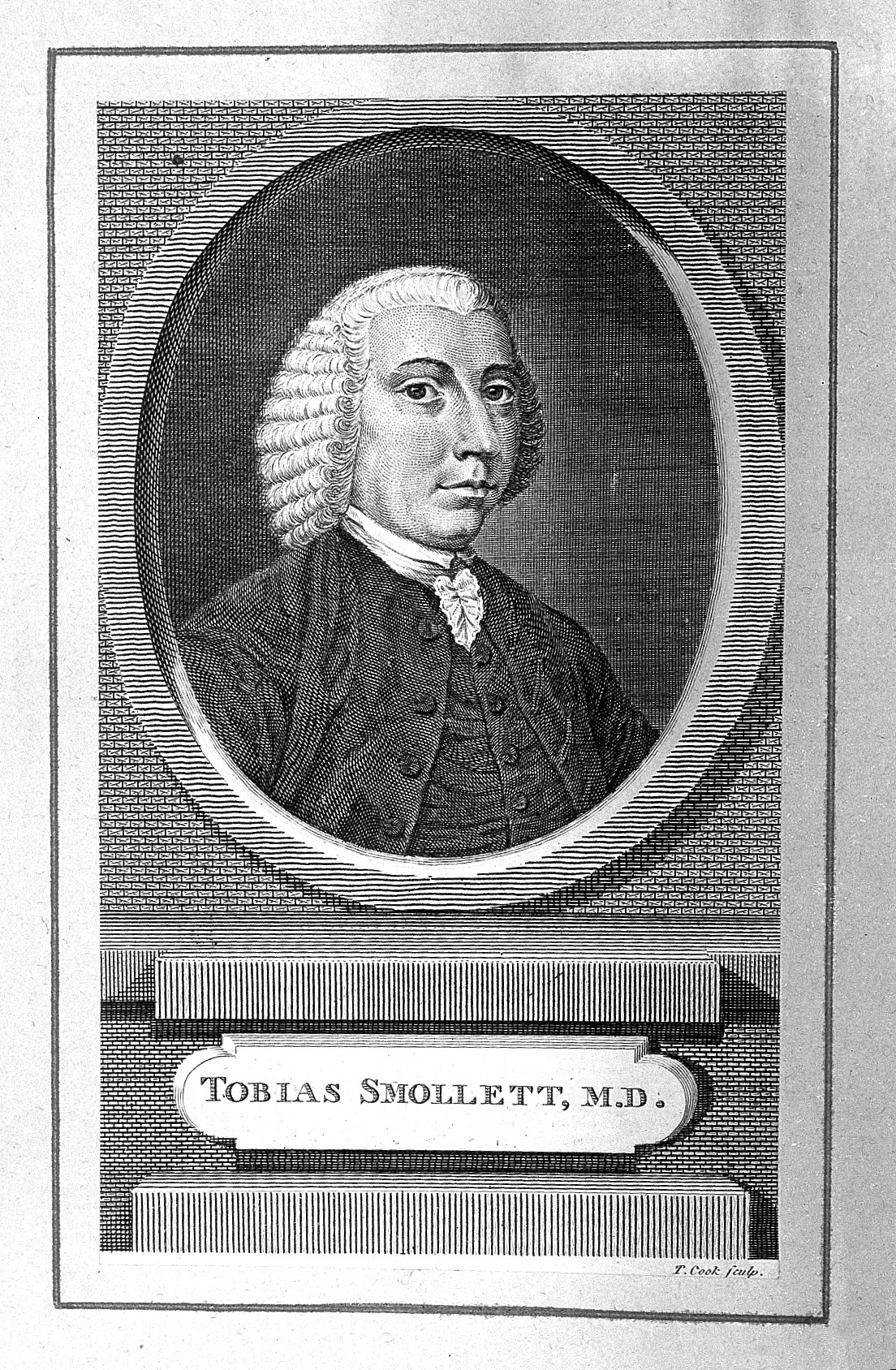
Tobias Smollett, the novel's author

The Life and Adventures of Sir Launcelot Greaves, the fourth novel by Tobias Smollett, was published in 1760. The novel, Smollett's shortest, was published in serial style, starting with the first issue of the monthly paper The British Magazine, in January 1760, and ending with the magazine's December 1761 issue. The first bound book edition was published in 1762.

== Description ==
Sir Launcelot is virtuous and strange, and he is surrounded by a Smollettian menagerie whose various jargons are part of this novel's linguistic virtuosity and satire. He is an eighteenth-century gentleman who rides about the country in armour, attended by his comic squire, Timothy Crabshaw, redressing grievances. These characters are inspired by Miguel de Cervantes's Don Quixote and Sancho Panza, though Smollett's novel has been compared unfavorably with Cervantes'.
