= The Adventures of Peregrine Pickle =

1751 picaresque novel by Tobias Smollett

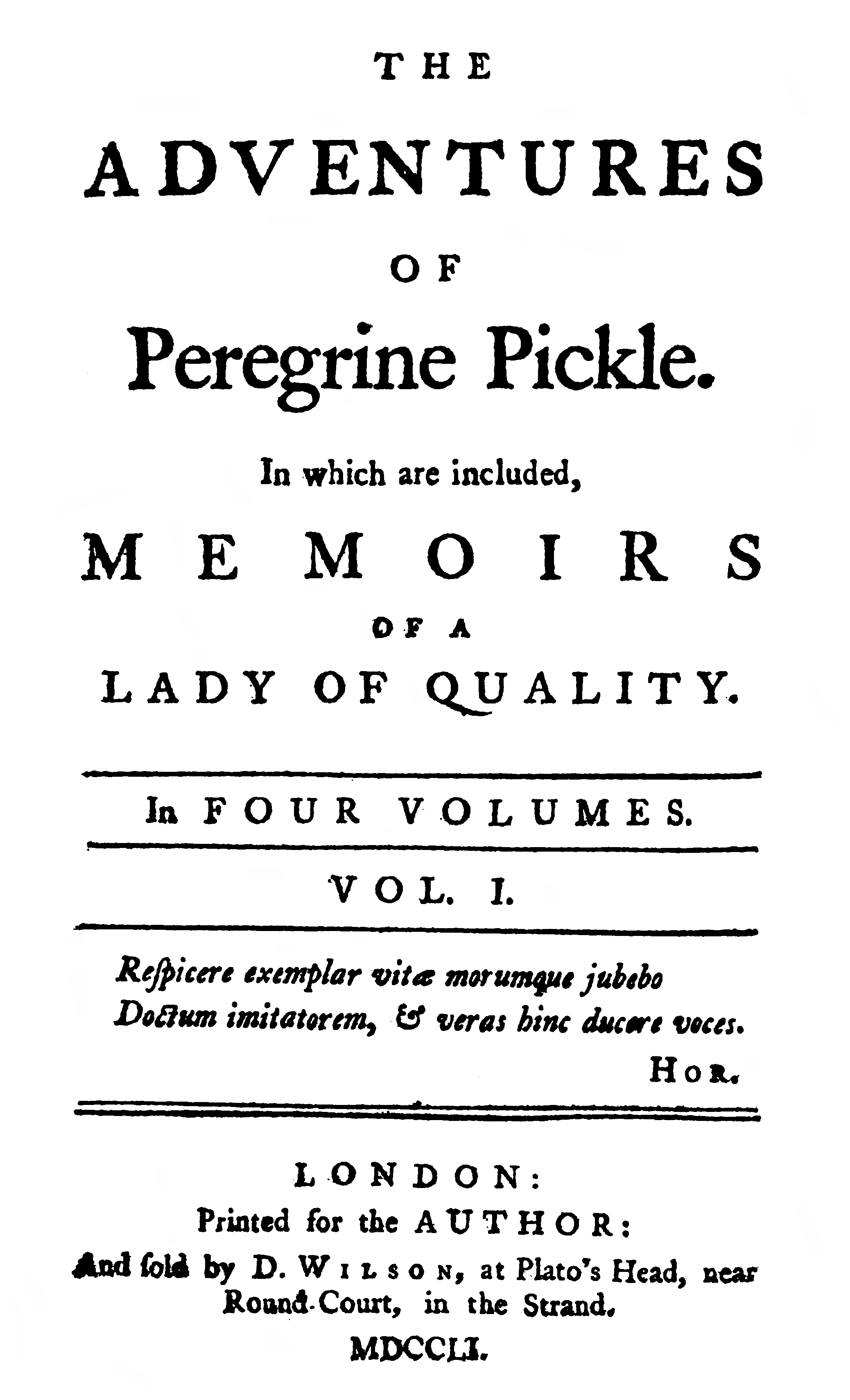
- First edition title page
- Author: Tobias Smollett
- Language: English
- Genre: Picaresque novel
- Publication date: 1751; 1758 (revised reissue)
- Publication place: Great Britain
- Media type: Print
- Pages: 372

The Adventures of Peregrine Pickle is a picaresque novel by the Scottish author Tobias Smollett, first published in 1751 and revised and published again in 1758. It tells the story of an egotistical man who experiences luck and misfortunes in the height of 18th-century European society.

== Plot summary ==
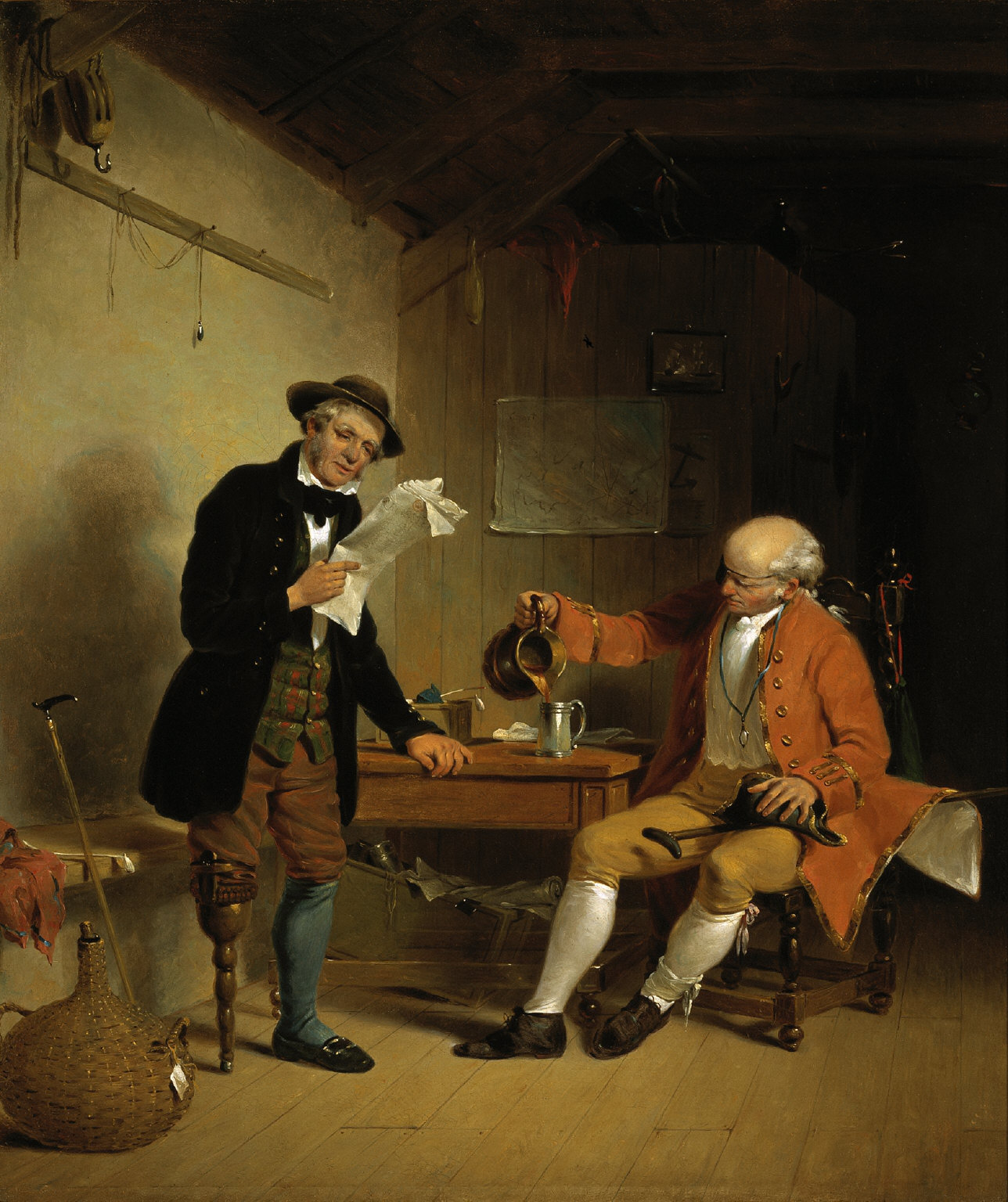
Commodore Trunnion and Jack Hatchway by Francis William Edmonds

The novel begins with the character of Peregrine as a young country gentleman rejected by his cruel mother, ignored by his indifferent father, and hated by his degenerate brother. After their alienation, he turns to Commodore Hawser Trunnion, who raises him.

Peregrine's detailed life experience provides a scope for Smollett's satire on human cruelty, stupidity, and greed: from his upbringing, education at Oxford, journey to France, jailing at the Fleet, and unexpected succession to his father's fortune and his final repentance and marriage to his beloved Emilia. The novel is written as a series of adventures, with every chapter depicting a new experience. The novel also contains a lengthy independent story called "The Memoirs of a Lady of Quality", written by Frances Vane, Viscountess Vane.

Peregrine Pickle features several amusing characters, most notably Commodore Hawser Trunnion, an old seaman and misogynist who lives in a house with his former shipmates. Trunnion's lifestyle may have inspired Charles Dickens to create the character of Wemmick in Great Expectations. Another interesting character is Peregrine's friend Cadwallader Crabtree, an old misanthrope who amuses himself by playing ingenious jokes on naive people.

Smollett also caricatured many of his enemies in the novel, most notably Henry Fielding and the actor David Garrick. Fitzroy Henry Lee was supposedly the model for Hawser Trunnion.

== Criticism ==
George Orwell, writing in the Tribune in 1944, said regarding the novels Roderick Random and Peregrine Pickle:

Peregrine devotes himself for months at a time to the elaborate and horribly cruel practical jokes in which the eighteenth century delighted. When, for instance, an unfortunate English painter is thrown into the Bastille for some trifling offence and is about to be released, Peregrine and his friends, playing on his ignorance of the language, let him think he has been sentenced to be broken on a wheel. A little later they tell him that his punishment has been commuted to castration. Why are these petty rogueries worth reading about? In the first place because they are funny. Secondly, by simply ruling out 'good' motives and showing no respect whatsoever for human dignity, Smollett attains a truthfulness that more serious novelists have missed.

Orwell also noted that: "The central plot of Shaw's play, Pygmalion, is lifted out of Peregrine Pickle, and I believe that no one has ever pointed this out in print, which suggests that few people can have read the book." He apparently referred to chapter 87, which says:

... he moreover observed, that the conversation of those who are dignified with the appellation of polite company, is neither more edifying nor entertaining than that which is met with among the lower classes of mankind; and that the only essential difference, in point of demeanour, is the form of an education, which the meanest capacity can acquire, without much study or application. Possessed of this notion, he determined to take the young mendicant under his own tutorage and instruction. In consequence of which, he hoped he should, in a few weeks, be able to produce her in company, as an accomplished young lady of uncommon wit, and an excellent understanding."

== Legacy ==
The Adventures of Peregrine Pickle is notable for providing the first printed use of the nautical expression "Ahoy!" in the English language (in the form a hoy!)., and for the first printed reference to "Davey Jones."

George P. Upton published the Letters of Peregrine Pickle in the Chicago Tribune from 1866 to 1869 as weekly letters and then in book forms.
