= The Adventures of Roderick Random =

1748 picaresque novel by Tobias Smollett

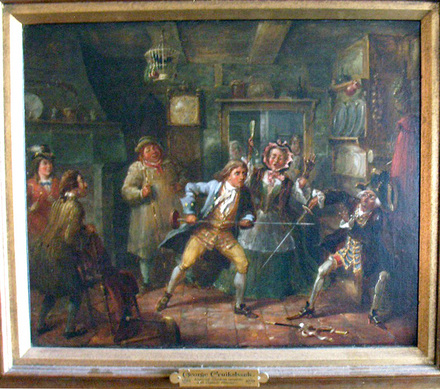
- Author: Tobias Smollett
- Language: English
- Genre: novel
- Publication date: 1748
- Publication place: Great Britain
- Media type: Print

The Adventures of Roderick Random (1748) is a picaresque novel by Scottish author Tobias Smollett, notable for its episodic structure, satirical tone, and realistic portrayal of eighteenth-century British society. It is partially based on Smollett's experience as a naval-surgeon's mate in the Royal Navy, especially during the Battle of Cartagena de Indias in 1741. In the preface, Smollett acknowledges the connections of his novel to the two satirical picaresque works he translated into English: Miguel de Cervantes' Don Quixote (1605–15) and Alain-René Lesage's Gil Blas (1715–47).

== Plot summary ==
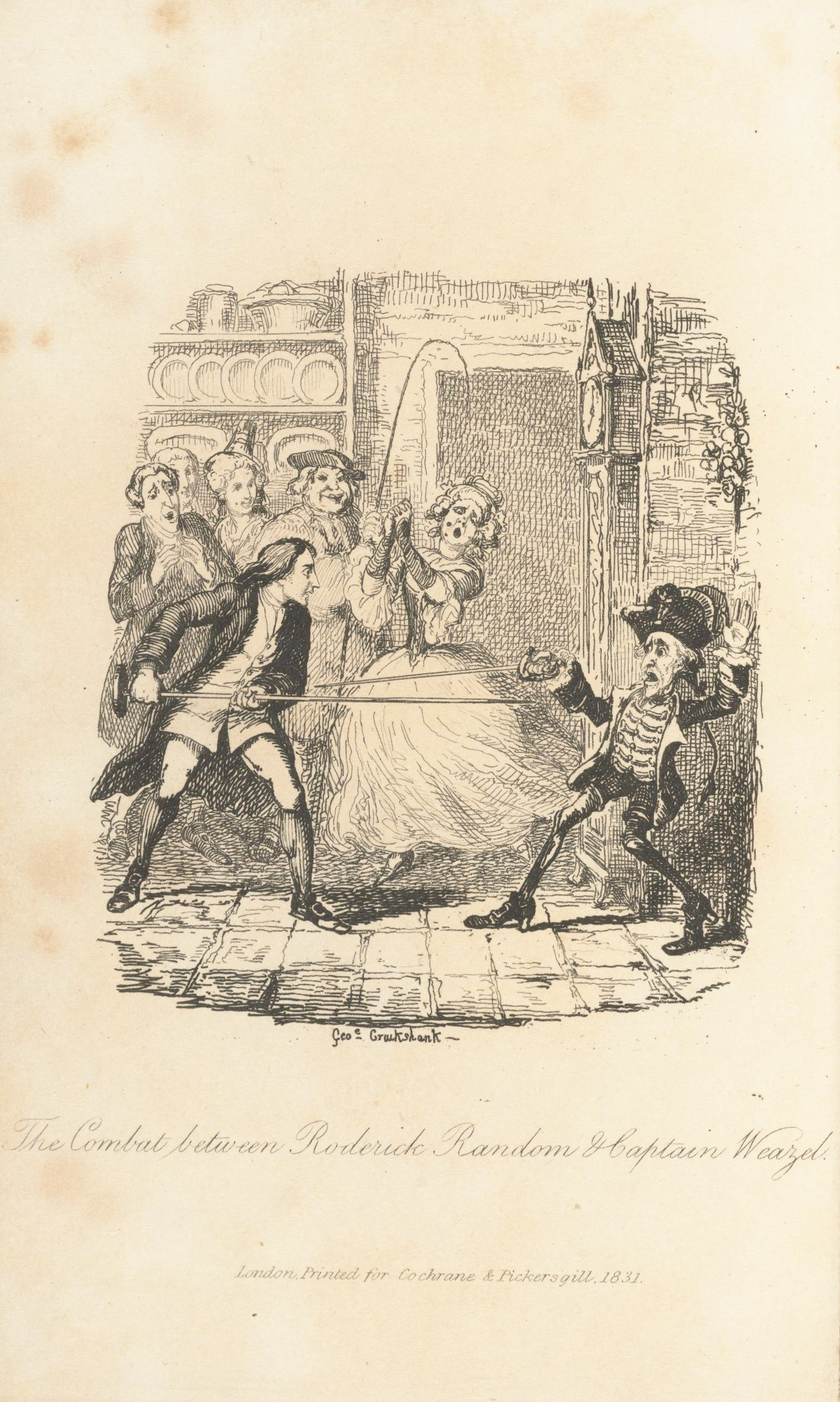
Frontispiece by George Cruikshank for an 1831 edition

The novel is set in the 1730s and 1740s and tells the life story (in the first person) of Roderick "Rory" Random, who was born to a Scottish gentleman and a lower-class woman and is thus shunned by his father's family. His mother dies soon after giving birth and his father is driven mad with grief. Random's paternal grandfather coerces a local school master into providing free education for the boy, who becomes popular with his classmates (some of whom he encounters again in subsequent adventures) and learns Latin, French, Italian and ancient Greek. The language accomplishments are despite, rather than because of, the abusive tutor who oppresses Random at every opportunity. Finally Random is cast out after the tutor exacts revenge for one of Random's escapades and denounces him to his grandfather. With none of his paternal family willing to assist him in any way, Random relies on his wits and the occasional support of his maternal uncle, Tom Bowling.

The naive Random then embarks on a series of adventures and misadventures, visiting among other places, London, Bath, France, the West Indies, West Africa and South America. With little money to support himself, he encounters malice, discrimination and sharpers at every turn. His honest and trustworthy character and medical skills do however win him a few staunch friends. Roderick spends much of the novel trying to attract the attention of various wealthy women he meets, so that he can live comfortably and take up his rightful entitlement as a gentleman. To that end he poses as a nobleman several times, including once while he is in France. Roderick and his companion Hugh Strap end up serving twice on British ships, once on a privateer and once on a warship after being press-ganged. The novel ends happily when Random is reunited with his wealthy father in Argentina. He inherits some funds immediately, enabling him to marry the lovely Narcissa without the consent of her guardian brother.

== Characters ==
Smollett’s characters are drawn from his observation of eighteenth-century naval and medical life. Many embody social types rather than psychological individuals, a common device in picaresque fiction.

Typical of a picaresque novel, there is a wide range of characters but few central ones.

Roderick "Rory" Random

The hero and narrator, son of a Scottish gentleman and a lower-class woman.

Hugh Strap

Hugh Strap, a simple-hearted barber's apprentice and former schoolmate who is Roderick's companion through most of the novel. He adopts the name "Monsieur d'Estrapes" while in France.

Narcissa

A gentlewoman and the object of Random's advances during the second half of the novel. They eventually marry.

Tom Bowling

Random's maternal uncle, he is a sailor who attempts to support Random as best as he can between voyages. His conversation is laced with nautical terminology.

The character of "Captain Whiffle" is said to be modelled on Lord Harry Powlett, who became 6th Duke of Bolton.

Several figures, such as Strap and Captain Whiffle, serve as comic or moral foils, illustrating contrasts between virtue, vanity, and hypocrisy.

== Themes ==
Smollett offers a vicious portrayal of hypocrisy, greed, deceit and the snobbery peculiar to the times, especially among the upper and middle classes. He exposes the brutality, incompetence and injustice of the Royal Navy at the Battle of Cartagena in 1741 and in relation to preferment, promotion and medical treatment. The novel embraces common 18th century topics such as privateering, slavery, prostitution, dowries, homosexuality, debtor's prison (the Marshalsea), political and arts patronage, the clergy, the practice of medicine, and corruption. Smollett experienced many of these first-hand and portrays them with a candid vigour.

Throughout the novel, Random is referred to by the author and others as a "North Briton". The relatively recent Act of Union between England and Scotland in 1707 was still controversial.

== Reception and influence ==
Upon publication in 1748, Roderick Random was a commercial success and helped to popularize the picaresque form in English fiction. Contemporary readers reportedly attributed the work to Henry Fielding, reflecting its popularity and stylistic kinship with Tom Jones. The novel helped define the picaresque mode in English fiction and is regarded as one of its earliest native examples. Smollett’s lively satire and episodic narrative influenced later authors, including Charles Dickens and Mark Twain, who admired and read his works.
