= The Adventures of Ferdinand, Count Fathom =

1753 novel by Tobias Smollett

The Adventures of Ferdinand Count Fathom
- Author: Tobias Smollett
- Language: English
- Genre: novel
- Publication date: 1753
- Publication place: England
- Media type: Print
- Followed by: The Expedition of Humphry Clinker

The Adventures of Ferdinand, Count Fathom is a novel by Tobias Smollett first published in 1753. It was Smollett's third novel and met with less success than his two previous more picaresque tales. The central character is a villainous dandy who cheats, swindles and philanders his way across England and the rest of Europe with little concern for the law or the welfare of others. He is the son of an equally disreputable mother, and Smollett himself comments that "Fathom justifies the proverb, 'What's bred in the bone will never come out of the flesh'." Sir Walter Scott commented that the novel paints a "complete picture of human depravity."

The main character reappears as a minor character in Smollett's later novel The Expedition of Humphry Clinker.

The novel's elements of terror and the supernatural have caused some historians of English literature to describe it as anticipating the themes of the Gothic novel.
