= Tobias Smollett =

Scottish writer and surgeon (1721–1771)

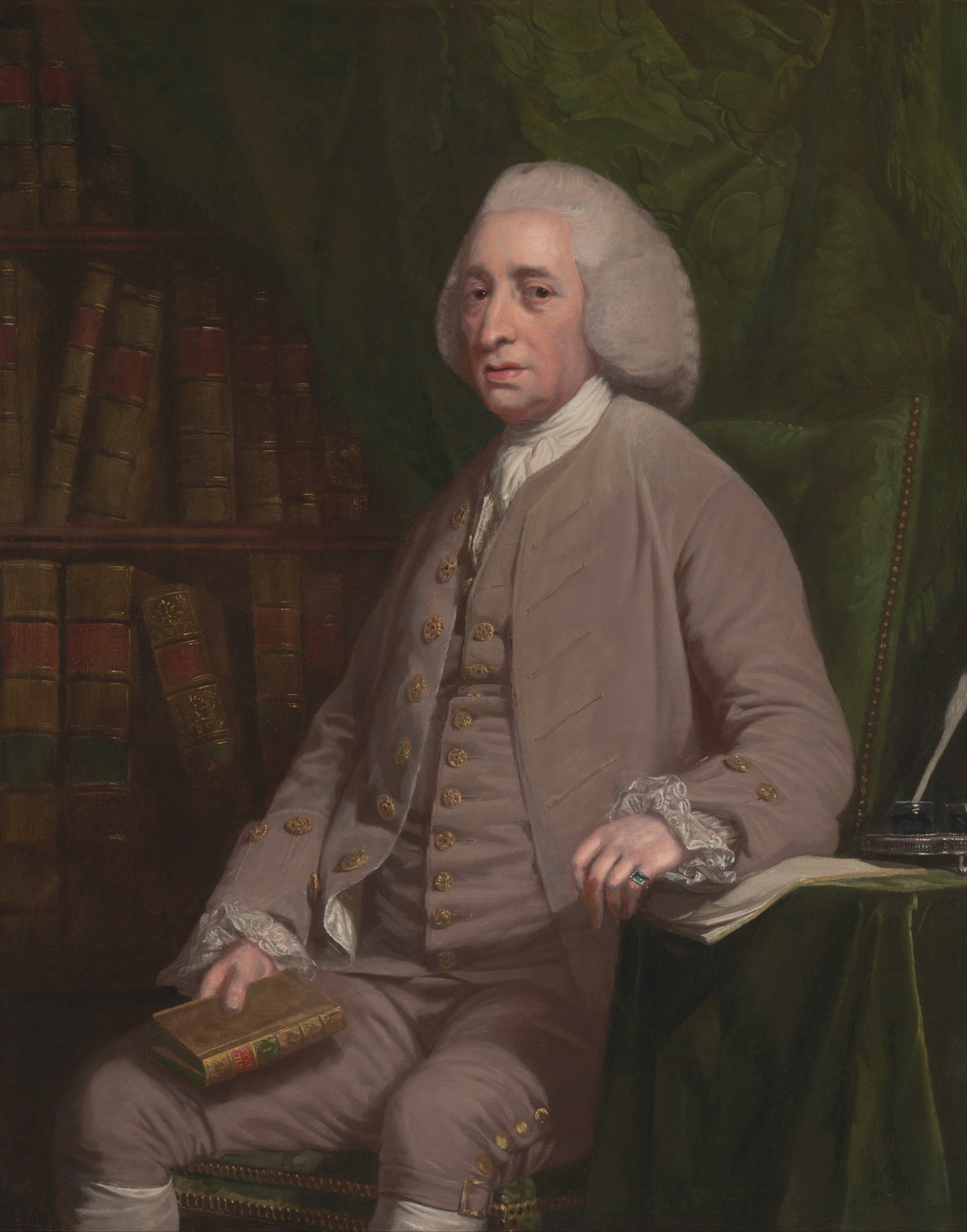
- Portrait by Nathaniel Dance-Holland, c. 1764
- Born: 19 March 1721; Dalquhurn, Scotland
- Died: 17 September 1771 (aged 50); Livorno, Tuscany
- Education: University of Glasgow; University of Edinburgh; University of Aberdeen
- Occupations: Writer, surgeon
- Writing career
- Period: 1748–1771
- Genres: Picaresque, satire

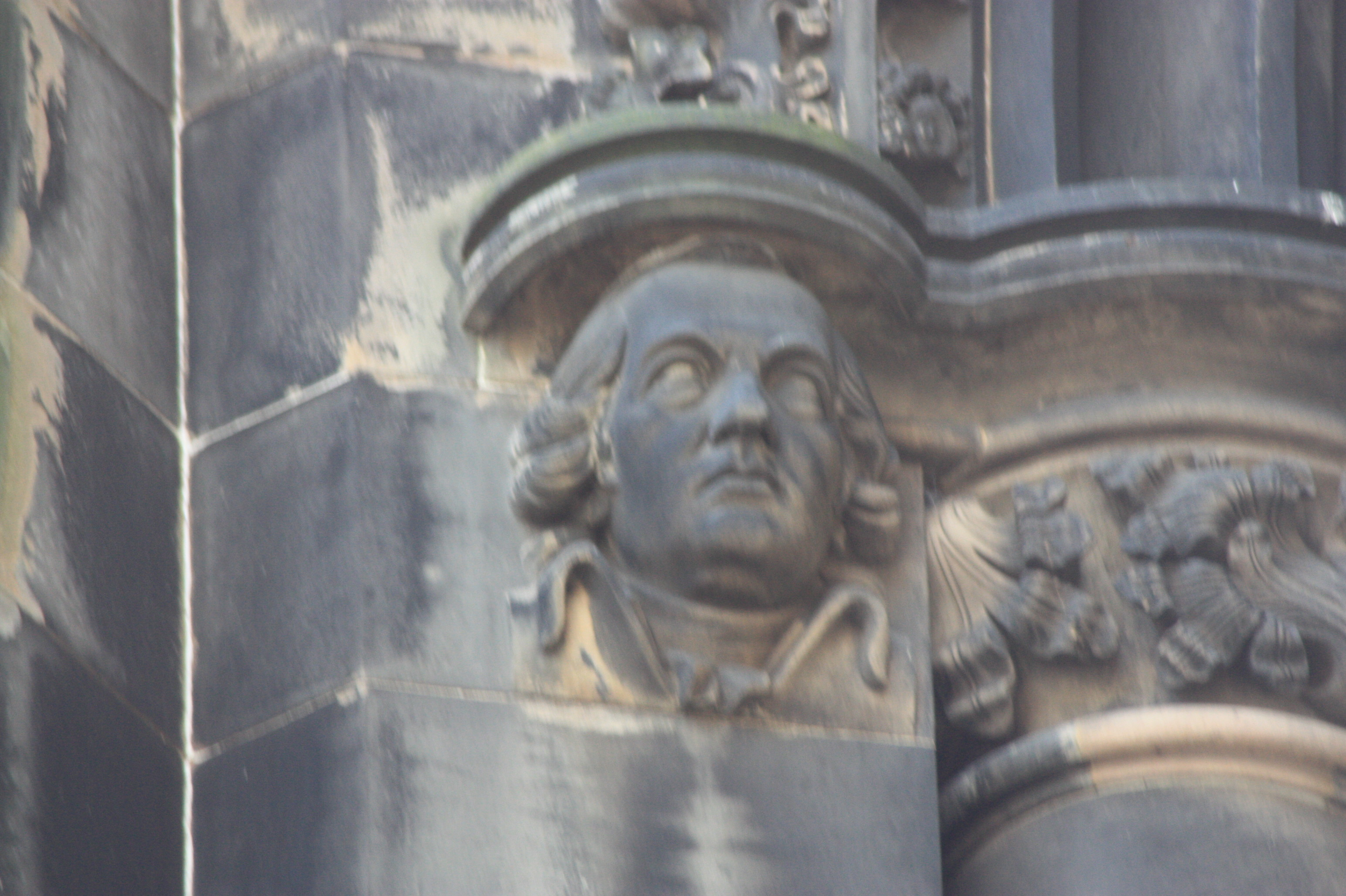
Tobias Smollett as depicted on the Scott Monument

Tobias George Smollett (bapt. 19 March 1721 – 17 September 1771) was a Scottish writer and surgeon. He was best known for writing picaresque novels such as The Adventures of Roderick Random (1748), The Adventures of Peregrine Pickle (1751) and The Expedition of Humphry Clinker (1771), which influenced later generations of British novelists, including Charles Dickens. His novels were liberally altered by contemporary printers; an authoritative edition of each was edited by Dr O. M. Brack Jr and others.

== Early life and family ==
Smollett was born at Dalquhurn, now part of Renton in present-day West Dunbartonshire, Scotland, and baptised on 19 March 1721 (his birth date is estimated as 3 days previously). He was the fourth son of Archibald Smollett of Bonhill, a judge and landowner, laird of Bonhill, living at Dalquhurn on the River Leven, who died about 1726, when Smollett was just five years old. His mother Barbara Smollett née Cunningham brought the family up there, until she died about 1766. He had a brother, Captain James Smollett, and a sister, Jean Smollett, who married Alexander Telfair of Symington, Ayrshire. Jean succeeded to Bonhill after the death of her cousin-german, Sir James Smollett, and resumed her maiden name of Smollett in 1780. They lived in St John Street off the Canongate, and had a son who was in the military.

== Education and career ==
Smollett was educated at Dumbarton Grammar School and the University of Glasgow, where he studied medicine and eventually qualified as a surgeon. Some biographers assert that he then proceeded to the University of Edinburgh, but left without earning a degree. Others state that his career in medicine came second to his literary ambitions at the age of 18, and it was not until 1750 that Smollett was granted his MD degree at the University of Aberdeen.

In 1739 he went to London having written a play The Regicide, about the murder of King James I of Scotland. Unsuccessful at getting this on stage, he obtained a commission as a naval surgeon on HMS Chichester and travelled to Jamaica, where he settled down for several years. In 1742 he served as a surgeon during the disastrous campaign to capture Cartagena. These experiences were later included in the narrative of his novels.

He married a wealthy Jamaican heiress, Anne "Nancy" Lascelles (1721–1791). She was a daughter of William Lascelles, but was unable to access her inheritance as it was invested in land and slaves. On their return to Britain, at the end of his Navy commission, Smollett established a practice in Downing Street but his wife did not join him until 1747; they had a daughter Elizabeth, who died aged 15 years about 1762. His two native languages were English and Scots. He translated famous works of the Enlightenment from other European languages.

== Written works ==
Smollett's first published work in 1746 was a poem about the Battle of Culloden entitled "The Tears of Scotland". However, it was The Adventures of Roderick Random, a semi-autobiographical story of a 'north Britain on the make' which made his name. His poetry was described as "delicate, sweet and murmurs as a stream". The Adventures of Roderick Random was modelled on Le Sage's Gil Blas and despite its scandalous content covering 'snobbery, prostitution, debt and hinting at homosexuality', it was published in 1748. After that, Smollett finally had his tragedy The Regicide published, although it was never performed.

In 1750, he travelled to France, where he obtained material for his second novel, The Adventures of Peregrine Pickle, another success. Having lived for a brief time in Bath, he returned to London and published The Adventures of Ferdinand Count Fathom in 1753, but this did not sell well and he went into debt. His novels were published by the well-known London bookseller Andrew Millar. Smollett became considered as a 'man of letters' and associated with such figures as David Garrick, Laurence Sterne, Oliver Goldsmith, and Samuel Johnson, whom he famously nicknamed "that Great Cham of literature".

In 1755 he published an English translation of Miguel de Cervantes' novel Don Quixote, which he revised in 1761. In 1756, he became briefly editor of the 58-volume Universal History, and editor of The Critical Review, from which later he had a successful libel case brought against him by Admiral Sir Charles Knowles, and a three-month prison sentence, and fine of £100.

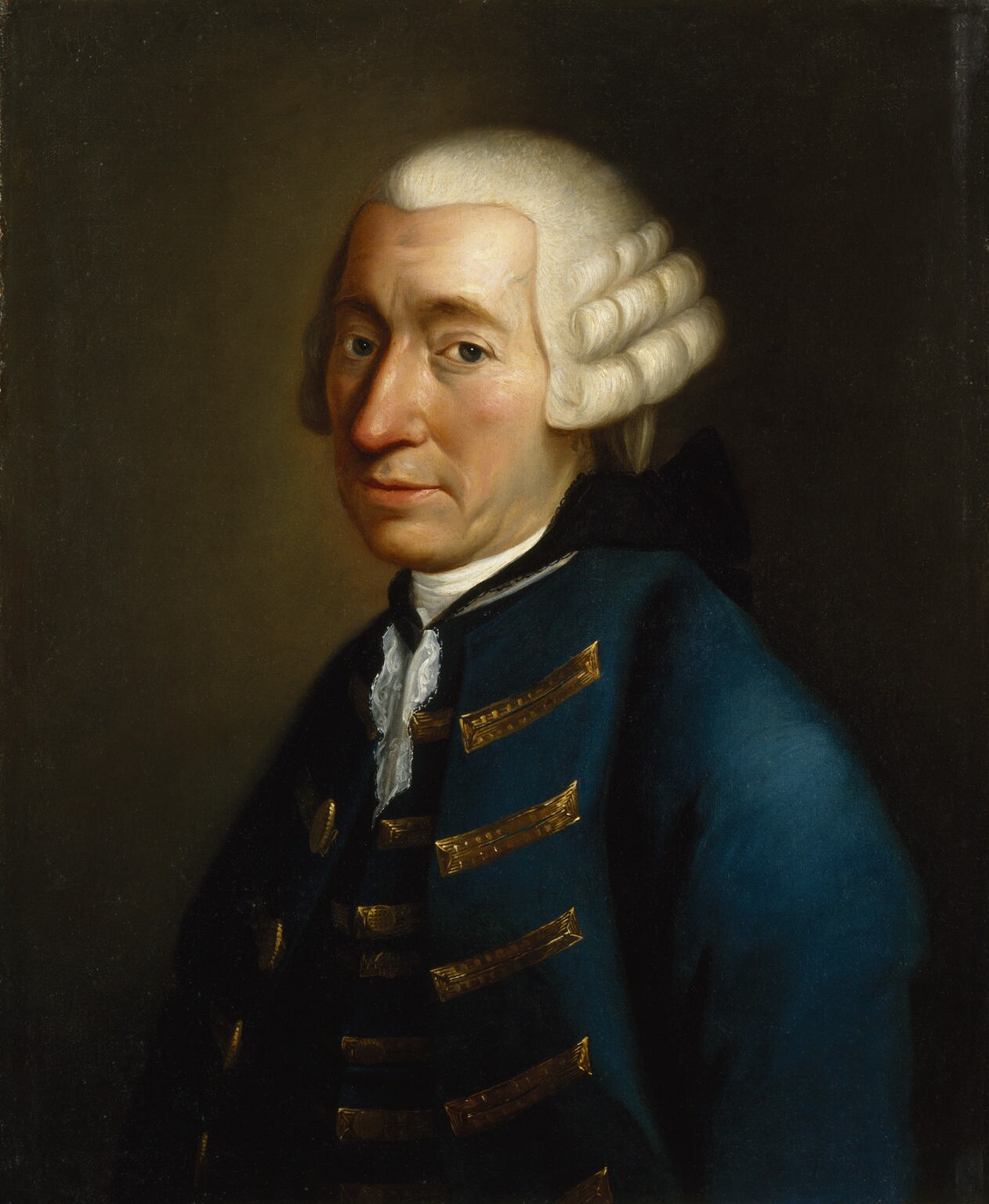
Portrait of Smollett by unknown artist, 1770

Smollett then began what he regarded as his major work, A Complete History of England (1757–1765) which helped recoup his finances, along with profits from his only performed play, a farce, The Reprisal; or the Tars of Old England. After his imprisonment, he used the experience in producing another novel, The Life and Adventures of Sir Launcelot Greaves (1760).

In 1763, Smollett was ill, perhaps with tuberculosis, and suffered the loss of his only child at the age of 15. He gave up his editorships and, with his wife Nancy, relocated to Continental Europe, which led to the publication of Travels Through France and Italy (1766). He also published The History and Adventures of an Atom (1769), which gave his opinion of British politics during the Seven Years' War in the guise of a tale from ancient Japan. In 1768, the year he moved to Italy, Smollett entrusted Robert Cunninghame Graham of Gartmore with selling off the slaves he still owned in Jamaica.

A further visit to Scotland helped to inspire his last novel, The Expedition of Humphry Clinker (1771), published in the year of his death. He had for some time been suffering from an intestinal disorder. Having sought a cure at Bath, he retired to Italy, where he died in September 1771 and was buried in the Old English Cemetery, Livorno.

== Monuments ==
There is a monument to his memory beside Renton Primary School, Dunbartonshire, Scotland, on which there is a Latin inscription. The area around the monument was improved in 2002, with an explanatory plaque. After his death in Italy in 1771, his cousin Jane Smollett had the Renton monument built in 1774. It comprises a tall Tuscan column topped by an urn. On the plinth is a Latin inscription written by Professor George Stuart of Edinburgh, John Ramsay of Ochtertyre and Dr Samuel Johnson. It is a category A listed building.

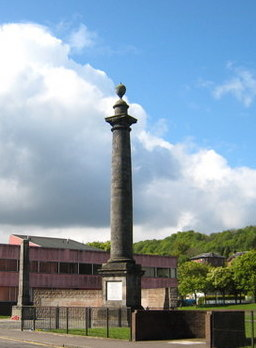
Tobias Smollett Monument in Renton, West Dunbartonshire

There is also a plaque at his temporary residence in Edinburgh, just off the Royal Mile at the head of St John's Street, where his wife lived after his death until at least 1785. This states that he resided there in the house of his sister, Mrs. Telfer, for the summer of 1766. A second plaque (dating the building at 1758, making it relatively new at that time) states that he "stayed here occasionally," implying more than one visit.

Smollett is one of the 16 Scottish writers and poets depicted on the lower section of the Scott Monument in Princes Street, Edinburgh. He appears on the far left side of the east face. There are streets named after him in Nice, France and in Livorno, Italy, where he is buried.

== References in literature ==
Laurence Sterne, in his A Sentimental Journey Through France and Italy, refers to Smollett under the nickname of Smelfungus, due to the snarling abuse Smollett heaped on the institutions and customs of the countries he visited and described in his Travels Through France and Italy.

Mr Brooke in George Eliot's Middlemarch says to Mr Casaubon: "Or get Dorothea to read you light things, Smollett – Roderick Random, Humphry Clinker. They are a little broad, but she may read anything now she's married, you know. I remember they made me laugh uncommonly – there's a droll bit about a postillion's breeches."

In W. M. Thackeray's novel Vanity Fair, Rebecca Sharp and Miss Rose Crawley read Humphry Clinker: "Once, when Mr. Crawley asked what the young people were reading, the governess replied 'Smollett'. 'Oh, Smollett,' said Mr. Crawley, quite satisfied. 'His history is more dull, but by no means so dangerous as that of Mr. Hume. It is history you are reading?' 'Yes,' said Miss Rose; without, however, adding that it was the history of Mr. Humphry Clinker."

Charles Dickens's David Copperfield mentions that his young protagonist counted Smollett's works among his favourites as a child.

John Bellairs referenced Smollett's works in his Johnny Dixon series, where Professor Roderick Random Childermass reveals that his late father Marcus, an English professor, had named all his sons after characters in Smollett's works: Roderick Random, Peregrine Pickle, Humphry Clinker, and even "Ferdinand Count Fathom", who usually signed his name F. C. F. Childermass.

George Orwell praised him as "Scotland's best novelist".

In Hugh Walpole's fifth novel Fortitude, the protagonist Peter refers to Peregrine Pickle as a text that inspired him to document his own memoirs.

Smollett is referenced in Don Winslow's detective yarn "A Cool Breeze On The Underground,"

== Bibliography ==
=== Poetry ===
- 1746: Advice
- 1747: Reproof: A satire, a sequel to Advice

==== Minor poems ====
- "The Tears of Scotland"
- "The Verses on a young lady playing on a harpsichord and singing"
- "Love Elegy"

==== Odes ====
- "Burlesque"
- "Mirth"
- "Sleep"
- "Leven Water"
- "Blue-Eyed Ann"
- "Independence"

=== Translations ===
==== Spanish ====
- 1755: The History and Adventures of the Renowned Don Quixote, translated from the original Spanish of Miguel de Cervantes. Vol. 1:. Vol. 2:. - considered to be a revision of the translation by Charles Jervas

==== French ====
- 1776 (posthumously published) The Adventures of Telemachus, the Son of Ulysses - a translation of Les Aventures de Télémaque (1699) by François Fénelon
- 1748: The Adventures of Gil Blas of Santillane, published anonymously (dated, incorrectly, "1749"), translated from the original L'Histoire de Gil Blas de Santillane by Alain-René Le Sage
- 1749: The Devil upon Crutches by Alain-René Le Sage - revised the same year.

==== Editor ====
- 1761–1765: The Works of Voltaire, English translation of Voltaire in 35 volumes, which Smollett edited with Thomas Francklin.

=== Novels ===
- 1748: The Adventures of Roderick Random, published anonymously (revised 1748,1749, and 1755)
- 1751: The Adventures of Peregrine Pickle, published anonymously (revised 1758, 1765, and 1769)
- 1753: The Adventures of Ferdinand Count Fathom
- 1762: The Life and Adventures of Sir Launcelot Greaves, first book edition, originally serialised in The British Magazine, January 1760 – December 1761 (see below)
- 1769: The History and Adventures of an Atom
- 1771: The Expedition of Humphry Clinker

=== Plays ===
- 1749: The Regicide; or, James the First, of Scotland: A tragedy (play)
- 1757: The Reprisal; or, The Tars of Old England: A comedy, anonymously published; a play performed on 22 January

=== Non-fiction ===
- 1756: A Compendium of Authentic and Entertaining Voyages, published anonymously
- 1757: A Complete History of England, Deduced from the Descent of Julius Cæsar, to the Treaty of Aix la Chapelle, 1748. Containing the Transactions of One Thousand Eight Hundred and Three Years, in four volumes. Smollett followed this with Continuation of the Complete History of England (1760–1765, five volumes).
- 1766: Travels through France and Italy
- 1768–1769: The Present State of all Nations, in eight volumes
- The Narrative of the Base and Inhuman Arts that were Lately Practised upon the Brain of Habbakkuk Hilding
- The Expedition against Carthagena
- The Dying Prediction
- Commentary on a Philosophical Dictionary, ten volumes

=== Periodicals ===
- 1756: Editor and co-writer, The Critical Review; or, Annals of Literature, a periodical published semi-annually until 1790
- Date unknown: Editor, Universal History
- 1760: The British Magazine, a periodical published in eight volumes; Volumes 1 and 2 include the first publication of Launcelot Greaves (see below)

== Radio ==
The Expedition of Humphry Clinker was adapted for radio in three one-hour episodes in August 2008. It was dramatised by Yvonne Antrobus and starred Stuart McLoughlin as Clinker and Nigel Anthony as Matthew Bramble.

== See also ==
- Physician writer
- Old English Cemetery, Livorno
