= Characters in Dombey and Son =

List of characters created by Charles Dickens

Dombey and Son
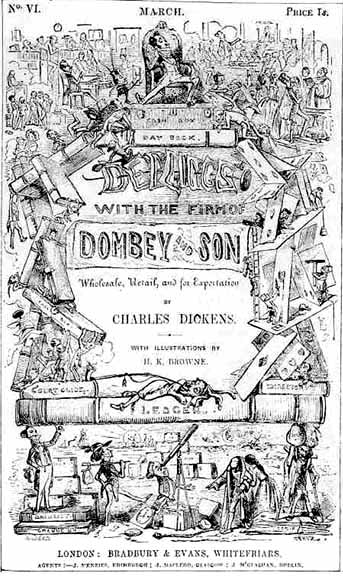
- Coverage of monthly issues
- Author: Charles Dickens
- Language: English
- Genre: Novel
- Publisher: Bradbury and Evans
- Publication date: 1848
- Publication place: England
- ISBN: 1-85326-257-9

Dombey and Son, published by Charles Dickens in 1848, is far from being the most populated of his novels. Moreover, almost all the characters—with the exception of the heroine Florence—appear as "humour characters," in the sense defined by Samuel Johnson: that is, they are characterized by an exaggeration, or even an eccentricity (whether good or bad), which tends to sum up their entire personality. Even Little Paul, the long-awaited male child meant to carry on the powerful firm of "Dombey and Son," becomes odd, is judged old-fashioned and outdated, yet precociously adult—able, before his premature death, to understand the mystery of the waves and, beyond that, of the entire cosmos.

Dickens focuses above all on the relationships between the characters, particularly the strange relationship between the daughter Florence and her father Mr. Dombey, which only begins to change at the end of the novel—after he, until then absent, useless, and cruelly indifferent, finally finds redemption through a kind of reverse initiatory journey marked by defeat, sorrow, and illness. This relationship has raised numerous questions, for which critics have offered, depending on the generation, moralizing, societal, psychoanalytic, or feminist interpretations.

Clearly, Dickens places less emphasis on individualized character development, mainly using two traditional literary devices from the 17th and 18th centuries: satirical irony aimed at the villains, and sentimentality—often verging on melodrama—toward the good characters, who, in the novel's end, gather around a symbolic bottle of old Madeira wine, whose presence or absence punctuates the progression of the narrative.

== Census ==
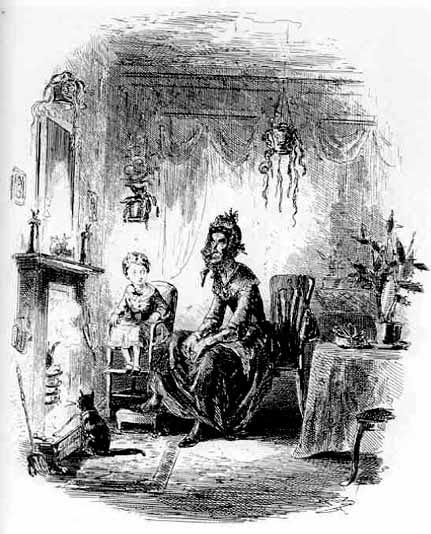
Paul and Mrs Pipchin (ch 8), by Phiz

Almost all the proper names evoke, through their sound, either directly or by allusion, a personality trait. A brief explanation is given for each.

- Mr. Paul Dombey: wealthy owner of a shipping house. The name "Dombey" suggests the adjective dumb, meaning "stupid" in a figurative sense, and also the noun donkey.
- Edith Granger: proud widow, daughter of Mrs. Skewton, who becomes the second Mrs. Dombey. The misfortunes brought on by this marriage draw her closer to Florence, Dombey's neglected daughter.
- Mrs. Fanny Dombey: first wife of Mr. Dombey, mother of Florence and Paul, who dies shortly after giving birth. The name Fanny has a distinctly feminine connotation in British English.
- Master Paul Dombey (Little Paul): Mr. Dombey's son, frail and often ill. Presumptive heir to the "Dombey and Son" firm, he dies at the age of nine after enduring a rigid and imposed education.
- Miss Florence (Floy) Dombey: Mr. Dombey's elder daughter, whom he coldly neglects. The name Florence, as in French, evokes the word "flower."
- Mrs. Louisa Chick: Mr. Dombey's sister.
- Mr. Chick: husband of Mrs. Chick.
- Miss Lucretia Tox: friend of Mrs. Chick, great admirer of Mr. Dombey, and neighbor to Major Joseph Bagstock. Tox recalls "toxin" or drugs, as though this lady were "intoxicated," so obsessed is she with Mr. Dombey.
- James Carker (Mr. Carker the Manager): corrupt manager of the firm "Dombey and Son." Carker evokes canker (a kind of ulcer) and the idea of gnawing worry (cark).
- John Carker (Mr. Carker the Junior): elder brother of James Carker, disgraced and relegated to menial tasks at "Dombey and Son."
- Miss Harriet Carker: sister of the above.
- Mr. Morfin: deputy manager at the Dombey firm. Morfin suggests morphia, or morphine.
- Mr. Perch: office boy at Dombey's. Perch refers both to the fish and to the pole used to reach things. Mr. Perch has a talent for slipping away like one and reaching his goal like the other.
- Solomon (Uncle Sol) Gills: maker of nautical instruments and owner of the shop The Wooden Midshipman. His first name, whose abbreviation suggests "sun," evokes the legendary wisdom of the biblical figure Solomon.
- Walter Gay: nephew of Solomon Gills, friend of Florence, employee of Mr. Dombey, exiled by Carker the Manager. The surname Gay (Note: Gay, in the sense of homosexuality, is a term only dating from the 1960s.) emphasizes his joyful nature, while the very common first name Walter suggests total normality.
- Captain Edward (Ned) Cuttle: retired naval officer, friend of Gills. Cuttle is short for cuttlefish (a squid-like sea creature); the name, just one consonant away, also recalls scuttle ("to scuttle," or deliberately sink something).
- Major Joseph Bagstock (Josh, Joe, J.B., Old Joe): retired army officer, great admirer of Miss Tox and friend of Dombey until the latter's downfall. The name Bagstock evokes a worn-out windbag, full of flashy yet empty speech.
- Briggs: schoolmate of Paul.
- Tozer: schoolmate of Paul.
- Mr. P. Toots: schoolmate of Paul and later a foppish admirer of Florence, he eventually marries Susan Nipper.
- The Game Chicken: pseudonym of a friend of Mr. Toots, fond of fighting and roughhousing. The name evokes the world of professional boxing.
- Miss Susan Nipper: Florence's nurse, whom she loves and defends with unwavering loyalty. She eventually marries Mr. Toots. Her surname evokes her sharp tongue—nipper derives from nip.
- Mrs. Cleopatra Skewton: disabled mother of Edith Granger Dombey and former lover of Bagstock. Her first name hints at her glittering, fading past, while Skewton contains skew. Also, skew is close to skewer, suggesting her withered state.
- Cousin Feenix (Lord Cousin Feenix): cousin of Edith Granger, who takes her in after she flees the Dombey household.
- Mr. Toodle: railway technician, whose name calls to mind a poodle.
- Polly Toodle (Mrs. Richards): Mr. Toodle's wife and Little Paul's wet nurse under the name "Mrs. Richards," imposed by Dombey. Polly, a fairly common name, is also the heroine of the famous nursery rhyme: Polly put the kettle on.
- Robin Toodle (Rob the Grinder, Biler): son of the Toodles, sent to the Charitable Grinders school, later employed by Captain Cuttle and Mr. Carker the Manager. Robin evokes the robin bird; Grinder recalls the destitute children in workhouses who were so hungry they would grind bones to survive; Biler suggests a bilious, irritable person.
- Good Mrs. Brown: old ragpicker who briefly kidnaps Florence and proves to be a key figure in the plot.
- Brown Alice (Alice Marwood): daughter of Good Mrs. Brown and cousin of Edith Granger, former lover of Carker, recently returned from deportation.
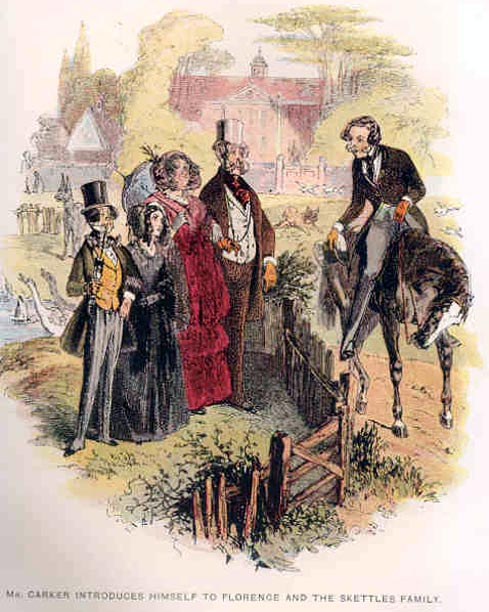
- Mr. Carker introduces himself to Florence and the Skettles family (ch. 24), by Phiz.
  Jack Bunsby: captain of the ship Cautious Clara, a hero to Captain Cuttle, who consults him regularly without ever really understanding what he says. Bunsby eventually marries Mrs. MacStinger. His name contains bun.
- Mrs. MacStinger: Captain Cuttle's landlady, a relentless shrew. Her name evokes stinginess and pettiness.
- Mrs. Pipchin: strict widow and owner of a boarding house in Brighton, where Little Paul is sent for health reasons before being enrolled in Dr. Blimber's academy.
- Master Bitherstone: resident at Mrs. Pipchin's, later a student at Dr. Blimber's academy.
- Miss Pankey: resident at Mrs. Pipchin's.
- Sir Barnet Skettles: father of Master Skettles.
- Lady Skettles: mother of Master Skettles.
- Master Skettles: student in Brighton.
- Doctor Blimber: head of the institution in Brighton where Little Paul is enrolled. The school is a kind of hothouse that forces young plants (students) to grow prematurely.
- Mrs. Blimber: wife of Doctor Blimber.
- Miss Cornelia Blimber: daughter of Doctor Blimber and teacher. The name Cornelia may refer to Shakespeare's King Lear.
- Mr. Feeder: assistant to Doctor Blimber and teacher; his name means "one who feeds"—in this context, one who stuffs students with (pseudo-)intellectual nourishment.
- Diogenes: dog at Dr. Blimber's institution in Brighton, especially loved by Little Paul and adopted by Florence after Paul's death.
- Mr. Brogley: secondhand furniture dealer with a shop in Bishopgate Street; he takes over The Wooden Midshipman when Solomon Gills can no longer pay his debts. However, Sol receives money from Paul Dombey to settle the account, and Walter Gay remains with Brogley after the shipwreck.
- The Native: Indian servant of Major Bagstock.
- Mrs. Wickham: Little Paul's second nurse after Polly Toodle is dismissed.

== Relationships ==
The title of the novel itself reveals the importance given to the relationships among the various characters and, above all, to family ties. While "Dombey and Son" is the name of the company, the presence of the coordinating conjunction links the two characters on a human level. The first chapters correspond to the nine years of Little Paul's life, but his death marks the beginning of another major turning point, summed up in Miss Tox's ironic remark: "Good gracious, good gracious, [...] who would have thought that Dombey and Son would turn out to be Dombey and Daughter after all!" (Note: Curiously, the Wordsworth edition omits this sentence at the end of chapter 16.) The way had already been paved by Walter Gay's toast: "To Dombey and Son — and Daughter!" In truth, the novel does not follow a plot that aligns with its title, for the story is above all that of a one-sided conflict between a father and his daughter—and not only theirs: parent-child relationships, and especially parental absence, form the core of the narrative, its main branch and all its offshoots.

=== Dombey, an enigmatic character ===
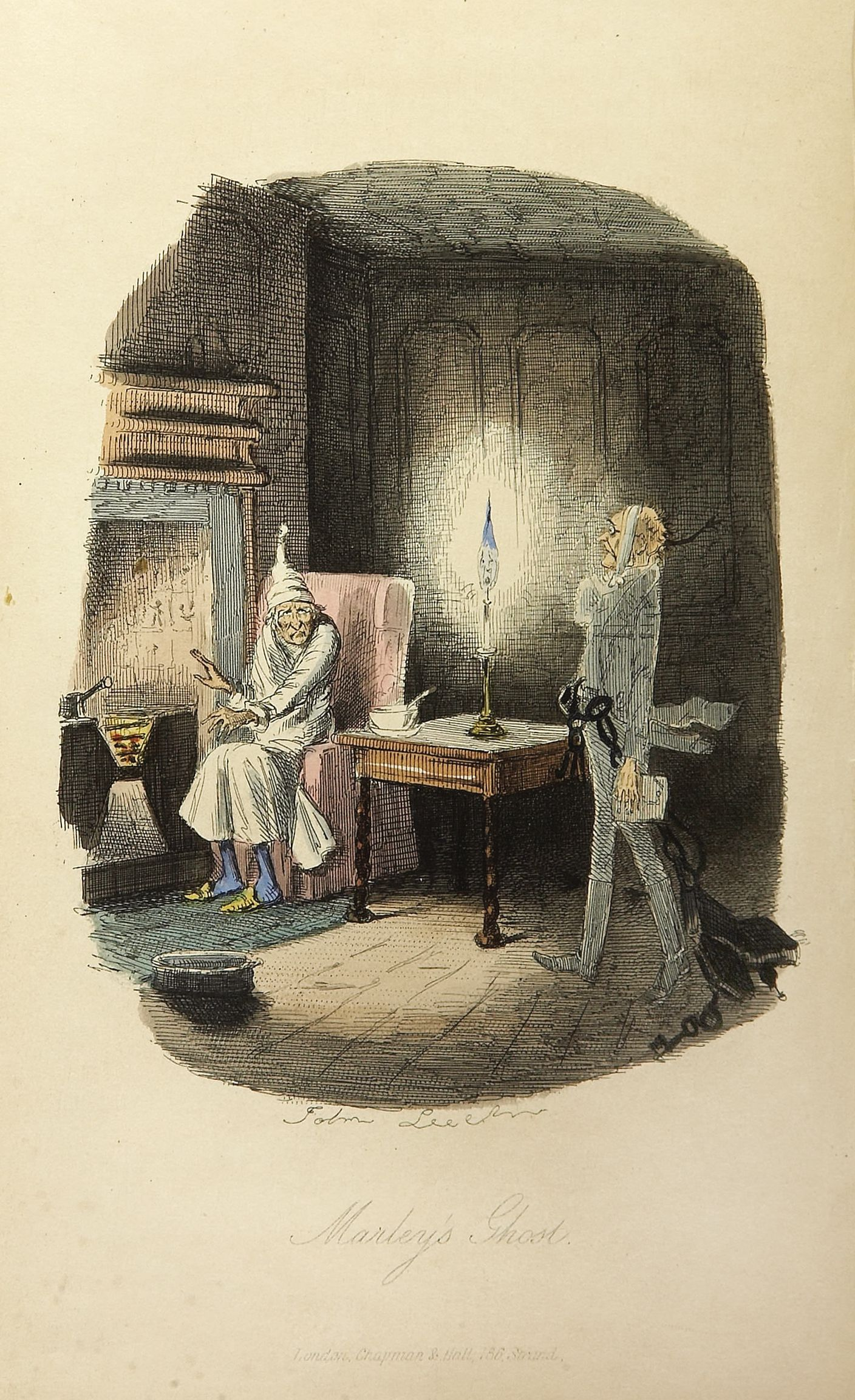
Scrooge and Marley's Ghost by John Leech.

According to Elizabeth Gitter, "[w]ith his comic coldness, Dombey resembles Ebenezer Scrooge, but he is a darker, more enigmatic character, as mysterious and grotesque as the allegorical figures described by Walter Benjamin." She goes on to argue that, unlike Scrooge, however, his emotional frigidity is not rooted in a childhood etiology — his coldness comes to him naturally, in a way. She concludes that his forever gloomy and dry mood stems from a fundamental melancholy that makes him at once cruel, stubborn, solitary, and relentless. Dombey, she continues, "reigns over an England afflicted with the same societal coldness, an almost universal absence of compassion." Thus, "despite his central role in a Victorian novel, he remains essentially a 'pre-bourgeois' emblematic figure, a synecdoche of the desolate world in which he resides." At the end of the novel, she concludes, "in a suicidal vision of his own reflection, he ejects himself from the narrative for the simple reason that Dickens uses him not for a conventional change of heart, but to tear away the mask of the Dombey household — and of the nation as a whole." Françoise Basch adds that "he is not presented as an individual, but as the symbol of his firm and, beyond that, of the entire country."

This is essentially a societal analysis; psychoanalysis offers a more complex interpretation, which many critics have explored. If the relationship between Florence and her father pertains to the Oedipus complex, (Note: The Electra complex, sometimes used for father-daughter relationships, is a theoretical concept by Carl Gustav Jung, who, in 1913, named it in reference to the Greek heroine who avenged her father Agamemnon by murdering her own mother, Clytemnestra. He believed he had created an equivalent to Freud's Oedipus complex, but Freud rejected this proposal: "It seems to us on this point that what we say of the Oedipus complex applies strictly only to the male child, and that we are justified in rejecting the term Electra complex, which insists on the analogy in behavior between the two sexes." For Freud, there is no "Law of the Mother," and the issue cannot be resolved by a simple mythological equivalence.) nothing is stated openly by Dickens — not only because, given the chronology, such an interpretation can only be made in hindsight, but also because he proceeds by a series of allusions that the reader is left to decipher.

=== Dombey, the absent father ===
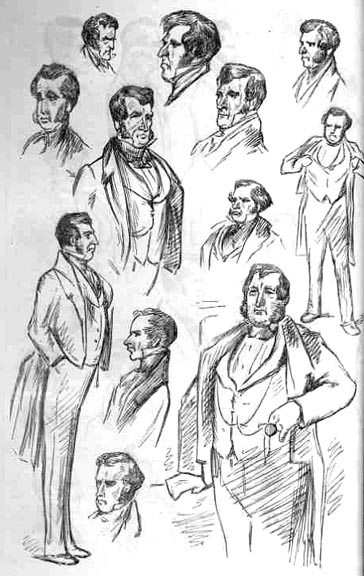
Sketches for Mr. Dombey, by Hablot Knight Browne.

Be that as it may, Dickens — undoubtedly forever wounded by the shortcomings of his father, and populating his works with children deprived of parental affection, orphaned or neglected, even cruelly treated — remains, despite appearances, very ambiguous when describing the ties between Dombey and his daughter Florence, which may at first seem nonexistent. In reality, this very absence, by its omnipresence, haunts the novel's landscape and offers a complexity that the reader discovers quite early, toward the end of the first chapter — just before the death in childbirth of Mrs. Dombey. That this wife and mother dies does not seem to be a tragedy in itself for the master of the house — after all, a good nursemaid will replace her, since her role is implicitly reduced to mere nourishment. The peril, on the other hand, lies in the elder child — this insignificant daughter who, from the start, has at least delayed if not usurped the role intended for the newborn son, as she could never, under any circumstances, have inherited the proud House of Dombey.

Now she finds herself alone with the little brother destined for great things, and despite her young age, she naturally tends — through her initiative and the child's total devotion to her — to compensate for the void left by the mother's death. That she should become, like Esther Summerson in Bleak House, a Little Mother, appears intolerable to the master of the house, who has neither need nor desire — or so he believes — for a substitute mother. Worse still, he sees in this a grave danger, as it would constitute a breach in the exclusive grip he wishes to have over the male child, who, by right, belongs only to him and must not be shared with anyone. The dehumanization he imposes on the hired nurse, Polly Toodle — even stripping her of her name — provides glaring proof of this. In this light, Florence, who already bears several stigmas — that of being female, unloved, an intruder, and useless — becomes a real threat, earning her even more brutal rejection. What Dombey seems to fear most is femininity, from which he intends to shield his heir, surrounding him only with old, dry, quarrelsome women — his own sister, for instance, or in Brighton, the wife and daughter of Mr. Blimber, stern mistresses devoid of tenderness. Only Polly, because of her strong character, gives the child she nourishes a bit of the love he needs — and even then she does so in secret, which costs her her place when her transgression is discovered. Truthfully, Florence only becomes acceptable at the very end of the novel, when her father — now graying — has lost his former grandeur, and she has herself become a wife and a mother, without ever ceasing to be a daughter.

Consequently, long before this resolution, the role of the father is fulfilled by avuncular figures — Solomon Gills for Walter, who has no known father, (Note: Nor, for that matter, for Alice and Edith.) and Captain Cuttle for Florence, though they form an affectionate duo. This recalls a familiar pattern in Dickens's work, where a grandfather figure takes over in Little Dorrit, a surrogate father in David Copperfield, a guardian in Bleak House, and a kind uncle in Great Expectations. In Dombey and Son, the paternal figure is not restored at the novel's end. The final image the reader is left with is no longer that of a father, but of a diminished grandfather, suddenly without edge, entirely dependent on his daughter, reduced, in essence, to the status of Wemmick's "Aged P.," an "Old P." — less senile, less foolish, and less grotesque. His moral regeneration has come, after all, at the cost of a regression. By integrating into the world of the Wooden Midshipman, he does not transcend it but rather levels himself with a group of characters who, gently dreaming in the limbo of good intentions, are never portrayed as models of creativity or active transformation. As Louis Gondebeaud writes, "a former 'bad character' must sever himself from his social and intellectual ties — and he does so as though he had finally discovered the light." In sum, for Dickens, the ideal family is rather matriarchal: by the end of Dombey and Son, the most important character has once again become Florence — the angel of the home, the loving wife, the attentive mother, the affectionate daughter, responsible for everyone and everything, foreshadowing the good Esther Summerson and providing a counterpart to the Agnes.

That would be a surface-level view, and some critics have suggested that the relationship between Mr. Dombey and Florence — in which, they say, the father's role is far more interesting than the daughter's — is based on a sentiment hitherto absent from Dickensian fiction: jealousy. Kathleen Tillotson had already shown that "in Dombey and Son, Dickens achieves the remarkable feat of making us aware of the character's secret depths while keeping them largely hidden."

=== Dombey, possibly a jealous father ===
Hilary Shor observes that the strong emotional and physical bond Florence displays toward her dying mother serves to exclude the father, suggesting an initial dynamic marked by displacement and the emergence of jealousy. Following her mother's death, Florence forms a close attachment to her younger brother. The narrative suggests that Dombey is not unaffected by this development. A frequently referenced scene illustrates this dynamic: upon hearing a gentle voice, Dombey exits his study and sees Florence struggling to carry Little Paul up the stairs; "they disappeared from his view, and his gaze lingered upward until the mournful rays of the moon, shining bleakly through the dark skylight, sent him back into his office." Q. D. Leavis notes Dombey's apparent "exclusion in this scene." After Little Paul's death, Dickens attributes symbolic significance to the staircase: "the master of the house rarely set foot upon it, but it was by that way that his little child had ascended to heaven." Nanako Konoshima writes: "Florence innocently intensifies Dombey's jealousy and his unfavorable impression of her, so much so that every attempt she makes to draw closer to him is doomed to fail."

Nina Auerbach points to certain parallels between Florence and her father, particularly in their shared inability to communicate reciprocally, whether through expression or speech. According to Auerbach, this dynamic constitutes a form of mutual blindness. This metaphor is illustrated when Florence, during her nocturnal visits to her father while he sleeps, is described as being "blinded" by her tears. Similarly, Dombey remains unaware of his daughter's qualities, a condition Dickens emphasizes by referring to him as a "blind fool." This symbolic blindness is further reinforced during the train journey with Major Bagstock, where Dombey fails to register visual stimuli, instead perceiving only the rhythmic sounds of the rails, which evoke the memory of his deceased son. It is only after the collapse of his business that Dombey begins to recall his daughter's consistent kindness, leading to a gradual recognition of her true character: "Oh, how the mist through which he had seen her had cleared away, and how it revealed her to him in her true light!"

In conclusion, Nina Auerbach argues that "Dombey ultimately becomes Florence," initially through his experience of the same hardships she faced—solitude, abandonment, and the emotional emptiness of the household—and subsequently through his recognition of her identity, as someone who is "a girl after all."

=== Dombey and the femininity of his daughter ===
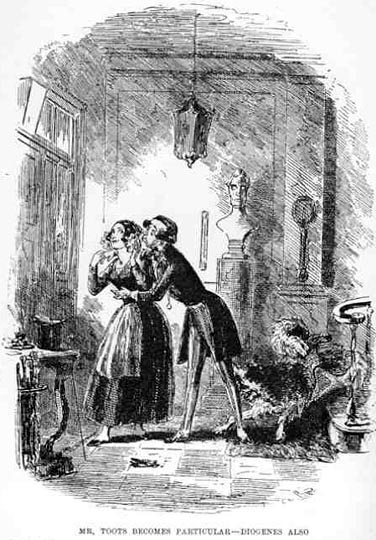
Mr. Toots suddenly develops a strong affection for Florence (chapter 22).

Florence's admirer, Mr. Toots, refers to her as "the most beautiful, the kindest, the most angelic of all women," a description that Kristina Aikens interprets as an acknowledgment of "her sexual energy." The narrative marks a turning point when Dombey returns from his honeymoon—a term explicitly rejected by Edith—at which moment he becomes aware that his daughter has matured into adulthood. From this point forward, the text adopts, as Louis Gondebeaud notes, "although implicitly, charged with sexual connotations."

The scene in Chapter 35 is divided into two distinct segments: the first is internally focalized through Dombey's perspective, granting access to his inner thoughts; the second transitions back to the narrator's voice, who resumes control of the narrative. Both segments serve to illustrate the emotional disruption experienced by a character previously portrayed as unyielding, prompted by the sight of a daughter he had largely overlooked. Dickens underscores the intensity of Dombey's reaction through references to his concealed gaze, shortened breath, and inability to avert his eyes. The narrative then shifts to the office—a space from which Florence had previously been excluded. In this moment, she is not only permitted to enter but becomes the focus of another sustained gaze, this time obscured by a handkerchief positioned to suggest sleep. The narrator comments: "The more he looked at her, the more he softened toward her, yes, more and more [...] She no longer appeared to him [...] as a rival—a monstrous thought—but as the spirit of his household [...] He felt the urge to speak to her, to call her to his side. The words 'Florence, come here!' rose to his lips, but slowly and with difficulty, so strange did they seem, and they were interrupted and stifled by the sound of a footstep on the stairs."

The narrative does not suggest the presence of any incestuous desire on Dombey's part. Instead, it reveals that Florence has gradually assumed roles he had believed to be unnecessary: she becomes a maternal figure to Little Paul, a source of support to Edith, and, ultimately, a caring daughter to him. However, Linda Zwinger, citing critics she describes as "subtly misogynistic," notes an alternative interpretation in which Florence is seen as someone who "tortures her father through emotional blackmail and selfish demands for attention." Regardless of interpretation, Dombey becomes aware—though it remains uncertain whether he is willing to acknowledge it openly—that feminine affection has been a persistent presence in his household: initially in the form of a child, and later as a young woman approaching maturity. Louis Gondebeaud observes that "if Florence long appeared to be the focal point of a web of negative feelings in her father, the time has come for him to glimpse his frustrations, which, after having paralyzed him, will ultimately sublimate into an avuncular attitude."

=== Dombey and the sacrifice of the son ===
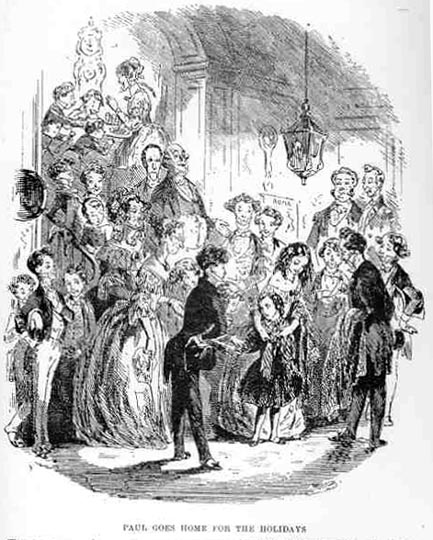
“Getting more and more old-fashioned,” Little Paul prepares to leave Brighton for vacation (ch 14), by Phiz.

The relationship between Little Paul and his father is marked by ambiguity. Mr. Dombey frequently displays emotional distance, as if the cold atmosphere of the household had permeated his own affective responses. Despite this, his attention is directed exclusively toward his son—though not through affectionate regard, but through pride and ambition. His involvement is primarily limited to overseeing Paul's education, which is portrayed as strict and isolating, and later delegated to the school in Brighton, described metaphorically as a hothouse in which young plants are forced to grow rapidly, only to be overwhelmed. Dickens presents Paul as a child distinct from others, attributing to him a sancta simplicitas that aligns with the literary archetype of the puer senex. This characterization is particularly emphasized in Chapter 14, titled with the phrase "grows more and more old-fashioned," which is repeated throughout the chapter. This quality is expressed through his calm demeanor, habitual clasping of hands, appreciation of natural elements such as waves and clouds, lack of interest in material wealth, and a quiet desire to live in the countryside with Florence. His wishes include walking in the fields, tending a garden, observing birds, and enjoying silence and the transition into night. The narrator describes Paul as existing in harmony with the natural world, suggesting a deep connection with the broader order of the cosmos.

This strange son has been sacrificed by the father, as emphasized by David Lee Miller, who places this example within the long tradition going back to Isaac, about to be killed by his father Abraham on God's command, (Note: One day, God told Abraham to offer Isaac as a sacrifice offering on Mount Moriah. Abraham split wood and set out with Isaac, a donkey, and two servants. After three days of walking, he told the servants to stay with the donkey, saying that he would go farther with his son to worship. He placed the wood on Isaac. On the way, Isaac asked where the lamb for the burnt offering was, and Abraham replied that he entrusted it to God. Once they arrived, Abraham built an altar, arranged the wood, and bound his son to the pyre. As he reached out his hand to sacrifice Isaac, an angel—convinced of the fear of God that Abraham felt—cried out for him to spare Isaac. A ram, which Abraham saw caught in a thicket, was sacrificed in his place.) and connects it to Shakespeare's The Winter's Tale.

Although the death of the child is deeply poignant, it does not erase the figure of the son, as his role is taken up by Walter. The young man becomes a kind of posthumous double of the deceased, embarking aboard the symbolic Son and Heir, and evoking in Florence a powerful feeling that initially appears fraternal: "Ah! If only he were my brother now!" She even confuses the two characters in Chapter 49 when she exclaims: "Oh, dear, dear Paul. Oh! Walter!" In this sense, the return of the second son, long thought lost, can be interpreted as a form of resurrection for the first. The parallel between Paul and Walter is further emphasized by the shared animosity they face from James Carker: Paul's death removed a clear rival for power, while Walter's disappearance is seen as a fortuitous event that clears the path to Florence for Carker.

=== Mother and daughter ===
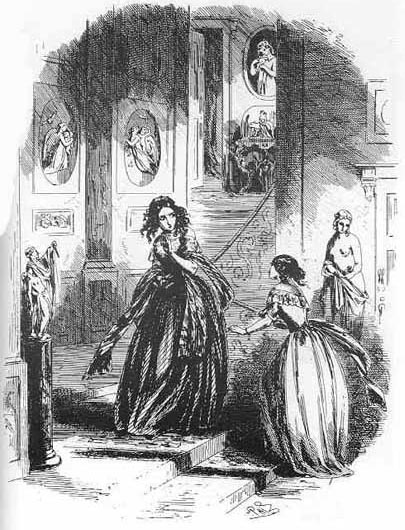
Florence and Edith on the stairs shortly before their escape, by Phiz.

The father's absence is not the only one lamented by Dickens. Almost all the mothers depicted in Dombey and Son are portrayed negatively, either alienated from their children or, like Mrs. Brown and Mrs. Skewton, viewing them as commodities to be displayed at the marriage market. Furthermore, no true surrogate mother figure emerges among the older women surrounding Mr. Dombey or within the circle of the "Wooden Midshipman." On one side, Mrs. Chick, with only minor differences, shares Dombey's indifference; on the other, Mrs. MacStinger remains a cantankerous figure, offering no contrast to the future Mrs. Gargery. Driven solely by the ambition to continue her career as a scold, she appears as if propelled by an inexhaustible energy.

The only acceptable maternal figure in Dombey and Son—aside from Polly Toodle—appears to be Edith Granger, the second Mrs. Dombey, who directs all the energy of her frustration toward Florence. Françoise Basch observes that in Dickens's work, "the innocence and purity of angelic beings like Florence arouse in impure women—tormented, yet solitary and entrenched in their pride—a sort of inner conversion, a softening." However, Edith is not a mother but a stepmother, and Dickens imbues their relationship with significant pathos—particularly in the moment when Florence refers to her as "Mama." The narrator feels the need to remind the reader that the real mother is absent, and that this "Mama" remains, in essence, a stranger.

In reality, the only figure representing the ideal mother is Florence herself. She serves as the antidote to the negative maternal figures in the novel, such as the Good Mrs. Browns and other Mrs. Skewtons. So much so that Florence becomes the embodiment of universal love, extending her affection not only to all fellow humans, regardless of gender, but also to all sensitive beings in nature, to whom she freely offers her care.

== Characterization ==
Dombey and Son initially introduces a wide array of "mood-characters," each characterized by distinctive eccentricities in behavior, speech, gestures, clothing, and other traits, as well as characters who are victims of their family or society. To bring both types to life, Dickens employs a variety of techniques rooted in the eighteenth-century tradition. These include satirical and humorous approaches for the former group, while the latter is often portrayed through more melodramatic and sentimental methods.

=== Amiable humorist ===
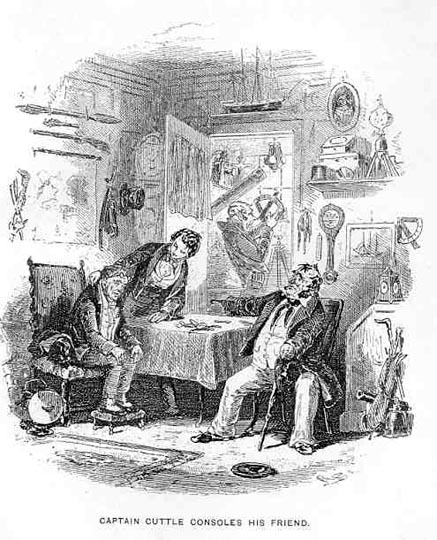
Commander Cuttle consoles Solomon Gills, by Phiz.

Captain Cuttle never parts with his satin-finished hat, nor Mr. Toots with his custom-tailored suits—a true obsession for him. Gills, Cuttle, and Bunsby all display the same roughness of seasoned seafarers, yet they are easily tamed by the beauty and gentleness of Florence—or, conversely, by the terror imposed by the formidable Mrs. MacStinger. To use the distinctions established by Joseph Addison, these are "true humours," as opposed to "false humours"—the latter being characters with natural imperfections but good intentions toward others, though often confronted by the selfishness, malice, and cunning of the outside world.

Although these characters are portrayed as "humours," they are not "humorists," meaning they are not pleasant observers of life. Unlike Dr. Primrose from The Vicar of Wakefield by Oliver Goldsmith, or Yorick from A Sentimental Journey by Laurence Sterne—both works written in the first person—these characters require a visible and relevant narrator. This narrator takes the form of a third-person omniscient voice, which draws from the eighteenth-century tradition of writers such as Fielding, Smollett, and Sterne in Tristram Shandy and Humphry Clinker. Captain Cuttle, for instance, bears some resemblance to Matthew Bramble from Humphry Clinker, although Smollett's character, while gentle and generous like Captain Cuttle, is also able to maintain a more composed demeanor when necessary. Dickens, in this context, steps in to fulfill the role of the "amiable humorist," treating his characters with kindness and preventing them from descending into pettiness. These characters thus align with William Congreve's 1695 definition: "[they have] a manner all their own and unchanging in their actions and speech, which distinguishes them from their peers."

Through this technique, Dickens assumes the role of a chronicler of contradictions, eccentricities, and human inconsistencies. He gently demystifies Captain Cuttle, whose outward appearance is virile and even military, with the gruff speech typical of seafarers, only to reveal him as a shy, gentle, and enthusiastic man—an idealistic figure, foreign to pettiness, yet buffeted by the harshness of Dombey's world. Dickens's role as a humorist is evident in how he draws the reader's attention to the angelic nature of Captain Cuttle's blindness, the naivety of his good faith, and the ineffectiveness of his virtuous indignation. In contrast, Solomon Gills presents a more ambiguous case. While he is clearly a "humour-character," as depicted in his portrait in Chapter 4, the narrator prompts a smile by emphasizing the narrow-mindedness of his outdated management style. However, he is spared the catastrophe that seems inevitable, thanks to two seemingly incongruous miracles—financial help from Dombey and an unexpected return on old investments.

With these characters, Dickens subtly balances sentiment and irony. This is evident in a scene from Chapter 32, where Captain Cuttle, unable to hold back a tear at the memory of Walter, symbolically wipes the drops from the shop sign with his sleeve before transferring the damp sleeve to his cheek. Dickens avoids melodrama in this moment, offering no additional commentary, and instead provides a slight wink to the reader through the somewhat pedantic use of the verb "to transfer."

=== Ironic satirist ===
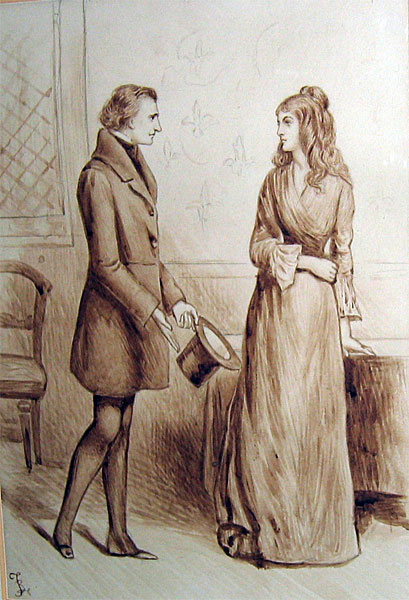
Mr Carker and Edith Dombey, by Fred Barnard.

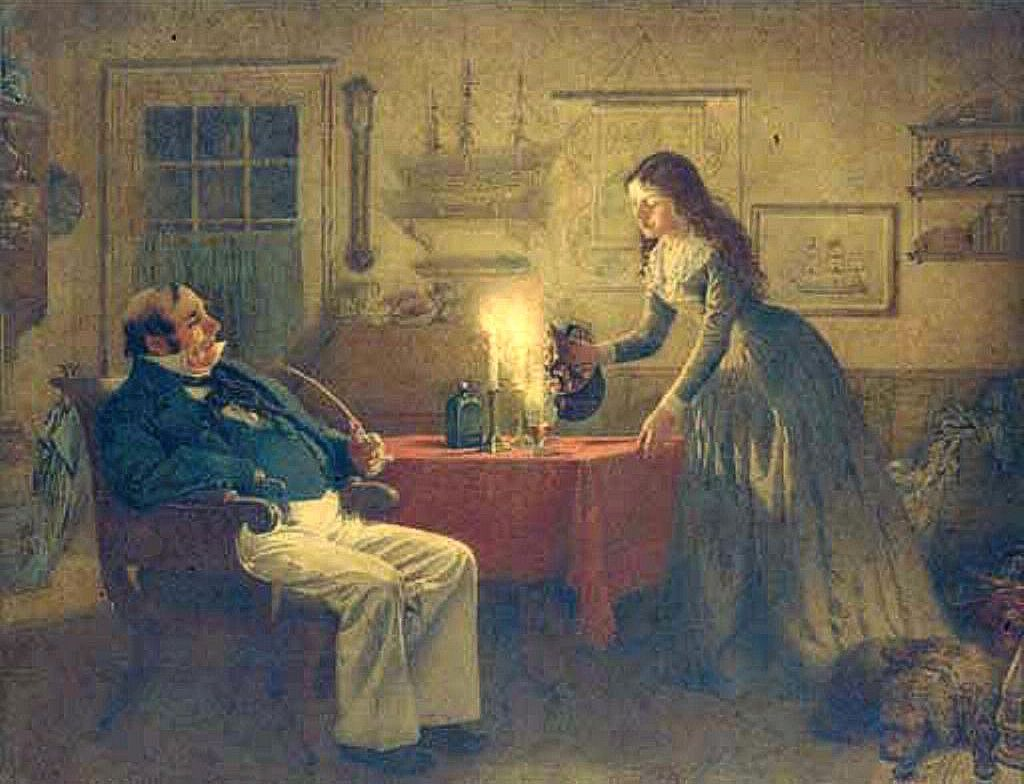
Captain Cuttle and Florence Dombey, by Charles Green.

Some characters in Dombey and Son can be classified as "false eccentrics" or "false humours," marked by affectation and a moral emptiness that fosters sovereign selfishness. This category includes characters such as Mrs. Skewton, J. B. Bagstock, Mr. Chick, and the Blimber family in Brighton. Mrs. Skewton is preoccupied with appearances and feigns reverence for the past, but this is purely for show. Joey B. is known for his mannered speech, sudden displays of phony generosity, and a friendship that is both unexpected and quickly withdrawn. Mr. Chick is portrayed as enamored with whistling outdated tunes, while the Blimbers engage in what Louis Gondebeaud terms "true verbal necrophilia." Dickens portrays these characters through an ironic lens, exposing them for what they are in a straightforward manner. He reduces them to caricatures defined by their mannerisms, weaknesses, and absurdities. Their characterization is limited to these traits, and no deeper psychological exploration is attempted. As a result, they are consistently described through action or gestures that substitute for any deeper psychological insight. When confronted with significant events—such as Mrs. Dombey's death, Mr. Dombey's second marriage, or Edith's flight with Carker—these characters are condemned to repeat their behaviors, responding in ways that align with the predetermined patterns assigned to them.

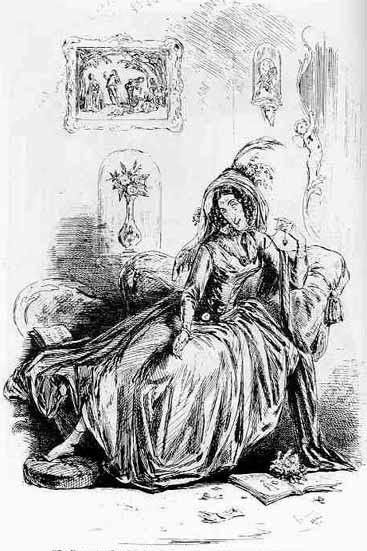
Mrs Skewton, by Hablot Knight Browne, separate print from monthly publications.

These characters, while seemingly reduced to mere caricatures, are not without impact on the reader. They become grotesque figures who have reached the final stage of psychological mummification, their lives reduced to a lifestyle—an artificial and mechanical semblance of life. Suspended in time, as though frozen in an endlessly renewed present, they represent a perversion of nature at its lowest point. As a result, they take on a dual significance: they are meant to be humorous but also transcend their comic dimension to embody obsessions, fixed ideas, and real-life vices. In this way, they contribute to the overall structure of the novel. Mrs. Skewton is a notable example: similar to her counterpart, Deportment Turveydrop, she appears as an overdecorated figure, where everything is artificial—teeth, wigs, padding—and this garishly adorned figure, almost a mannequin, lives off her daughter, whom she manipulates under the guise of maternal concern. She distorts the concepts of love and duty, which she hypocritically espouses, and emerges as a self-serving figure driven by parasitic selfishness. The reader may perceive an "interior" that is as false as the "exterior," recognizing this parody of motherhood as responsible for her daughter's degradation and, more broadly, the corruption of her entire social class. In this way, she fits within the category of "false parents," whose monstrosity Dickens critiques throughout the novel.

=== Sentimental narrator ===
That Dombey and Son contains tears, drama, and a great deal of sentiment is undeniable, and Dickens was long criticized for it. This criticism, however, failed to take into account that his audience was, as Leslie Stephen rather maliciously put it, "half-educated," and that his century was particularly prone to sentimentality—perfectly inclined to follow the advice (Note: The full quote from Wilkie Collins is: "Make them cry, make them laugh, make them wait.") of Wilkie Collins: "Make them cry."

==== Characters falling under sentimentalism ====
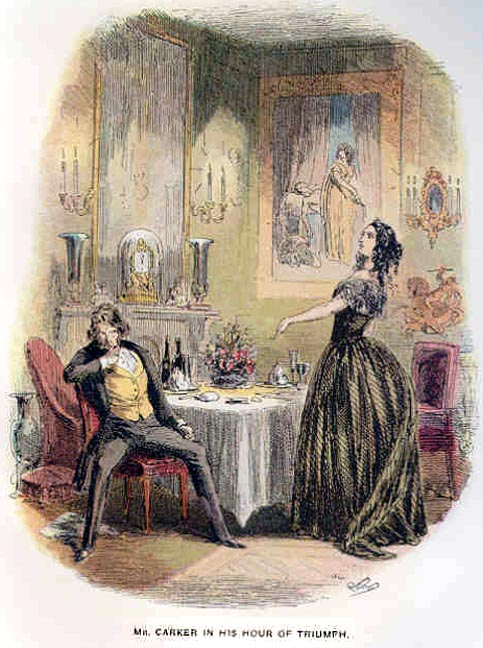
Edith defies Carker in France, by Phiz (colorized image).

Sentimentalism and melodrama are conventional, particularly when applied to the situation of children, who often represent a society that, through ignorance or selfishness, marginalizes the weakest through its family system and its charitable or educational institutions. This is evident in the case of the motherless orphans: little Paul, who faces misunderstanding, harshness, and indifference, compounded by his adult-like intuition and intelligence; and Florence, the figure of the solitary and neglected home, whose circumstances make her particularly susceptible to emotional distress, as highlighted by Sylvère Monod, who notes that she experiences "eighty-eight sobbing fits throughout the novel."

However, it is not only children who experience this heavy-handed pathos; it is also present in the portrayal of women labeled as "fallen," such as Alice Marwood (chapter 33), who reflects on her hardships: "bad conduct, and remorse, travels, hunger, and bad weather, the storm within me and around me, have worn out my life. It won't last much longer." Edith Granger, though not tearful, is often depicted in dramatic poses, adopting a noble bearing and an intense posture, such as when she holds a knife at the Hôtel de Dijon. Sylvère Monod is critical of her fate, describing it as artificial: "she is nothing more than a perverse woman," he writes, "who ruins a man's career by marrying him without love and refusing to submit to his will, then causes another's death by appearing to be his lover. Above all, she is inexplicable." He concludes, "Thus, in Dombey, pathos claims a royal share." Kathleen Tillotson offers a less absolute view, seeing melodrama as "a way to make the sinner acceptable in the context of family reading." Françoise Basch adds that, within this genre, "the sinner becomes both a familiar character and one perfectly alien to daily life, and thus harmless."

==== Obligatory scenes and techniques ====
These often emotional characters are accompanied by stereotypical scenes, many of which draw on elements from the novels of Richardson or Goldsmith. The narrative includes familiar moments, such as the deathbed scene of the first Mrs. Dombey, full of heavy symbolism, and the poignant death of little Paul, marked by gestures and words intended to evoke strong emotional responses, a sentiment that many contemporary readers acknowledged feeling. This is further enhanced by a domestic sentimentalism, reminiscent of The Vicar of Wakefield, touching the Toodle family and the residents of "The Wooden Midshipman." There are also contrasting moments of departure and reunion, such as Edith's emotional farewell to Florence, marked by dramatic speeches and silences, or Walter's return to Florence, followed shortly by the exuberant reappearance of Solomon Gills, who had gone in search of him.

Dickens employs many other traditional devices, including theatricality that heightens poses and amplifies words, which often take on a more literary tone; authorial intrusions that infuse the narrative with recurring symbolism focused on the sea, waves, and rivers; or direct apostrophes to characters, delivering moral and indignant reflections on Dombey's coldness, tender and exuberant remarks on Florence, and humorous indulgence regarding the inhabitants of "The Wooden Midshipman."

==== Function of sentimentalism ====
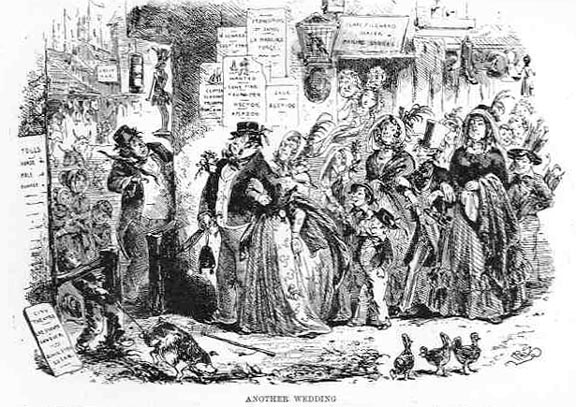
The marriage of Florence and Walter by Phiz.

Nowadays, the sentimentalism and melodrama in Dombey and Son are understood to contribute to the overall framework of Dickens's creative vision. Northrop Frye, for instance, suggests that the novel represents "a version of the sentimental romance privileging Providence, passivity, and patience over deliberate action upon history."

Dickens centers the theme of innocence in his novel, positioning it in contrast to the fallen world of adults, who are tainted by materialism (Dombey) or sexual desire (Edith and, particularly, Alice Marwood). In this context, Florence plays a pivotal role, as she belongs to "a structure of patriarchal kinship" and remains a child under parental authority, yet is promoted into adulthood as an eternal, idealized figure. Her purity remains intact, but she is denied the status of a fairy-tale princess. According to Louis Gondebeaud, Florence embodies "a form of passivity joined with a power of redemption; more than a sentimental heroine, she seems to represent a Christian figure, akin to the Virgin Mary."

In Dombey and Son, the parents—except for the Toodles—attempt to strip their children of their childhood. Little Paul, for instance, is forced into accelerated maturity at the Blimber institution in Brighton, which causes him to lose all joy in life and fade away before ever experiencing the carefree nature of childhood. Florence, who accompanies him, survives because, as a girl, she is somewhat shielded from the same demanding education that overwhelms her younger brother. Other children, such as Rob the Grinder, resist this forced maturation, finding refuge in a path that borders on delinquency. Before him, characters like Alice Marwood and Edith Granger seek escape in what Northrop Frye describes as "the abyss of adult sexuality, the still unexplored country from which, in the Victorian novel, no female character returns." Unlike Florence, they prefer the status of "fallen women" over submission and passivity.

On the other hand, Walter Gay's situation stands as the sole example of success and social advancement in the narrative. Initially, Dickens had planned to give him a fate similar to that of Carker the Junior, but he ultimately chose to highlight the fairy-tale aspect of Walter's modest success. At different points, he is portrayed as a "modern-day prince," "a new Richard Whittington," and "the Saint George of England." However, despite being elevated to a somewhat legendary figure, Walter never truly emerges as an active or charismatic character. This is because Dickens envisioned him uniting with Florence in a marriage that closely mirrors a return to childhood. The title of the chapter that describes this union, "Another Wedding," not only serves as a chronological reference but also as an inverted echo of the first wedding between Dombey and Edith. Instead of being marked by blood and passion, this marriage represents an Eden of innocence, "very far from the great world around them, and located in an enchanting place," as Dickens underscores.

Dombey's final transformation can be seen as a return to childhood, or more specifically, a regression. In the opening chapter, the narrator contrasts Dombey's concerns, stating that he "had always been concerned with skins (Note: Dombey's firm imports pelts intended for fur.) and not with hearts." By the novel's conclusion, the once-proud, prematurely aged man comes to prioritize "hearts more than skins." To reach this realization, he had to sacrifice little Paul due to his own pride, ultimately adopting a form of outdated, old-fashioned maturity. In this way, he becomes a reversed version of little Paul, embodying a puer senex who transitions into a senex puerus.

Ultimately, the novel's ending cannot be categorized purely as sentimental; it instead represents Dickens's response to both social and personal conflicts. True to his worldview, Dickens's conclusion is grounded in traditional Christian values, though secularized. While the narrative doesn't fully align with the structure of a Bildungsroman, as seen in Great Expectations, which tracks the development of a child into adulthood, Northrop Frye describes it as a "sentimental family romance." This structure idealizes a somewhat conventional domestic lifestyle, emphasizing the innocence of childhood as a model to be revered.

== See also ==
- Charles Dickens
- Vision of Contemporary England in Dombey and Son
- Dombey and Son

== Bibliography ==
- Dickens, Charles (1995). Dombey and Son. Ware: Wordsworth Editions Limited. ISBN 1-85326-257-9.

=== Life and Works of Charles Dickens ===
- Forster, John (1874). The Life of Charles Dickens. London: J. M. Dent & Sons.
- Chesterton, Gilbert Keith (1911). Apprecations and Criticisms of the Works of Charles Dickens. London.
- House, Humphry (1941). The Dickens World. London: Oxford University Press.
- Johnson, Edgar (1952). Charles Dickens: His Tragedy and Triumph. 2 vols. New York: Simon and Schuster.
- Butt, John; Tillotson, Kathleen (1957). Dickens at Work. London: Methuen.
- Hillis-Miller, J (1958). Charles Dickens, The World of His Novels. Harvard: Harvard University Press.
- Cockshut, A. O. J (1962). The Imagination of Charles Dickens. New York: New York University Press.
- Marcus, Steven (1965). Dickens : From Pickwick to Dombey. New York.
- Leavis, F. R; Leavis, Q. D (1970). Dickens the Novelist. London: Chatto & Windus. ISBN 0-7011-1644-7.
- Basch, Françoise (1976). "Mythes de la femme dans le roman victorien" [Myths about women in Victorian novels]. Romantisme (in French). 6 (13): 198–214. doi:10.3406/roman.1976.5065.
- Slater, Michael (1983). Dickens and Women. London: J. M. Dent & Sons, Ltd. ISBN 0-460-04248-3.
- Ackroyd, Peter (1993). Charles Dickens. London: Stock. ISBN 978-0-09-943709-3.
- Schlicke, Paul (2000). Oxford Reader's Companion to Dickens. New York: Oxford University Press. ISBN 0-19-866253-X.
- Davis, Paul (1999). Charles Dickens A to Z : the essential reference to his life and work. New York: Facts on file. ISBN 0-8160-2905-9.
- Jordan, John O (2001). The Cambridge companion to Charles Dickens. New York: Cambridge University Press. ISBN 0-521-66964-2.
- Paroissien, David (2011). A Companion to Charles Dickens. Chichester: Wiley-Blackwell. ISBN 978-0-470-65794-2.
- Page, Norman (1984). A Dickens Companion. New York: Schocken Books.
- Monod, Sylvère (1953). Dickens romancier [Dickens the novelist] (in French). Paris: Hachette.

=== Dombey and Son ===
- Moynahan, Julian (1962). Dickens and the Twentieth Century. Toronto: University of Toronto Press.
- Axter, W (1963). "78. Tonal Unity in Dombey and Son". PMLA. pp. 341–348.
- Johnson, Edgar (1985). Dickens, Dombey and Son. Casebook Series. London: MacMillan.
- Toise, David (1999). "As Good as Nowhere: Dickens's Dombey & Son, the Contingency of Value, and Theories of Domesticity". Criticism. 41: 323–348.
- Altick, Richard D (1980). "Varieties of Readers' Response: The Case of Dombey & Son". Yearbook of English Studies. 10: 70–94. doi:10.2307/3506934. JSTOR 3506934.
- Andrews, Malcolm (1994). "Dombey & Son: the New Fashioned Man and the Old-Fashioned Child". Dickens and the Grown-Up Child. London: Macmillan.
- Arac, Jonathan (1978). "The House and the Railroad: Dombey & Son and The House of the Seven Gables". New England Quarterly. 51 (1): 3–22. doi:10.2307/364588. JSTOR 364588.
- Armstrong, Mary (1996). "Pursuing Perfection: Dombey & Son, Female Homoerotic Desire, and the Sentimental Heroine". Studies in the Novel. 28: 281–302.
- Auerbach, Nina (1975). "Dickens and Dombey: A Daughter after All". Dickens Studies Annual 5: 49–67.
- Axton, William (1964). "Dombey & Son: From Stereotype to Archetype". ELH. 31 (31). Baltimore and Washington, D.C: Johns Hopkins University Press: 301–317. doi:10.2307/2872210. JSTOR 2872210.
- Baumgarten, Murray (1990). "Railway/Reading/Time: Dombey & Son and the Industrial World". Dickens Studies Annual. 19: 65–89.
- Tick, Stanley (1975). "The Unfinished Business of Dombey and Son". Modern Language Quarterly. Washington: Duke University Press: 90–402.
- Ferrieux, Robert (1991). Dombey and Son (in French and English). Perpignan: Université de Perpignan Via Domitia.
- Gondebeaud, Louis (1991). Dombey and Son (in French and English). Pau: Université de Pau et des Pays de l'Adour.
- Berry, Laura C (1996). "In the Bosom of the Family: The Wet Nurse, The Railroad, and Dombey & Son". Dickens Studies Annual. 25: 1–28.
- Boone, Joseph A; Nord, Deborah E (1992). "Brother and Sister: The Seduction of Siblinghood in Dickens, Eliot, and Brontë". Western Humanities Review. 46: 1–28.
- Clark, Robert (1984). "Riddling the Family Firm: The Sexual Economy in Dombey & Son". ELH. 51 (1): 69–84. doi:10.2307/2872805. JSTOR 2872805.
- Collins, Robert (1967). "Dombey & Son-Then and Now". Dickensian. 63: 82–94.
- Donoghue, Denis (1971). "The English Dickens and Dombey & Son". Dickens Centennial Essays, ed. Ada Nisbet and Blake Nevius. Berkeley: University of California Press.
- Dyson, A. E (1970). "Dombey & Son: cobwebs to sunlight". The Inimitable Dickens. New York: St. Martin's Press.
- Elfenbein, Andrew (1995). "Managing the House in Dombey & Son". Studies in Philology. 92: 361–382.
- Flint, Kate (2001). "The Middle Novels: Chuzzlewit, Dombey, and Copperfield". The Cambridge Companion to Charles Dickens, ed. John O. Jordan. Cambridge: Cambridge University Press.
- Green, Michael. "Notes on Fathers and Sons from Dombey & Son in 1848". The Sociology of Literature, éd. Francis Barker et al, Colchester, University of Essex, 1978.
- Henkle, Roger B (1994). "The Crisis of Representation in Dombey & Son". Critical Reconstructions: The Relationship of Fiction and Life (Robert Polhemus and Roger Henkle ed.). Stanford: Stanford University Press.
- Tambling, Jeremy (1993). "Death and Modernity in Dombey & Son". Essays in Criticism (43): 308–329. doi:10.1093/eic/XLIII.4.308.
- Tillotson, Kathleen (1954). Dombey & Son in Novels of the Eighteen-Forties. Oxford: Oxford University Press.
- Tillotson, Kathleen (1968). "New Readings in Dombey & Son". Imagined Worlds : Essays on Some English Novels and Novelists in Honour of John Butt (Maynard Mack et al ed.). London: Methuen.
- Weiss, Barbara (1986). The Hell of the English : Bankruptcy and the Victorian Novel. Lewisburg: Bucknell University Press. ISBN 0-8387-5099-0.
- Waters, Catherine (1988). "Ambiguous Intimacy: Brother and Sister Relationships in Dombey & Son". Dickensian. 84: 9–26.
- Wiley, Margaret (1996). "Mother's Milk and Dombey's Son". Dickens Quarterly. 13: 217–228.
- Yelin, Louise (1979). "Strategies for Survival: Florence and Edith in Dombey & Son". Victorian Studies. 22: 297–311.
- Zwinger, Lynda (1985). "The Fear of the Father: Dombey & Daughter". Nineteenth-Century Fiction. 39 (4): 420–440. doi:10.2307/3044713. JSTOR 3044713.
