= Cinque Ports (1703 ship) =

English ship (sank 1704)

History

England
- Name: Cinque Ports
- Fate: Sank, 1704

General characteristics
- Tons burthen: 130 bm
- Length: 172 ft (52 m)
- Beam: 33 ft (10 m)
- Propulsion: Sail
- Complement: 63
- Armament: 16 guns

Cinque Ports is also the name for a group of five English port towns, the namesake of this ship.

Cinque Ports was an English ship whose sailing master was Alexander Selkirk, generally accepted as a model for the fictional Robinson Crusoe. The ship was part of a 1703 expedition commanded by William Dampier, who captained the accompanying ship, the 26-gun St George with a complement of 120 men.

When the War of the Spanish Succession broke out in 1701, English privateers were recruited to act against French and Spanish interests. Despite a court-martial for cruelty to one of his crew in an earlier voyage, Dampier was granted command of the two-ship expedition which departed England on 30 April 1703 for the port of Kinsale in Ireland.

== Fateful voyage ==
William Dampier's original companions dropped out of the scheme and a new agreement was made with Captain Charles Pickering of Cinque Ports. Cinque Ports was fitted out with 16 guns and a crew of 63. The two ships left Kinsale on 11 September 1703 with the intention of attacking Spanish galleons returning from Buenos Aires. When this plan fell through the privateers decided to make for the South Sea by way of Cape Horn. While the ships were off the coast of Brazil, an outbreak of scurvy on board Cinque Ports led to the deaths of a number of men, including the captain, who was replaced by 21-year-old Lieutenant Thomas Stradling.

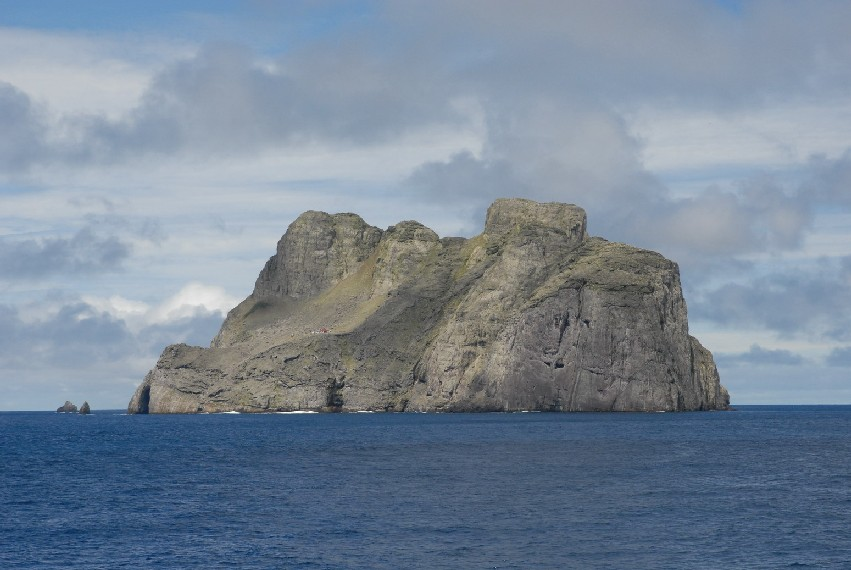
The small, barren island of Malpelo offered little to sustain the survivors of Cinque Ports' shipwreck

After rounding the Horn and cruising up the South American coast as far as Panama, capturing several Spanish ships on the way, the two captains decided to separate. Captain Stradling stopped at one of the islands of the Juan Fernández Archipelago off the Chilean coast in September 1704 to resupply. There was a dispute between Stradling and Alexander Selkirk regarding Cinque Ports' seaworthiness, and Selkirk impetuously chose to be put ashore on the uninhabited island.

Selkirk remained on Juan Fernández in solitude for four years and four months, before being rescued by Woodes Rogers in 1709. His experience was one of the likely sources of inspiration for the character Robinson Crusoe in the novel by Daniel Defoe. Selkirk's suspicions had proven justified; Cinque Ports foundered near Malpelo Island 400 km (250 mi) from the coast of what is now Colombia; Stradling and the surviving members of his crew were taken prisoner by the Spanish.

== Aftermath ==
An eyewitness account of the last voyage of Cinque Ports was published by William Funnell, an officer on board St George, who went on to circumnavigate the globe after abandoning Dampier in January 1705. The owners of Cinque Ports subsequently took legal action against Dampier over the loss of their ship. According to a deposition given by Selkirk on 18 July 1712, Dampier's failure to advise the owners to have Cinque Ports and St George covered in protective wood sheathing had resulted in "the loss of both ships, for they perished by being worm eaten." Other witnesses supported this allegation. The shipowners would be disappointed, however, as Dampier died in 1715, leaving nothing but debts.
