= Robinson Crusoe (1997 film) =

1997 film by Rod Hardy and George T. Miller

- Home Video release poster
- Directed by: Rod Hardy; George T. Miller
- Written by: Christopher Lofton; Tracy Keenan Wynn; Christopher Canaan
- Produced by: Njeri Karago
- Starring: Pierce Brosnan; William Takaku; Polly Walker; Ian Hart; James Frain; Damian Lewis; Martin Grace
- Cinematography: David Connell
- Edited by: Sue Blainey; Richard Bracken; Tod Scott Brady; Greg Feathermann; Keith Reamer; Kevin Stitt; David Zieff
- Music by: Jennie Muskett
- Production companies: Miramax Films; RHI Entertainment
- Distributed by: Buena Vista Pictures
- Release dates: June 12, 1997 (Singapore); June 13, 1997 (U.S.)
- Running time: 90 minutes
- Country: United States
- Language: English

Robinson Crusoe is a 1997 American adventure survival drama film directed by Rod Hardy and George T. Miller, based on Daniel Defoe's 1719 novel. It stars Pierce Brosnan in the title role and William Takaku as Friday, along with Polly Walker, Ian Hart, James Frain, and Damian Lewis.

== Plot ==
The film opens to a fictionalized Daniel Defoe being offered to read a castaway's autobiography. He grudgingly obliges and begins to get engrossed in the narrative.

Robinson Crusoe is a Scottish gentleman with experience in the Royal Navy and the British army. He accidentally kills his lifelong friend Patrick in a duel over his childhood love Mary. Patrick's brothers arrive and threaten Crusoe, but his page manages to buy time for an escape. Fleeing back to Mary, Crusoe subsequently ends up leaving for a year so that Mary can attempt to smooth over relations with Patrick's family.

Crusoe joins the merchant marine transporting assorted cargoes between ports in the Pacific, Indian and Atlantic oceans. He chronicles the ship's journeys at the behest of the captain until a typhoon shipwrecks him near the coast of New Guinea.

On his first day ashore on the island he buries other crew members who had washed up on the surrounding beaches. The next day he heads to the ship, which has beached itself on a reef. He salvages tools, supplies and weapons from the ship. Crusoe also frees the captain's corgi Skipper from a supply room. Crusoe begins to acclimate himself to the island while hoping for a passing European ship. One day a ship finally appears, but Crusoe notices it too late to be rescued. Crusoe resolves to acclimate himself to the island and moves inland, building a shelter and growing food.

One day he hears ominous drums and human voices. Investigating the noises he finds a tribe from a nearby island making human sacrifices. After two prisoners have been sacrificed Crusoe intervenes by firing his weapon, which allows the third prisoner to escape. Later he meets the escaped native and attempts to befriend him. Cultural and language barriers prevent him from communicating before they are attacked by a group of the tribesmen. He witnesses the native cut out the heart of a defeated enemy and calls him a savage heathen before fleeing to his shelter and preparing a defence.

Days later Crusoe falls into a snare laid by the native. Crusoe communicates the danger and potency of his firearms on a bat, which allows them to begin communicating. He names the man Friday and has himself referred to as Master. Within six months Friday has learned the basics of English, but when Crusoe attempts to convert him to Christianity, Friday refuses and an argument ensues. Friday separates himself from Crusoe. Missing the companionship, Crusoe attempts to make peace with Friday.

Reunited, the two set a trap for the tribe of natives who attempted to sacrifice Friday before. Once they arrive Crusoe lights a fuse leading to a load of gunpowder, but Skipper chases after the lit fuse and also dies in the explosion. At Skipper's funeral Crusoe gains a deeper appreciation for Friday's religion.

Later Crusoe decides they must leave the island due to an impending attack by the native tribe. Friday mentions that he has heard of New Britain. He says he cannot take Crusoe to his home island because he is considered dead for being a sacrifice and he cannot go to New Britain because the Europeans enslave his people. Friday subsequently learns that "Master" is not Crusoe's real name, but an indicator of enslavement and once again leaves Crusoe, who subsequently attempts to build a canoe to get to New Britain by himself.

A typhoon arrives while Crusoe has nearly finished his boat. Friday returns and accepts that Crusoe had decided not to make him a slave. The two attempt to salvage their crops and wildlife, but the typhoon destroys them – as well as Crusoe's canoe. The pair set traps to defend the island, but expect to die in the defense.

The tribesmen arrive in force. Crusoe and Friday manage to defend the island, but Crusoe is shot by an arrow. Friday decides to try to save Crusoe by taking him to his home island. Upon arriving there Friday's tribe capture Crusoe, believing him to have come to enslave the people. They force Crusoe to fight Friday to the death for his freedom. After sparing Friday, Crusoe demands his friend kill him so that he may live. Suddenly, a group of European slavers arrive, killing Friday. Crusoe is rescued, but is devastated by Friday's death. The slavers tend to Crusoe's wounds, and bring him to Lisbon. From there, he sails home, and is reunited with Mary.

Daniel Defoe tells his publisher that he must write Crusoe's story.

== Cast ==
- Pierce Brosnan as Robinson Crusoe
- William Takaku as Man Friday
- Polly Walker as Mary McGregor
- Ian Hart as Daniel Defoe
- James Frain as Robert, Defoe's Publisher
- Damian Lewis as Patrick Connor
- Ben Robertson as James, Patrick's Brother
- Martin Grace as Captain Braga
- Sean Brosnan as Cabin boy
- Lysette Anthony as Mrs. Crusoe
- Tim McMulian as Crusoe's Second
- Mal Tobias as Patrick Connor's Second
- Jim Clark as Slave Ship Captain

== Production ==
The film was shot in Papua New Guinea, in addition to taking place around that area. Ron Hardy and George T. Miller, who both co-directed Robinson Crusoe, were originally from Australia, which is one of the closest landmasses to New Guinea. Daniel Defoe's original 1719 novel was set in the Caribbean, although the book itself was based on the real Alexander Selkirk, who was marooned on the Juan Fernández Islands, which are located in the South Pacific Ocean. New Guinea is within the South Pacific Ocean, but the Juan Fernández Islands are over 13,000 kilometers away from it, between Easter Island and Chile. Unlike New Guinea, the Juan Fernández Islands were also uninhabited prior to being discovered by Europeans.

Miramax presold Japanese distribution rights to Shochiku along with Gary Fleder's Things to Do in Denver When You're Dead, Four Rooms, John Ehle's The Journey of August King and Joe Chappelle's Halloween: The Curse of Michael Myers in a bulk acquisition deal.

== Reception ==
Due to a very limited release, never debuting theatrically in the United States or United Kingdom, the film did not receive any widespread press or critical attention. Among the few reviews available, Radio Times gave it two stars, finding Brosnan 'unconvincing' in the lead role. DVD Talk praised Brosnan's performance, but felt that the pacing was too fast and did not allow for proper immersion.

== Home media ==
On home video, the film was initially distributed by Buena Vista Home Entertainment, who at that time handled home video releases for the film's producer Miramax. Throughout the second half of 1997, Buena Vista Home Entertainment released it direct-to-video in numerous European countries. The film received an Australian VHS release in approximately late 1999 through Buena Vista Home Entertainment, and a U.S. DVD/VHS release on January 22, 2002, also through Buena Vista Home Entertainment.

In December 2010, Miramax was sold by The Walt Disney Company, their owners since 1993. That month, the studio was taken over by private equity firm Filmyard Holdings. Filmyard licensed the home media rights for lower profile Miramax titles to Echo Bridge Entertainment, with higher profile titles being licensed to Lionsgate Home Entertainment. On May 24, 2011, Echo Bridge reissued the film on DVD. Filmyard terminated Echo Bridge's distribution agreement in 2014, and a later DVD reissue in 2015 was instead handled by Lionsgate. This 2015 Lionsgate issue had the same artwork as the Echo Bridge issue, and also had a digital download code for the film. In 2011, Filmyard Holdings licensed the Miramax library to streamer Netflix. This deal included Robinson Crusoe, and ran for five years, eventually ending on June 1, 2016.

Filmyard Holdings sold Miramax to Qatari company beIN Media Group during March 2016. In April 2020, ViacomCBS (now known as Paramount Skydance) acquired the rights to Miramax's library, after buying a 49% stake in the studio from beIN. Robinson Crusoe was one of the 700 titles they acquired in the deal, and since April 2020, the film has been distributed on digital platforms by Paramount Pictures. Paramount Home Entertainment started reissuing many Miramax titles, and reissued Robinson Crusoe on DVD with new artwork on July 27, 2021.

Some post-2000 releases had the tagline "the original Cast Away", in reference to the 2000 film which had similar plot themes. Both Cast Away and Robinson Crusoe ended up becoming part of the same corporate umbrella, as in 2006, Paramount acquired the live-action library of that film's co-producer DreamWorks Pictures.
