= Robinson Crusoe =

1719 novel by Daniel Defoe

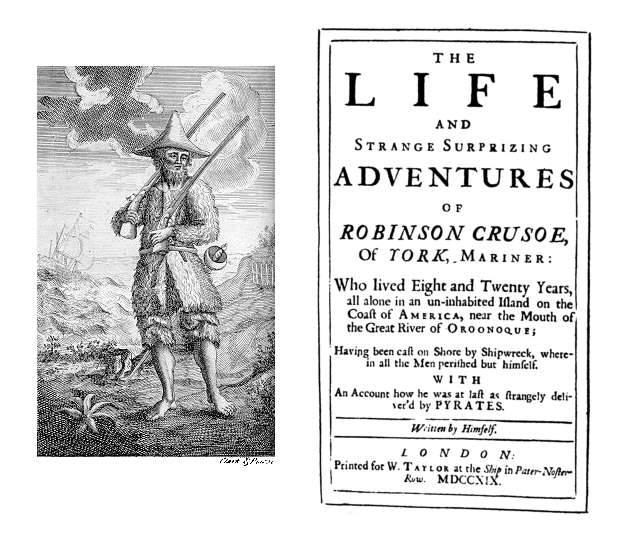
- Title page from the first edition
- Author: Daniel Defoe
- Original title: The Life and Strange Surprizing Adventures of Robinson Crusoe, of York, Mariner: Who lived Eight and Twenty Years, all alone in an un-inhabited Island on the Coast of America, near the Mouth of the Great River of Oroonoque; Having been cast on Shore by Shipwreck, wherein all the Men perished but himself. With An Account how he was at last as strangely deliver'd by Pyrates. Written by Himself.
- Language: English
- Genre: Adventure, historical fiction
- Set in: England, the Caribbean and the Pyrenees, 1651–1687
- Publisher: William Taylor
- Publication date: 25 April 1719 (307 years ago)
- Publication place: Great Britain
- Dewey Decimal: 823.51
- LC Class: PR3403 .A1
- Followed by: The Farther Adventures of Robinson Crusoe
- Text: Robinson Crusoe at Wikisource

Robinson Crusoe (Note: Full title: The Life and Strange Surprizing Adventures of Robinson Crusoe, of York, Mariner: Who lived Eight and Twenty Years, all alone in an un-inhabited Island on the Coast of America, near the Mouth of the Great River of Oroonoque; Having been cast on Shore by Shipwreck, wherein all the Men perished but himself. With An Account how he was at last as strangely deliver'd by Pyrates. Written by Himself.) (/ˈkruːsoʊ, -zoʊ/, KROO-soh, zoh) is an English adventure novel by Daniel Defoe, first published on 25 April 1719. It is often credited as marking the beginning of realistic fiction as a literary genre in the English language, and has been described as the first novel in English – although this label is disputed.

Written with a combination of epistolary, confessional, and didactic forms, the book follows the title character (born Robinson Kreutznaer) after he is cast away and spends 28 years on a remote tropical desert island near the coasts of Venezuela and Trinidad, encountering cannibals, captives, and mutineers before being rescued. The story has been thought to be based on the life of Alexander Selkirk, a Scottish castaway who lived for four years on a Pacific island called "Más a Tierra" (now part of Chile) which was renamed Robinson Crusoe Island in 1966. Pedro Serrano is another real-life castaway whose story might have inspired the novel.

The first edition credited the work's protagonist Robinson Crusoe as its author, leading many readers to believe he was a real person and that the book was a non-fiction travelogue. Despite its simple narrative style, Robinson Crusoe was well received in the literary world.

Before the end of 1719, the book had already run through four editions, and it has gone on to become one of the most widely published books in history, spawning so many imitations, not only in literature but also in film, television, and radio, that its name is used to define a genre, the Robinsonade.

== Plot summary ==
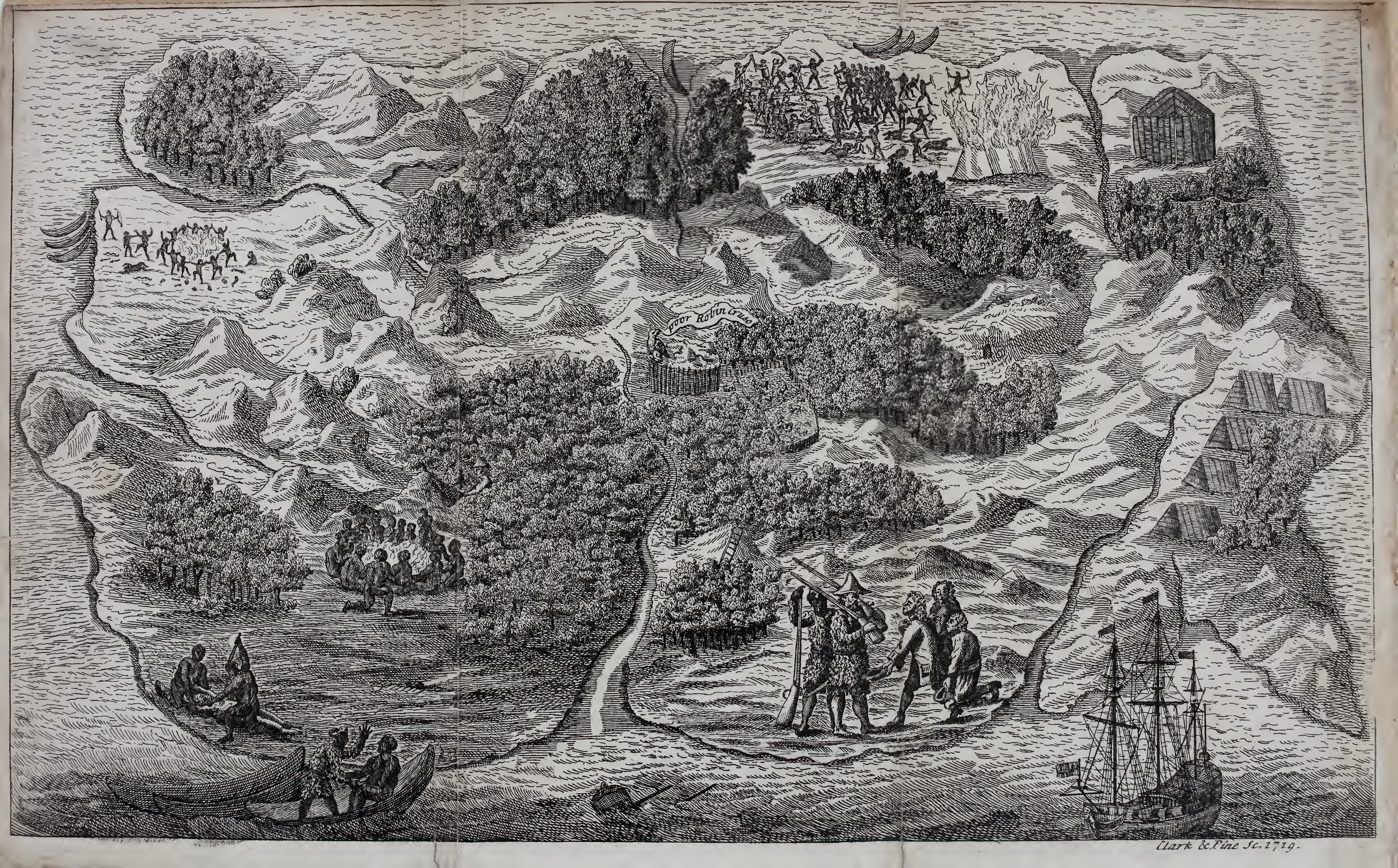
Pictorial map of Crusoe's island, the "Island of Despair", showing incidents from the book

Robinson Crusoe (the family name coming from the German name "Kreutznaer") sets sail from Kingston upon Hull, England, on a sea voyage in August 1651, against the wishes of his parents, who wanted him to pursue a career in law. After a tumultuous journey where his ship is wrecked in a storm, his desire for the sea remains so strong that he sets out to sea again. This journey, too, ends in disaster, as the ship is taken over by Salé pirates (the Salé Rovers) and Crusoe is enslaved by a Moor. Two years later, he escapes in a boat with a boy named Xury; a captain of a Portuguese ship off the west coast of Africa rescues him. The ship is en route to Brazil. Crusoe sells Xury to the captain. With the captain's help, Crusoe procures a plantation in Brazil.

Years later, Crusoe joins an expedition to purchase slaves from Africa but the ship gets blown off course in a storm about forty miles out to sea and runs aground on the sandbar of an island off the Venezuelan coast (which he calls the Island of Despair) near the mouth of the Orinoco River on 30 September 1659. The crew lowers the jolly boat, but it gets swamped by a tidal wave, drowning the crew, but leaving Crusoe the sole human survivor. He observes the latitude as 9 degrees and 22 minutes north. He sees penguins and seals on this island. Aside from Crusoe, the captain's dog and two cats survive the shipwreck. Overcoming his despair, he fetches arms, tools and other supplies from the ship before the next storm breaks it apart. He builds a fenced-in habitat near a cave which he excavates. By making marks in a wooden cross, he creates a calendar post to keep track of his time on the island. Over the years, by using tools salvaged from the ship, and some which he makes himself, he hunts animals, grows barley and rice, dries grapes to make raisins, learns to make pottery and traps and raises goats. He also adopts a small parrot. He reads the Bible and becomes religious, thanking God for his fate in which nothing is missing but human society. He also builds two boats: a large dugout canoe that he intends to use to sail to the mainland, but ends up being too large and too far from water to launch, and a smaller boat that he uses to explore the coast of the island.

More years pass and Crusoe discovers cannibals, who occasionally visit the island to kill and eat prisoners. Alarmed at this, he conserves the ammunition he'd used for hunting (running low at that point) for defence and fortifies his home in case the cannibals discover his presence on the island. He plans to kill them for committing an abomination, but later realizes he has no right to do so, as the cannibals do not knowingly commit a crime. One day, Crusoe finds that a Spanish galleon has run aground on the island during a storm, but his hopes for rescue are dashed when he discovers that the crew abandoned the ship. Nevertheless, the abandoned galleon's untouched supplies of food and ammunition, along with the ship's dog, add to Crusoe's reserves. Every night, he dreams of obtaining one or two servants by freeing some prisoners; during the cannibals' next visit to the island, when a prisoner escapes, Crusoe helps him, naming his new companion "Friday" after the day of the week he appeared. Crusoe teaches Friday the English language and converts him to Christianity.

Crusoe soon learns from Friday that the crew from the shipwrecked galleon he'd found had escaped to the mainland and are now living with Friday's tribe. Seeing renewed hope for rescue and with Friday's help, Crusoe builds another, but smaller, dugout canoe for a renewed plan to sail to the mainland. After more cannibals arrive to partake in a feast, Crusoe and Friday kill most of them and save two prisoners. One is Friday's father and the other is a Spaniard, who informs Crusoe about the other Spaniards shipwrecked on the mainland. A plan is devised wherein the Spaniard would return to the mainland with Friday's father and bring back the others, build a ship, and sail to a Spanish port.

Before the Spaniards return, an English ship appears; the sailors have staged a mutiny against their captain and intend to leave him and those still loyal to him on the island. Crusoe and the ship's captain strike a deal in which Crusoe helps the captain and the loyal sailors retake the ship. With their ringleader executed by the captain, the mutineers take up Crusoe's offer to remain on the island rather than being returned to England as prisoners to be hanged. Before embarking for England, Crusoe shows the mutineers how he survived on the island and states that the Spaniards will be coming.

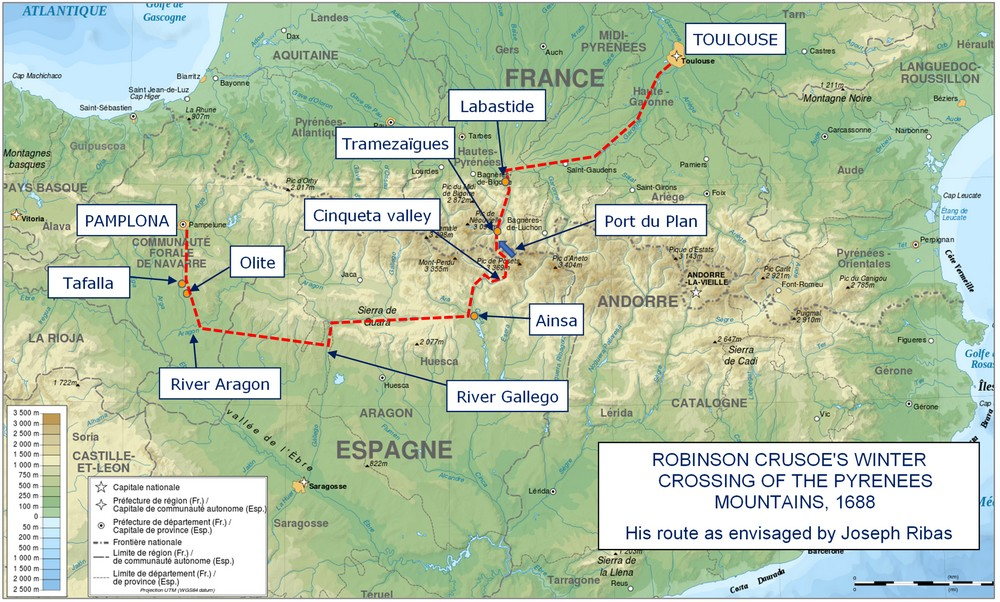
The route taken by Robinson Crusoe over the Pyrenees mountains in chapters 19 and 20 of Defoe's novel, as envisaged by Joseph Ribas

Crusoe leaves the island on 19 December 1686 and arrives in England on 11 June 1687. He learns that his family believed him dead; as a result, he was left nothing in his father's will. Crusoe departs for Lisbon to reclaim the profits of his estate in Brazil, which has granted him much wealth. In conclusion, he transports his wealth overland to England from Portugal to avoid travelling by sea. Friday accompanies him and, en route, they endure one last adventure together as they fight off famished wolves while crossing the Pyrenees.

== Characters ==
- Robinson Crusoe: The narrator of the novel, who gets shipwrecked.
- Friday: A native Caribbean whom Crusoe saves from cannibalism, and subsequently names "Friday". He becomes a servant and friend to Crusoe.
- Xury: Servant to Crusoe after they escape slavery from the Captain of the Rover together. He is later given to the Portuguese Sea Captain as an indentured servant.
- The Widow: Friend to Crusoe who looks over his assets while he is away.
- Portuguese Sea Captain: Rescues Crusoe after he escapes from slavery. Later helps him with his money and plantation.
- The Spaniard: A man rescued by Crusoe and Friday from the cannibals who later helps them escape the island.
- Friday's father: rescued by Crusoe and Friday at the same time as the Spaniard.
- Robinson Crusoe's father: A merchant named Kreutznaer.
- Captain of the Rover: Moorish pirate of Sallee who captures and enslaves Crusoe.
- Traitorous crew members: members of a mutinied ship who appear towards the end of the novel
- The Savages: Cannibals that come to Crusoe's Island and who represent a threat to Crusoe's religious and moral convictions as well as his own safety.

== Sources and real-life castaways ==
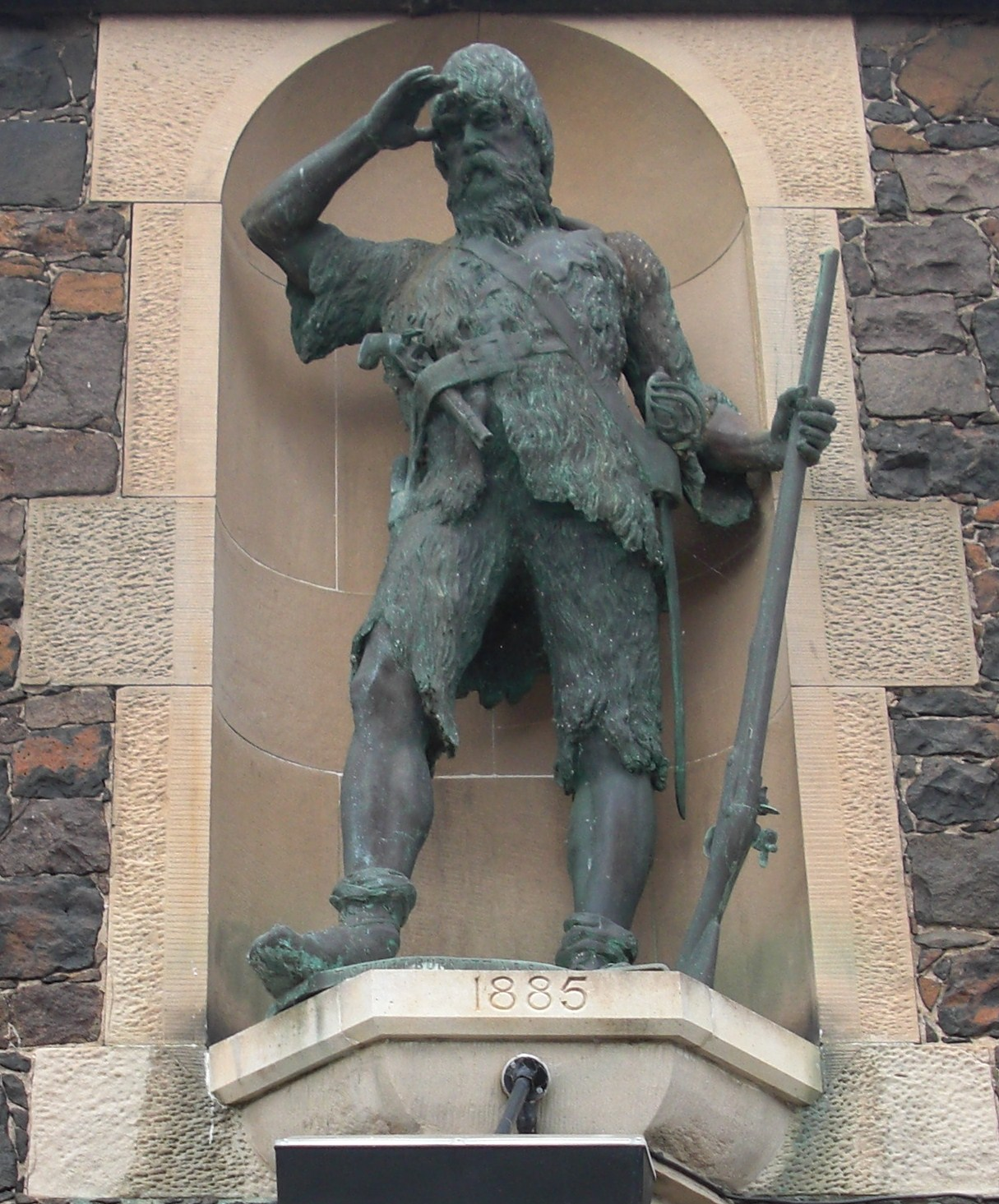
Statue of Robinson Crusoe at Alexander Selkirk's birthplace of Lower Largo in Scotland, by Thomas Stuart Burnett

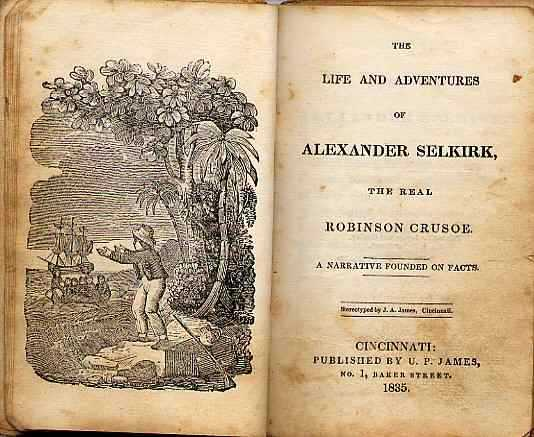
Book on Alexander Selkirk

There were many stories of real-life castaways in Defoe's time. Most famously, Defoe's suspected inspiration for Robinson Crusoe is thought to be Scottish sailor Alexander Selkirk, who spent four years on the uninhabited island of Más a Tierra (renamed Robinson Crusoe Island in 1966) in the Juan Fernández Islands off the Chilean coast. Selkirk was rescued in 1709 by Woodes Rogers during a British expedition that led to the publication of Selkirk's adventures in both A Voyage to the South Sea, and Round the World and A Cruising Voyage Around the World in 1712. Tim Severin notes that Defoe neither confirmed nor denied Selkirk's role as a possible model for the book.

According to Andrew Lambert, author of Crusoe's Island, it is a "false premise" to suppose that Defoe's novel was inspired by the experiences of a single person such as Selkirk, because the story is "a complex compound of all the other buccaneer survival stories." However, Robinson Crusoe is far from a copy of Rogers' account: Becky Little argues three events that distinguish the two stories:

1. Robinson Crusoe was shipwrecked while Selkirk decided to leave his ship, thus marooning himself;
2. The island that Crusoe was shipwrecked on had already been inhabited, unlike the solitary nature of Selkirk's adventures.
3. The last and most crucial difference between the two stories is that Selkirk was a privateer, looting and raiding coastal cities during the War of Spanish Succession.

"The economic and dynamic thrust of the book is completely alien to what the buccaneers are doing," Lambert says. "The buccaneers just want to capture some loot and come home and drink it all, and Crusoe isn't doing that at all. He's an economic imperialist: He's creating a world of trade and profit."

Other possible sources for the narrative include Ibn Tufail's Hayy ibn Yaqdhan, and Spanish sixteenth-century sailor Pedro Serrano. Ibn Tufail's Hayy ibn Yaqdhan is a twelfth-century philosophical novel also set on a desert island, and translated from Arabic into Latin and English a number of times in the half-century preceding Defoe's novel.

Pedro Luis Serrano was a Spanish sailor who was marooned for seven or eight years on a small desert island after shipwrecking in the 1520s on a small island in the Caribbean off the coast of Nicaragua. He had no access to fresh water and lived off the blood and flesh of sea turtles and birds. He was quite a celebrity when he returned to Europe; before dying, he recorded the hardships suffered in documents that show the endless anguish and suffering, the product of absolute abandonment to his fate, now held in the General Archive of the Indies, in Seville. It is quite possible that Defoe heard his story in one of his visits to Spain before becoming a writer.

Yet another source for Defoe's novel may have been the Robert Knox account of his abduction by the King of Ceylon Rajasinha II of Kandy in 1659 in An Historical Relation of the Island Ceylon.

Severin (2002) unravels a much wider range of potential sources of inspiration, and concludes by identifying castaway surgeon Henry Pitman as the most likely:

An employee of the Duke of Monmouth, Pitman played a part in the Monmouth Rebellion. His short book about his desperate escape from a Caribbean penal colony, followed by his shipwrecking and subsequent desert island misadventures, was published by John Taylor of Paternoster Row, London, whose son William Taylor later published Defoe's novel.

Severin argues that since Pitman appears to have lived in the lodgings above the father's publishing house and that Defoe himself was a mercer in the area at the time, Defoe may have met Pitman in person and learned of his experiences first-hand, or possibly through submission of a draft. Severin also discusses another publicized case of a marooned man named only as Will, of the Miskito people of Central America, who may have led to the depiction of Friday.

Secord (1963) analyses the composition of Robinson Crusoe and gives a list of possible sources of the story, rejecting the common theory that the story of Selkirk is Defoe's only source.

== Reception and sequels ==
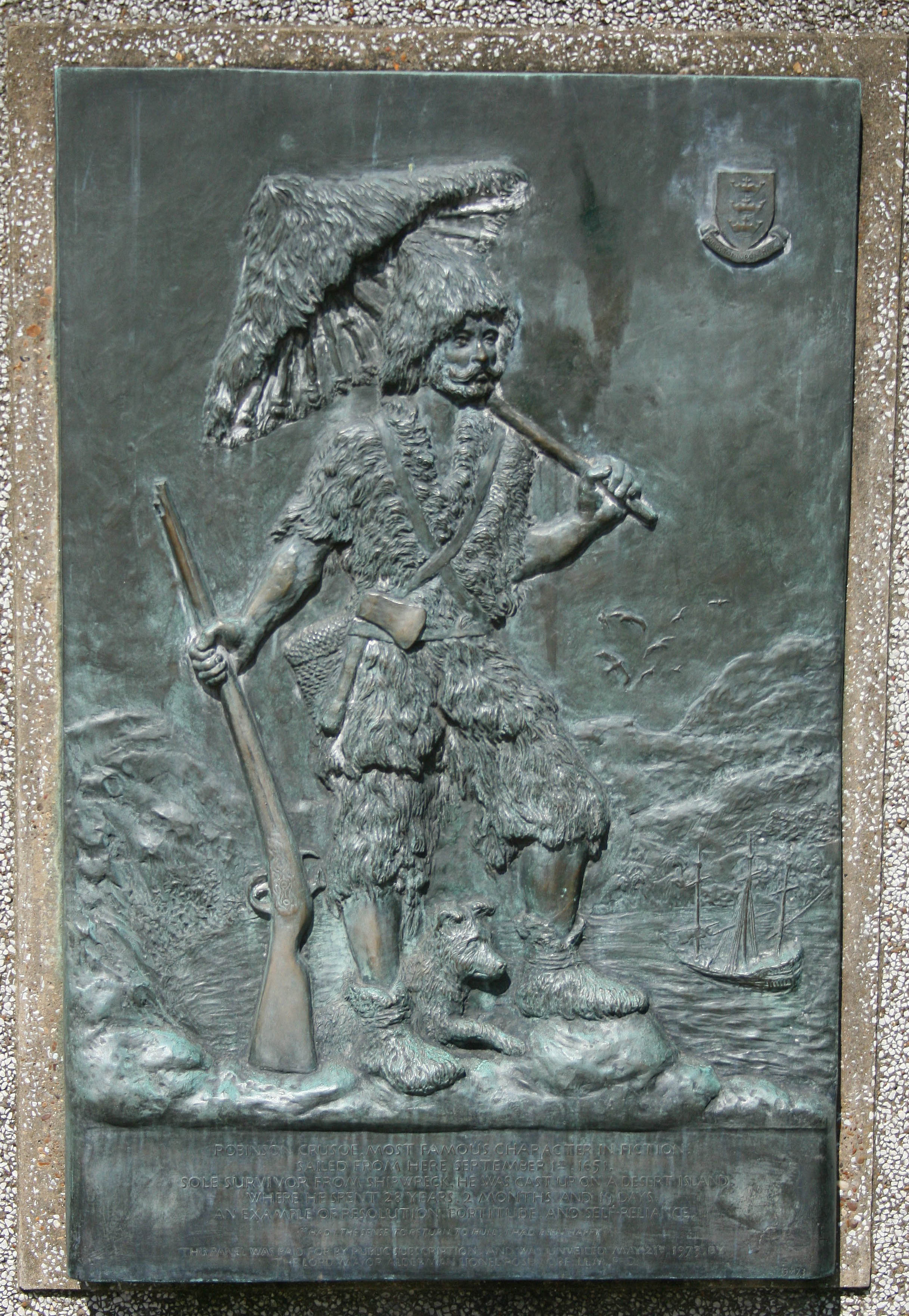
Plaque in Queen's Gardens, Hull, showing him on his island

The book was published on 25 April 1719. Before the end of the year, this first volume had run through four editions.

By the end of the nineteenth century, no book in the history of Western literature had more editions, spin-offs, and translations (even into languages such as Inuktitut, Coptic, and Maltese) than Robinson Crusoe, with more than 700 such alternative versions, including children's versions with pictures and no text.

The term "Robinsonade" was coined to describe the genre of stories similar to Robinson Crusoe.

Defoe went on to write a lesser-known sequel, The Farther Adventures of Robinson Crusoe (1719). It was intended to be the last part of his stories, according to the original title page of the sequel's first edition, but a third book was published (1720), Serious Reflections During the Life and Surprising Adventures of Robinson Crusoe: With his Vision of the Angelick World.

== Interpretations of the novel ==
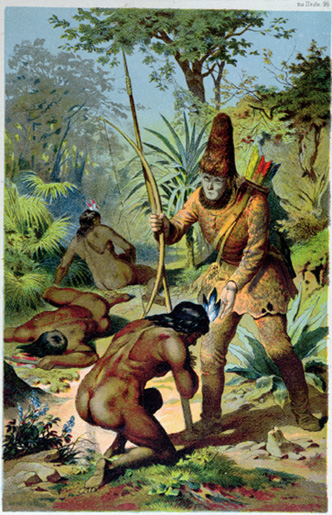
Crusoe standing over Friday after he frees him from the cannibals, illustration by Carl Offterdinger

"He is the true prototype of the British colonist. ... The whole Anglo-Saxon spirit in Crusoe: the manly independence, the unconscious cruelty, the persistence, the slow yet efficient intelligence, the sexual apathy, the calculating taciturnity."

— Irish novelist James Joyce

The novel has been subject to numerous analyses and interpretations since its publication. In a sense, Crusoe attempts to replicate his society on the island. This is achieved through the use of European technology, agriculture and even a rudimentary political hierarchy. Several times in the novel Crusoe refers to himself as the "king" of the island, while the captain describes him as the "governor" to the mutineers. At the very end of the novel the island is referred to as a "colony". The idealized master-servant relationship Defoe depicts between Crusoe and Friday can also be seen in terms of cultural assimilation, with Crusoe representing the "enlightened" European while Friday is the "savage" who can only be redeemed from his cultural manners through assimilation into Crusoe's culture. Nonetheless, Defoe used Friday to criticize the Spanish colonization of the Americas.

According to J.P. Hunter, Robinson is not a hero but an everyman. He begins as a wanderer, aimless on a sea he does not understand, and ends as a pilgrim, crossing a final mountain to enter the promised land. The book tells the story of how Robinson becomes closer to God, not through listening to sermons in a church but through spending time alone amongst nature with only a Bible to read.

Conversely, cultural critic and literary scholar Michael Gurnow views the novel from a Rousseauian perspective: The central character's movement from a primitive state to a more civilized one is interpreted as Crusoe's denial of humanity's state of nature.

Robinson Crusoe is filled with religious aspects. Defoe was a Puritan moralist and normally worked in the guide tradition, writing books on how to be a good Puritan Christian, such as The New Family Instructor (1727) and Religious Courtship (1722). While Robinson Crusoe is far more than a guide, it shares many of the themes and theological and moral points of view.

"Crusoe" may have been taken from Timothy Cruso, a classmate of Defoe's who had written guide books, including God the Guide of Youth (1695), before dying at an early age – just eight years before Defoe wrote Robinson Crusoe. Cruso would have been remembered by contemporaries and the association with guide books is clear. It has even been speculated that God the Guide of Youth inspired Robinson Crusoe because of a number of passages in that work that are closely tied to the novel. A leitmotif of the novel is the Christian notion of providence, penitence, and redemption. Crusoe comes to repent of the follies of his youth. Defoe also foregrounds this theme by arranging highly significant events in the novel to occur on Crusoe's birthday. The denouement culminates not only in Crusoe's deliverance from the island, but his spiritual deliverance, his acceptance of Christian doctrine, and in his intuition of his own salvation.

When confronted with the cannibals, Crusoe wrestles with the problem of cultural relativism. Despite his disgust, he feels unjustified in holding the natives morally responsible for a practice so deeply ingrained in their culture. Nevertheless, he retains his belief in an absolute standard of morality; he regards cannibalism as a "national crime" and forbids Friday from practising it.

=== Economics and civilization ===
In classical, neoclassical and Austrian economics, Crusoe is regularly used to illustrate the theory of production and choice in the absence of trade, money, and prices. Crusoe must allocate effort between production and leisure and must choose between alternative production possibilities to meet his needs. The arrival of Friday is then used to illustrate the possibility of trade and the gains that result.

One day, about noon, going towards my boat, I was exceedingly surprised with the print of a man's naked foot on the shore, which was very plain to be seen on the sand.

— Defoe's Robinson Crusoe, 1719

The work has been variously read as an allegory for the development of civilization; as a manifesto of economic individualism; and as an expression of European colonial desires. While the novel reflects the time when British colonialism was underway, and Britain's profit-oriented colonial economy, dependent on African slave labor, was thriving, it depicts the relationship between colonizer and colonized in ambivalent terms, with Friday's mimicry and hybridity unsettling Crusoe's authority and opening a space for cultural negotiation. Far from being a simple narrative of imagined European superiority, it reveals the fragility and complexity of colonial discourses.

The book also illustrates the strength of Defoe's religious convictions, showing the importance of repentance in his view. Critic M.E. Novak supports the connection between the religious and economic themes within Robinson Crusoe, citing Defoe's religious ideology as the influence for his portrayal of Crusoe's economic ideals, and his support of the individual. Novak cites Ian Watt's extensive research which explores the impact that several Romantic Era novels had against economic individualism, and the reversal of those ideals that takes place within Robinson Crusoe.

In Tess Lewis's review, "The heroes we deserve", of Ian Watt's article, she furthers Watt's argument with a development on Defoe's intention as an author, "to use individualism to signify nonconformity in religion and the admirable qualities of self-reliance". This further supports the belief that Defoe used aspects of spiritual autobiography to introduce the benefits of individualism to a not entirely convinced religious community. J. Paul Hunter has written extensively on the subject of Robinson Crusoe as apparent spiritual autobiography, tracing the influence of Defoe's Puritan ideology through Crusoe's narrative, and his acknowledgement of human imperfection in pursuit of meaningful spiritual engagements – the cycle of "repentance [and] deliverance".

This spiritual pattern and its episodic nature, as well as the re-discovery of earlier female novelists, have kept Robinson Crusoe from being classified as a novel, let alone the first novel written in English – despite the blurbs on some book covers. Early critics, such as Robert Louis Stevenson, admired it, saying that the footprint scene in Crusoe was one of the four greatest in English literature and most unforgettable; more prosaically, Wesley Vernon has seen the origins of forensic podiatry in this episode. It has inspired a new genre, the Robinsonade, as works such as Johann David Wyss' The Swiss Family Robinson (1812) adapt its premise and has provoked modern postcolonial responses, including J. M. Coetzee's Foe (1986) and Michel Tournier's Vendredi ou les Limbes du Pacifique (in English, Friday, or, The Other Island) (1967). Two sequels followed: Defoe's The Farther Adventures of Robinson Crusoe (1719) and his Serious Reflections of Robinson Crusoe (1720). Jonathan Swift's Gulliver's Travels (1726) is in part a parody of Defoe's adventure novel.

== Legacy ==
=== Influence on language ===
The book proved to be so popular that the names of the two main protagonists, Crusoe and Friday, have entered the language. During World War II, people who decided to stay and hide in the ruins of the German-occupied city of Warsaw for a period of three winter months, from October to January 1945, when they were rescued by the Red Army, were later called Robinson Crusoes of Warsaw (Robinsonowie warszawscy). Robinson Crusoe usually referred to his servant as "my man Friday", from which the term "Man Friday" (or "Girl Friday") originated.

=== Influence on literature ===
Robinson Crusoe marked the beginning of realistic fiction as a literary genre. Its success led to many imitators; and castaway novels, written by Ambrose Evans, Penelope Aubin, and others, became quite popular in Europe in the 18th and early 19th centuries. Most of these have fallen into obscurity, but some became established, including The Swiss Family Robinson, which borrowed Crusoe's first name for its title.

Jonathan Swift's Gulliver's Travels, published seven years after Robinson Crusoe, may be read as a systematic rebuttal of Defoe's optimistic account of human capability. In The Unthinkable Swift: The Spontaneous Philosophy of a Church of England Man, Warren Montag argues that Swift was concerned about refuting the notion that the individual precedes society, as Defoe's novel seems to suggest. In Treasure Island, author Robert Louis Stevenson parodies Crusoe with the character of Ben Gunn, a friendly castaway who was marooned for many years, has a wild appearance, dresses entirely in goat skin, and constantly talks about providence.

Widely translated, the novel swiftly became influential beyond Britain. In Jean-Jacques Rousseau's treatise on education, Emile, or on Education, the one book the protagonist is allowed to read before the age of twelve is Robinson Crusoe. Rousseau wants Emile to identify with Crusoe so he can rely upon himself for all of his needs. In Rousseau's view, Emile needs to imitate Crusoe's experience, allowing necessity to determine what is to be learned and accomplished. This is one of the main themes of Rousseau's educational model. Two adaptations of Robinson Crusoe, published in a single volume and translated into Icelandic from Danish, were among the first secular literature ever printed in Iceland.

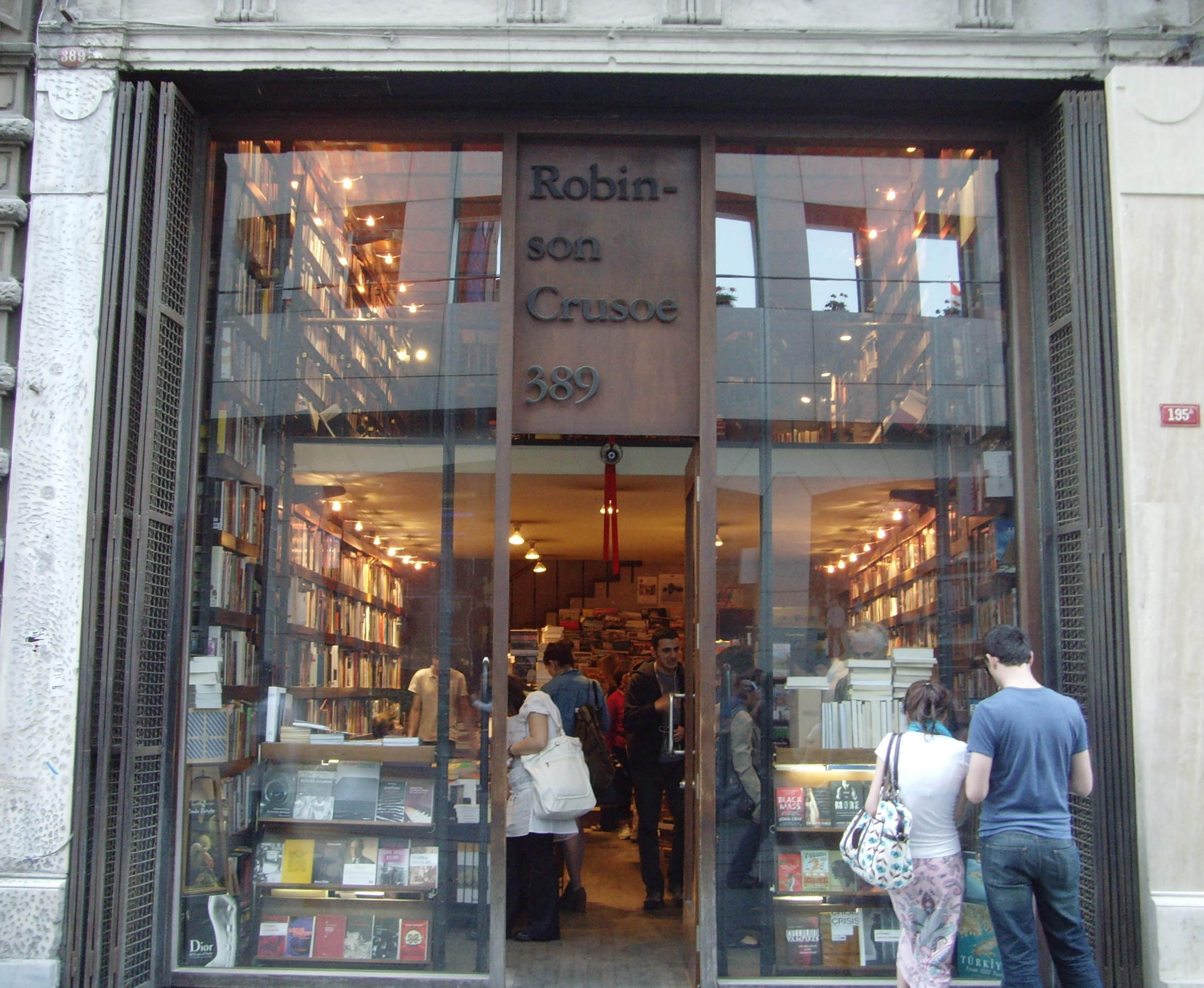
Robinson Crusoe bookstore on İstiklal Avenue, Istanbul

In The Tale of Little Pig Robinson, Beatrix Potter directs the reader to Robinson Crusoe for a detailed description of the island (the land of the Bong tree) to which her eponymous hero moves. In Wilkie Collins' most popular novel, The Moonstone, one of the chief characters and narrators, Gabriel Betteredge, has faith in all that Robinson Crusoe says and uses the book for a sort of divination. He considers The Adventures of Robinson Crusoe the finest book ever written, reads it over and over again, and considers a man but poorly read if he had happened not to read the book.

French novelist Michel Tournier published Friday, or, The Other Island (French Vendredi ou les Limbes du Pacifique) in 1967. His novel explores themes including civilization versus nature, the psychology of solitude, as well as death and sexuality in a retelling of Defoe's Robinson Crusoe story. Tournier's Robinson chooses to remain on the island, rejecting civilization when offered the chance to escape 28 years after being shipwrecked. Likewise, in 1963, J. M. G. Le Clézio, winner of the 2008 Nobel Prize in Literature, published the novel Le Proces-Verbal. The book's epigraph is a quote from Robinson Crusoe, and like Crusoe, the novel's protagonist Adam Pollo suffers long periods of loneliness.

"Crusoe in England", a 183 line poem by Elizabeth Bishop, imagines Crusoe near the end of his life, recalling his time of exile with a mixture of bemusement and regret.

J. M. Coetzee's 1986 novel Foe recounts the tale of Robinson Crusoe from the perspective of a woman named Susan Barton.

Other stories that share similar themes to Robinson Crusoe include William Golding's Lord of the Flies (1954), J. G. Ballard's Concrete Island (1974), and Andy Weir's The Martian (2011).

==== Inverted Crusoeism ====
The term "inverted Crusoeism" was coined by J. G. Ballard. The paradigm of Robinson Crusoe has been a recurring topic in Ballard's work. Whereas the original Robinson Crusoe became a castaway against his own will, Ballard's protagonists often choose to maroon themselves; hence inverted Crusoeism (e.g., Concrete Island). The concept provides a reason as to why people would deliberately maroon themselves on a remote island; in Ballard's work, becoming a castaway is as much a healing and empowering process as an entrapping one, enabling people to discover a more meaningful and vital existence.

=== Comic strip adaptations ===
The story was also illustrated and published in comic book form by Classics Illustrated in 1943 and 1957. The much improved 1957 version was inked / penciled by Sam Citron, who is most well known for his contributions to the earlier issues of Superman. British illustrator Reginald Ben Davis drew a female version of the story titled Jill Crusoe, Castaway (1950–1959).

Bob Mankoff, cartoon editor of The New Yorker attributes the genre of desert island cartoons, which began appearing in the publication in the 1930s, to the popularity of Robinson Crusoe.

=== Stage adaptations ===
A pantomime version of Robinson Crusoe was staged at the Theatre Royal, Drury Lane, in 1796, with Joseph Grimaldi as Pierrot in the harlequinade. The piece was produced again in 1798, this time starring Grimaldi as Clown. In 1815, Grimaldi played Friday in another version of Robinson Crusoe.

Jacques Offenbach wrote an opéra comique called Robinson Crusoé, which was first performed at the Opéra-Comique in Paris on 23 November 1867. This was based on the British pantomime version rather than the novel itself. The libretto was by Eugène Cormon and Hector-Jonathan Crémieux.

There have been a number of other stage adaptations, including those by Isaac Pocock, Jim Helsinger and Steve Shaw and a musical by Victor Prince.

=== Film adaptations ===
The first film adaptation was produced and directed by Georges Méliès in 1902. It was followed by another silent film adaptation in 1927.

The Soviet 3D film Robinson Crusoe was produced in 1947. Luis Buñuel directed Robinson Crusoe starring Dan O'Herlihy, which was released in 1954.

In 1968, American writer/director Ralph C. Bluemke made a family-friendly version of the story titled Robby, in which the main characters are portrayed as children. It stars Warren Raum as Robby (Robinson Crusoe) and Ryp Siani as Friday.

Peter O'Toole and Richard Roundtree co-star in the 1975 film Man Friday, which sardonically portrays Crusoe as incapable of seeing his dark-skinned companion as anything but an inferior creature, while Friday is more enlightened and sympathetic.

In 1981, Czechoslovak director and animator Stanislav Látal made a version of the story under the name Adventures of Robinson Crusoe, a Sailor from York combining traditional and stop-motion animation. The movie was coproduced by regional West Germany broadcaster Südwestfunk Baden-Baden.

In 1988, Aidan Quinn portrayed Robinson Crusoe in the film Crusoe. The 1997 film Robinson Crusoe stars Pierce Brosnan and received limited commercial success.

In 2023, Oriana Ikomo portrayed Robinson Crusoe in the Dutch language film The Life and Strange Surprising Adventures of Robinson Crusoe Who Lived for Twenty and Eight Years All Alone on an Inhabited Island and Said It Was His. The film satirizes the colonial myth that a white man could "civilize" the indigenous inhabitants of an island, while claiming the territory as his own.

Films inspired by Robinson Crusoe without being direct adaptations include:

- The 1932 film Mr. Robinson Crusoe, produced by and starring Douglas Fairbanks. It was directed by Eddie Sutherland. Set in Tahiti, the film depicts Steve Drexel, an adventurer, trying to survive on a desert island for almost a year.
- Miss Robin Crusoe (1954), features a female castaway played by Amanda Blake and a female Friday.
- Robinson Crusoe on Mars (1965) starring Paul Mantee, has an alien Friday portrayed by Victor Lundin and an added character played by Adam West.
- The 1966 Walt Disney film Lt. Robin Crusoe, U.S.N., starring Dick Van Dyke is a comedy, with a beautiful woman taking the place of Friday and named "Wednesday".
- The 2000 film Cast Away, with Tom Hanks as a FedEx employee stranded on an island for many years, also borrows much from the Robinson Crusoe story.

=== Animated adaptations ===
In 1988, an animated cartoon for children called Classic Adventure Stories Robinson Crusoe was released. Crusoe's early sea travels are simplified, as his ship outruns the Salé Rovers pirates but then gets wrecked in a storm.

And then in 1995 the BBC first aired the series Robinson Sucroe until 1998, with The Children's Channel and Pop repeating it.

=== Radio adaptations ===
Daniel Defoe – Robinson Crusoe was adapted as a two-part play for BBC radio. Dramatised by Steve Chambers and directed by Marion Nancarrow, and starring Roy Marsden and Tom Bevan, it was first broadcast on BBC Radio 4 in May 1998. It was subsequently rebroadcast on BBC Radio 4 Extra in February 2023.

=== TV adaptations ===
In 1964, a French film production crew made a 13-part serial of The Adventures of Robinson Crusoe. It starred Robert Hoffmann. The black-and-white series was dubbed into English and German. In the UK, the BBC broadcast it on numerous occasions between 1965 and 1977.

The 2008–2009 Crusoe TV series was a 13-part show created by Stephen Gallagher.

Two 2000s reality television series, Expedition Robinson and Survivor, have their contestants try to survive on an isolated location, usually an island. The concept is influenced by Robinson Crusoe.

== Editions ==
- The life and strange surprizing adventures of Robinson Crusoe: of York, mariner: who lived twenty eight years all alone in an un-inhabited island on the coast of America, near the mouth of the great river of Oroonoque; ... Written by himself., Early English Books Online, 1719. Defoe, Daniel (January 2007). "1719 text". Oxford Text Archive. hdl:20.500.14106/K061280.000.
- Robinson Crusoe, Oneworld Classics 2008. ISBN 978-1-84749-012-4
- Robinson Crusoe, Penguin Classics 2003. ISBN 978-0-14-143982-2
- Robinson Crusoe, Oxford World's Classics 2007. ISBN 978-0-19-283342-6
- Robinson Crusoe, Bantam Classics
- Defoe, Daniel Robinson Crusoe, edited by Michael Shinagel (New York: Norton, 1994), ISBN 978-0393964523. Includes a selection of critical essays.
- Defoe, Daniel. Robinson Crusoe. Dover Publications, 1998.
- Defoe, Daniel. Robinson Crusoe. Signet Classic 1961 with afterword by Harvey Swados
- Life and Adventures of Robinson Crusoe Rand McNally & Company. The Windermere Series 1916. No ISBN. Includes 7 illustrations by Milo Winter

== See also ==
- Cannibalism in literature
- Cannibalism in the Americas

=== In real life ===
- Alexander Selkirk
- Crusoe Cave
- Leendert Hasenbosch
- Philip Ashton

=== Novels ===
- The Swiss Family Robinson

=== Television and films ===
- Cast Away
- Crusoe
- Gilligan's Island
- Lost
- Miss Robinson Crusoe
- Robby
- Seven Sea Pirates

== Additional references ==
- Boz (Charles Dickens) (1853). Memoirs of Joseph Grimaldi. London: G. Routledge & Co.
- Findlater, Richard (1955). Grimaldi King of Clowns. London: Magibbon & Kee. OCLC 558202542.
- Frank, Katherine (2012). "Crusoe: Daniel Defoe, Robert Knox and the Creation of a Myth". Pimlico
- Malabou, Catherine "To Quarantine from Quarantine: Rousseau, Robinson Crusoe, and 'I.'" Critical Inquiry, vol. 47, no. S2, 2021, https://doi.org/10.1086/711426.
- McConnell Stott, Andrew (2009). The Pantomime Life of Joseph Grimaldi. Edinburgh: Canongate Books Ltd. ISBN 978-1-84767-761-7.
- Ross, Angus, ed. (1965), Robinson Crusoe. Penguin.
- Secord, Arthur Wellesley (1963). Studies in the Narrative Method of Defoe. New York: Russell & Russell. (First published in 1924.)
- Shinagel, Michael, ed. (1994). Robinson Crusoe. Norton Critical Edition. ISBN 0-393-96452-3. Includes textual annotations, contemporary and modern criticisms, bibliography.
- Severin, Tim (2002). In search of Robinson Crusoe, New York: Basic Books. ISBN 0-465-07698-X
- Hymer, Stephen (September 1971). "Robinson Crusoe and the secret of primitive accumulation". Monthly Review. 23 (4): 11. doi:10.14452/MR-023-04-1971-08_2.
- Shinagel, Michael, ed. (1994), Robinson Crusoe. Norton Critical Edition (ISBN 0-393-96452-3). By Kogul, Mariapan.

=== Literary criticism ===
- Backscheider, Paula Daniel Defoe: His Life (Baltimore: Johns Hopkins University Press, 1989). ISBN 0801845122.
- Ewers, Chris Mobility in the English Novel from Defoe to Austen. (Woodbridge: Boydell and Brewer, 2018). ISBN 978-1787442726. Includes a chapter on Robinson Crusoe.
- Richetti, John (ed.) The Cambridge Companion to Daniel Defoe. (Cambridge: Cambridge University Press, 2009) ISBN 978-0521675055. Casebook of critical essays.
- Rogers, Pat Robinson Crusoe (London: Allen and Unwin, 1979). ISBN 0048000027.
- Watt, Ian The Rise of the Novel (London: Pimlico, 2000). ISBN 978-0712664271.
