= 7 Sea Pirates =

Seven Seas Pirates
- Film poster
- Spanish: Selkirk, el verdadero Robinson Crusoe
- Directed by: Walter Tournier
- Written by: Walter Tournier, Mario Jacob and Enrique Cortés
- Production companies: Patagonik Film Group; Tournier Animation Studio; Cine Animadores
- Distributed by: Buena Vista International (through RBS Entertainment in Uruguay and Andes Films in Chile)
- Release date: 2 February 2012
- Running time: 80 minutes
- Countries: Uruguay; Argentina; Chile
- Language: Spanish
- Budget: $1,250,000
- Box office: $582,094

Seven Seas Pirates (Spanish: Selkirk, el verdadero Robinson Crusoe; lit. 'Selkirk, the real Robinson Crusoe') is a 2012 Uruguayan animated adventure film made in cooperation with Argentina and Chile. It was directed by Walter Tournier, based on a script he wrote in collaboration with Mario Jacob and Enrique Cortés and premiered on Feb. 2, 2012. It was filmed mainly with stop motion, with digital details added in post-production.

== Background ==
The story behind the film is based on an actual case in 1703, when Scottish sailor Alexander Selkirk argued with the captain of his ship and was abandoned for more than four years on a deserted island. That case, and perhaps another similar one carried out by Pedro Serrano, were sources for English writer Daniel Defoe's novel Robinson Crusoe.

== Plot ==
Selkirk, a rebellious and egotistical pirate, is the pilot of the Esperanza, an English galleon that sails the southern seas looking for treasure. Through gambling he earns the present and future savings of his companions, winning the enmity of the crew and Captain Bullock, who decides to leave him on a desert island.

== Reception ==
The critic Diego Batlle said that to the rhythm of a catchy candombe music and with a colorful visual design (even if the finish is far from Hollywood perfection) this film produced in Uruguay in an artisan form -frame by frame- delivers good doses of humor And ingenuity in developing the misadventures of the pathetic crew of the Esperanza galleon, and especially the anti-hero who will be stranded on a tropical island. Although the film welcomes the morals expected in every politically correct children's film (the egoism, greed and individualism of the protagonist will be transformed, with experience, into feelings much more noble), does not fall into the didactic and the obvious descent of line. It is worthwhile that a certain sector of the public accustomed to the frenetic pace and the spectacularity of the images of the animated productions of the North American cinema see this more than worthy Uruguayan proposal although it costs him a little accustomed to its tone, rhythm and style, because it will be a good Exercise that the children of today discover that there is another type of narrations as valuable and equally recommendable as those of the vertiginous digital images and effects in 3D.

For the critic of La Voz del Interior, this feature reminded him of the celebrated television program Caloi. The director has directed numerous shorts, one of which was chosen as a prominent film of the twentieth century by the Festival of Annecy, France, one of the most famous of the genre and one of the sources where he drank the cycle of the Black Caloi, the creator Of Clement. Using figures that could have been made with plasticine, Tournier recreates delicious details ranging from the metal of beer pints, to wooden buckets from where pirates serve rationed water when they are on the high seas, recreation of the village, Tavern, galleon and Selkirk survival techniques, such as cooking turtle eggs for lunch, using a clam as a frying pan. Despite some improvements, this work is great and excellent news for the world of Latin American animation.
