= Nora Vagi Brash =

Papua New Guinean author and playwright (1944–2024)

Nora Vagi Brash CMG OBE
- Born: 14 December 1944; Dagoda, Territory of Papua
- Died: 23 April 2024 (aged 79); Korobosea, Port Moresby, Papua New Guinea
- Education: University of Papua New Guinea
- Occupations: Author, playwright
- Spouse: Elton Thomas Brash (m. 1966; died 1998)
- Children: 7 (5 adopted)
- Relatives: Egi Vagi (mother)
- Writing career
- Language: English, Tok Pisin, Hiri Motu

Nora Vagi Brash CMG OBE (14 December 1944 – 23 April 2024) was a Papua New Guinean playwright and author. She was a laureate of the Independence Medal for her work as a playwright.

== Early life and education ==
Nora Magi Vagi was born on 14 December 1944 in Dagoda, Central Province, Papua New Guinea. She was the daughter of Egi Vagi, a London Missionary Society evangelist. After graduation from Port Moresby Teachers' College in 1965, she worked as a primary school teacher. She later also attended the University of Papua New Guinea.

== Career ==
Brash told an interviewer "I started writing when I was about seven years old. My father and grandmother had passed away and I was fascinated by their burial sites, the smell of the earth, the way the moonlight fell on the trees. I would sit by the grave and write poems." She became active in the theater, wrote scripts for puppet shows based on Papua New Guinean traditional stories, and eventually became the artistic director of the National Theatre Company, a post she held till she left for further studies at the University of Papua New Guinea in 1978.

Brash wrote plays for stage and radio in a combination of English, Tok Pisin, and Hiri Motu, satirically dealing with conflicts between urban and rural people during the modernization of the country. Her Which Way, Big Man?, first performed in 1976 by the National Theatre Company, depicts a pretentious public official and his wife giving a party to celebrate his promotion, but after he is accused of corruption it ends in a drunken brawl. Taurama (1985), a historical drama set in the 16th century, centers on Kevau Dagora, who survives an attack on his village, Taurama. It incorporates dance and traditional ritual and spiritual elements of Papua New Guinea's culture.

Her poems include the lyric poem "Song of the Winds" and she published a collection of Poems in 2011.

== Personal life and death ==
In 1966, she married Elton Thomas Brash OBE, an Australian who was vice-chancellor of the University of Papua New Guinea and international aid consultant. They had two children and adopted five. He died in 1998.

Nora Vagi Brash died at Port Moresby General Hospital on 23 April 2024, aged 79.

== Awards and honours ==
In 1985, Nora Vagi Brash was awarded the Independence Medal for her work as a playwright.

She was appointed Officer of the Order of the British Empire (OBE) in the 2007 Birthday Honours "for services to the arts and education" and appointed Companion of the Order of St Michael and St George (CMG) in the 2018 Birthday Honours "for service to the community through active promotion of local culture and heritage in her roles as author, playwright, and poet".

== Bibliography ==
- The High Cost of Living Differently: A Radio Play. (1976) Institute of Papua New Guinea Studies.
- Which Way Big Man? (1977) Institute of Papua New Guinea Studies.
- Taurama: A Play in Four Acts. Port Moresby: Owl Books.
- Black Market Buai, published in the literary magazine Ondohondo (Mid-1982): 18–22.
- Pick the Bone Dry. Ondohondo, no. 7 (1985–1986): 20–30.
- Which Way, Big Man? and Five Other Plays (1996). Oxford: Oxford University Press. Collects Which Way, Big Man?, The High Cost of Living Differently, Black Market Buai, Taurama, Pick the Bone Dry, and City Spirit (1995).
- Grandpa's Memories (1997) Oxford University Press
- Poems (2011) University of Papua New Guinea Press / Masalai Press
