= Friday (Robinson Crusoe) =

Fictional character from the 1719 novel

- Robinson Crusoe character
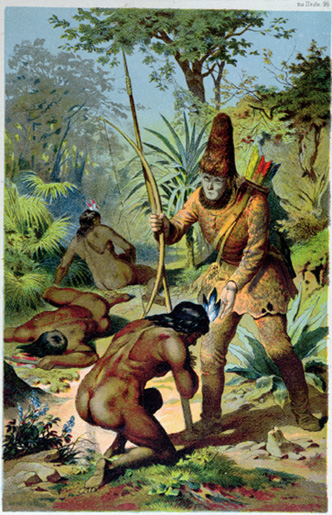
- Robinson Crusoe and Man Friday by Carl Offterdinger
- First appearance: Robinson Crusoe (1719)
- Last appearance: The Farther Adventures of Robinson Crusoe (1719)
- Created by: Daniel Defoe
- Portrayed by: Jaime Fernández; William Takaku; Tongayi Chirisa

In-universe information
- Gender: Male
- Nationality: Amerindian, possibly Naso

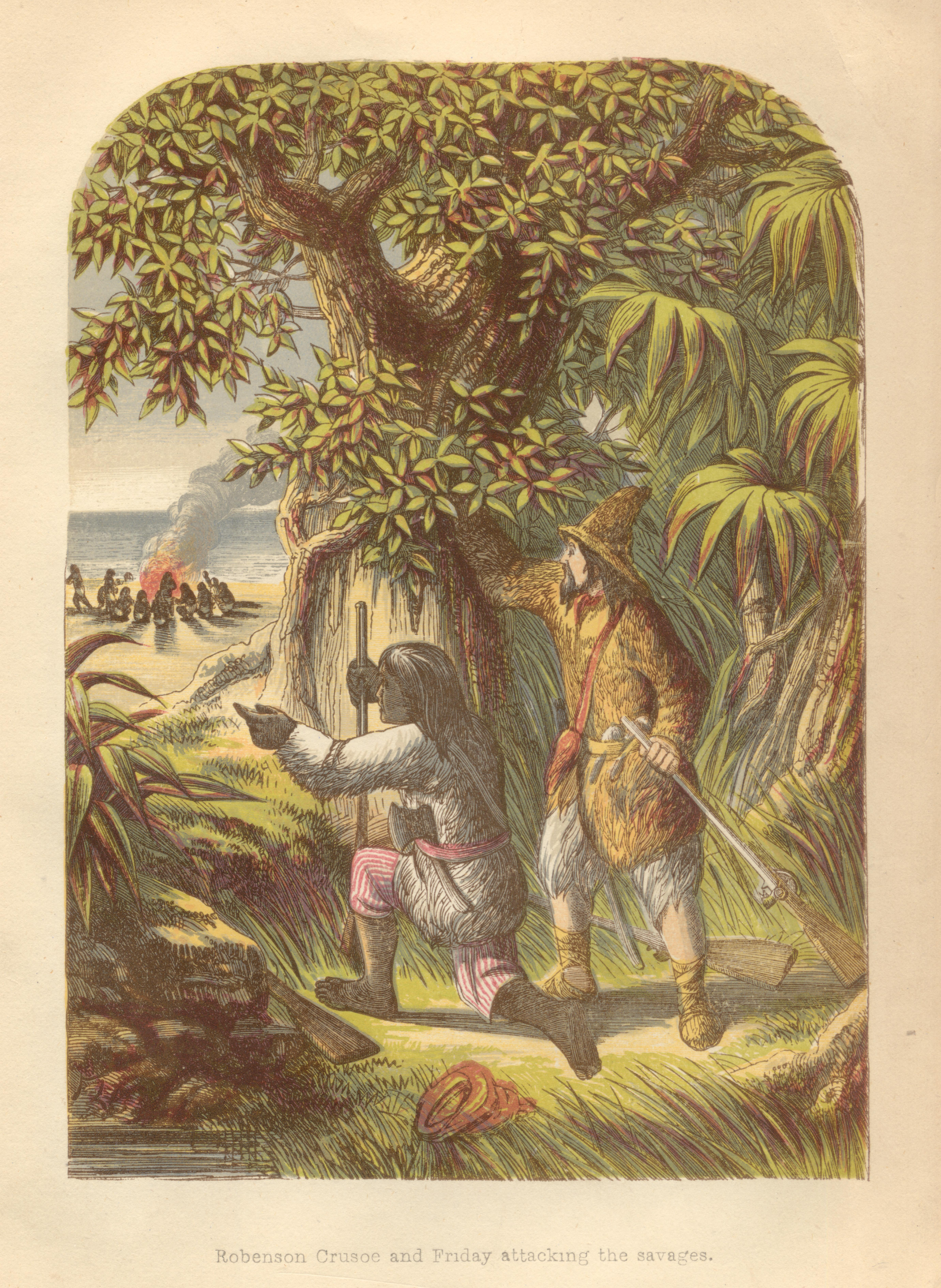
A. F. Lydon illustration, 1865: "Robinson Crusoe and Friday attacking the savages"

Friday is one of the main characters of Daniel Defoe's 1719 novel Robinson Crusoe and its sequel The Farther Adventures of Robinson Crusoe. Robinson Crusoe names the man Friday, with whom he cannot at first communicate, because they first meet on that day. The character is the source of the expression "Man Friday", used to describe a male personal assistant or servant, especially one who is particularly competent or loyal.

It is possible that a Miskito pirate by the name of Will became the inspiration for the character Friday.

== Character ==
Robinson Crusoe spends twenty-eight years on an island off the coast of Venezuela with his talking parrot Poll, his pet dog, and a tame goat as his only companions. In his twenty-fifth year, he discovers that Carib cannibals occasionally use a desolate beach on the island to kill and eat their captives.

Crusoe helps one of the captives escape his captors. Crusoe ambushes two pursuers, and the others leave in their canoes without knowing what happened to their companions. The escaped captive bows in gratitude to Crusoe, who decides to employ him as a servant. He names him Friday after the weekday upon which the rescue takes place.

Crusoe describes Friday as being a Native American, though very unlike the Indians of Brazil and Virginia. His religion involves the worship of a mountain god named Benamuckee, officiated over by high priests called Oowokakee. Crusoe learned a few of his native words that have been found in a Spanish-Térraba (or Teribe) dictionary, so Friday may have belonged to that tribe, also called the Naso people. Friday is cannibal as well and suggests eating the men Crusoe has killed.

Crusoe teaches Friday the English language and converts him to Christianity. He convinces him that cannibalism is wrong. Friday accompanies him in an ambush in which they save Friday's father.

Crusoe returns to England twenty-eight years after being shipwrecked on that island, and four years after rescuing Friday. Friday's father goes with a Spanish castaway to the mainland to retrieve fourteen other Spanish castaways, but Crusoe and Friday depart the island before they return.

Friday accompanies Crusoe home to England and is his companion in the sequel The Farther Adventures of Robinson Crusoe, in which Friday is killed in a sea battle.

In Jules Verne's L'École des Robinsons (1882), the castaways rescue an African man on their island who says his name is Carefinotu. T. Artelett proposes to call him Mercredi ("Wednesday"), "as it is always done in the islands with Robinsons," but his master Godfrey prefers to keep the original name.

== Film and television adaptations ==
- The 1935 Mickey Mouse cartoon Mickey's Man Friday features Mickey as Crusoe, with Friday and other islanders as humanized monkey characters.
- The 1935 Oswald the Lucky Rabbit cartoon Robinson Crusoe Isle features Oswald applying for a job as Robinson Crusoe's "man Friday". Crusoe's twelve previous Fridays have been eaten by cannibals, making Oswald "Friday the 13th".
- The 1946 Popeye the Sailor cartoon The Island Fling features Bluto as Crusoe, with Friday, as well as Saturday, Sunday and Monday at the end, as humanized monkey characters.
- In Luis Buñuel's 1954 film Robinson Crusoe, Jaime Fernández played Friday alongside Dan O'Herlihy as Crusoe.
- In the 1990s animated series Robinson Sucroe, a parody of Robinson Crusoe, the island Sucroe lands on is heavily populated by friendly natives, all of whom are named after days of the week and times of day (e.g. "Tuesday Dawn") as a reference to Friday.
- The 1964 film Robinson Crusoe on Mars recasts the Robinson Crusoe story as a space adventure. Victor Lundin played the rescued companion of Crusoe figure Commander Christopher Draper (Paul Mantee), who dubs him "Friday" in reference to the novel.
- In the 1966 Walt Disney film Lt. Robin Crusoe, U.S.N., Friday became a beautiful woman, and was named 'Wednesday' instead. The character was played by Nancy Kwan. Dick Van Dyke was cast as Crusoe.
- In the 1968 American family film Robby, Ryp Siani played Friday to Warren Raum's Robby. In choosing his principal actors, writer/director Ralph C. Bluemke first cast ten-year-old Siani in the role of Friday. He was already a seasoned child actor at the time, having been brought up in a show business family, and appearing in television commercials since early childhood. This is the first time a child actor portrays the character and is shown fully nude.
- In the 1970 Mexican film Robinson Crusoe and its 1973 sequel Robinson y Viernes en la Isla Encantada (Robinson and Friday on the Enchanted Island), Ahui Camacho played Friday to Hugo Stiglitz' Crusoe. This is the second time a child actor portrays the character and is shown fully nude (only in the first film).
- Man Friday, a 1975 British film, retold the story from Man Friday's point of view. It starred Richard Roundtree as Man Friday and Peter O'Toole as Crusoe.
- In the 1981 French TV movie Vendredi ou la Vie sauvage, Friday was played by Gene Anthony Ray.
- In the 1982 Norwegian TV series Brødrene Dal og spektralsteinene, in episode number 5 in a parody called "Robinson Caruso", Friday was called Langfredag (Good Friday) and played by Knut Lystad.
- One of the first season episodes of the 1996 Spanish animated series The Triplets is an adaptation of Robinson Crusoe. In this episode, The Bored Witch disguises herself as a native, playing the role of Friday to get closer to Robinson and the triplets.
- In the 1997 film version of Robinson Crusoe, William Takaku played Friday to Pierce Brosnan's Crusoe.
- In the 2008 American TV series Crusoe, Friday was played by Tongayi Chirisa.
- The Marvel Comics and Marvel Cinematic Universe character F.R.I.D.A.Y. is an allusion to the character. She is an artificial intelligence assistant to Tony Stark/Iron Man and first appeared in the comics in 2002 and the films in 2015. In the MCU, F.R.I.D.A.Y. is voiced by Kerry Condon.

== Idiom ==
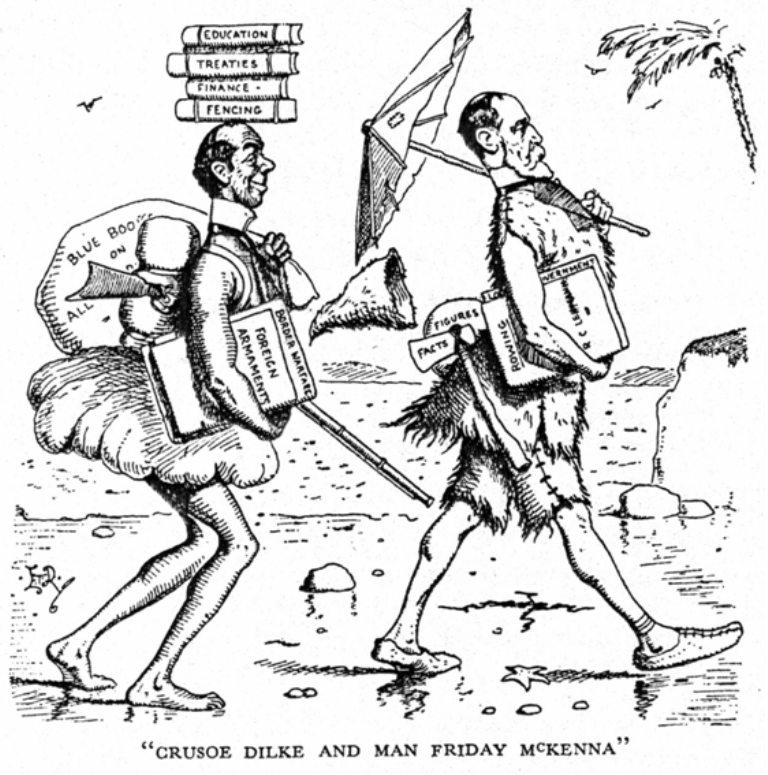
"Crusoe Dilke and Man Friday McKenna", a Punch cartoon c. 1900 depicting banker and politician Reginald McKenna as a loyal servant of Sir Charles Dilke, 2nd Baronet.

The term Man Friday became an idiom to describe an especially faithful servant or one's best servant or right-hand man. The female equivalent is Girl Friday. The July 1, 1912, edition of the news magazine "Industrial World", volume 46, issue 2, published in Pittsburgh, Pennsylvania, uses the term "Girl Friday". The title of the 1940 movie His Girl Friday alludes to it.

== Reception ==
Friday's relationship with Robinson Crusoe has been the subject of academic analysis.
