= Albert Toro =

Papua New Guinean actor (died 2019)

- Born: 23 October 1952
- Died: 11 December 2019 (aged 67)
- Occupations: Actor; director; politician

Albert Toro (23 October 1952- 11 December 2019) was a Papua New Guinean actor, director, and politician.

Toro appeared in Tukana: Husat i Asua? (1984) as the lead character, screenwriter, and director. He was also a co-creator of Warriors in Transit (1992).

Toro was elected to the Bougainville House of Representatives in a 2018 by-election, succeeding Raopos Apou Tepaia, who died in 2016. Toro was sworn in on 2 November 2019, before passing away shortly after on 11 December 2019.
