= William Takaku =

Papua New Guinean actor

- Born: 17 March 1954; Born: Autonomous Region of Bougainville, Papua New Guinea
- Died: 3 January 2011 (aged 56); Port Moresby
- Occupations: Storyteller, Actor, Screenwriter and Theatre director
- Years active: from 1992 (screen)

William Takaku (17 March 1954 — 3 January 2011) was a Papua New Guinean film, television and theatre actor. He was also a screenwriter and a former theatre director.

== Career ==
In the late 1980s and early 1990s, he travelled far from his birthplace on the island of Bougainville, as a storyteller and spokesperson for his people. They had recently expelled from the island copper mining operations which had been polluting the river they depended upon. In June 1991, he was a guest speaker and storyteller at the International Gathering of Mother Earth's People, in Winnipeg, Manitoba, Canada.

=== Education ===
In 1975, as a celebration of Independence, William and a PNG colleague, Matalau, were chosen by the director of NIDA (Australia's National Institute of Dramatic Art, in Sydney) to undertake a year-long special Acting Course. He studied under Alexander Hay with other teachers including Keith Bain, Jicky Martin and Aubrey Mellor. Other students in their cohort were Mel Gibson, Judy Davis and Steve Bisley. He acted roles in Shakespeare's A Midsummer Night's Dream (Puck), The Tempest (Caliban) and Chekhov's Swan Song (Svetlovidov).

In 1981, William returned to NIDA to complete the Dilploma in Directing. In the Directing Course he studied along with Gale Edwards, Mark Gaal and Musa bin Musa.

He was for a time director of the National Theatre Company in Papua New Guinea.

He co-wrote, with Albert Toro, and directed the television miniseries Warriors in Transit (1992). Takaku has also directed the Milne Bay Provincial Theatre Group.

As an actor, he co-starred as Man Friday alongside Pierce Brosnan in the film Robinson Crusoe (1997) and he appeared as Magnus in the television miniseries The Violent Earth (1998).

== Unpublished Plays by William Takaku ==
1980, Eberia. 1985, Medea. A Dream for Melanesia. For Our Tomorrow. Gilgamesh. The Jawsharp Mosquitoes. Judgement of the Birds. On Coughs, Colds and Pneumonia. On Tuberculosis. Pekato bilong Man, (adaptation of Fall of Man by Ulli Beier) The Principal. The Rain Tree. Tru Tru Man.

== Plays by Takaku performed in the National Theatre Repertoire 1974-1982 ==
Eberia Musical Legend 1980 Flying Fox Skit – with Golila Pepe Gilgamesh One Act Play National Puppet Show With Oliver Sublette Olpela Akta Two-hander based on Chekhov's Swan Song Pekato Bilong Man Social comedy adapted from Ulli Beier The Principal Social Issue Drama The Rain Tree Environmental play

Painim Rot: Making New Roads. The Published Plays of Papua New Guinea. Stonehouse, Gary. NIDA Conversion 2001.

== Filmography ==
Year	Title	Role	Notes
1997	Robinson Crusoe	Man Friday	
1998	The Violent Earth	Magnus	3 episodes, (final appearance)
