= Walter Tournier =

Uruguayan film director and animator

- Born: July 14, 1944 (age 81); Montevideo, Uruguay
- Occupation(s): Film director and animator
- Awards: Prince Claus Award (among others)
- Website: https://tournieranimation.com

Walter Tournier (born July 14, 1944) is a Uruguayan director of animated and documentary films, who is closely identified with the country's enterprising filmmaking community. His work has been well-received both at home and at film festivals in Latin America, Europe and the United States.

== Career ==
Tournier studied architecture at the University of the Republic in Montevideo, but decided that his true vocation was filmmaking. He joined C3M (Spanish: Cinemateca del Tercer Mundo) in 1969. He produced his debut film, In the Forest There Is Much to Do, prior to C3M's dissolution in 1974 using cutout animation to tell the story of a father who tries to make his young daughter understand the reason for his incarceration as a political prisoner.

He then lived as an exile in Peru from the military dictatorship in Uruguay until 1985. There he dedicated himself to archaeology, which he studied at the National University of San Marcos in Lima. He also made several short films. During this period, he developed many of the animation techniques that he later applied with considerable success throughout his career such as the use of materials and technologies that he found locally.

Tournier founded Imagenes Studio with producer Mario Jacob in 1986, where he served as head of animation. Among other films, he directed The Hiding Places of the Sun (1990) which showed the aftermath of eleven years of dictatorship in Uruguay through the eyes of children. In addition, he made documentaries and coordinated an animation workshop that resulted in the environmental miniseries Mother Earth. In 1994 he left Imagenes to form a new company, Tournier Animation.

In 2012, following a succession of short films and television miniseries, he directed the first full-length animated picture to be made in Uruguay entitled Selkirk, the Real Robinson Crusoe, with distribution by The Walt Disney Company. The production utilized puppet animation to present the life of 18th-century Scottish sailor Alexander Selkirk. It was acclaimed by Montevideo's El País newspaper as "a visual delight that is rarely found in a movie that is not British or American."

== Recognition ==
Tournier's work has been shown at film festivals in Latin America, Spain, France, Germany and the United States. His internationally awarded animated films include The Condor and the Fox (1980), The Disobedient Carnation (1981), Our Small Paradise (1983), Optical Illusions (1983), The Boss and the Carpenter (2000), Caribbean Christmas (2001) and In Spite of Everything (2003). In 2002 he received the Prince Claus Award from the Netherlands for his contributions to culture.

== Filmography ==
Tournier was involved in the production of the following films:

Year	Title	Credit	Format
1974	In the Forest There Is Much to Do	Director, animator	Short
1980	The Condor and the Fox	Director, animator, cinematographer	Short
1981	The Disobedient Carnation	Director	Short
1983	Our Small Paradise	Producer, director, screenwriter, animator, cinematographer	Short
1983	Optical Illusions	Producer, director, screenwriter, cinematographer	Short documentary
1990	The Hiding Places of the Sun	Director	Short
1992	The Montevidean Boulevard	Director, animator	Short documentary
1997	The Tatitos	Director	TV miniseries
1998	Octavio Podesta	Director	Short documentary
2000	The Boss and the Carpenter	Director	Short
2001	Caribbean Christmas	Director, screenwriter	Short
2001	The Tatitos	Director	TV miniseries
2003	In Spite of Everything	Producer, director, screenwriter	Short
2003	Tack, Rod and Lettuce	Director, animator	Short
2005	We Want to Live	Director, screenwriter, animator	Short
2006	We Want That They Hear Us	Director, animator	Short
2007	Tonky and Other Friends	Producer, director, screenwriter, animator	Short
2008	The Perfect Faucet	Director, screenwriter, animator	Short
2012	Selkirk, the Real Robinson Crusoe	Director, screenwriter	Feature
