= Martin Grace =

Stunt actor (1942–2010)

- Born: Martin Ryan Grace; September 11, 1942; Kilkenny, Ireland
- Died: January 27, 2010 (aged 67); Spain
- Education: Mountview Theatre School
- Occupation: Stunt actor
- Known for: Stunt double of Roger Moore in the James Bond films and Harrison Ford in Indiana Jones

Martin Grace (11 September 1942 – 27 January 2010) was an Irish stunt actor, stunt coordinator, second unit director, and stunt double, who appeared in at least 73 films. He is best known for being the stunt double of Roger Moore in the James Bond films and Harrison Ford in Indiana Jones, and Terry Gilliam in Brazil (1985). He also worked on Superman (1978).

== Biography ==
Martin Ryan Grace was born in September 1942 on a farm between Freshford and Lisdowney, Ireland. He went to the national school in Lisdowney, he attended Kilkenny College and in the early 1960s he moved to London, England, to join an action agency and trained at the Mountview Theatre School, where he worked for Supersoft hairspray and Cadbury's Milk Tray commercials. His film debut was in the television spin-off Dr Who and the Daleks (1965), he engaged for You Only Live Twice (1967) and Alfred the Great (1969).

He became Roger Moore's main stunt double in the James Bond films from The Spy Who Loved Me (1977) up until his departure from the series in A View To A Kill (1985). Grace also doubled for Moore in his non-Bond films, including The Wild Geese (1978), North Sea Hijack (1979), Escape to Athena (1979), Sea Wolves (1980), and The Naked Face (1984). He also doubled Harrison Ford in Indiana Jones films Raiders of the Lost Ark (1981), The Temple of Doom (1984) and Last Crusade (1989).

He doubled Oliver Reed in The Assassination Bureau (1969), he fought with Anthony Hopkins in When Eight Bells Toll (1971), and he worked with Kirk Douglas in To Catch a Spy (1971). In the making of Octopussy he was seriously injured, and while doubling for Albert Finney in Scrooge (1970) he broke his neck, so he spent seven months out of action.

He also appeared in The Wild Geese (1978), Escape to Athena (1979), North Sea Hijack (1979), The Sea Wolves (1980), Who Dares Wins (1982), Curse of the Pink Panther (1983), The Naked Face (1984), television programmes The Onedin Line (1972) and The Protectors, and he doubled for Richard Kiel in The Spy Who Loved Me (1977) and Moonraker (1979).

Grace was the stunt co-ordinator on High Spirits (1988), Erik the Viking (1989), Nuns on the Run (1990), Patriot Games (1992) and Angela's Ashes (1999).

In November 2009, he fractured his pelvis after a cycling accident, in 2010 he developed breathing problems and he died on 27 January 2010 in Spain from an aneurysm at the age of 67. He was twice married and he was survived by his daughter Anna.

== Filmography ==
| Year | Title | Role | Notes |
|---|---|---|---|
| 1965 | Dr. Who and the Daleks | Thal #8 | |
| 1968 | Inadmissible Evidence | Plain clothes detective | |
| 1969 | Moon Zero Two | Red Killer | Uncredited |
| 1971 | When Eight Bells Toll | Thug | Uncredited |
| 1972 | Go for a Take | Leopard Man | |
| 1973 | Horror Hospital | Bike Boy #1 | |
| 1978 | The Wild Geese | East German Officer #2 | |
| 1980 | The Sea Wolves | Kruger | |
| 1981 | Raiders of the Lost Ark | German Soldier | Uncredited |
| 1982 | Who Dares Wins | U.S. Marine Guard #2 | |
| 1983 | Curse of the Pink Panther | Bruno's Crony #2 | |
| 1984 | Top Secret! | Montage (Resistance Member) | Uncredited |
| 1989 | Indiana Jones and the Last Crusade | German Soldier | Uncredited |
| 1991 | Under Suspicion | Colin | |
| 1997 | Robinson Crusoe | Captain Braga | |
