= Kevin Stitt (film editor) =

American film editor

- Occupation: Film editor
- Years active: 1984–present

Kevin Stitt is an American film editor with more than 35 credits to his name. Stitt was nominated for the Saturn Award for Best Editing in 2016 for his work on Jurassic World. He was also nominated for the American Cinema Editors Award for Best Edited Documentary in 2009 for Michael Jackson's This Is It along with three other editors.

== Filmography ==
=== Editing ===
Year	Title	Notes
1984	Romancing the Stone	Assistant editor
1986	Short Circuit	Assistant film editor
1986	Big Trouble	Assistant film editor
1987	Harry and the Hendersons	Associate editor
1989	Gleaming the Cube	Associate editor
1989	Lethal Weapon 2	Assistant film editor
1990	Die Hard 2	First assistant editor
1991	New Jack City	Additional editor/first assistant film editor
1991	The Last Boy Scout	Assistant film editor
1993	Point of No Return	Assistant editor
1993	Another Stakeout	Additional film editor
1994	Maverick	Assistant film editor
1995	Nick of Time	
1996	Executive Decision	
1997	Breakdown	
1997	Robinson Crusoe	
1997	Conspiracy Theory	
1998	Lethal Weapon 4	
1999	Payback	
1999	Deep Blue Sea	Additional editor
2000	X-Men	
2001	A Knight's Tale	
2001	The Last Castle	
2003	The Order	
2003	Paycheck	
2005	Elektra	
2006	Payback: Straight Up	Direct-to-video
2006	Apocalypto	Assistant film editor
2007	The Kingdom	
2008	Cloverfield	
2009	Surrogates	
2009	This Is It	Documentary
2012	Man on a Ledge	
2012	Jack Reacher	
2013	42	
2015	Blackhat	Additional editor
2015	Jurassic World	
2017	The Book of Henry	
