= Warriors in Transit =

- Genre: television drama
- Created by: William Takaku, Albert Toro
- Theme music composer: Sanguma
- Country of origin: Papua New Guinea
- Original language: English
- No. of series: 1
- No. of episodes: 8

Original release
- Release: 1992

Warriors in Transit is a 1992 Papua New Guinea theatrical television series (or televised play), written and directed by William Takaku and Albert Toro. It consists in eight episodes, lasting twenty-five minutes each. It was the first ever "broadcast-length drama wholly conceived and produced by Papua New Guineans". Its production cost approximately €125,000.

The series "depicts political duplicity and the disintegration of a family in the Port Moresby settlements". Its central characters are parents who attempt, unsuccessfully, to look after their sick child. Takaku has stated that the parents' characters represent the Papua New Guinean government, while the child represents the nation.
