= Robby (film) =

- DVD cover
- Directed by: Ralph C. Bluemke
- Written by: Ralph C. Bluemke
- Produced by: Stacey Enyeart
- Starring: Warren Raum; Ryp Siani; John Garces
- Cinematography: Al Mozell
- Edited by: Bill Buckley
- Music by: John Randolph Eaton; Christopher Young
- Distributed by: Award Films International; Bluewood Films
- Release date: August 14, 1968
- Running time: 60 min
- Country: United States
- Language: English

Robby is a 1968 family film written and directed by Ralph C. Bluemke. It is a modern-day retelling of Daniel Defoe's 1719 novel Robinson Crusoe in which the main characters are portrayed as children. The film deals with many themes, including friendship, homesickness, racial blindness and naturism.

== Plot ==
The film opens with a lifeboat washing up onto shore of a tropical island. Inside the lifeboat is eight-year-old Robby. Robby explores the island but finds no signs of any other humans. He falls into a lagoon and almost drowns, but is rescued by a naked ten-year-old black native boy, whom Robby befriends and names Friday. Robby questions Friday about his naked state and lack of shame, but it soon becomes quite clear that Friday does not understand English.

It is not long before Robby himself abandons his own clothes and the two friends scamper around the island naked and free without adult supervision. Robby teaches Friday how to speak English and fashions a pair of jean shorts for him using his t-shirt, and in turn Friday teaches Robby how to swim (this also being his very first skinny dipping and sea bathing experience). Together, the two boys survive on the island, with only each other to rely on. They build a shelter and fish for sustenance. They are faced with threats of poisonous snakes and cannibals, of which they find evidence in the form of human remains, as well as a stranger who mysteriously appears on their island one night.

The stranger, who later introduces himself as Hank, wakes the boys up in the middle of the night rambling in a drunken stupor to his imaginary friend Fitzgibbons. The boys, sleeping in the naked state to which they have become accustomed, leave their makeshift hut to investigate. Robby, thinking it might be his father coming to rescue him, puts on his now tattered cutoff jean shorts. Friday sees no need to get dressed, believing the voices to belong to cannibals from a neighboring island. The boys arrive on the beach to find Hank passed out, and they drag him back to their hut.

The next day, Hank wakes up and investigates his surroundings. He finds Robby's t-shirt and tattered shorts strewn carelessly on the beach outside the hut, and he hears children laughing in the distance. He follows the sound of the laughter to the lagoon, where he discovers Robby and Friday spearfishing in the nude. Hank introduces himself to the boys, who in turn share their fish and show him around their island. The boys remain unclothed in the presence of their guest, but they are not the least bit embarrassed or ashamed to be seen naked by an adult, and Hank does not reprimand them for it. He even joins them skinny dipping in the ocean.

Robby asks Hank if he knows his father. Hank tells him he does not, but that he is familiar with his father's work, though it is quite clear he is hiding something. Hank later reveals that he read about Robby's father in the newspaper, that he and Robby's mother died at sea, and that Robby was the only one to survive the shipwreck. Robby and Friday get dressed and Hank takes them both home in his sailboat to live with Robby's rich aunt.

Back in civilization, Robby and Friday listen to a seashell which reminds them of the ocean, conjuring fond memories of running naked on the beach, playing Cowboys and Indians, and skinny dipping in the surf.

== Cast ==
- Warren Raum as Robby
- Ryp Siani as Friday
- John Garces as Harton Crandall
- Rita Elliot as Janet Woodruff
- Ralph Bluemke as Chauffeur

== Production ==
Writer/director Ralph C. Bluemke originally conceived the idea of retelling the classic Robinson Crusoe story with children as the principals while working at a bank in 1960, seven years before filming would even begin.

In choosing his principal actors, Bluemke first cast ten-year-old Ryp Siani in the role of Friday. Ryp was already a seasoned child actor by this time, having been brought up in a show business family, and appearing in television commercials since early childhood. Casting the role of Robby was more challenging. After looking at dozens of child actors, Bluemke finally settled on nine-year-old Warren Raum. For the role, Warren's hair was bleached platinum blond in order to symbolize the innocence of youth, and also to further contrast Ryp's dark hair and complexion.

The film was shot on location on Vieques Island in Puerto Rico, the same island on which Lord of the Flies (1963) was shot five years earlier.

=== Nudity ===
Given the nature and location of the script, writer/director Ralph C. Bluemke knew from the beginning that the film would require a certain amount of nudity in order to give it a sense of realism and authenticity. Warren Raum (age 9) and Ryp Siani (age 10), who played Robby and Friday, respectively, were both Bluemke's first choices for the leading roles. Fortunately for him, both the child actors and their parents were okay with the nudity featured in the script.

When cinematographer Al Mozell asked Bluemke how far he wanted to go in showing the actors' naked bodies, Bluemke told him to simply film the boys as if they were fully clothed. Mozell reluctantly agreed, saying, "Okay, but nudity is a no-no."

Bluemke at the time was under the impression that the nudity depicted in the film would be condoned as natural and innocent, given the backdrop of the story, and given that the actors involved were prepubescent boys. At the time, it was much more acceptable to show child nudity than adult nudity in films, as it was considered wholesome and nonsexual. He cited Lord of the Flies (1963) as an example, a film which also depicted naked boys in a similar setting, some of whom were even older than Raum and Siani. However, Lord of the Flies depicted primarily incidental rear nudity, while Robby included lengthy shots of full frontal nudity of both boys. As a result, the film failed to attain a wide distribution deal, as prospective distributors were wary about the extensive nude scenes.

When it came time to remove his pants and underwear, it was soon revealed that Warren had a sharp tan line in the shape of his shorts that caused his buttocks and penis to be pale white in strong contrast to his otherwise bronzed complexion. Ryp's tan line, while present, was less noticeable due to his naturally darker complexion. Consequently, on the first day of shooting their nude scenes, both Warren and Ryp suffered severe sunburn to the buttocks, as these sensitive areas were not accustomed to long term exposure to the sun. As a result, filming had to be postponed briefly while the actors recovered. By the time filming ended, however, both boys had developed dark, full body tans.

Before filming began, none of the cast and crew were nudists. However, since many of their scenes were filmed naked, Warren Raum and Ryp Siani quickly took to the habit of being nude unless it was required for a particular scene. As a result, the rest of the cast and crew soon became accustomed to seeing the two boys wandering around the set stark naked, even when not filming. Much of the crew eventually joined in, occasionally skinny dipping with the actors during lunch breaks and downtime.

=== Possible deleted or lost ending ===
According to the AFI Catalog of Feature Films there was an early print of the film which ran 91 minutes and featured additional scenes as well as a dramatic ending in which Robby and Friday were separated against their will due to racism.

The original ending is described as follows:

The next day Crandall, a writer, recognizes Robby from newspaper photographs. He tells Robby that his wealthy aunt and uncle, Janet and Lloyd Woodruff, have offered a reward for information about the boy and takes Robby, and also Friday, back to the States in his leaky boat. Arriving at the aunt's estate, Crandall speaks glowingly of the boys to the aunt, who assures him that the boys will be allowed to remain together. But when Robby's uncle, a fortune hunter, arrives home and sees the situation, he persuades his wife to place Friday in an adoption agency. There, Lloyd Woodruff reasons, a black family can adopt him. Thus disposed of, Friday will no longer threaten the Woodruffs' social standing. When a man from the orphanage comes for Friday, Robby desperately, but futilely, tries to prevent him from taking his friend. Perplexed as to why he and Friday cannot remain together, Robby tearfully watches as Friday is taken away.

A review for the film on Rarefilmm: The Cave of Forgotten Films published on September 9, 2018, stated:

When a passerby novelist comes to the island and recognizes the wealthy boy, he takes both boys with him back to civilization. He promises they’ll remain together, but the viewer rightfully doubts his word, because when they arrive, the boys are separated due to society’s racial bigotry.

It is unknown whether this footage was either cut from the final print before the film's premiere or if it was lost before the film was released on home video by Award Films International in 1983, as its current running time is around 60 minutes.

== Reception ==
=== Release ===
The film failed to secure a wide distribution deal, in part because prospective distributors were wary about the extensive nudity featured in the film. Undaunted, the producers raised enough capital to release the film themselves, acting as their own distributor. It had limited screenings on Broadway in New York City in August 1968.

=== Home media ===
The film was originally released on VHS in 1983 by Award Films International. A newly restored print of the film was released on VHS by Top Quality Video in 1995. A Region Free DVD was also subsequently released in 2001, featuring bonus material including the film's original theatrical trailer, a behind-the-scenes photo gallery, press quotes and an illustrated Robby book and making-of text by writer/director Ralph C. Bluemke. Both the VHS and DVD release versions feature a new score credited to composer Christopher Young, replacing the film's original score by John Randolph Eaton.

=== Critical response ===
Upon its initial release, Robby received widely positive reviews from critics. Bob Salmaggi, of WINS, New York, called the film "Enchanting! ... a heartwarming masterpiece." Howard Thompson of The New York Times called it "a genteel little drama, purposeful in content, perceptive in tone." Com-Collegiate News called Robby "Among the best movies of the year! ... a thoughtful, artistic parable that is both heartwarming and timeless."

In addition, both actors Raum and Siani received praise for their performances in the film. Variety said "Warren Raum as Robby and Ryp Siani as Friday could put precocious Hollywood child actors to shame!" Com-Collegiate News said "Robby is played very well by young Warren Raum, and Ryp Siani displays some of the best acting a child has ever done on the screen!" Bob Salmaggi called Warren Raum "a little charmer as Robby, and Ryp Siani ... absolutely perfect as Friday."

== Book adaptation ==
After the film's release, Robby was adapted into a children's book by writer/director Ralph C. Bluemke. This adaptation featured additional story details which were not present or in some cases fully developed in the final film. It was illustrated with black-and-white film stills as well as behind-the-scenes photographs showing the film's cast and crew, most of which were taken during the filming of the nude swimming scenes and the ending. The entire text of the book, along with the stills, as well as an extensive 1978 interview with Ralph C. Bluemke detailing the film's development, casting, release and distribution as well as the importance of nudity within the story, is included as a bonus feature on the 2001 DVD release from Award Films International.

== See also ==
- List of American films of 1968
- Naturism
- Nude recreation
- Nude swimming
- Nudity
- Nudity in film
- Robinson Crusoe
- Sea bathing
- Survival film

== Bibliography ==
- "Award Films Presents Robby" (Press release). Award Films. 1983.
