= The Farther Adventures of Robinson Crusoe =

1719 novel by Daniel Defoe

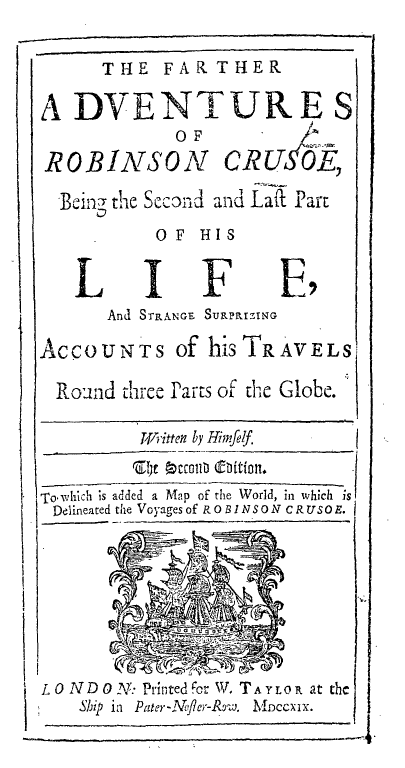
- Author: Daniel Defoe
- Original title: The Farther Adventures of Robinson Crusoe; Being the Second and Last Part of His Life, And of the Strange Surprising Accounts of his Travels Round three Parts of the Globe. Written by Himself.
- Language: English
- Genre: Novel
- Publisher: W. Taylor
- Publication date: 1719
- Publication place: England
- Media type: Print
- Preceded by: Robinson Crusoe
- Followed by: Serious Reflections of Robinson Crusoe

The Farther Adventures of Robinson Crusoe (now more commonly rendered as The Further Adventures of Robinson Crusoe) is a novel by Daniel Defoe, first published in 1719. Just as in its significantly more popular predecessor, Robinson Crusoe (1719), the first edition credits the work's fictional protagonist Robinson Crusoe as its author. It was published under the considerably longer original title: The Farther Adventures of Robinson Crusoe; Being the Second and Last Part of His Life, And of the Strange Surprising Accounts of his Travels Round three Parts of the Globe. Although intended to be the last Crusoe tale, the novel is followed by a non-fiction book involving Crusoe by Defoe entitled Serious Reflections During the Life and Surprising Adventures of Robinson Crusoe: With his Vision of the Angelick World (1720).

It has been speculated that the story is partially based on Moscow embassy secretary Adam Brand's journal detailing the embassy's journey from Moscow to Peking from 1693 to 1695.

== Plot summary ==
The book starts with a statement about Crusoe's marriage in England. After the events of the first novel, Crusoe buys a small farm in Bedfordshire and has three children: two sons and one daughter. He grows restless, and desires to see "his island" off the coast of colonial Venezuela again. His wife tells him, in tears, "I will go with you, but I won't leave you." However, she suddenly dies immediately upon making this promise, leaving Crusoe filled with a new sense of divine purpose.

=== Crusoe's return to his island ===
At the beginning of 1693, Crusoe makes his nephew the commander of a ship. In January 1694, Crusoe and his manservant Friday go on board the ship in the Downs on the 8th, then arrive at Crusoe's Island after a stop in Ireland. They discover that the English mutineers left on the island by Crusoe a decade earlier had been making trouble. But when the island fell under attack by cannibals, the various parties on the island were forced to work together under truce to meet the threat. Crusoe takes various steps to consolidate leadership on the island and assure the civility of the inhabitants, including leaving a quantity of needed supplies, setting up a sort of rule of law under an honour system and ensuring cohabitating couples are married. He also leaves additional residents with necessary skills. On the way to the mainland once again from Crusoe's island, the ship is attacked by the cannibals. Friday dies from three arrow shots during an attempt to negotiate, but the crew eventually wins the encounter without further serious casualties. After these events, he never returns to the island nor discusses it further, telling the reader to "turn his thoughts entirely from it".

=== Crusoe's adventures in Madagascar ===
After having buried Friday at sea, the same evening Crusoe and his men set sail for Brazil. They stay for a long period there, then travel directly to the Cape of Good Hope. They land on Madagascar where their nine men are pursued by three hundred natives, because one of his mariners had carried off a young native girl among the trees. The natives hang the kidnapper, so the crew massacre 32 persons and burn the houses of the natives' town. Crusoe opposes all these acts, resulting in him getting marooned, and settling on the Bay of Bengal for a long time.

=== Crusoe's travels in Southeast Asia and China ===
Finally, Crusoe purchases a ship that later turns out to be stolen. Crusoe and his new crew voyage to the rivers of Cambodia and Cochinchina where they meet the Bay of Tonquin, until they come to the latitude of 22 degrees and 30 minutes, and anchor at the island of Formosa (Taiwan). Then they arrive on the coast of China. They visit Nanking near the river of Kilam, and sail southwards to a port called Quinchang. An old Portuguese pilot suggests that they sail to Ningpo by the mouth of the Yongjiang River. From there, they journey up the Grand Canal that passes through the heart of Qing-era China, cross rivers and hills with the help of sluices and gates, and arrive in Peking. After a short stay in February, they depart.

Crusoe and his men travel through the cities of Changu and Naum, before crossing the Argun on the China–Russia border, on 13 April 1703.

=== Crusoe's travels in Siberia ===
Argun is the first town on the Russian border they visit; then Crusoe and his men hike through the towns of Nertzinskoi (Nerchinsk) and Plotbus, past a lake called Schaks Ozer, through Jerawena, along the river then through Udda, Yeniseysk, and Tobolsk, from September 1703 to early June 1704. They arrive in Europe around the source of the river Wirtska, south of the river Petrou, in a village called Kermazinskoy near Soloy Kamskoy (Solikamsk).

Crusoe's team pass a small river called Kirtza, near Ozomoys (or Gzomoys), come to Veuslima on the river Witzogda (Vychegda), running into the Dvina, then they stay in Lawrenskoy from 3 to 7 July 1704. Finally Crusoe arrives at the White Sea port town of Arch-Angel (Arkhangelsk) on 18 August, then stop over at Hamburg on 18 September and The Hague in the fall. He arrives in London on 10 January 1705, having been gone from England for ten years and nine months. Now at the age of 72, he decides to let himself travel no more and looks forward to a peaceful death.
