= The Violent Earth =

- Genre: Historical drama
- Based on: Terre violente by Jacqueline Sénès
- Written by: Tony Ayres; Jean-Marie Colombani; Graeme Farmer; Peter Gawler; Jean-Pierra Sinapi; Daniel Tonachelle
- Directed by: Michael Offer
- Starring: Karina Lombard; Claudia Karvan; Claire Nebout
- Countries of origin: Australia; France
- Original language: English
- No. of episodes: 3

Production
- Executive producers: Christian Charret; Bruce Gordon; Kris Noble; David Rouse; Jacques Salles
- Producer: Jock Blair
- Running time: 3 x 120 mins
- Production companies: Crawford Productions; Gaumont
- Budget: $10 million

Original release
- Network: Nine Network
- Release: 17 September – 24 September 1999 (AU)

The Violent Earth is a 1998 French-Australian co-production miniseries set in New Caledonia from 1888 to 1977. It was broadcast on the Nine Network in Australia.

== Plot ==
The series is set in New Caledonia, and follows the Australian-Irish Sutton family and the indigenous Kanaks amidst French colonialism.

== Production ==
The series is adapted from the novel Terre violente by Jacqueline Sénès. Production on the series was supposed to begin in 1995, however, it did not begin until 1997. It had a budget of $10 million. The Violent Earth is a co-production between Gaumont and Crawford Productions. It was filmed on-location in Paris, Noumea, Port Douglas and Melbourne. The Violent Earth was broadcast from 17 September 1999 in Australia.

== Cast ==
- Karina Lombard : Anna Temaru
- Claudia Karvan : Jeanne
- Claire Nebout : Hélène
  - Brittany Byrnes : Young Hélène
- Laure Killing : Maximilienne Sutton
- Joe Petruzzi : Vincenzo Scarpinato
- Arnaud Giovaninetti : Carlo Scarpinato
- Simone Kessell : Gabrielle
- Jay Laga'aia : Jean-Christian
- Andrew McFarlane : Tom Sutton
  - Daniel Daperis : Young Tom
- Jeremy Callaghan : John Sutton
- Bernard Verley : Hippocrates
- Bill Hunter : Campbell
- Rodney Bell : François
- Manu Bennett : Wanatcha DuValier
- Martin Copping : Mr. Best
- Frank Gallacher : Father Moissan
- Mark Gerber : Roland
- Peter McCauley : Theroux
- Sally McDonald : Jill
- Andrew McKaige : Gendarme Captain
- Rosaline Nachero : Clarisse
- Peter O'Brien : Yann Chevalier
- Pierre Pudewa : Chief Pore
- Justine Saunders : Aunt Junie
- William Takaku : Magnus
- Bud Tingwell : Bishop Guiart

== Reception ==
At the 40th Australian Film Institute Awards, The Violent Earth received nominations for Best Television Mini-Series or Telefeature, Best Achievement in Direction in a Television Drama, and Best Screenplay in a Television Drama.
