= Pedro Serrano (sailor) =

Spanish sailor

- Born: Pedro Luis Serrano
- Occupation: Sailor
- Known for: Being marooned on a desert island

Pedro Luis Serrano, also referred to as Pedro de Serrano, was a 16th century Spanish sailor who was allegedly marooned for seven to eight years on a small desert island. Details of the story differ, but the most common version has him shipwrecked on a small island in the Caribbean off the coast of Nicaragua, sometime in the 1520s. Serrano survived by eating shrimp, cockles, and other animals he found washed up on the shore, and by collecting drinking water in sea turtle shells when it rained. When rainwater was unavailable, he also drank the blood of the turtles he had captured.

In some versions of the story, Serrano was joined by another Spanish castaway after three years on the island. Due to Serrano's isolation and unkempt state, both men initially mistook one another for the Devil, and quickly fled from each another. They reconciled when both men were able to invoke the name of Jesus Christ. The two men lived together on the island for about four years. They reportedly had a brief falling-out, in which each man isolated himself to one half of the island, but they were later re-reconciled.

== Rescue ==
Serrano and his companion were eventually rescued by a ship that had sighted their smoke signal. The sailors dispatched to pick them up, also mistaking both the men for the Devil, attempted to flee, but returned and rescued the men when they again invoked the name of Christ. Whilst Serrano's companion died on the voyage back to Spain, Serrano returned home safely and exhibited himself for money, never cutting his hair or his beard, which had grown "to his waist" during his time as a castaway. After receiving a sum of 4,000 pieces of eight from the King of Spain, Serrano sailed to the Americas to collect the money, but died during the voyage. Other versions of Serrano's story state that he had become insane by the time he was rescued.

== Historicity ==
The tale of Serrano may have been loosely based on the historical case of "Maestre Joan", who in 1528 was stranded on cay now named Serrana Bank, and was rescued eight years later.

The name Serrana Bank first appears on a Dutch map of 1545. Other versions place the events in the Pacific, off the coast of Peru, as late as the 1540s. There is some doubt about the historicity of the tale. The earliest known source is Garcilaso de la Vega's Comentarios Reales de los Incas (1609).

== In literature ==
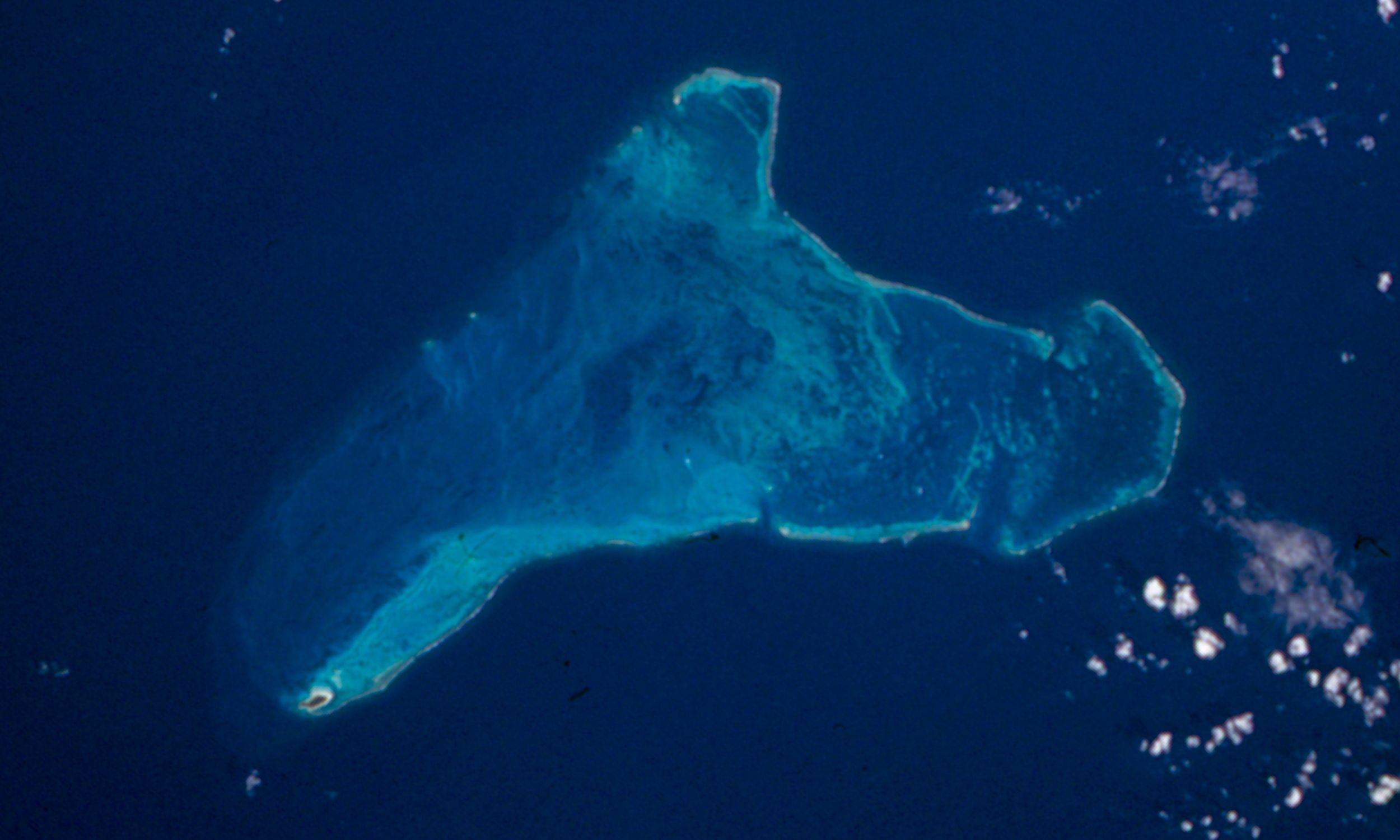
Serrana Bank, an atoll in the Caribbean Sea, may have been the island on which Pedro de Serrano was stranded.

Serrano's story has been heavily adapted and retold since the 17th century. One such work is the comedic poem Etiquette, written in the 19th century by the librettist W. S. Gilbert, which heavily adapts Serrano's story as a satire of Victorian era social customs. In the poem, Serrano and his island companion are two English businessmen named "Peter Gray" and "Somers", who are stranded on a desert island when their ship, the Ballyshannon, is "foundered off the coast of Cariboo". Despite their situation, the two men refuse to speak to each other, not having been formally introduced. They decide without discussion to divide the island between them. However, they soon discover that Gray's portion of the island is rich in oysters, which Gray cannot eat, whilst Somers' portion is rich in turtles, which Somers cannot eat. Whilst the two men could easily switch sides, they refuse to discuss this with one another, as this would be socially improper.

One day, Gray overhears Somers musing about his friend Robinson, with whom Gray reveals he has a mutual friendship, which finally allows the two men to speak. They eventually become very close friends. After many years on the island, Gray and Somers see a vessel in the distance. However, they discover that it is in fact a convict ship, and when a boat comes to pick them up, they refuse rescue, being unwilling to associate themselves with convicts. Also, they are horrified to discover that none other than their mutual friend, Robinson, is pulling the oar, and they learn that Robinson had been convicted for "misappropriating stock". Gray and Somers, completely embarrassed about having made friends with someone who is associated with a criminal, revert to not speaking to one another. They divide the island once more, alone and unable to eat the food they find on shore.

== See also ==
- Alexander Selkirk, an 18th-century Scottish castaway
