= Serious Reflections of Robinson Crusoe =

1720 essay collection by Daniel Defoe

- Author: Daniel Defoe
- Original title: Serious Reflections During the Life and Surprising Adventures of Robinson Crusoe: With his Vision of the Angelick World
- Language: English
- Genre: Novel
- Publisher: W. Taylor
- Publication date: 1720
- Publication place: England
- Preceded by: The Farther Adventures of Robinson Crusoe

Serious Reflections During the Life and Surprising Adventures of Robinson Crusoe: With his Vision of the Angelick World (1720) is the third and final book featuring the character of Robinson Crusoe and the sequel to The Farther Adventures of Robinson Crusoe (1719). Unlike the previous two volumes, it is not a work of narrative fiction. Rather, it consists of a series of essays written in the voice of the character Robinson Crusoe. These essays touch on topics including solitude, religion, liberty, and epistemology of mind, showing the influence of Locke and Montaigne.
