= National Theatre Company (Papua New Guinea) =

The National Theatre Company was, as its name suggests, a State-funded theatre company in Papua New Guinea. It was directed by William Takaku and administered by the government's National Cultural Commission. Its ambitious aim, as described by UNESCO, was "to create a Papua New Guinea cultural identity, mainly through dance and drama".

The Company toured the country and staged plays in remote rural areas. While stopping in a village for an open-air performance, it would also hold theatrical workshops, to assist local theatre groups, and learn dances and legends from elderly villagers. A number of performances were "based on local folklore, music [and] dance".

Its plays, set both in rural and in urban areas, explored environmental themes as well as problems related to life in the city. Performances were "liberally laced with music, dancing and comedy", but aimed to address serious issues. Plays were produced in the English language and in Tok Pisin.

According to the Australian Broadcasting Corporation, the Company eventually "f[ell] into a state of disarray as a result of inadequate funding".

== See also ==
- Wan Smolbag, a similar theatre company in Vanuatu
