= Alexander Selkirk =

Scottish sailor and castaway (1676-1721)

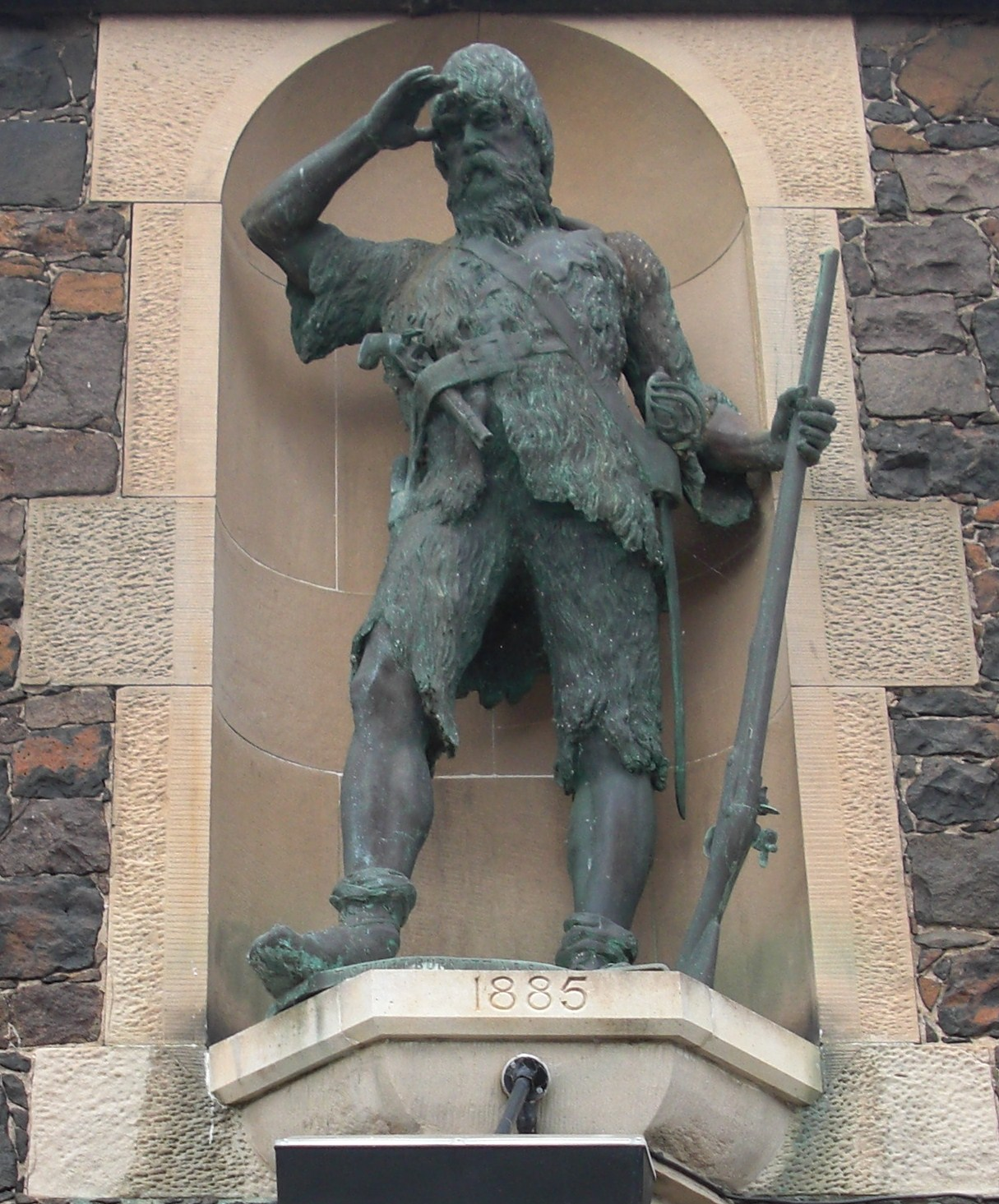
- Clad in goatskins, Selkirk awaits rescue in a sculpture by Thomas Stuart Burnett (1885)
- Born: 1676; Lower Largo, Fife, Scotland
- Died: 13 December 1721 (aged 45); Cape Coast, Gold Coast
- Occupation: Sailor
- Known for: Inspiring Robinson Crusoe
- Parent(s): John Selcraig, Euphan Mackie

Alexander Selkirk (1676 – 13 December 1721) was a Scottish privateer and Royal Navy officer who spent four years and four months as a castaway (1704–1709) after being marooned by his captain, initially at his request, on an uninhabited island in the South Pacific Ocean.

Selkirk was an unruly youth and joined buccaneering voyages to the South Pacific during the War of the Spanish Succession. One such expedition was on Cinque Ports, captained by Thomas Stradling, under the overall command of William Dampier. Stradling's ship stopped to resupply at the uninhabited Juan Fernández Islands, west of South America, and Selkirk judged correctly that the craft was unseaworthy and asked to be left there. Selkirk's suspicions were soon justified, as Cinque Ports foundered near Malpelo Island 400 km (250 mi) from the coast of what is now Colombia.

By the time he was eventually rescued by the privateer Woodes Rogers, who was accompanied by Dampier, Selkirk had become adept at hunting and making use of the resources that he found on the island. His story of survival was widely publicized after his return and became one of the reputed sources of inspiration for the fictional character Robinson Crusoe of the English writer Daniel Defoe.

== Early life and privateering ==
Alexander Selkirk was the son of a shoemaker and tanner in Lower Largo, Fife, Scotland, born in 1676. In his youth, he displayed a quarrelsome and unruly disposition. He was summoned before the Kirk Session in August 1693 for his "indecent conduct in church", but he "did not appear, being gone to sea". He was back at Largo in 1701 when he again came to the attention of church authorities for assaulting his brothers.

Early on, he was engaged in buccaneering. In 1703, he joined an expedition of English privateer and explorer William Dampier to the South Pacific Ocean, setting sail from Kinsale in Ireland on 11 September. They carried letters of marque from the Lord High Admiral authorizing their armed merchant ships to attack foreign enemies as the War of the Spanish Succession was then going on between England and Spain. Dampier was captain of St George and Selkirk served on Cinque Ports, St George's companion ship, as sailing master under Captain Thomas Stradling. By this time, Selkirk must have had considerable experience at sea.

In February 1704, following a stormy passage around Cape Horn, the privateers fought a long battle with a well-armed French vessel, St Joseph, only to have it escape to warn its Spanish allies of their arrival in the Pacific. A raid on the Panamanian gold mining town of Santa María failed when their landing party was ambushed. The easy capture of Asunción, a heavily laden merchantman, revived the men's hopes of plunder, and Selkirk was put in charge of the prize ship. Dampier took off some much-needed provisions of wine, brandy, sugar, and flour, then abruptly set the ship free, arguing that the gain was not worth the effort. In May 1704, Stradling decided to abandon Dampier and strike out on his own.

== Castaway ==
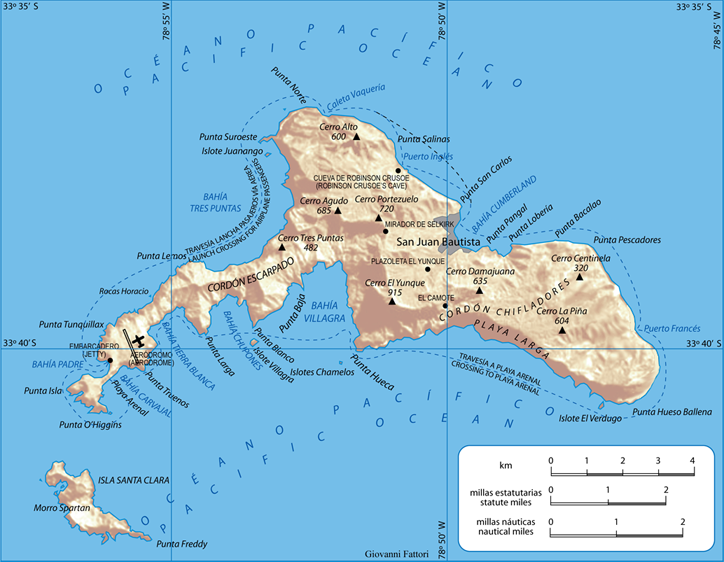
Map of Robinson Crusoe Island (formerly Más a Tierra island), where Selkirk lived as a castaway

In September 1704, after parting ways with Dampier, Captain Stradling took Cinque Ports to an island known to the Spanish as Más a Tierra located in the uninhabited Juan Fernández archipelago 670 km (420 mi) off the coast of Chile for a mid-expedition restocking of fresh water and supplies.

Selkirk had grave concerns about the seaworthiness of their vessel and wanted to make the necessary repairs before going any further. He declared that he would rather stay on Juan Fernández than continue in a dangerously leaky ship. Stradling took him up on the offer and landed Selkirk on the island with a musket, a hatchet, a knife, a cooking pot, a Bible, bedding and some clothes. Selkirk immediately regretted his rashness, but Stradling refused to let him back on board.

Cinque Ports later foundered off the coast of what is now Colombia. Stradling and "six or seven of his Men" survived the loss of their ship but were forced to surrender to the Spanish. They were taken to Lima where they endured a harsh imprisonment. Stradling attempted escape after stealing a canoe in Lima, but was recaptured and punished. The Spanish governor threatened to send all the survivors to the mines. The survivors ultimately returned to England after four years of imprisonment.

=== Life on the island ===
At first, Selkirk remained along the shoreline of Más a Tierra. During this time, he ate spiny lobsters and scanned the ocean daily for rescue, suffering all the while from loneliness, misery, and remorse. Hordes of raucous sea lions, gathering on the beach for the mating season, eventually drove him to the island's interior. Once inland, his way of life took a turn for the better. More foods were available there: feral goats—introduced by earlier sailors—provided him with meat and milk, while wild turnips, the leaves of the indigenous cabbage tree and dried Schinus fruits (pink peppercorns) offered him variety and spice. Rats would attack him at night, but he was able to sleep soundly and in safety by taming and living near feral cats.

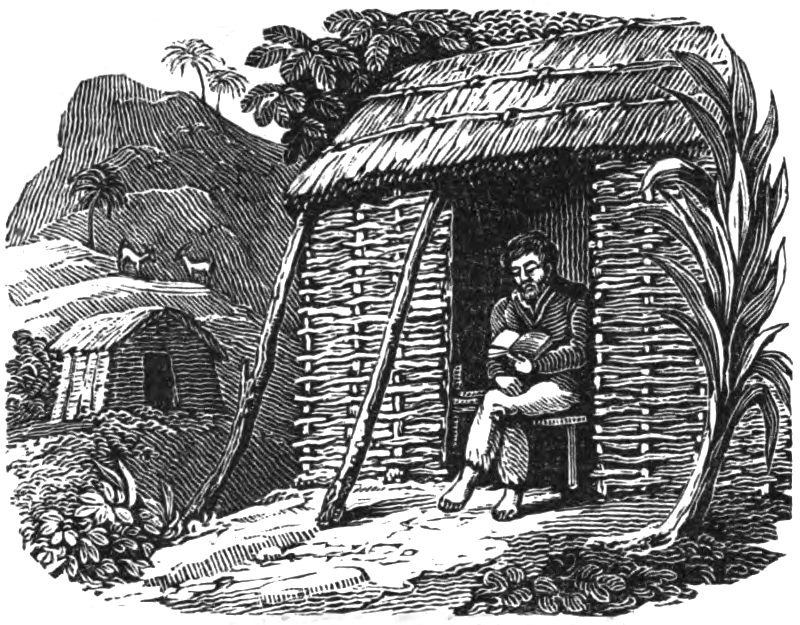
Selkirk reading his Bible in one of two huts he built on a mountainside

Selkirk proved resourceful in using materials that he found on the island: he forged a new knife out of barrel hoops left on the beach; built two huts out of pepper trees, one of which he used for cooking and the other for sleeping; and employed his musket to hunt goats and his knife to clean their carcasses. As his gunpowder dwindled, he had to chase prey on foot. During one such chase, he was badly injured when he tumbled from a cliff, lying helpless and unable to move for about a day. His prey had cushioned his fall, probably sparing him a broken back.

Childhood lessons learned from his father, a tanner, now served him well. For example, when his clothes wore out, he made new ones from hair-covered goatskins using a nail for sewing. As his shoes became unusable, he did not need to replace them, since his toughened, calloused feet made protection unnecessary. He sang psalms and read from the Bible, finding it a comfort in his situation and a prop for his English.

During his sojourn on the island, two vessels came to anchor. Unfortunately for Selkirk, both were Spanish. Being British and a privateer, he would have faced a grim fate if captured and therefore did his best to hide. Once, he was spotted and chased by a group of Spanish sailors from one of the ships. His pursuers urinated beneath the tree in which he was hiding but failed to notice him. The would-be captors then gave up and sailed away.

=== Rescue ===
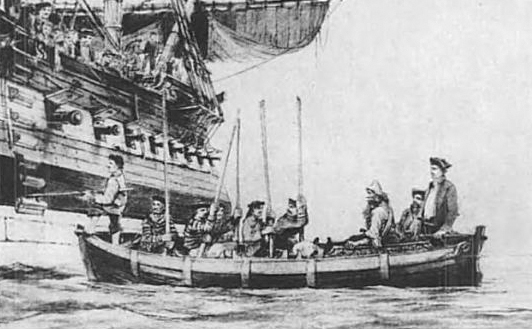
The rescued Selkirk, seated at right, being taken aboard Duke.

Selkirk's long-awaited deliverance came on 2 February 1709 by way of Duke, a privateering ship piloted by William Dampier, and its sailing companion Duchess. Thomas Dover led the landing party that met Selkirk. After four years and four months without human company, Selkirk was almost incoherent with joy. The Duke's captain and leader of the expedition was Woodes Rogers, who wryly referred to Selkirk as the governor of the island. The agile castaway caught two or three goats a day and helped restore the health of Rogers' men, who had developed scurvy.

Captain Rogers was impressed by Selkirk's physical vigour, but also by the peace of mind that he had attained while living on the island, observing: "One may see that solitude and retirement from the world is not such an insufferable state of life as most men imagine, especially when people are fairly called or thrown into it unavoidably, as this man was." He made Selkirk Duke's second mate, later giving him command of one of their prize ships, Increase, before it was ransomed by the Spanish.

Selkirk returned to privateering with a vengeance. At Guayaquil in present-day Ecuador, he led a boat crew up the Guayas River where several wealthy Spanish ladies had fled, and looted the gold and jewels they had hidden inside their clothing. His part in the hunt for treasure galleons along the coast of Mexico resulted in the capture of Nuestra Señora de la Encarnación y Desengaño, renamed Bachelor, on which he served as sailing master under Captain Dover to the Dutch East Indies. Selkirk completed the around-the-world voyage by the Cape of Good Hope as the sailing master of Duke, arriving at the Downs off the English coast on 1 October 1711. He had been away for eight years.

== Later life and influence ==
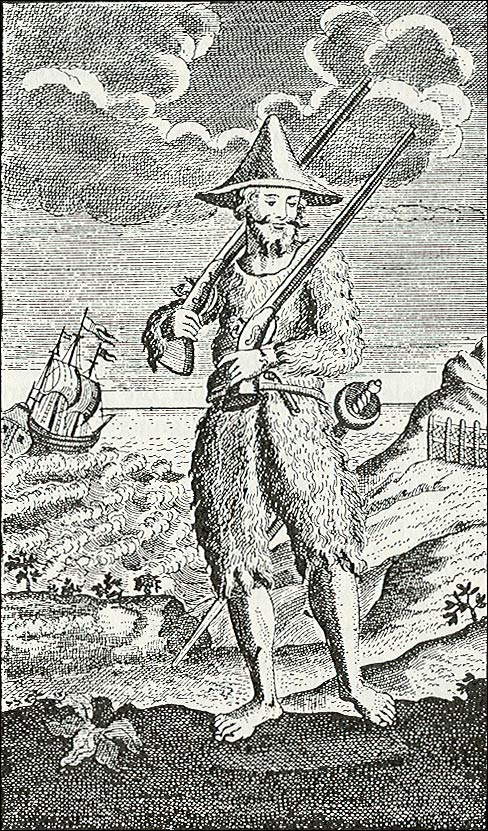
An illustration of Crusoe in goatskin clothing shows the influence of Selkirk

Selkirk's experience as a castaway aroused a great deal of attention in Britain. His fellow crewman Edward Cooke mentioned Selkirk's ordeal in a book chronicling their privateering expedition, A Voyage to the South Sea and Round the World (1712). A more detailed recounting was published by the expedition's leader, Rogers, within months. The following year, prominent essayist Richard Steele wrote an article about him for The Englishman newspaper. Selkirk appeared set to enjoy a life of ease and celebrity, claiming his share of Duke's plundered wealth—about £800 (equivalent to £140,000 in 2025). However, legal disputes made the amount of any payment uncertain.

After a few months in London, he began to seem more like his former self again. However, he still missed his secluded and solitary moments, remarking, "I am now worth eight hundred pounds, but shall never be as happy as when I was not worth a farthing." In September 1713, he was charged with assaulting a shipwright in Bristol and might have been kept in confinement for two years. He returned to Lower Largo, where he met Sophia Bruce, a young dairymaid. They eloped to London early and married on 4 March 1717. He was soon off to sea again, having enlisted in the Royal Navy. While on a visit to Plymouth in 1720, he married a widowed innkeeper named Frances Candis.

He served as an officer on board HMS Weymouth, engaged in an anti-piracy patrol off the west coast of Africa. The ship arrived near the mouth of the River Gambia in March 1721 and lingered due to damage from bad weather. The locals took several of the crew hostage and ransomed them for "gold and food". As the ship sailed down the coast of West Africa, men went into the forests to cut wood and began to contract yellow fever from the swarms of mosquitoes, and perhaps typhoid. Four died in June and, by September, "so many men were dying a makeshift hospital was erected on shore" near Cape Coast Castle. Selkirk became sick in November with the same symptoms as his crewmates. He died on 13 December 1721 along with shipmate William King, and both were buried at sea; three more died the following day.

When Daniel Defoe published The Life and Surprising Adventures of Robinson Crusoe (1719), few readers could have missed the resemblance to Selkirk. An illustration on the first page of the novel shows "a rather melancholy-looking man standing on the shore of an island, gazing inland", in the words of the modern explorer Tim Severin. He is dressed in the familiar hirsute goatskins, his feet and shins bare. Yet Crusoe's island is located not in the mid-latitudes of the South Pacific but 4,300 km (2,700 mi) away in the Caribbean, where the furry attire would hardly be comfortable in the tropical heat. This incongruity supports the popular belief that Selkirk was a model for the fictional character, but most literary scholars now accept that he was "just one of many survival narratives that Defoe knew about".

== In other literary works ==
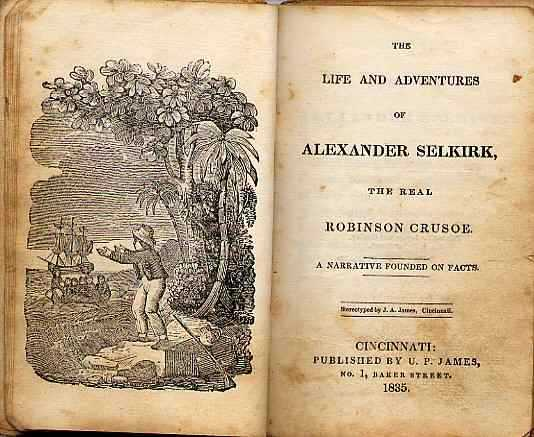
Title page from The Life and Adventures of Alexander Selkirk, the Real Robinson Crusoe (1835), by an unknown author

- William Cowper's "The Solitude of Alexander Selkirk" is about Selkirk's feelings as the castaway who lived all alone on the island. This poem gave rise to the common phrase "monarch of all I survey" via the verse:
  I am monarch of all I survey,
  My right there is none to dispute;
  From the center all around to the sea,
  I am the lord of the fowl and the brute.
- Jorge Luis Borges wrote a sonnet named after Selkirk. In it, Selkirk wakes from a dream of the island to find himself "returned to the world of men", and thinks of his past, castaway self as a separate person he wishes to comfort.
- Charles Dickens used Selkirk as a simile in Chapter Two of The Pickwick Papers (1836): "Colonel Builder and Sir Thomas Clubber exchanged snuff-boxes, and looked very much like a pair of Alexander Selkirks—'Monarchs of all they surveyed.'" This is also a reference to William Cowper's poem.
- Poet Patrick Kavanagh likens his loneliness on the road to that of Selkirk, in his poem "Inniskeen Road: July Evening":
  Oh, Alexander Selkirk knew the plight
  Of being king and government and nation.
  A road, a mile of the kingdom, I am king
  Of banks and stones and every blooming thing.
- In "Etiquette", one of W. S. Gilbert's Bab Ballads, Selkirk is used as a model for the English castaways:
  These passengers, because they clung to a mast,
  Upon a desert island were eventually cast.
  They hunted for their meals, as Alexander Selkirk used,
  But they couldn't chat together—they had not been introduced.
- Joshua Slocum mentions Selkirk in the book Sailing Alone Around the World (1900). During his visit to the Juan Fernández Islands, Slocum runs across a marker commemorating Selkirk's stay.
- Diana Souhami draws on testimony from Selkirk and many others in her Selkirk's Island (2001), from a journey to rescue to arrival home and inspiration for the prolific Daniel Defoe.
- In Allan Cole and Chris Bunch's Sten science fiction series, Book Two, The Wolf Worlds, the Scottish character Alex bemoans their predicament after crash landing: "'A slack way for a mon,' Alex mourned to himself. 'Ah, didnae ken Ah'd ever been Alex Selkirk.'"

== In film ==
Selkirk, the Real Robinson Crusoe is a stop motion film by Walter Tournier based on Selkirk's life. It premièred simultaneously in Argentina, Chile, and Uruguay on 2 February 2012, distributed by The Walt Disney Company. It was the first full-length animated feature to be produced in Uruguay.

== Commemoration ==
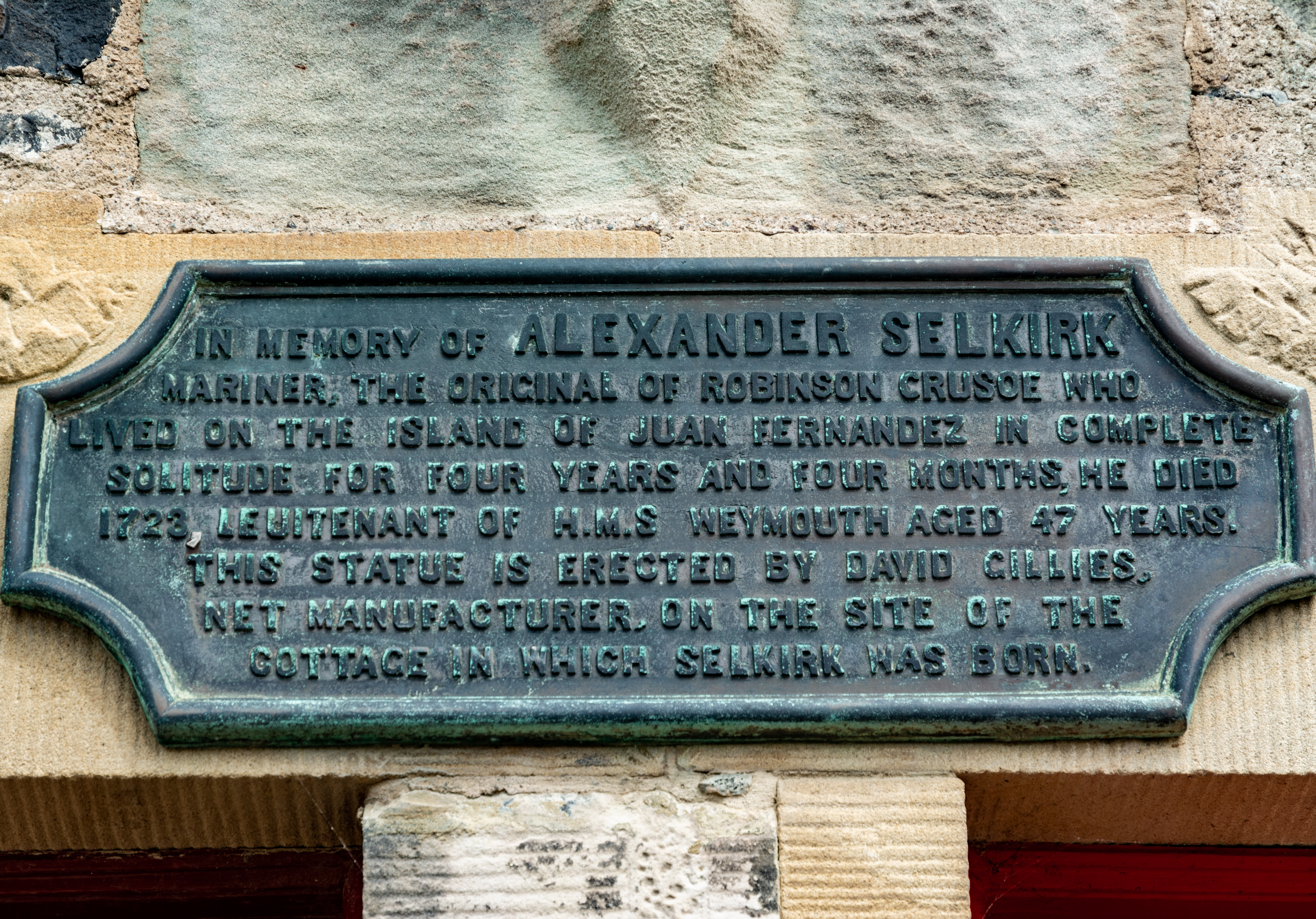
Plaque for Selkirk in Lower Largo, Scotland, which reads: "In memory of Alexander Selkirk, mariner, the original of Robinson Crusoe who lived on the island of Juan Fernández in complete solitude for four years and four months. He died 1723 [sic], lieutenant of HMS Weymouth, aged 47 years [sic]. This statue is erected by David Gillies, net manufacturer, on the site of the cottage in which Selkirk was born."

Selkirk has been memorialized in his Scottish birthplace. Lord Aberdeen delivered a speech on 11 December 1885, after which his wife, Lady Aberdeen, unveiled a bronze statue and plaque in memory of Selkirk outside a house on the site of his original home on the Main Street of Lower Largo. David Gillies of Cardy House, Lower Largo, a descendant of the Selkirks, donated the statue created by Thomas Stuart Burnett.

The Scotsman is also remembered in his former island home. In 1869 the crew of HMS Topaze placed a bronze tablet at a spot called Selkirk's Lookout on a mountain of Más a Tierra, Juan Fernández Islands, to mark his stay. On 1 January 1966 Chilean president Eduardo Frei Montalva renamed Más a Tierra Robinson Crusoe Island after Defoe's fictional character to attract tourists. The largest of the Juan Fernández Islands, known as Más Afuera, became Alejandro Selkirk Island, although Selkirk probably never saw that island since it is located 180 kilometres (110 miles; 100 nautical miles) to the west.

== Archaeological findings ==
An archaeological expedition to the Juan Fernández Islands in February 2005 found part of a nautical instrument that likely belonged to Selkirk. It was "a fragment of copper alloy identified as being from a pair of navigational dividers" dating from the early 18th (or late 17th) century. Selkirk is the only person known to have been on the island at that time who is likely to have had dividers and was even said by Rogers to have had such instruments in his possession. The artifact was discovered while excavating a site not far from Selkirk's Lookout where the famous castaway is believed to have lived. In 1825, during John Howell's research of Alexander Selkirk's biography, his "flip-can" was in the possession of his great-grand-nephew John Selkirk, and Alexander's musket was "in the possession of Major Lumsden of Lathallan."

== See also ==
- List of people who disappeared mysteriously at sea
