= List of survival games =

The following is a representative list of games classified in the survival genre.

== Legend ==
Video game platforms
AMI	Amiga	APPIIE	Term not found	ATR26	Atari 2600, Atari 2800
ATRST	Atari ST, Atari Falcon	CPC	Amstrad CPC	DOS	PC DOS / MS-DOS, Windows 3.X
DROID	Android	DS	Nintendo DS, DSiWare, iQue DS	GBC	Game Boy Color
iOS	iOS, iPhone, iPod, iPadOS, iPad, visionOS, Apple Vision Pro	LIN	Linux, SteamOS	MAC	Classic Mac OS, 2001 and before
NX	(replace with NS)	OSX	macOS	PCJR	IBM PCjr
PS1	PlayStation 1	PS2	PlayStation 2	PS3	PlayStation 3
PS4	PlayStation 4	PS5	PlayStation 5	PSP	PlayStation Portable
PSV	PlayStation Vita	Quest	Meta Quest / Oculus Quest family, including Oculus Rift	SNES	Super NES / Super Famicom / Super Comboy
Stadia	Google Stadia	TH1	First generation Thomson computers	Wii	Wii, WiiWare, Wii Virtual Console
WiiU	Wii U, WiiU Virtual Console	WIN	Windows, all versions Windows 95 and up	WIN3X	Term not found
WMO	Windows Mobile	X360	(replace with XB360)	XOne	(replace with XBO)
XSX/S	(replace with XBX/S)				

Types of releases
Compilation	A compilation, anthology or collection of several titles, usually (but not always) belonging to the same series
Early access	A game launched in early access is unfinished and thus might contain bugs and glitches or have some of the content missing
Episodic	An episodic video game that is released in batches over a period of time
Expansion	A large-scale DLC to an already existing game that adds new story, areas and additions and/or changes to the game's mechanics
Full release	A full release of a game that launched in early access first
Limited	A special release (often called "Limited" or "Collector's Edition") with bonus collector's material. Often provided to people who pre-order a game
Port	The game first appeared on a different platform and a port was made. The game is like the original, with few or no differences
Remake	The game is an enhanced remake of an original, made using a new engine and/or assets and thus containing completely new sound, graphics and possibly changes to the story and/or gameplay
Remaster	The game is a remaster of an original, released on the same or different platform, with (usually minor) changes to graphics, sound and/or gameplay
Rerelease	The game was re-released on the same platform with no or only minor changes

== List ==
Year	Title	Developer	Platform	Notes
1982	Survival Island	Starpath	ATR26	
1985	The Oregon Trail (1985 video game)	MECC	APPIIE, DOS, WIN3X, MAC, WIN	
1985	Wilderness: A Survival Adventure	Titan Computer Products	DOS, PCJR, MAC	
1986	Sapiens (video game)	Didier Guillion, Olivier Guillion	CPC, ATRST, DOS, TH1, MAC, WIN, OSX	
1992	The Lost Tribe	Lawrence Productions	DOS	Educational strategy.
1992	UnReal World	Enormous Elk	WIN	
1993	Burntime	Max Design	DOS, AMI	
1993	SOS	Human Entertainment	SNES	
1994	Robinson's Requiem	Silmarils	WIN, ATRST, AMI	
1996	Corpse Party	Kenix Soft	PC-9801	
1996	Deus	Silmarils	DOS, WIN	Sequel to Robinson's Requiem.
1996	Tail of the Sun	Artdink	PS1	
1999	Schiffbruch	Dirk Plate	WIN	Game info, aka. Shipwreck.
1999	Survival Kids	Konami	GBC	
2000	Survival Kids 2: Dasshutsu!! Futago Shima!	Konami	GBC	
2001	Survival: The Ultimate Challenge	Techland Sp. z o.o.	WIN	
2002	Disaster Report	Irem	PS2	
2003	Stranded	Unreal Software	WIN	
2003	Notrium	Ville Mönkkönen	WIN	
2004	Metal Gear Solid 3: Snake Eater	Konami	PS2	
2005	Lost in Blue	Konami	DS	
2005	Pathologic	Ice-Pick Lodge	WIN	
2006	Raw Danger!	Irem	PS2	
2007	Lost in Blue 2	Konami	DS	
2007	Lost in Blue 3	Konami	DS	
2007	The Sims 2: Castaway	Electronic Arts	DS, PS2, PSP, Wii, WMO	
2007	Stranded II	Unreal Software	WIN	
2008	Lost in Blue: Shipwrecked	Konami	Wii	
2008	The Sims Castaway Stories	Electronic Arts	OSX, WIN	
2009	Zettai Zetsumei Toshi 3: Kowareyuku Machi to Kanojo no Uta	Irem	PSP	
2010	Luanti (Formally Minetest)	Minetest team	WIN, LIN	
2011	Junk Jack	Pixbits	DROID, iOS, LIN, OSX, WIN, NX	
2011	Minecraft	Mojang	DROID, iOS, LIN, OSX, WIN, PS3, PS4, PSV, WMO, WiiU, X360, XOne	
2011	Terraria	Re-Logic	WIN, LIN, OSX	
2012	I Am Alive	Ubisoft Shanghai and Darkworks	WIN, PS3, X360	
2012	Infestation: Survivor Stories	Hammerpoint Interactive	WIN	Ex-The War Z. Delisted 2016. Rebooted as Infestation: The New Z (2016).
2012	Miasmata	IonFX	WIN	
2013	7 Days to Die	The Fun Pimps	LIN, OSX, WIN, PS4, XOne, PS5, XSX/S	In early access.
2013	Cataclysm: Dark Days Ahead	Kevin Granade, CleverRaven	DROID, iOS, LIN, OSX, WIN	Open source version. Has a 2023 commercial edition.
2013	Day One: Garry's Incident	Wild Games Studio	WIN	Delisted soon after launch in 2013. Store page removed from Steam in early 2018.
2013	DayZ (mod)	Dean Hall	WIN	
2013	Don't Starve	Klei Entertainment	LIN, OSX, WIN, WiiU, NX, PSV, PS3, PS4, XOne, iOS, DROID	
2013	How to Survive	EKO Software	WIN, PS3, PS4, WiiU, X360, XOne	
2013	Project Zomboid	The Indie Stone	WIN, OSX, LIN	In early access. Original alpha release in 2011.
2014	NEO Scavenger	Blue Bottle Games	WIN, OSX, LIN, iOS, ANDROID	
2014	Nether	Phosphor Games, Pure FPS	WIN	Survival horror. 2013 early access release. Delisted 2015.
2014	Rising World	JIW-Games	WIN, OSX, LIN	Still in early access since 2014, circa 2024.
2014	Survivalist	Bob the Game Development Bot	X360, WIN	Survival horror.
2014	This War of Mine	11 bit studios	WIN, OSX, LIN, iOS, ANDROID, PS4, PS5	
2015	Dyscourse	Owlchemy Labs	LIN, OSX, WIN	
2015	Forsaken Isle	Smoodlez	WIN	In early access.
2015	H1Z1: Just Survive	Daybreak Game Company	WIN	Early access release only. Delisted in late 2018.
2015	Kingdom (video game)	Thomas van den Berg and Marco Bancale	WIN	
2015	Life is Feudal: Your Own	Bitbox	WIN	
2015	Novus Inceptio	McMagic Productions	WIN	In early access.
2015	Planetbase	Madruga Works	WIN, OSX, XOne, PS4	City-builder.
2016	Force of Nature	A.Y.std	WIN	
2016	No Man's Sky	WIN, OSX, PS4, XOne, NX, PS5, XSX/S	Has procedural space with countless planets.	
2016	Scrap Mechanic	Axolot Games	WIN	In early access.
2016	Starbound	Chucklefish	WIN	
2016	The Flame in the Flood	The Molasses Flood	WIN, OSX, PS4, XOne, NX	
2016	Wayward	Unlok	WIN, LIN, OSX	In early access.
2017	Ark: Survival Evolved	Studio Wildcard / Instinct Games	iOS, LIN, OSX, WIN, PS4, XOne, NX, Stadia	
2017	Darkwood	Acid Wizard Studio	WIN, OSX, LIN, XOne, PS4, NX, Stadia, XSX/S, PS5	Survival horror.
2017	Life is Feudal: Forest Village	Bitbox	WIN	Survival town builder.
2017	The Culling	Xaviant Games	WIN	Delisted in early 2019.
2017	The Long Dark	Hinterland Studio	LIN, OSX, WIN	
2017	Unturned	Smartly Dressed Games	LIN, OSX, WIN, PS4, XOne, XSX/S	
2018	Conan Exiles	Funcom	WIN, PS4, XOne, XSX/S	
2018	Dead in Vinland	CCCP	WIN, OSX, LIN, NX	
2018	Dead Maze	Atelier 801	LIN, OSX, WIN	
2018	Frostpunk	11 Bit Studios	WIN, OSX, PS4, XOne	City-builder.
2018	Z1 Battle Royale	Daybreak Game Company	WIN, PS4, XOne	Original name for 1st early access release in 2016: H1Z1: King of the Kill. Spun off from original H1Z1 (2015) in 2016.
2018	Maia	Machine Studios	WIN, LIN, OSX	Colony sim with a first person mode.
2018	Metal Gear Survive	Konami	WIN, PS4, XOne	Has both "story" and multiplayer modes
2018	Miscreated	Entrada Interactive	WIN	
2018	RimWorld	Ludeon Studios	LIN, OSX, WIN	
2018	Rust	Facepunch Studios	WIN, PS4, XOne	
2018	Salt	Lavaboots Studios	WIN	Has sailing.
2018	SCUM	Gamepires	WIN, XOne, XSX/S	In early access.
2018	Subnautica	Unknown Worlds Entertainment	OSX, WIN, NX, PS4, PS5, XOne, XSX/S	
2018	Surviving Mars	Haemimont Games	WIN, OSX, LIN, PS4, XOne	City-builder.
2018	TerraTech	Payload Studios	WIN, LIN, OSX, NX, XOne, PS4	Vehicular game.
2018	The Forest	Endnight Games	WIN, PS4	Survival horror.
2018	Vintage Story	Anego Studios	WIN, LIN, OSX	Early access release in 2016.
2018	We Happy Few	Compulsion Games	LIN, OSX, WIN, PS4, XOne, XSX/S	
2019	Astroneer	System Era Softworks	WIN, XOne, PS4, NX	Early access release in 2016.
2019	Dawn of Man	Madruga Works	WIN, OSX, PS4, XOne	City-builder.
2019	Flotsam	Pajama Llama Games	WIN	Post-apocalyptic town builder. In early access.
2019	Green Hell	Creepy Jar	WIN, NX, PS4, XOne, XSX/S	
2019	Nether: The Untold Chapter	Fredaikis AB	WIN	Survival horror.
2019	Planet Nomads	Craneballs Studio	WIN, OSX, LIN	
2019	The Wild Eight	Eight Points	LIN, OSX, WIN, PS4, XOne	
2019	Vigor	Bohemia Interactive	NX, PS4, PS5, XOne, XSX/S, WIN	
2019	Ylands	Bohemia Interactive	WIN, OSX, LIN, DROID, iOS	
2020	CrossWorlds: Escape	Another Reality	WIN	2016 early access release.
2020	Empyrion - Galactic Survival	Eleon Game Studios	WIN	
2020	Night of the Dead	Jackto Studios	WIN	Tower defense mix.
2020	Survivalist: Invisible Strain	Bob the Game Development Bot	WIN	Sequel to Survivalist (2014). In early access.
2021	Breathedge	Redruins Softworks	WIN, NX, PS4, PS5, XOne, XSX/S	
2021	Chernobylite	The Farm 51	WIN, XOne, PS4, XSX/S, PS5	Survival horror.
2021	Dice Legacy	DESTINYbit	WIN, NX, XOne, PS4, XSX/S, PS5	Roguelike city-builder with dice rolls.
2021	DYSMANTLE	10tons	WIN, OSX, LIN, NX, XOne, PS4, XSX/S, PS5, DROID, iOS	Post-apocalyptic, base building ARPG.
2021	Endzone: A World Apart	Gentlymad Studios	WIN, PS5, XSX/S	Post-apocalyptic survival city-builder.
2021	Force of Nature 2: Ghost Keeper	A.Y.std	WIN	Sequel to Force of Nature.
2021	Siege Survival: Gloria Victis	Black Eye Games, Fish Tank Studio	WIN	Managerial survival.
2021	Surviving the Aftermath	Iceflake Studios	WIN, NX, PS4, XOne, XSX/S	Sequel to Surviving Mars.
2021	Valheim	Iron Gate Studio	LIN, WIN, XOne, XSX/S	In early access.
2021	Wanderlost (announced)	Eli Segal	WIN, XOne, PS4, NX	
2022	25°N 71°W	SE {} KS	WIN	
2022	Captain Bones: A Pirate's Journey	World of Poly	WIN	Pirate sim. In early access.
2022	Card Survival: Tropical Island	WinterSpring Games	WIN, OSX, iOS	Card game.
2022	Floodland	Vile Monarch	WIN	Post-apocalyptic survival city-builder.
2022	Grounded	Obsidian Entertainment	WIN, XOne, XSX/S	
2022	Keplerth	TARO	WIN	Original 2018 early access name: Keplerth: Another World.
2022	Raft	RedBeet	WIN, OSX, LIN	
2022	Salt 2: Shores of Gold	Lavaboots Studios	WIN	Sequel to Salt (2018). In early access.
2022	Starsand	Tunnel Vision Studio	WIN, NX, XOne, PS4, XSX/S, PS5	
2022	Stranded Deep	BEAM Team Games	LIN, OSX, WIN, XOne, PS4, NX	Has marine activities & gyro flying.
2023	Above Snakes	Square Glade Games	WIN	Old West theme. *Console releases planned.
2023	Harmonic Depths	Override	WIN	Animal sim.
2023	Life is Feudal: MMO	Bitbox	WIN	2023 relaunch on ltg.com after prior beta shut down. MMORPG.
2023	Osiris: New Dawn	Fenix Fire Entertainment	WIN	
2023	Stranded: Alien Dawn	Haemimont Games	WIN, XOne, PS4, XSX/S, PS5	Survival colony sim.
2023	Sunkenland	Vector3 Studio	WIN	Has underwater diving. In early access.
2023	Surviving The Abyss	Rocket Flair Studios	WIN	Managerial survival. In early access.
2023	The Lord of the Rings: Return to Moria	Free Range Games	WIN, XSX/S, PS5	Based on Middle-earth lore.
2023	Under A New Sun	New Horizon Games	WIN	Stranded Deep clone. Has marine . In early access.
2024	Enshrouded	Keen Games	WIN, XSX/S, PS5	In early access.
2024	Frostpunk 2	11 Bit Studios	WIN, PS5, XSX/S	Sequel to Frostpunk.
2024	Infection Free Zone	Jutsu Games	WIN	Survival city-builder. In early access.
2024	Nightingale	Inflexion Games	WIN	In early access.
2024	Pacific Drive	Ironwood Studios	WIN, PS5	Has regular driving.
2024	Palworld	Pocket Pair	WIN, XOne, XSX/S	In early access.
2024	Smalland: Survive the Wilds	Merge Games	WIN, XSX/S, PS5, Quest	Similar to the FernGully animated films.
2024	Survival: Fountain of Youth	Odinsoft Inc.	WIN, XSX/S, PS5	Has sailing.
2024	Sons of the Forest	Endnight Games	WIN	Sequel to The Forest.
2024	TerraTech Worlds	Payload Studios	WIN	Sequel to TerraTech. In early access.
2024	The Planet Crafter	Miju Games	WIN	2022 early access.
2024	V Rising	Stunlock Studios	WIN, PS5	
2025	Survivalist: Invisible Strain	Bob the Game Development Bot	WIN, XSX/S	
2025	The Last Caretaker	Channel37	WIN	In early access.
2026	Casualties: Unknown	Orsoniks	WIN, LIN, OSX	In demo.
