= Nether (video game) =

2013 video game

- Developer(s): Phosphor Games (until 2013, briefly 2015); Pure FPS (2013-2015)
- Publisher(s): Nether Productions
- Platform(s): Microsoft Windows
- Release: WW: October 29, 2013
- Genre(s): Action, Indie, Massively Multiplayer, RPG
- Mode(s): Multiplayer

Nether is a first-person multiplayer survival game for Windows. It was developed by American studio Phosphor Games, and was first available on October 29, 2013. Nether became popular in late 2013, when many YouTubers such as Markiplier were uploading videos of them playing the game. Nether has often been compared to other similar sandbox survival games such as 7 Days to Die and Rust, and contained early Extraction Shooter genre features, such as 'safe zone' hubs to safely extract the loot acquired in session into 'stashes'.

== Gameplay ==
Nether is a first-person, multiplayer, survival game, where the player must survive in a landscape based loosely on Chicago (where the developers are based). Players must scavenge the world for supplies and fight off the evil monsters that are hunting for them, known as the Nether. However, monsters are not the only danger to players; players are also a danger to each other. Players can fight over items as well as territory. A server can have up to 64 players. A map has up to 150 blocks of houses, with wasteland beyond the city.

The player spawns just outside the ruins of an abandoned city, equipped only with a knife as a means of protection. On the player’s HUD are their health, which ranges from 0 to 1000, a compass, a stamina bar, as well as a hydration bar. The stamina bar will start depleting once the player begins to sprint, but will regenerate when they rest. The hydration bar will deplete over time, so the player must search for food and water to scavenge. As the player starts to explore the seemingly abandoned buildings in the city, they will encounter various new weapons that they can pick up and use. These include melee weapons, such as knives and swords, as well as firearms of different types. All firearms require specific ammunition, which is also found throughout the world.

The game also features an inventory system. In the inventory, the player can store eight items in a backpack, as well as separate slots for ranged, sidearm and melee weapons, which the player can choose from the backpack to put into one of the slots as their active weapons. There is also, however, a weight limit of 50 lb, which the player must keep track of when acquiring new items. Additional slots on the HUD are assigned for medications and health items that the player can use quickly when needed.

There is also a currency system in the game. As the player explores more, they will start encountering paper money on the ground, which can be used to buy better weapons, as well as medications from a vendor found at a specific place in the city.

The city contains many 'safe zones', which feature as a way for the player to safely extract and upgrade their gear into player account stashes, and is similar to the "risk/ reward" mechanics of Extraction Shooter genre.

As the player explores more, they will eventually come across monstrous beings that seem to be the only inhabitants of the abandoned city. These creatures, known as the Nether, will track and hunt down the player and will do anything possible to kill them. The creatures tend to produce growling noises, which the player can hear if near one. That is usually an indicator that the Nether have spotted the players and are preparing an attack. Once the creatures spot the player, they will teleport closer to them, from a random direction. Basic creatures only damage the player via physical melee attacks, whereas stronger ones possess more powerful attacks.

Players can also encounter other players in the server, which make up the only other human inhabitants of the desolated city. Players can choose whether they want to collaborate and survive together or fight against each other for the scarcely available resources.

== Reception ==
The game received mixed-to-negative reviews, holding a 57/100 metacritic score.

== Developers ==
Phosphor Games Studio is a Chicago-based game development studio. Other games they have developed are The Dark Meadow and Horn. They worked on Nether but were replaced by Pure FPS while still in early access.

=== Development ===
The game was delisted from the Steam PC store sometime after its servers were pulled down in 2015.
