= CDDA =

CDDA may refer to:

- Circularly disposed dipole array, a large circular antenna used by the military
- Compact Disc Digital Audio (CD-DA), an audio recording format
- Company Directors Disqualification Act 1986, a piece of UK company law, which sets out the procedures for company directors to be disqualified in certain cases of misconduct.
- Common Database on Designated Areas, a database of the European Environment Agency (EEA) about nationally designated sites, nature protection sites such as national parks and nature reserves
- Cataclysm: Dark Days Ahead, an open-source post-apocalyptic survival roguelike video game
