= Stranded II =

2007 video game

- Developer: Unreal Software
- Publisher: Unreal Software
- Designer: Peter Schauß
- Platform: Microsoft Windows
- Release: December 2005 (public Alpha); June 2007 (full release)
- Genres: Action-adventure, survival
- Mode: Single-player

Stranded II is a 3D action-adventure survival video game developed by the German independent studio Unreal Software and released in June 2007. It is a sequel to the original Stranded. As in its predecessor, the player assumes the role of a castaway stranded on a deserted island, where the primary objective is to survive by gathering resources, crafting tools, and overcoming environmental hazards before ultimately escaping the island and returning home.

The game was released as freeware and is available for download from its official website and the developer's website.

A sequel, Stranded III, is currently in development.

== History and development ==
Like its predecessor, Stranded II was developed using the Blitz3D game engine. Following the unexpected success of the original Stranded, Peter Schauß began development on the sequel in late 2003. The game entered a public alpha testing phase in December 2005, with the final version released in June 2007.

Schauß released a final update for the game in 2008, after which development ceased as he shifted his focus to Counter-Strike 2D. Several years later, the source code for Stranded II was released under the GNU General Public License before being relicensed a few days later under the Creative Commons Attribution-NonCommercial-ShareAlike license.

== Gameplay ==
Compared with its predecessor, Stranded II features enhanced graphics, an expanded selection of items, tools, and weapons, and introduces new gameplay mechanics such as taming animals and setting certain environmental objects on fire. The game also includes a campaign mode that follows the player's journey across multiple islands. Despite these additions, the core gameplay remains largely unchanged, retaining the survival mechanics of the original game.

In addition, Stranded II includes scripting capabilities that allow users to create custom scripted maps. These tools enable creators to incorporate narrative elements through character dialogue, quests, scripted events, and cutscenes.

One of the primary design goals of Stranded II was to simplify the creation of user modifications through its scripting system and editable object definition files. Community-created modifications range from expanding the game's selection of items, such as Extension Mod and Massive Mod, to introducing entirely new settings, as seen in Lost in Space. By adding new content and gameplay possibilities, these modifications significantly expand the game's mechanics and enhance its replay value.

== Reception ==
Stranded II received generally positive reviews from critics and was well received by players following its release. Games Finder awarded the game a score of 7.5 out of 10, describing it as "a free-to-play survival experience that is both simple and incredibly fun", and concluding that "you can’t look past Stranded II".
