= Epifrog =

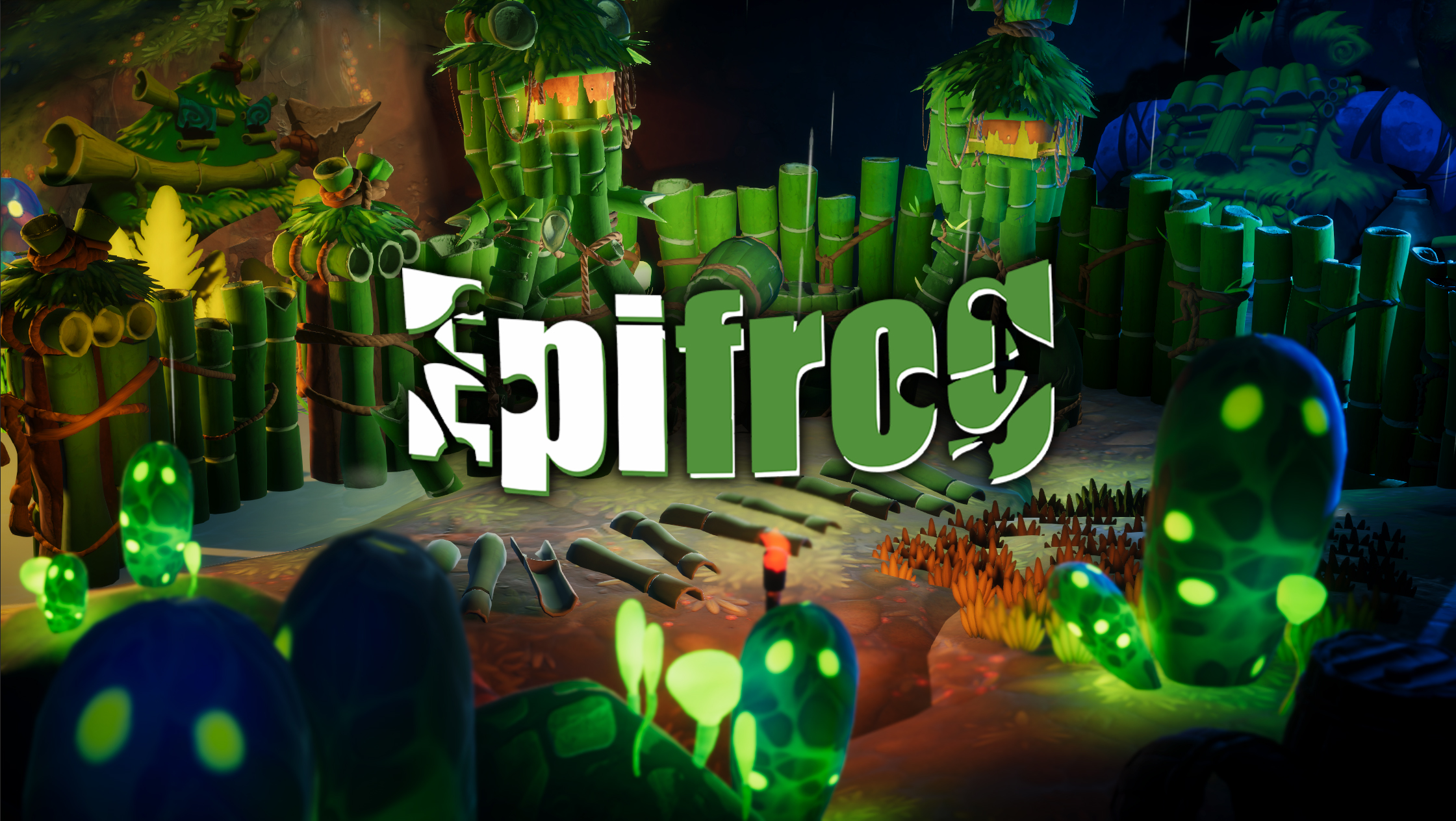
- Developer: Adria Games
- Publisher: Forever Entertainment
- Engine: Unity
- Platforms: Nintendo Switch; Windows
- Genres: Survival, strategy, adventure
- Mode: Single-player

Epifrog is a 2.5D adventure/survival video game developed by Adria Games and published by Forever Entertainment with strategy elements set in a grotesque world of frogs and magic. The game is based on Unity. It is planned to release on Windows via Steam and Nintendo Switch.

== Gameplay ==
Epifrog is a 2.5D survival/strategy game. Players have to take care of frogs in the village, craft, build and upgrade things, explore the wilderness and most importantly defend the village from filthy U'man waves.

While exploring the world there are a lot of dangers out there - poisonous spiders and blood-thirsty werewolves who are waiting to devour innocent frogs. The player's task is to protect the village, fight back against U'mans, explore the wilderness and do what it takes to survive.

The important part is protecting the Magic Pond Statue where tadpoles grow and keep U'mans away from the tadpoles.

The core of the game mechanics is commanding. The player becomes Epifrog who is leading his frog troops. They can issue commands, making their kin charge into an attack, defend the designated position, approach it or run away. Each command has a more powerful version which buffs his party members according to the action they perform. In the village, our magic pond is where all the tadpoles live. Epifrog can feed them, allowing them to grow into different forms, depending on the provided ingredients. Players will gather their party, and explore the wilderness outside the village where they will find valuable resources which help them expand the village and make their troops stronger and fill their belly with tasty frog berries.

Every so often during the night, waves of U'mans will attack the frog village. Players can assign a sentinel to the frog gong who will alarm the village and mobilize all frogs. Furthermore, it is possible to set annoying obstacles like carnivore plants that will bite incoming U'mans or sticky bubbles that will immobilize them. Epifrog has a special kick ability, which allows it to kick other frogs in order to draw something from the inventory, activate a lot of buildings or interact with the environment.

== Development and release ==
Epifrog is developed by Adria Games, an independent game development studio based in Poland.

Epifrog is distinguished by a grotesque character placed in a fairytale world. It is visually created by a consistent, hand-drawn style regardless of whether it is a 2D character, 3D objects, magic or environmental effects. The right atmosphere is attained thanks to the color palette created by light and postprocessing during the day and night cycles and carefully crafted sounds. Inspirations came from cartoons that clearly show the intentions of the characters in an exaggerated way thanks to the shapes, animations and sounds which Epifrog represents.

It is planned to release on Microsoft Windows via Steam and Nintendo Switch.
