= Day One: Garry's Incident =

2013 video game

- Developer: Wild Games Studio
- Publisher: Wild Games Studio
- Designer: Stephane Woods
- Programmers: Thomas Rabouin; Luc Lessard; Frederic Bohn; Rejean Leclerc; Marc Renaud; Maxime Charbonheru; Stephane Woods
- Artists: Armel Gaulme; James Christopher Fauvelle; Maxime T. Bourque; Frederic O'Aoust; Melissa Lachance
- Composer: Francois-Xavier Dupas
- Engine: Unreal Engine 3
- Platform: Microsoft Windows
- Release: WW: 25 September 2013
- Genres: First-person shooter, survival horror, survival
- Mode: Single-player

Day One: Garry's Incident is a PC survival game developed and published by Wild Games Studio in Mascouche, Québec, Canada and released on 25 September 2013. The game received primarily negative reviews from critics for its unstable and unpolished gameplay, including TotalBiscuit, who published his review on YouTube; Wild Games Studio then had the video taken down using the site's automated copyright complaints system. In response, TotalBiscuit uploaded a response/follow-up video claiming that the copyright complaint was part of a deliberate attempt to censor online criticisms. After receiving negative attention for their copyright complaint, the game's developers apologized and withdrew the complaint. The developers were also accused of astroturfing online reviews on Metacritic.

== Plot ==
The protagonist in Day One: Garry's Incident is Garry Friedman, a middle-aged British pilot, whose wife and daughter have recently been killed in an accident. Depressed by the death of his family members, Garry begins drinking heavily and accepting dangerous assignments. While he is transporting cargo for a research facility in Yellowstone National Park, Yellowstone Caldera erupts, causing him to lose control of the plane. An artifact in the cargo causes him to be transported to the Amazon rainforest, where he discovers an ancient civilization and struggles to survive.

== Gameplay ==
Gameplay mostly consists of fighting various enemies, mostly indigenous human tribes, throughout a jungle environment, using a variety of artefacts, melee weapons, and firearms. A rudimentary eating and drinking system is also present.

== Reception ==
=== Controversy ===
On 1 October 2013 John Bain, a video game critic known online as TotalBiscuit, The Cynical Brit, published a critical review of Day One: Garry's Incident on YouTube, saying that the game was "horrendous". The game's developer, Wild Games Studio, alleged that Bain had violated its copyrights. The company argued that Bain should not have been able to earn advertising revenue from a video based largely on gameplay footage from their copyrighted work. They filed a copyright infringement complaint through YouTube and the video was removed through its automated takedown system.

This led to allegations that the company was abusing YouTube's copyright system in a deliberate attempt to censor online criticisms. Steam users and professional reviewers pointed out that nearly all online video game reviews are funded by advertising and feature game content. Critics also noted that no other online reviews of the game were given similar notices. It was also pointed out that many Steam users had similar criticisms towards the game's quality. Bain later published a response video, which reached two million viewers within three days, where he alleged Wild Games Studio was abusing copyright laws to censor his criticisms. He also alleged the company manipulated their Kickstarter campaign to make it seem that it had more support than it did by having the CEO of the company pledge $10,000 upfront, and having others pledge high amounts and withdraw them later.

According to TechDirt, the incident was an example of the Streisand effect, whereby attempts to censor criticism only draws more attention to it. In response to objections to its tactics in online communities, Wild Games Studio apologized and withdrew their copyright complaint.

Wild Games Studio was also accused of astroturfing; posting fake reviews on Metacritic to increase the game's average review rating. Critics noted that a large number of recently created accounts gave the game positive reviews without posting anything else on the site. The studio denied being involved and suggested it may have been one of a number of players that contacted them offering to "help" with negative online reviews.
