= The Planet Crafter =

2024 video game

- Developer: Miju Games
- Publisher: Miju Games
- Engine: Unity
- Platforms: Windows; PlayStation 5; Xbox Series X/S
- Release: April 10, 2024
- Genre: Survival
- Modes: Single-player, multiplayer

The Planet Crafter is a 2024 open-world survival video game developed and published by the French studio Miju Games. It was initially released for Windows and was later ported to PlayStation 5 and Xbox Series X/S. The game allows players to freely explore a large environment while managing resources and working to survive and progress. The player controls a convict who scavenges barren planets and their moons to gather resources, construct machines, and transform the environment.

Two developers initially created the game before the team grew to seven members over the course of production. It entered early access, a funding model that allows players to purchase and play unfinished games, on March 24, 2022, and was officially released on April 10, 2024. In October 2024, Miju Games released the first downloadable content pack (DLC)—an optional expansion—for the game, titled "Planet Humble". This was followed by "The Moons Update" in May 2025, which added two more celestial objects to terraform, and "Toxicity" in November 2025. In April 2026, Miju Games released the "2.0 update", and PlayStation 5 and Xbox Series X/S versions were released in July 2026.

The Planet Crafter received generally positive reviews, with critics praising its relaxing gameplay and freedom to pursue different goals. Reviewers also criticized the limited variety of environments and aspects of the game's interface and controls. Player reception was similarly favorable, and the game sold over one million copies by June 2024 and two million copies by June 2026.

== Gameplay ==
A partially-terraformed environment in The Planet Crafter

The Planet Crafter is a single-player and multiplayer open-world survival game in which players control an astronaut and can explore multiple barren worlds while terraforming them, a process that involves transforming a hostile environment into one that can support life. This involves modifying environmental features such as the atmosphere, temperature, and ecology. Early exploration is constrained by a finite oxygen supply. The player can die from a lack of oxygen, thirst, or starvation. The player character, the avatar controlled by the player, wields a multi-tool device, referred to as a "matter-manipulation gun."

The player's objective is to increase the Terraformation Index (TI), a metric that tracks planetary progress towards complete terraformation. This is accomplished by constructing machines, such as drills, heaters, and "vegetubes," that increase global levels of oxygen, temperature, and atmospheric pressure to modify the planet's atmosphere. As these measurements increase, the global ecology shifts to support plant and animal life. Machines require power to operate, and in the early stages of the game, this power is generated by wind turbines. Deeper into the game, solar panels and nuclear reactors are used to generate power, and these generators can be placed anywhere on the planet and still power machines regardless of where they are placed. Machines and buildings can be constructed by going into a crafting menu, requiring only that the player has the necessary materials in their inventory. The option to leave the planet (which ends the game) or to travel to nearby planets and moons both require the player to reach the final terraformation stage.

== Plot ==
The player assumes the role of a convict sentenced by the corporation Sentinel Corp to terraform a hostile planet. The player character awakens in a crashed spacecraft on Planet Prime with limited supplies needed to make the planet habitable. Throughout the game, the player receives informational messages from Riley, an ally located off-world, through a transmission screen. The communications reveal that the player and Riley have met in the past. Riley's messages provide information about the planet, previous expeditions, and possible ways for the player to escape. Planet Prime is littered with the remains of previous settlers who did not survive.

Automated messages from Sentinel Corp get sent to the player through the transmission screen. The messages reveal the corporation's involvement in the terraforming mission and provide information on the player's status and the planet's condition. Near the completion of terraformation, the final messages indicate that Sentinel Corp is monitoring the player's progress.

Remnants of an ancient civilization known as the Wardens are scattered across Planet Prime, often inside locked ruins. These ruins can be opened using Warden's Keys, of which ten are available throughout the game. Collecting all ten keys grants access to artifacts left by the planet's previous inhabitants. Messages left by the Wardens reveal that the planet was once habitable and that their civilization was destroyed by a catastrophic event. The event caused widespread damage to the planet's ecosystem and atmosphere, leaving behind the ruins discovered by the player.

The game features three possible endings: Subjection, Subservience, and Subversion. In Subjection, the player leaves the planet under Sentinel Corp's control; in Subservience, Riley arranges a paid extraction with smugglers to help the player escape; and in Subversion, the player leaves through the Wardens Portal.

== Development ==
=== Early development and announcement ===
Development of The Planet Crafter began as a two-person project and later expanded to a seven-member team. The game was developed by Miju Games, an independent studio founded in 2019 and based in southern France. The studio's first title, Abracadabrew, received little attention, prompting the team to begin work on a new project. Work on The Planet Crafter began in December 2020.

The game uses the Unity game engine, a system where creators can develop video games, and drew inspiration from survival games such as Subnautica, The Long Dark, and Don't Starve Together, as well as automation-focused games such as Factorio and Universal Paperclips, in which systems perform tasks automatically rather than manually. During development, the team's challenge was defining the game's scope. The Planet Crafter: Prologue, a standalone early version showcasing the game's early stages and key mechanics, was released on Steam on December 19, 2021, ahead of the full game.

=== Early access and full release ===
The game entered early access on March 24, 2022, allowing players to access an unfinished version while development continued, with its programmers and artists working fully remotely. During this period, Miju Games released an update that expanded the game's features. The developers also published development roadmaps that outlined future plans and ongoing support during the early access period.

The Planet Crafter was released on April 10, 2024, for Windows via Steam and GOG.com, digital distribution platforms for video games. The 1.0 version included cooperative multiplayer for up to ten players, new biomes (distinct environmental regions), and other features. To promote the game's release, Miju Games sponsored popular streamers to play the game, increasing its visibility and number of players.

=== Post-release updates ===
The game's soundtrack, composed by Benjamin Young, was released on April 12, 2024. Miju Games released the "Planet Humble" downloadable content (DLC) for the game on October 9, 2024; the new world is approximately half the size of the original game.

In April 2025, Miju Games announced a major update titled "The Moons Update", a major update adding two moons that become accessible after completing the terraforming of the initial planet. Each moon can also be terraformed, with players retaining all equipment from their previous progress, and resources can be transferred between planets and moons. Following the release of "Planet Humble", the developer acknowledged player feedback, stating that the expansion met expectations in some areas but fell short in others. Miju Games planned to continue refining both planets and provide additional free updates, while stating that future downloadable content was possible but the primary focus would remain on improving the original game.

In November 2025, another downloadable content pack for the game, titled "Toxicity", was released. In March 2026, Miju Games announced a major update for The Planet Crafter, which the studio described as the "2.0" update due to the scale The update was released in April 2026. In June 2026, Miju Games announced that the game would be released for PlayStation 5 and Xbox Series X/S. The console versions were released in July 2026.

== Reception ==
=== Critical response ===
Reception

Aggregate scores
Aggregator	Score
Metacritic	81/100
OpenCritic	85% recommend

Review scores
Publication	Score
GameStar	86/100
IGN	7/10
GamingBolt	8/10
CGMagazine	8/10
TechRaptor	7.5/10

The Planet Crafter received generally favorable reviews. Critics praised its terraforming mechanics, progression, and gameplay, while criticizing its limited early-game content. It holds a Metacritic score of 81/100. Review aggregator OpenCritic reported strong approval, being recommended by 85% of critics.

Critics praised the game's terraformation system, describing it as a key part of the experience. Writing for IGN France, Erwan Lafleuriel commended the game's rewarding systems while stating that additional balancing and content could further improve the experience. Matt Cox of PC Gamer praised the feel of being "responsible for such radical changes" in the game, while Enrico Marx of GameStar compared the experience to the film The Martian, characterizing it as a relaxing sandbox game. James Cunningham of Hardcore Gamer praised the "satisfying progression" of the game.

Critics also focused on the gameplay loop—the recurring cycle of actions and rewards in a game—and the survival mechanics. Ravi Sinha of GamingBolt praised its addictive loop of exploration, resource gathering, and progression, as well as its audiovisual presentation. In another review from Hardcore Gamer, James Cunningham rated the game an 8 out of 10, praising the game's progression system and sense of transformation, describing the gameplay loop as rewarding. However, some reviewers found the early stages of the game lacking; Sinha pointed to a sparse early game and limited map variety, while Lafleuriel suggested that the experience could be further improved with better game balancing, which is the adjustment of a video game's rules and systems.

The game's technical and narrative depth received more mixed commentary. Writing for CGMagazine, Justin Wood praised the breadth of possibilities while stating the absence of a strong endgame objective or a cohesive narrative. Similarly, Robert Adams of TechRaptor lauded the automation systems, but identified "odd design quirks" including building misalignment, a glitch where buildings do not snap together perfectly. While Jonathan Bolding of PC Gamer commended the game's weather effect and environmental hazards, he also criticized its basic gameplay and sound. Reflecting on the game's popularity, Luis Teschner of GameStar argued that The Planet Crafter deserved its success on Steam.

=== Player reception and sales ===
Player reception was highly positive. Prior to its full release, the game earned a 96% "Overwhelmingly Positive" rating from Steam users, indicating that at least 95% of more than 500 user reviews were favorable. According to estimates from Steam Spy, a third-party tracking service for PC games, the game sold over 500,000 copies a few months after release. The game maintained its "Overwhelmingly Positive" rating after release. In June 2024, the developers announced that The Planet Crafter had sold over one million copies. In June 2026, the developers announced that the game had sold over two million copies.

After the release of the "Planet Humble" DLC, TechRaptor reported that the positive reception encouraged Miju Games to continue supporting The Planet Crafter, with updates aimed at expanding and enhancing the game's content.
