= Infection Free Zone =

2024 video game

- Developer: Jutsu Games
- Publisher: Games Operators
- Engine: Unity
- Platform: Windows
- Release: April 11, 2024 (early access)
- Genres: City-building game, survival
- Mode: Single-player

Infection Free Zone is a post-apocalyptic survival city-building game developed by Jutsu Games and published by Games Operators for Windows. It was released for early access on April 11, 2024.

== Gameplay ==
The player can play at any map based on real world location. The game map uses 3D alteration of real world map data from OpenStreetMap.

== Plot ==
At some time in the modern world, the plague dubbed "Mad Virus" appeared "out of nowhere" and began turning people feral and hostile to all other living beings. In the next few weeks, chaos emerges and societal order collapses worldwide. The intro cinematic shots hint to the beginning outbreak occurring somewhere in Northern Europe. Doomsday preppers banded together to live underground and form a stockpile of materials. For at least several years, they would live in their bunkers. As supplies became scarce and life support systems began failing, an automated radio frequency declared that the infected population was declining and encouraging survivors to form new settlements. Regardless of what map players choose, they will always start in April 2030.

As players continue developing their society they will continue to encounter other groups in the wasteland, including merchants, wandering migrants, bandits, signs of increasing intelligence within the infected, infected animals, and military factions, largely through the use of radio.

Players may choose to turn off Story events and/or Illness Events upon creating their base. Doing this will disable radio events(excluding migrants) and the intro cinematic.

== Development ==
The demo version of the game titled Infection Free Zone – Prologue was released on October 19, 2023, for Steam. In this demo, player can play at six major cities, including Paris and Cambridge, for eight days in-game duration only.

== Reception ==
Reception

Aggregate score
Aggregator	Score
Metacritic	(PC) TBD/100

Review scores
Publication	Score
PC Invasion	7.5/10
Strategy and Wargaming	8/10

The early access version of the game received mixed reviews upon release. Ed Smith of PCGamesN described it as mixing Cities Skylines 2 with Dying Light and Frostpunk. Aidan Lambourne of PC Invasion praised the game post-apocalyptic setting stating it as "simulate the apocalypse anywhere in the world", but criticize the gameplay survival experience by saying "a thrilling yet average zombie survival experience".
