= The Last Caretaker =

Upcoming survival crafting video game

- Developer: Channel37
- Publisher: Channel37
- Engine: Unreal Engine 5
- Platform: Windows
- Release: 6 November 2025 (early access)
- Genre: Survival
- Mode: Single-player

The Last Caretaker is a first-person survival crafting video game developed and published by Finnish studio Channel37. The game entered early access for Windows on 6 November 2025 through Steam and the Epic Games Store.

In the game, the player controls the last active Caretaker, an autonomous robot that awakens on a flooded post-apocalyptic Earth. The Caretaker's objective is to recover human seeds, restore the Lazarus Complex, grow new humans and launch them into orbit in order to continue the survival of humanity.

== Gameplay ==
The Last Caretaker combines first-person exploration, survival, crafting, base-building, resource management and combat. Players explore a world covered by ocean, scavenge materials from abandoned structures and use them to craft tools, weapons, power networks and production modules.

The game begins in a derelict sea-based facility known as Sanctuary 37. Early progression focuses on restoring power, repairing systems and expanding the player's ability to explore. As players advance, they unlock vehicles and discover new points of interest across the world map.

Resource management is a central part of the game. Players must decide whether to use materials for weapons and defence, infrastructure, exploration tools or long-term mission progress. Combat involves rogue machines, hostile systems and environmental hazards.

The main progression loop is based around recovering human seeds, growing them at the Lazarus Complex and launching them into orbit. This requires players to restore and maintain the infrastructure needed for ectogenesis, power generation, resource processing and launch operations.

== Setting and story ==
The Last Caretaker is set on a future Earth largely covered by ocean after ecological collapse. Humanity no longer survives on the surface, and the player character is a robot left behind with a directive to preserve the species.

The story is revealed through exploration, mission progression and environmental storytelling. As the player restores facilities and investigates abandoned sites, the game gradually reveals the history of the world, the fate of humanity and the purpose of the Caretaker system.

== Development ==
Channel37 was founded in Helsinki, Finland, at the end of 2021 by a group of game industry veterans, including CEO and co-founder Miika Aulio and co-founders Vesa Halonen, Antti Ilvessuo and Sami Saarinen. The team's background includes experience at studios such as Ubisoft RedLynx, Mind Echoes and Second Order. The studio has fewer than ten employees. Channel37 is backed by Finnish mobile game company Supercell.

The Last Caretaker is Channel37's debut game. The game is built using Unreal Engine 5. The game was publicly announced in February 2025. It launched in early access for Windows on 6 November 2025 on Steam and the Epic Games Store. The studio stated its intention to keep the game in early access for at least 12 months, with the exact timeframe depending on development progress and player feedback.

Several major updates have been released since launch:

- Update 01: Last Humans
- Update 02: Ocean – The Final Frontier
- Update 03: Curiosity Wakes
- Update 04: Below Us
- Update 05: New Horizons
- Update 06: The Jump

== Reception ==
The Last Caretaker received attention for its premise, atmosphere and ocean-based survival setting. GamesMarket described the game as standing out in a crowded genre, praising its exploration and crafting elements and its atmosphere of loneliness.

On Steam, the game has received a "Very Positive" user rating, with 85% of 7,404 English-language reviews rating it positively as of June 2026.

At the Finnish Game Awards 2026, organised by the Finnish Game Developers' Studios Association and Neogames Finland, The Last Caretaker won the award for Best Finnish Game of 2025. The award was selected through a member vote covering nearly 100 commercial Finnish games released in 2025.

According to an interview with co-founder Antti Ilvessuo published by Finnish national broadcaster Yle, the game had sold hundreds of thousands of copies while still in early access and generated just under seven million euros in gross revenue during its first two months on sale.
