= Flotsam (video game) =

Upcoming video game

- Developer: Pajama Llama Games
- Publisher: Stray Fawn Publishing
- Engine: Unity
- Platform: Windows
- Release: December 5, 2025
- Genres: Survival, City-building
- Mode: Single-player

Flotsam is a survival city-building video game developed and published by Pajama Llama Games, which released in early access on September 26, 2019. It was previously published by Kongregate, and is now published by Stray Fawn Publishing. The game left early access and was fully released on December 5, 2025.

== Gameplay ==
Flotsam is a townbuilding survival game. The player starts with a group of stranded survivors in a flooded world and guides these survivors through the world while recycling all the garbage that is found in the ocean.

== Development ==
Flotsam is developed by Ghent-based indie studio Pajama Llama Games. The game released in early access on Steam, Kartridge, GoG and Humble Bundle September 26, 2019.

== Reception ==
During development Flotsam has already won several prizes.

Date	Category	Location
2017	Grand Prix	White Nights, Prague
2017	Best Game Design	White Nights, Prague
2018	Rising Star	IndieArenaBooth, Gamescom, Cologne
2019	Most Promising Belgian Game	Belgian Game Awards, Kortrijk
2019	Best Unity Game	IndieArenaBooth, Gamescom, Cologne
