= Casualties: Unknown =

2026 video game

- Developer: Orsoniks
- Publisher: Oro Interactive
- Engine: Unity
- Platform: Windows
- Release: November 9, 2026
- Genre: Survival game

Casualties: Unknown, also known by its former name Scav Prototype, is a survival video game created by Polish indie developer Orsoniks and published by Oro Interactive. The game was released on November 9, 2026.

== Gameplay ==
Casualties: Unknown is a two-dimensional single-player cave-exploration survival game where the player controls an artificially-created anthropomorphic test subject, called an Experiment, on a fictional hostile planet. The player is tasked with retrieving cargo lost by their human captors by descending down cave "layers". Each layer increases in difficulty and introduces additional hazards the player must avoid, such as traps, dangerous substances, creatures or steep falls. The game includes eleven procedurally-generated underground layers. The general theming, contents, and their order are the same every time the game is played, but the exact layouts of the layers are generated randomly.

The game features a simulated limb and cardiovascular system, requiring the player to bandage wounds, treat infections and manage blood loss to avoid losing consciousness. The player character's mental state, or mood, is tracked as a survival mechanic alongside physical injury. Having a too-low mood can cause self-harm events of various severity, from clawing their own arm to ripping out their own eye.

The game has character traits that the player can improve over a run: intelligence, strength and resilience. There are three unique playable characters, roughly 300 collectible items, and adjustable loot and danger settings accessible from the main menu.

== Development and release ==
Casualties: Unknown is developed by Orsoniks. The game began as a small personal project that gained a wider following after early alpha builds were distributed for free on the platform itch.io, with the publisher reporting that the game had surpassed 300,000 players on that platform prior to its Steam debut.

The first public build of Casualties Unknown was released on itch.io on January 1, 2025, under the placeholder name Scav Prototype. A free demo of Casualties: Unknown, covering five of the game's planned eleven layers, was released on Steam on April 20, 2026, alongside a publisher-issued press release and trailer. IGN subsequently published an official demo launch trailer and a separate "full run" gameplay video for the title. The game was fully released on Steam on November 9, 2026, attracting over 1,500 reviews within its first day.

== Reception ==
Casualties: Unknown received a largely positive response on the basis of its free demo. Rock Paper Shotgun published a piece comparing the game to Noita. Writing for OpenCritic in a piece syndicated from TheGamer, journalist Josh Coulson identified Casualties: Unknown as the highest-rated demo of more than 8,500 available during the June 2026 Steam Next Fest, citing a score of 93.08 percent based on user reviews tracked by SteamDB, and described its core loop as combining cave exploration with the board game Operation. GamingOnLinux also rated the demo positively, calling its exploration and injury systems intense, though it noted that the user interface needed further work. Upon the game's full release, The Games Machine also rated it positively, although it criticized the difficulty in finding the cause of player deaths for making the game frustrating.
