= Dice Legacy =

2021 video game

- Developer: DESTINYbit
- Publishers: Ravenscourt; Maple Whispering Limited
- Engine: Unreal Engine
- Platforms: Windows; Nintendo Switch
- Release: WW: September 9, 2021
- Genres: City-building, real-time strategy, Survival game, Roguelike
- Mode: Single-player

Dice Legacy is a video game developed by DESTINYbit and published by Ravenscourt and Maple Whispering. It combines gameplay elements of city-building games and real-time strategy games, along with roguelike, survival mechanisms.

== Gameplay ==
Players control a village established on newly discovered land. The villagers, each of whom has a caste, are represented by dice. Rolling the die determines what jobs the villager can be assigned to, limited to the choices provided by their caste. Dice can be rerolled in case players need a specific job, but rerolling too many times causes villagers to become injured. Some buildings unlocked through the tech tree and some jobs can heal these villagers, or players can create new villagers by breeding the dice. Dice can be enhanced to give stronger bonuses by buildings, and it is possible to combine dice to create more powerful villagers, though this can lower the village's happiness. During winter, players must keep the villagers warm, which limits their effectiveness in collecting resources. Eventually, the villagers encounter a hostile village, which raids them. Players must conquer it to stop the raids, and the gameplay shifts more toward real-time strategy. Upon winning the game, additional leaders and more challenging scenarios are unlocked.

== Development ==
Dice Legacy was developed by DESTINYbit, a studio based in Ravenna, Italy. It was released on September 9, 2021, for Windows and the Nintendo Switch. Downloadable content, Corrupted Fates, was released for both platforms in April 2022.

=== Definitive Edition ===
Another edition, Dice Legacy: Definitive Edition, includes the base game, three major updates and an expansion called "Corrupted Fates". It was released for Xbox One, PlayStation 4, Xbox Series X and S and PlayStation 5 on May 26, 2023.

== Reception ==
Dice Legacy received mixed reviews on Metacritic. Tom Chick of PC Gamer called it "a smart, peculiar city builder that ends in a gruelling uphill battle against a rival city". Rock Paper Shotgun's reviewer, Sin Vega, said that she dislikes dice mechanics in games. Reflecting this bias, she said Dice Legacy is "an exercise in furious, tooth-grinding frustration". Commenting on the game's requirement to quickly improvise, Harvard Liu of Digitally Downloaded wrote, "Not all people will find this gameplay fun, but for those who like a touch of harsh realism in their strategic gameplay, Dice Legacy provides a worthy challenge." However, due to what he felt was a poor port, Liu recommended against the Switch version. Shaun Musgrave wrote in his review for TouchArcade, "Cut past the novel dice motif and you have a solid yet familiar simulation game."
