= Novus Inceptio =

- Developer: McMagic Productions s.r.o.
- Designer: Martin Markus Mastný
- Composer: Tomáš Oliva
- Engine: Unity
- Platform: Windows
- Release: October 5, 2015 (early access)
- Genre: Survival game
- Mode: Single-player

Novus Inceptio is an upcoming indie video game by McMagic Productions s.r.o. It is projected as a survival single player set in a post-apocalyptic world that mixes science fiction and fantasy theme. Early access started in October 2015.

== Development ==
The game is being developed by Martin Markus Mastný since 2012. It is inspired by Ultima Online, Star Wars Galaxies and Wurm Online. Mastný originally used Hero Engine from Star Wars: The Old Republic but went to Unity engine in 2013.

The game appeared on Steam Greenlight site in 2015. It took only a few days to pass through Greenlight process. Early access started on October 5, 2015. Mastný also expressed hope that the game could be finished in a few months after early access release. In 2020, five years since a few months after early access release the development had been abandoned. On November 18, 2022, the developer announced a WIP (more than 8 years after the start of the alpha and over 3 years of silence to the community), in which he also announced that the development would be resumed.

== Gameplay ==
The Game is set in a distant future when the planet has recovered from a global catastrophe. One of player's goals is to find out what caused the catastrophe along with rebuilding of the civilization. Player can use Superhuman powers to reach his goal.

When the game starts player has to survive so he has to get food and resources to make a shelter or better equipment. His Skills get better as he uses them. If player does not use a skill for a long time it worsens. Player is accompanied by a robot that can save his DNA and clone him which works as a save/load system.
