= The Wild Eight =

2019 video game

- Developer: Eight Points
- Publisher: HypeTrain Digital
- Director: Eduard Gotovtsev
- Producer: Ivan Belousov
- Engine: Unity
- Platforms: Windows, PlayStation 4
- Release: Windows: WW: October 3, 2019; PlayStation 4: NA: October 27, 2020; EU: October 27, 2020
- Genre: Survival
- Modes: Single-player, multiplayer

The Wild Eight is a survival game developed by Eight Points and published by HypeTrain Digital. Players control people stranded in the harsh wilderness of Alaska and must cooperate to survive.

== Gameplay ==
Screenshot

The Wild Eight is a survival game with cooperative multiplayer. After a plane crash in the Alaska wilderness, up to eight survivors band together to assist each other in the inhospitable climate. To survive, players must craft tools and the basic necessities of life, such as shelter and a way to stay warm. Among other dangers, mutated wolves attack the players. Players who die respawn and can recover their equipment, which is dropped near their corpse. They can also cook and eat their own corpse. The Wild Eight can be played in single-player. The final release contains a story-driven campaign and quests.

== Development ==
The Wild Eight is the first big project for Eight Points, a developer in Yakutia, Russia. Eight Points launched a Kickstarter campaign for The Wild Eight to raise $50,000 and build a community around the game. The project was fully funded with 11 days of the campaign to go. A pre-alpha demo was released during the Kickstarter campaign. This version lacked multiplayer but was used to demonstrate the art style and gameplay, such as crafting and resource management. It entered early access in February 2017. In November 2017, Eight Points sold the game to publisher HypeTrain Digital, citing "internal conflicts". It left early access and was released for the PC on October 3, 2019, and for the PlayStation 4 in October 2020.

On December 11, 2023, The Wild Eight's Steam listing was updated to change the developer name back to Eight Points, which was renamed Fntastic in the meantime. Publisher HypeTrain Digital released a statement the next day that they changed the entry because they had terminated all business relations with the developer in 2017 and wanted to avoid a review bomb because of Fntastic's newest game The Day Before.

== Reception ==
=== Early access previews ===
Rock Paper Shotgun said the 2017 early access version they played was "definitely a game about watching meters". Commenting on the game's difficulty, the reviewer said he never survived long enough to find any quests. PC Gamer played The Wild Eight in 2018 and praised the art style. However, the reviewer said the hunger mechanic was frustrating, and the crafting requirements were "a little silly".

=== Post-release reviews ===
The PlayStation 4 version of The Wild Eight received "mixed or average reviews", according to review aggregator Metacritic.
