= Miasmata =

2012 video game

- Developer: IonFX
- Publisher: IonFX Studios
- Designers: Joe and Bob Johnson
- Engine: MILO
- Platform: Microsoft Windows
- Release: November 28, 2012
- Genres: Adventure game, survival
- Mode: Single-player

Miasmata is a survival and indie game developed by brothers Joe and Bob Johnson under the studio name IonFX. It was released on November 28, 2012, on the digital distribution platforms GOG.com and Steam, as part of their Steam Greenlight program. In the game, players assume the role of Robert Hughes, a plague-stricken scientist, as he explores a seemingly uninhabited island, seeking out medicinal plants in an attempt to find a cure.

== Gameplay ==
Miasmata is a first-person survival adventure game in which the player attempts to navigate an ailing protagonist across treacherous terrain and past an enigmatic threat in pursuit of medicinal plants or fungi that may cure him. The disease causes rapid dehydration if water is not regularly consumed, and while he does carry a small canteen, this is not enough for long trips inland or when stuck in the wilderness at night. Other threats include falling down steep cliffs and being stalked by the island's territorial creature. A small fall or coming close to drowning cause significant disorientation.

He can ameliorate the disease's effects by creating medication at research stations. Simple anti-fever tablets lowers the fever, but more complex concoctions can be constructed which permanently enhance his strength and agility which are helpful while exploring the dangerous island. Medicines can be produced by finding plants, taking them back to a research camp, and processing them into tablets and tonics.

The game features an intricate cartography system based on triangulation techniques. Areas can only be mapped after using triangulation to determine exactly where the character is relative to other landmarks. While looking at the map, he can fill in everything within line of sight by noting the relative locations of at least two other man-made objects. Although it is possible to navigate the island from memory, spending time fleshing out the map will prevent the character from becoming completely lost.

== Development ==
The indie game was developed over four years by two brothers Joe and Bob Johnson under the studio name IonFX. Joe Johnson developed an engine for the game called MILO.

== Reception ==
Miasmata

Aggregate score
Aggregator	Score
Metacritic	76

Review scores
Publication	Score
Eurogamer	7
GameSpot	7.5
IGN	7.9

The game garnered a 76% on the review aggregation website Metacritic. Rock, Paper, Shotgun concluded its review by saying that "while it may be overtly low-budget in some ways it damn well succeeds anyway. This is a plague you’ll want to catch". IGN wrote that "Surviving in Miasmata is not about the ending or the story it tries to tell, but the journey. The journey will be tough. The journey will be a trial of patience and will. The journey will be perhaps one of the most memorable you’ll have in a PC game this year."
