= Junk Jack =

2011 video game

- Developer: Pixbits
- Publisher: Pixbits
- Engine: Cocos2D
- Platforms: iOS; Windows; OSX; Linux; Android; Nintendo Switch
- Release: November 7, 2011
- Genre: Action-adventure

Junk Jack is an action-adventure sandbox video game by Italian developer Pixbits. It was released for iOS in 2011. A sequel, Junk Jack X, was released on August 29, 2013. Junk Jack X was renamed to Junk Jack, and the original game has been renamed to Junk Jack Retro.

== Gameplay ==
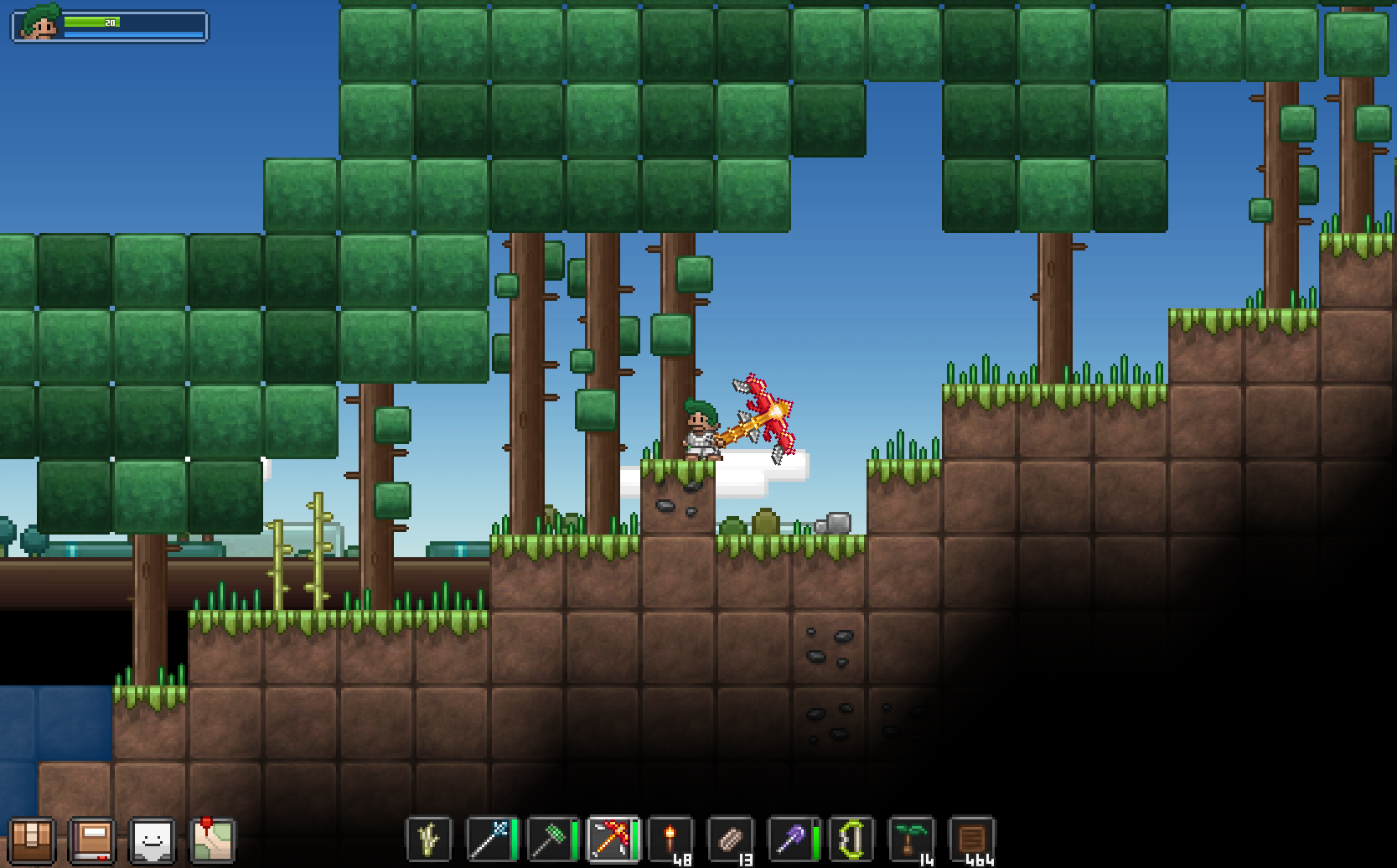
Screenshot

Junk Jack is a 2D sandbox game where the player collects resources and aims to explore and survive in a randomly generated environment full of treasures and hidden secrets, filled with biomes on the surface and underground.

== Development ==
The developer and coder is Jacopo Santoni (Jack), and the graphics/sfx artist is Silvio Eusebio (XsX). The pair met on multiplayer in Minecraft, and decided to collaborate on a similar game for the iPhone; at that point there were no iOS sandbox games.

== Reception ==
Junk Jack has a Metacritic rating of 85% based on 11 critic reviews.

Slide to Play described the game as fun and addictive, while 148Apps deemed it a must-own for lovers of the sandbox-crafting genre. Pocket Gamer noted that it had a high learning curve, but that it was enjoyable once the player eased into it. It even said it was better than Minecraft: Pocket Edition.

=== Junk Jack X ===
The game has a Metacritic rating of 83% based on 7 critic reviews.

Touch Arcade noted that it added new features to the sandbox, and built upon its prequels success, without drastically reinventing the genre. Pocket Gamer reasoned that the game wouldn't convert non-believers to the genre. Gamezebo appreciated the extra easing-in the game does to help keep players who may have left Junk Jack due to frustration over difficulty.
