= NEO Scavenger =

2014 video game

- Developer: Blue Bottle Games
- Publisher: Blue Bottle Games
- Designer: Daniel Fedor
- Composer: Josh Culler
- Platforms: Microsoft Windows, OS X, Linux, Android, iOS
- Release: WW: 15 December 2014
- Genres: Role-playing, roguelike
- Mode: Single-player

NEO Scavenger is a survival role-playing video game developed by Blue Bottle Games. The studio is led by Daniel Fedor, a former BioWare employee. In the game, the player controls a character that awakes in a cryonics laboratory in a ruined, post-apocalyptic world. The immediate objective of the game is to keep the character alive by finding food, clothing, and shelter, and caring for any illnesses that may befall him. Ruined towns can be scavenged for supplies, but doing so may draw the attention of nearby looters and raiders. Fighting for survival includes fending off attackers, and other beasts that may be hiding in the wastes. The developer had initially released a free browser-based demo, and tiered purchase options were available to access the beta and pre-order the final game. As of the final release in 15 December 2014, the demo and beta versions can no longer be accessed.

== Plot ==
The game is set in post-apocalyptic Michigan. In the game, Philip Kindred awakes from a cryosleep pod in a cryogenics lab, wearing nothing but a surgical smock, with a terrifying werewolf-like "Dogman" nearby.

== Gameplay ==
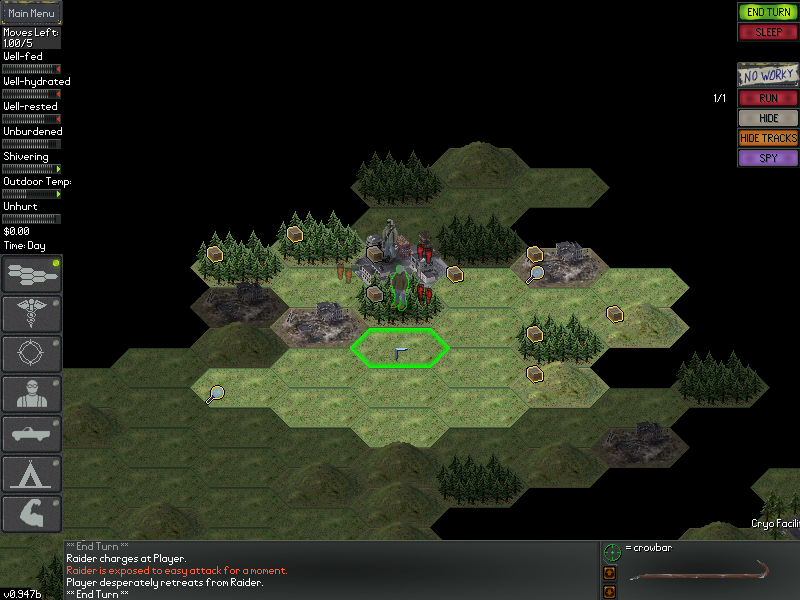
The main world for the game. Players can scavenge towns and kill enemy bandits to fight for survival in the wasteland.

NEO Scavenger is a post-apocalyptic outdoor survival simulation. The player controls a character through a series of turns (each turn equals an in-game hour) played on an isometric map divided into hexagonal tiles. During each turn, the character has a certain number of "moves". Each move makes the character hungrier, thirstier and more tired. The objective of the game is to ensure the character's survival. This requires that the player scavenge supplies from ruined settlements in the area. Scavenging can be risky as it may alert nearby looters and raiders to the player's activities, but it is necessary if the player wishes to survive in the wasteland; clothes, weapons, food, and tools quickly become a necessity for the wandering player. Recipes are available which require the player to gather certain items and combine them together to create other items.

The player can suffer from a variety of illnesses including hypothermia, diarrhea, dehydration, and malnutrition. Left untreated, the character could die. Illnesses can be treated or avoided by using certain items in the game. For example, to ward against hypothermia, the player should quickly obtain a pair of pants.

== Development ==
After leaving his job of seven years at BioWare, Daniel Fedor founded Blue Bottle Games and began working on his first independent project, NEO Scavenger. The game is inspired by other games he played as a child, particularly tabletop role-playing games including Advanced Dungeons & Dragons, Rifts, and Shadowrun: "I loved the creative problem solving, character creation, exploration, and later, character development and interaction."

PC Gamer's Tom Sykes compared the game to DayZ but without zombies and with a solitary player. The game uses elements from roguelikes, adventure games, and role-playing games. The developer tried to reduce the dependence on guns which typify the post-apocalyptic genre. Although players need to fend off attacking monsters, situations in the game such as hypothermia or dehydration also require the player's immediate attention.

Early versions of the game used a simple combat system that consisted of repeatedly clicking basic options such as "Use axe on looter" until either the looter or the player's character ran out of hit points. This system was replaced with a significantly more complex system that allows for actions such as grabbing an attacker's legs to pull them to the ground if you are already down. The winner of the fight is no longer based on hit points but on blood loss, shock, and other realistic causes. The AI also received updates prior to a preview in July 2012: mutant creatures still act aggressively, but humans are less likely to risk themselves in a fight if the player character has nothing of value to take.

Along with a free browser demo of the game, the developer sold pre-orders that include beta access to raise funds to finish development. The game was created using a number of different free programming libraries and tools: Flixel, FlashDevelop, TortoiseSVN, MySQL, Audacity, and Chevy Ray's AssetBatcher. The game was entered in the 2013 Independent Games Festival competition. The game was part of a Humble Bundle Weekly sale featuring games developed using Open Source tools.

== Reception ==
Reception

Aggregate score
Aggregator	Score
Metacritic	77

Review score
Publication	Score
IGN	7.9

Responses to Neo Scavenger were generally favorable, with Metacritic calculating a score of 77 based on 7 reviews.

IGN's Leana Hafer praised the game's storytelling and survival mechanics, but noted that the difficulty of these mechanics can get in the way of the player experiencing the story.

PC Gamer's Tom Sykes said of the game, "Compared to other post-apocalyptic RPGs, NEO Scavenger feels like the real deal, with a central character who lives the harsh life of a wastelander rather than simply borrowing the aesthetic."
