= SOS (1993 video game) =

- North American cover art
- Developer: Human Entertainment
- Publishers: JP: Human Entertainment; NA: Vic Tokai
- Designer: Keita Kimura
- Composers: Kouji Niikura; Hiroyuki Naka; Hiroshi Taniguchi
- Platform: Super NES
- Release: JP: May 28, 1993; NA: April 1994
- Genres: Survival; Adventure
- Mode: Single-player

SOS, known in Japan as Septentrion (セプテントリオン, Seputentorion), is a survival adventure video game developed and published by Human Entertainment in 1993 in Japan and published in 1994 by Vic Tokai for the Super NES in North America. A sequel to the game was later released in Japan for the PlayStation known as Septentrion: Out of the Blue.

== Story ==
The game presents itself as a "Syuji Yoshida film", and is displayed from the view of an audience watching a theatre. Mostly inspired by the 1969 book and 1972 film, The Poseidon Adventure, the story is set on September 13, 1921, and the players must escape the sinking ship Lady Crithania, which is hit by a gigantic wave and capsizes off the coast of Humbleton, England.

The game features four playable characters, each with a different story:

- Capris Wisher - An architect. This young man takes his younger stepsister, Amy Markarson, to the Lady Crithania. However, Amy's sickness becomes a severe hindrance to him. He's the most fit, and has an easier time exploring the capsized vessal, but has a rather blunt way of speaking that is perceived as rude by other passengers. This results in him having a harder time persuading survivors than the others.
- Redwin Gardner - A pastor (changed to counsellor in the US release), traveling with a family consisting of an unnamed mother and her children Stella and Harry Adams. Plus, Jack Hamilton, a nephew. His special skill is that Gardner possesses better persuasion and can recruit others to follow him that no other character can, but he has the most strict requirements to obtain the best ending.
- Jeffrey Howell - An affable senior doctor, he travels along with his wife Adela. Because he is a doctor he has ability to heal wounded survivors.
- Luke Haines - A crewman of the Lady Crithania. He suspects that the sea conditions are too much for the Lady Crithania to handle, much to the opposition of his superiors. He possesses the ship's map that enables him to better navigate paths.

At the end, an in-game credits roll displays the 'cast' alongside fictitious actor names, reinforcing the intro's metafiction story.

== Gameplay ==
An example of the main game screen. Luke Haines stands in a stairway before the tidal wave.

The player must escape from the ship within a one-hour time limit. The timer is hidden except when the player injures themselves, in which case they fall unconscious and lose five minutes of time. After a period of time, the ship begins to periodically tilt in the water and gradually fill with water.

The player can take up to seven other survivors, some of which have different value to each playable character, and all of them have different requirements in how to get to them and how to make them follow the player. Depending on how many survivors the player finds, who they are and how valuable they are to the character player selected, the ending will vary. The best ending for each character is obtained by escaping the boiler room, the final area of the game, with their sentimental person (Amy for Capris; Harry, Stella and Jack for Redwin; Ismay Carl Townsend for Luke; and Adela for Jeffrey) and over 25 "points" worth of survivors.

== Release ==
The game was released in Japan as Septentrion on May 28, 1993 for the Super Famicom. The game was released in North America April 1994, under the title S.O.S., and was published by Vic Tokai. It was followed up by the Japan-only release of Septentrion: Out of the Blue in 1999 for the Sony PlayStation.

== Reception ==
Reception

Review scores
Publication	Score
Computer and Video Games	70%
Edge	7/10
Electronic Gaming Monthly	8/10, 7/10, 7/10, 7/10, 7/10
Famitsu	9/10, 8/10, 7/10, 8/10
Game Players	75%
GameFan	65%, 63%, 82%, 52%
GamesMaster	74%, 80%
Official Nintendo Magazine	68/100
Super Play	88%, 83%
Total!	(UK) 80%, 81% (DE) 5+
Dengeki Super Famicom	7/10, 7/10, 7/10, 8/10
Hippon Super!	7/10
Marukatsu Super Famicom	8/10, 7/10, 8/10, 6/10
The Super Famicom	70/100
Super Gamer	88/100

According to Famitsu, SOS sold 2,572 copies in its first week on the market and 5,337 copies during its lifetime in Japan. The game received a 20.0/30 score in a readers' poll conducted by Super Famicom Magazine. It also received average reviews upon release. GamePro's Manny LaMancha said that the game's premise was compelling but marred by too many poorly designed segments. He summarized it as "a movie-like trek that has great ambience but hits some sticky spots along the way".
