= TerraTech =

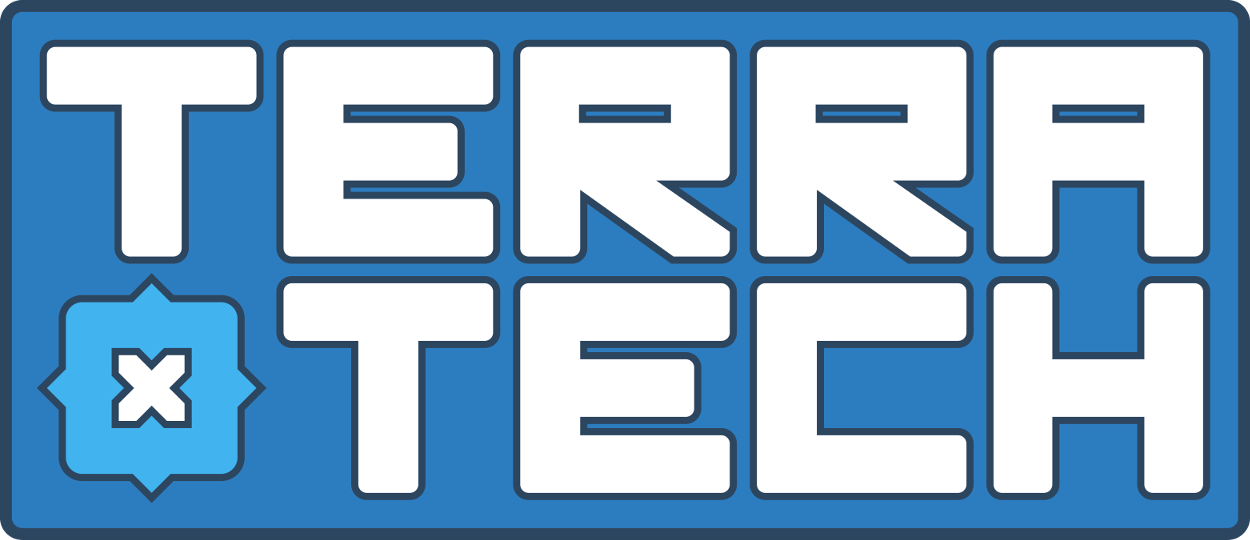
- Digital release logo
- Developer: Payload Studios
- Publisher: Payload Studios
- Platforms: Microsoft Windows, PlayStation 4, Xbox One, Nintendo Switch
- Release: Microsoft Windows, Xbox One; 10 August 2018; PlayStation 4; 14 August 2018; Nintendo Switch; 29 May 2019
- Genre: Construction sandbox game
- Modes: Single player Multiplayer

TerraTech is an open-world construction sandbox game with action elements created and released by British developer Payload Studios on 10 August 2018 for Windows and Xbox One and four days later for PlayStation 4. A port to Nintendo Switch by Lab42 was released on 29 May 2019. The game focuses on interplanetary mining operations. Players build and operate vehicles, called Techs, and stationary bases to extract resources and fight rival prospectors.

== Gameplay ==
The gameplay utilizes a construction sandbox focusing on vehicular combat and resource management. The game offers a variety of blocks with different functions that can be combined in various ways using attach points on each, with the control block–a cab–always serving as a centrepoint. Wheel blocks in contact with ground enable driving, while wing blocks generate lift for flying and other blocks provide additional functions to the tech they are attached to. Weapons deal damage, and shields protect from damage and/or apply effects, such as restoring part durability. Besides vehicles, the game enables construction of static bases anchored to the ground that are mainly used for storage and crafting. Blocks can be crafted using resources gathered from the environment and a system of resource silos, conveyors, and automatic factories (all blocks themselves). Such special components can excavate, process, transfer, and sell resources, but some of these work only on stationary builds called bases.

The environment consists of biomes, each with different objects such as trees and rocks. Destroying these provide resources, from wood to minerals. Veins can be found and exploited by building stationary mining equipment on top of them.

Trading stations in the world can sell players blocks, issue missions, and buy resources from players. Players can also sell resources with "delivery cannons" which blast resources into orbit where they are supposedly collected.

Multiple factions (called Corporations) exist in the game world, each having a distinctive style of blocks and associated playstyle. For example, GSO has starter-grade parts that don't have particular strength; GeoCorp focuses on heavy structures and mining technology, but doesn't produce ranged weapons; Venture produces light, high-speed vehicles; Hawkeye is focused on combat, providing superior weapons and armour; Better Future has a focus on futuristic technology, like advanced movement parts, control blocks and versatile weapons; and Reticule Research provides experimental weapons and equipment. The player is free to use blocks from all corporations in a single vehicle.

Several modes are available:

- Campaign: a loose storyline in which the player is an interplanetary prospector tasked to gather resources for famished Earth. The player starts with a cab and a handful of GSO blocks on a procedurally generated map, fighting rival prospectors and taking their blocks, unlocking and upgrading licenses of various factions which enable them to acquire higher-level blocks. In this mode, resources and blocks can be sold for the in-game currency "Block Bucks" and spent for purchasing new blocks.
- Creative: unlimited blocks and optional enemies, for building and testing constructions without having to acquire resources.
- Sumo: tech versus tech battles in an arena.

It is also possible to play online with other players.

== Development ==
The developers worked the concept into a playable demo in 2014 and presented it at indie games shows such as Rezzed, as well as actively promoted it through Steam, IndieDB, Twitch and other web platforms. A successful Kickstarter crowdfunding campaign followed after which an open beta was released as early access on the Steam platform. After a protracted development period, the version 1.0 was officially released in August 2018.

Despite being released, the game remains in active development, and several major new features are planned.

== Reception ==
"TerraTech is Digital LEGO Technic With Guns"

— Leon Hurley, Kotaku

Reviewers compared the gameplay to playing with Lego bricks, which they considered exciting and invoking of childhood memories. User interface, controls, and the game AI, on the other hand, were less commended. The reviewer for AbsoluteXbox was particularly critical of unintuitive camera controls, clumsy driving performance, and frustrating combat in the Xbox version.

== TerraTech Worlds ==
In March 2024, Payload released TerraTech Worlds in early access as a successor to and a "reimagining of" the original TerraTech release. The studio received funding from Tencent and used Unreal Engine 5. The game will include co-op and PvE game modes from the start, and also feature solo and offline play.

Payload laid off 25 employees in August 2024 but maintained that TerraTech and TerraTech Worlds would continue to be updated and maintained without interruption.
