= UnReal World =

1992 roguelike survival video game

- Steam cover art for UnReal World
- Developers: Sami Maaranen, Erkka Lehmus
- Publisher: Enormous Elk
- Designers: Sami Maaranen, Erkka Lehmus
- Platforms: Microsoft Windows, Mac OS X, Linux
- Release: WW: 1992
- Genres: Roguelike, survival
- Mode: Single-player

UnReal World is a roguelike survival freeware (shareware before 2013) video game set in a fictionalisation of Iron Age Finland. The game was first released in 1992 and continues to receive regular updates as of 2026. The game was released on Steam on 26 February 2016 and is also available at GoG.com.

== Gameplay ==
UnReal World features aspects from Finnish mythology and folklore; the game simulates a harsh environment where survival is the main challenge for most players. The player can choose from ten Finnish cultures with occupations including fisherman, hermit, trapper and tradesman.

The game has both real time and turn-based elements; unexpected events like a snowstorm and tornadoes can lead to a quick death of the player character. The game simulates a lot of details like frostbite of individual body parts. The player can roam freely in the world and interact with the different animals, vegetation and environment, such as by hunting, skinning, and constructing shelters.

The game shares many features in common with other survival games and RPGs, with a skill system, hunger system, and a game-play loop built around creating a character, acquiring resources and skills, and dying. To that end, UnReal World is a roguelike game that has players restart from nothing with a new character after every death in a new procedural generated world.

The graphics are simple 2D animated sprites; the direction of individual units is expressed with a small arrow. The game uses a fixed resolution of 800x600 pixels.

== Development ==
=== 1992: Initial release ===
The first major version of UnReal World was completed in 1992 and resembled a more traditional roguelike game (like ADOM). The ASCII game world was medieval fantasy with elves, orcs, mages, magic potions, and dungeons. Development of the game continued through 1995 and, along the way, saw a complete rewrite in C.

Features were established in the first releases that would become the essence of the modern game. These included varied combat options and aimed attacks, a split UI layout, open ended game play, random generation of wilderness, villages, and dungeons and their features, wilderness skills (such as fishing, tracking, and foraging), and the introduction of "early cultures" which replaced the high-fantasy style races and classes.

=== 1996–1998: Survival features ===
1996 saw the introduction of wilderness survival features, better sound and graphics, and a more developed historical setting. A climate system was added along with the necessary hideworking skill to buy and sell fur clothes and the ability to build shelters. Starvation became possible, and incidentally, many biogeographically accurate animals were also added, including bears, wolves, reindeer, beaver, salmon, foxes, burbot, ermines, and polecats.

Animals and items could now persist across the entire game world rather than be drawn conditionally when a player zoomed in to an area. The remaining high-fantasy elements were replaced by more realistic ones based on Iron Age Finnic mythology and culture. Additional NPC and playable cultures were added, completing the ten that still exist today. Sound effects and music first appeared and the graphics moved from ASCII- to a sprite-based display.

=== 1999: Transition from DOS to Windows ===
In 1999, the game moved from a DOS to a Windows-based architecture. This allowed significantly more memory to be used and eliminated Windows compatibility issues. The resolution was also increased. A version of the game named Iron-age Now was published on a CD-ROM and distributed to Finnish libraries as an educational tool.

=== 2000-2004: Cultural enhancements ===
Sami felt an "urge to dive deeper and deeper into cultural roots of ancient finns" in versions 2.40 to 2.80. Music and photos were added which reflected the primitive, iron-age setting and the traditions of the people who lived there. The monetary system was removed, "abundant imported goods" and metal goods were trimmed, new types of animal traps added, agriculture became possible for the player, and hideworking was expanded to allow the player to produce furs and leather. These changes further centered the gameplay on self-sufficiency.

=== 2005: Use of Simple DirectMedia Layer ===
The next technological leap for UnReal World occurred in 2005 when it was ported to native Windows, utilizing Simple DirectMedia Layer. This change enabled platform-independent development and better Windows compatibility but required a rewriting and redrawing of the majority of the game, including the upgrading of sounds and music. The new platform also enabled true color mode, where previously it was 256 colors (VGA) plus mouse support.

=== 2007-2009: World and AI expansion ===
Version 3 was introduced in 2007. The next two years of releases (until 3.11) brought more changes to the user interface, graphic style, and soundscape. The game world was made larger and optimized to run faster. Many tiles were redrawn and there were new terrain types added, as well as new plants, mushrooms, and berries. NPC and animal AI improvements expanded the dialogue options and allowed players to give orders to companions.

In 2009, the terrain system was overhauled and the AI for NPCs and animals was improved. The game world was expanded to six times as large as it was previously, and new terrain types and per-tile elevation were added. This release was considered by Sami as the "biggest core element overhaul[s] in [the] history of the game".

== Reception ==
UnReal World has been praised for its depth, realism, atmosphere and immersion, and value. In 2015, Rock, Paper, Shotgun listed UnReal World as the 26th best role-playing game on PC.
