= 7 Days to Die =

2016 video game

- Developer: The Fun Pimps
- Publishers: The Fun Pimps; Telltale Publishing (PS4, X1)
- Engine: Unity
- Platforms: PlayStation 4; Xbox One; Linux; macOS; Windows; PlayStation 5; Xbox Series X/S
- Release: PS4, Xbox One; NA: June 28, 2016; EU: July 1, 2016; AU: July 8, 2016; Linux, Mac, Windows, PS5, Xbox Series X/S; July 25, 2024 (Note: Released in early access on December 13, 2013 for macOS and Windows, and on November 22, 2014 for Linux)
- Genre: Survival horror
- Modes: Single-player, multiplayer

7 Days to Die is a survival horror video game set in an open world developed by the Fun Pimps. It was released through early access for OS X and Windows on December 13, 2013, and for Linux on November 22, 2014. Versions for the PlayStation 4 and Xbox One were released in 2016 through Telltale Publishing, but are no longer being developed. A 1.0 version was released for Windows, PlayStation 5, and Xbox Series X/S on July 25, 2024.

== Gameplay ==
The goal of 7 Days to Die is to survive for as long as possible while fending off the elements and zombies. The player can either spawn into a randomly generated world or the pre-set world of Navezgane, Arizona. As a survival game, the player character is in constant need of water and food for sustenance, as well as being vulnerable to injury and illness. The game is voxel-based (similar in some aspects to Minecraft, but with smooth terrain), allowing for simple building and destruction of objects in a physics-simulated environment (for example, building a structure with no support such as pillars and walls can lead to its collapse). Objects in the world degrade through use, so the player has to search for or make new tools as the game progresses. The player can also gather and create materials—from nature and the remnants of human civilization—to construct these necessary items.

While the game includes wildlife that can be hunted for food or that will hunt the player, the main hazard is zombies, which are affected by the game's day/night cycle—during the day they are relatively slow-moving and easy targets that can only detect the player at relatively close ranges, but at night they become feral, which makes them move much faster and thus greatly increases their threat. As the in-game days progress, tougher and more aggressive variants begin to appear. Stealth and distraction can be used to avoid unnecessary conflict. They are also drawn to areas of human (i.e. player) activity, and will relentlessly attack anything that impedes their movement until they are killed or the obstacle is destroyed, including player-built fortifications. Should they detect the player, zombies will apply the same single-minded pursuit until the player is either dead, or leaves the immediate area.

The game's title is a reference to an important Blood Moon event that occurs every seventh day of in-game time, whereby hordes of zombies and wild infected animals attack the player's current location en masse. Unless sufficient preparation has been made and defenses constructed, the player will quickly be overwhelmed.

The world of Navezgane is composed of multiple biomes, or geographic areas. These include dry deserts, temperate forests, snowy fields, as well as a burnt forest separating the southern and northern regions, and a brick and metal-strewn wasteland full of zombies. Each biome has unique resources that can be obtained, thus encouraging exploration across the map by players.

=== Multiplayer ===
Multiplayer is available through player-hosted servers and enables multiple players to interact and communicate with each other on a single world. Interactions can be cooperative or hostile depending on the used server options. Players can run their own servers or use a hosting provider. Single player worlds have local area network support, allowing players to join worlds on locally interconnected computers without a server setup. Players are also able to provide Wide Area Network support via single player worlds. 7 Days to Die servers can run on consoles, Windows and Linux. There are two supported game modes for multiplayer: Survival (both randomly generated and standard) and Creative. The console version of the game supported split screen cooperative multiplayer.

== Plot ==
The game's events take place after a nuclear attack in a Third World War, which destroyed an extremely large part of the world, except for some areas such as the fictional county of Navezgane, Arizona. Prior to the game’s events in December 2033, a virus known as the Septdiurnal Virus (SDV) had devastated the United States Of America, a year later in 2034 on January 15th, nuclear weapons were dropped onto major cities in a desperate bid to wipe out the zombies, leading to the Third World War. The player is a survivor of the apocalypse who must survive by finding shelter, food, and water and scavenging supplies to fend off the numerous zombies that populate Navezgane. A major (though currently unseen character) antagonist is Duke H. Cassadore, also known as the Duke of Navezgane, before the events of the game, the Duke had voiced his concern for Navezgane, saying it should be bordered, by the events of the game, the Duke has turned to banditry with a group of mutated soldiers (debated to be the bandits that were planned to be added for Q2 2025).

== Development ==
The Windows alpha version of the game was released on August 16, 2013, for people who pre-ordered the game on either Kickstarter or PayPal. As of August 11, 2013, development of the game is ongoing with a Kickstarter campaign ending on August 15. The estimated release date was May 2014 for Microsoft Windows; Macintosh and Linux versions were planned for later in the year.

The game was also greenlight on Steam after 23 days getting over 75,000 yes votes, 8,340 followers, and 8,700 favorites. It was number one on Steam Greenlight, after only 16 days with over 56,000 votes. The Mac version was released on September 13, 2013, at the same time as update Alpha 1.1.

The game left early access and was officially released on July 25th 2024, the version Alpha 22 becoming 1.0.

=== PC ===
7 Days To Die was released to the public on Alpha 1.0. Only users who had backed the game via the Kickstarter campaign or who bought it via PayPal had access to the Alpha until Alpha 5.0, which was released on Steam as an Early Access game on December 13, 2013.

Alpha 7.8 was released on April 4, 2014, followed by Alpha 7.9 on April 8, and Alpha 7.10 April 19. Alpha 8 was released on May 7, 2014, which updated the visuals for zombie animations and smoothed the terrain for a final time. Alpha 9 was released on August 19, 2014, and added random generated worlds, new injuries, new light effects, and new graphics. Alpha Version 10 was released on November 22, 2014, and added a new character creation system with face/body morphing and visible clothing, a new zombie horde world heat map system and a new wellness system.

Alpha Version 11 was released on April 2, 2015, where the developers updated to Unity 5, which includes many graphical improvements, a new quality range system for guns, weapons, tools and armor and a new Zombie called "Feral". Alpha 12 was released on July 3, 2015, and added a new vehicle system with a Mini Bike, first weather system, new sound and physics systems, among other fixes and additions. Alpha 13 was released on December 10, 2015, adding temperature survival elements, a skill system, and a redesigned crafting system. The difficulty of the game has increased, but it continues to be popular.

Alpha 14 was released on March 26, 2016, with further improvements and more features, a lot of bug fixes, as well as some performance and graphic optimizations. Alpha 15 was then released on October 5, 2016, with major improvements to random generated maps, a trader system, a new difficulty scaling and several more features. The UMA-Zombies that were introduced in this Alpha would be removed in Alpha 16.

On June 6, 2017, Alpha 16 was released. This release added electricity to the game for the first time and introduced various traps including electric fences and spinning blades. On November 19, 2018, Alpha 17 was formally released which added a quest system as well as new vehicles and numerous system overhauls. This build also featured new main menu music, marking the beginning of a large audio overhaul. The new music and sound design from Alpha 17 onwards would be produced by Native Darkness Productions. On October 2, 2019, Alpha 18 was released, which optimized and balanced the changes from Alpha 17, and also added new things to the game (Improved Random World Gen, new infection system, weapons and schematics, locations and POIs, zombie enrage mode etc.). This build also introduced what would be called the Dynamic Music System (abbreviated as DMS). On June 27, 2020, Alpha 19 was released, which added a new loot system, new weapons and tools, candy, a new critical hit system, new POIs and new texture overhauls for the zombies.

On December 1, 2021, Alpha 20 was released. The devs referred to this update as "by far the largest content drop" they had ever released for the game. Features included, but were not limited to: overhauling the random world generation feature, adding large numbers of new POIs, and giving items, objects, and enemies higher quality 3D models. The blunderbuss, which was the only firearm available to the player in prior versions, was replaced with a new lineup of makeshift pipe weapons. Though the update added a lot of new content, there was some criticism levied against the developers for the game remaining in the Alpha stage almost a decade after its launch.

February 1, 2022, saw the release of Alpha 20.1. With the previously mentioned release of Alpha 20 came new bugs, updates, and exploits. Alpha 20.1 saw many of these resolved. Most notably, there were fixes done to a number of POIs, a fix for several duplication glitches, and a fix for achievements. Additionally, there were a number of balance changes made based on player's feedback.

On June 29, 2023, Alpha 21 was released. November 20, 2023, saw the release of Alpha 21.2. There are many additions, bug fixes and changes in the patch notes for the latest version.

On July 25, 2024, Version 1.0 (formerly Alpha 22) was released, marking the game’s exit from Early Access and unifying the PC, PlayStation 5, and Xbox Series X/S editions under a single build. Features included a completely overhauled armor system with themed sets and first‐person hands reflecting worn gear; a new character customization system with multiple base models, facial sliders, and updated animations; diverse zombie variants using albedo texturing for varied appearances; redesigned animal models (cougars, pigs/“Grace” boar, wolves, rabbits, deer, bears); new vehicle assets (4×4, bicycle, minibike, motorcycle, gyrocopter) with mod‐dependent visuals; expanded POIs (Tier 5 football stadium, Tier 4 army camp, Tier 5 school, Tier 2 commercial strip, Tier 2 apartment, Haven Hotel, and additional wilderness locations); significant Random World Generation improvements (reduced memory usage, faster stamping/road carving, improved biome placement including burnt forests); refreshed props and world art (recycled‐material pallets, campsite tents, road decals, block‐on‐road placement); enhanced graphics and VFX (new fire barrel effects, richer blood/gore/dismemberment, contact shadows, ambient occlusion); performance optimizations (window tinting system, migration to Unity 2022 LTS with better Vulkan/DX12 support, lighting update manager, multi‐frame block entity spawning); and simultaneous console launch with feature parity.

On October 1, 2024, Version 1.1 (build 14) was released, adding numerous stealth‐mechanic refinements (e.g., adjusted stealth meter sensitivity, balanced perk/armor/light interactions), controller support for the RWG preview, new explosion particles for propane tanks/barrels/vehicles, updated inventory UI audio and block sound pickup/place, blood splatter on bear/dire wolf, prefab editor improvements, Twitch menu enhancements, AI investigation/range adjustments, weapon balance tweaks, new burnt zombie SFX and hazmat zombie gore, increased vehicle armor/fuel capacities, loot‐table adjustments, memory and RWG optimizations (e.g., garbage‐collectable RWG fields, improved texture streaming), updated loot/clothing icons, and other bug fixes and performance optimizations.

On December 10, 2024, Version 1.2 was released, introducing cross‐platform block lists, selectable graphics modes for consoles (Performance/Quality), crossplay support between PC and consoles (Windows, macOS, Linux, PS5, Xbox Series X/S), and various stability, balance, and QoL improvements (loot tuning, enemy scaling, preparatory framework for upcoming roadmap features).

On May 29, 2025, The Fun Pimps announced that Version 2.0 (“Storm’s Brewing”) would enter public experimental beta on June 16, 2025, with a full stable release scheduled for June 30, 2025. Planned features include biome progression with elemental hazards (smoke, heat, cold, radiation) and capped biome loot; new biome-specific zombies (e.g., desert plague spitter); a fully completed perk tree (ten perks per attribute, new “Mastery” perks, General Perks tab); the “Sledgehammer Saga” skill-book series; higher gamestage zombies (Charged Blue, Infernal Orange); optimized SpeedTree 8 foliage and new burnt/wasteland visuals; “crawl-out” zombies able to spawn and crawl through 1 m gaps; a Navezgane map overhaul with repositioned biome boundaries and trader POIs; approximately fifty new POIs (including additional wilderness locations and reworked demanding POIs); distinct footstep and biome-specific zombie sound effects; a new cosmetic wardrobe system (separate stats and appearance), Twitch Drops, and upcoming DLC outfits; random-gen improvements for wilderness POI placement and roads; a revamped quest marker system with custom flags; multiplayer tweaks (Spawn Near Friend, pre-join Main Menu button); and crossplay on dedicated servers for consoles (pending certification).

=== Console ===
In April 2016, the game was announced for PlayStation 4 and Xbox One. It was published by Telltale Publishing and released in June and July 2016.

The most recent update for the console versions, Patch 13, was released on December 13, 2017. This patch updates the PlayStation 4 version of the game to version 1.18, and the Xbox One version of the game to version 1.0.18.0.

In late 2022, the Fun Pimps announced that the game will be re-released on consoles targeting PlayStation 5 and Xbox Series X/S.

==== Telltale's Closure ====
On September 21, 2018, Telltale Games abruptly laid off most of its staff due to financial problems, and on October 11, 2018, began liquidating its assets through Sherwood Partners. A statement by The Fun Pimps on November 13, 2018, via their official online forum stated "upon hearing the news, The Fun Pimps immediately terminated its license agreement with Telltale, which only allowed publishing rights on the console ports of the 7 Days to Die game." They went on to say that this "also severed Telltale's rights to any future updates or sequels of the 7 Days to Die franchise."

The Fun Pimps released a statement on October 16, 2019, stating that the developer had re-acquired the publishing rights to the game. The future of the console ports, which has not been updated since 2017, is not entirely clear. For long period of time there was no active development happening. On November 2, 2022, during an interview on a YouTube channel "Guns, Nerds, and Steel", The Fun Pimps, announced that they hired external developers to port the game to Xbox Series X/S and PlayStation 5.

== Reception ==
Reception

Aggregate score
Aggregator	Score	
Aggregator	PS4	Xbox One
Metacritic	45/100	35/100

Review scores
Publication	Score	
Publication	PS4	Xbox One
Destructoid	N/A	3/10
GamesMaster	48%	N/A
GameSpot	N/A	2/10
IGN	N/A	4.9/10
PlayStation Official Magazine – UK	5/10	N/A
The Digital Fix	N/A	4/10
Metro	N/A	2/10

The PlayStation 4 and Xbox One versions of 7 Days to Die received "unfavorable" reviews according to the review aggregation website Metacritic.

7 Days to Die was one of the "Top 100 Selling games of 2017" on Steam.

One reviewer criticised the length of time that the game had spent in an alpha state.
