= Stranded (video game) =

2003 video game

- Logo
- Developer: Unreal Software
- Publisher: Unreal Software
- Designer: Peter Schauß
- Platform: Microsoft Windows
- Release: 2003
- Genres: Action-adventure, survival
- Mode: Single-player

Stranded is a 3D action-adventure video game developed by Unreal Software. The game belongs to the Robinsonade genre, placing players in the role of a castaway whose primary objective is to survive on a hazardous island while gathering resources, crafting tools, and ultimately finding a way to return home.

The game was released as freeware, making it available to download and play at no cost. Its sequel, Stranded II, was later released under the CC BY-NC-SA Creative Commons license, with its source code also made publicly available.

== History ==
Stranded was released in mid-2003 by Peter Schauß, founder of Unreal Software. Its design and gameplay were influenced by Schiffbruch, a relatively obscure German freeware survival game that similarly centers on surviving after becoming stranded on a remote island.

Stranded achieved critical attention following its release, and by November 2003 had been featured in four German gaming magazines as well as the Rhein-Zeitung newspaper. Development concluded with the release of Version 1.3, after which Peter Schauß made the game's source code publicly available. However, because no software license accompanied the source code, copyright remained with Schauß.

== Gameplay ==
Although Stranded lacks a traditional campaign mode, its primary "Random Island" mode is framed by a narrative in which the player is stranded on a deserted island. Gameplay centers on survival and resource management, requiring the player to satisfy basic needs such as hunger, thirst, and sleep while enduring a dynamic day-night cycle. Sleeping without adequate shelter results in injury, consuming uncooked food provides limited nourishment, and hostile wildlife poses a constant threat.

To survive, players must gather natural resources, including branches, stones and vines to craft tools, weapons and shelters. The construction system follows a progression in which completing basic structures unlocks increasingly advanced buildings and crafting options. The ultimate objective is to construct a raft and escape the island, allowing the player to return home.

The game's terrain is fully modifiable, allowing players to alter the environment through gameplay and custom map creation.

In addition to the standard survival experience, Stranded includes a variety of standalone scenarios, such as rescuing kiwi birds or defending against packs of hostile raptors within a time limit. Custom maps can be created using the built-in map editor, and numerous fan-made creations were made available through the official Stranded website. While map creators can customize certain gameplay parameters, such as disabling hunger, thirst, or sleep mechanics, storytelling capabilities are limited to an introductory briefing message and environmental design.

== Stranded II ==
Peter Schauß began development of Stranded II in late 2003. The game entered a public alpha testing phase in December 2005 before its final release in June 2007. Stranded II featured significantly improved graphics, expanded gameplay mechanics, and a greater variety of content. It was also designed with modding in mind, providing extensive tools and support for community-created modifications.

== Stranded III ==
As of 2026, Peter Schauß is developing Stranded III, the next installment in the series. The game is planned to feature multiplayer support through the Unreal Software Gaming Network, the online service used by Counter-Strike 2D and Carnage Contest. Although no mobile version is currently planned, Schauß has stated that a mobile release may be considered after the PC version is released.
