= Cataclysm: Dark Days Ahead =

Survival horror roguelike video game

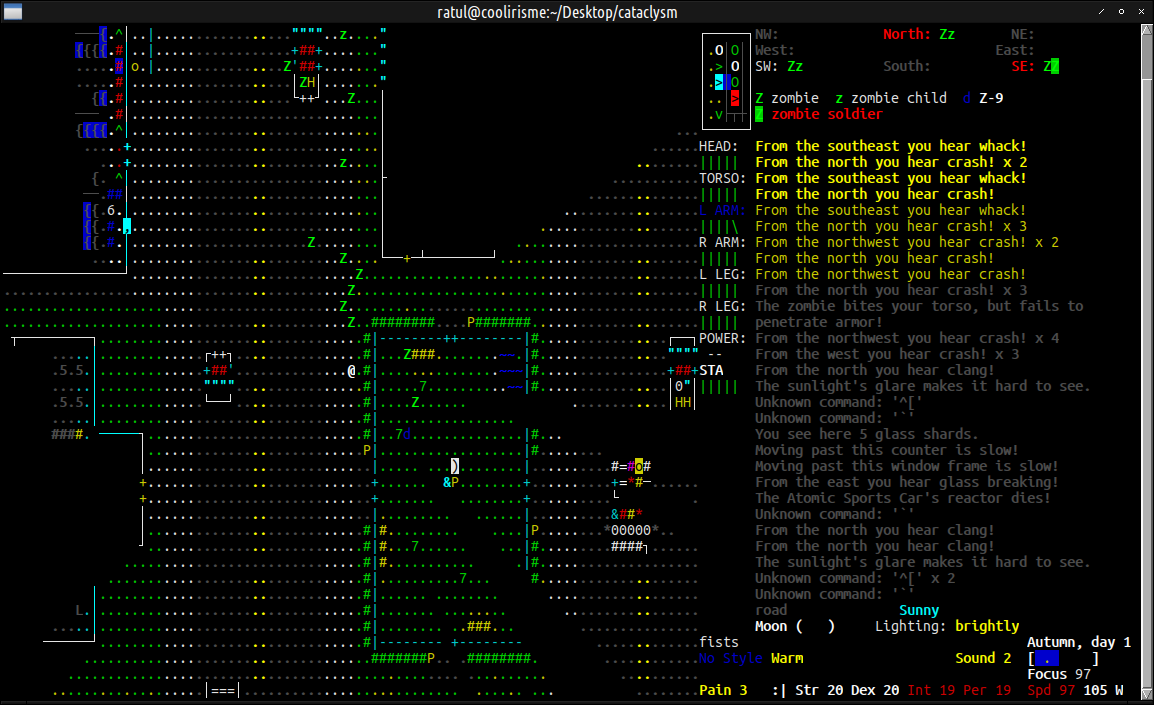
- Screenshot of a player ('@') being chased by zombies ('Z')
- Original author: Whales
- Developers: Kevin Granade and community
- Release: 0.1 / 26 February 2013; 13 years ago
- Stable release: 0.I "Ito" / 6 June 2026; 4 months ago
- Written in: C++, ASCII with ncurses, Tiles with SDL
- Platform: Linux, OS X, Microsoft Windows, iOS, Android
- Available in: 25 languages
- List of languages English, Chinese, Chinese (Taiwan), Russian, Spanish, Spanish (Latin American), Japanese, Polish, German, Hungarian, Portuguese, Portuguese (Brazil), Korean, French, Italian, Norwegian Bokmal, Dutch, Czech, Ukrainian, Greek, Arabic, Danish, Filipino, Icelandic, Indonesian, Serbian, Turkish
- Type: Single-player, roguelike, survival horror
- License: CC BY-SA 3.0
- Website: cataclysmdda.org
- Repository: github.com/CleverRaven/Cataclysm-DDA

Cataclysm: Dark Days Ahead (CDDA) is an open-source survival horror roguelike video game. Cataclysm: Dark Days Ahead is a fork of the original game Cataclysm. The game is freely downloadable on the game's website and the source code is also freely available on the project's GitHub repository under the CC BY-SA Creative Commons license. The game is currently largely developed by its community. Rock, Paper, Shotgun named CDDA one of "The 50 Best Free Games on PC" in 2016 and later one of "The Greatest PC Games of the 2010s."

The game can be played either in text-based mode or through graphical tilesets. Prior to playing, the player generates a world with different settings and mods. The player then creates a character and select one of many possible starting scenarios. At game start, the player has multiple approaches, including things required for day-to-day survival such as scavenging, hunting, and finding shelter, as well as larger goals such as farming, installing bionics, making and repairing vehicles, and constructing homes.

== Plot ==
The game is set in New England in 2027 (current year + 1), after a catastrophic event killed most of the human population and spawned various monsters and hazards. After an interdimensional traveler from an alternate Earth crash landed a portal traveling vessel in the Midwestern United States 35 years prior to Cataclysm, the US government began to research alternate dimensions. In their explorations they obtained a sample called XE-037 (known among the developers as the Blob) that was able to reanimate the dead and cause targeted phenotype mutations. It escaped the lab environment and reproduced in the world's groundwater supply, causing an enormous zombie outbreak and manipulating the population through people's moods, making many people violent (the player characters and the NPCs they meet, though still infected, are either immune to the Blob’s psychosis effects or have recovered from it). In the following months, the world began to further spiral out of control, with mass demonstrations, rioting, and internal deployment of troops. Amidst the chaos, Earth became the target of a multidimensional portal attack, leading to vast portal storms, with portals opening all over the world, affecting the weather and the reality around them. Unknown forces from other dimensions entered opportunistically as the dimensional fabric was destabilized.

A US government official managed to get access to the Emergency Broadcast System, and send out a final message: "The government has fallen. No help is coming, you’re on your own". This event is referred to as "The Cataclysm".

Though the cataclysm is predominantly a zombie apocalypse, many other apocalyptic events are occurring alongside it, including invasions from fungi, triffids, and Lovecraftian monsters such as Mi-Gos that have built encampments and towers around the world.

== Development ==
Cataclysm: Dark Days Ahead is based on the earlier game Cataclysm whose source code was made open-source under the Creative Commons CC BY-SA license on GitHub by the original author Whales in October 2010. After the Cataclysm author ended the development around 2012, the game's community forked the game into a new repository called Cataclysm: Dark Days Ahead in early 2013.

In June 2013, a successful crowdfunding campaign on Kickstarter raised $9,492 (beyond the $7,000 goal) for the payment of a full-time developer for 3.5 months.

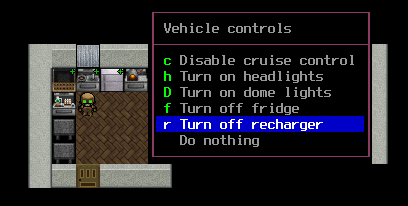
View with graphical tiles

The game is made with ncurses to provide text-based graphics; later a Simple DirectMedia Layer (SDL) version with graphical tiles became available.

The game is under heavy development with experimental releases available multiple times each day. The stable versions are considered "snapshots" of development rather than the primary version, with the daily updated experimental branch being the "master" version of the game. From 0.H, release candidate builds were introduced, backporting fixes and featuring minor adjustments only.

In December 2015, an unofficial launcher was created for CDDA under an open-source MIT license to allow players to stay up to date with the latest releases and third-party mods. However, the launcher has been unmaintained since January 2022. Other launchers have since been created and released, including a fork named Kitten CDDA Launcher and a Godot-based launcher called Catapult.

In 2020, the game was updated with deeper NPC features, water travel, crafting recipes, factions, and fast travel mechanics.

== Gameplay ==
Gameplay video

Unlike most roguelikes, the game features non-linear gameplay: the player is free to explore the procedurally generated map, clear areas of monsters, work with NPCs, and build shelters and vehicles. The gameplay is mainly based on day-to-day survival, and the game tracks parameters like hunger, thirst, morale, illness and temperature which the player must manage to stay alive. More advanced players usually set up their own stories and end goals for the player characters, such as searching for artifacts, clearing cities of zombies, and even working with the game’s factions, and even there, these goals currently do not “end” the game. The game also manages numerous other mechanics about the player including drug addiction, mutations, broken limbs, and bionic implants.

=== World ===
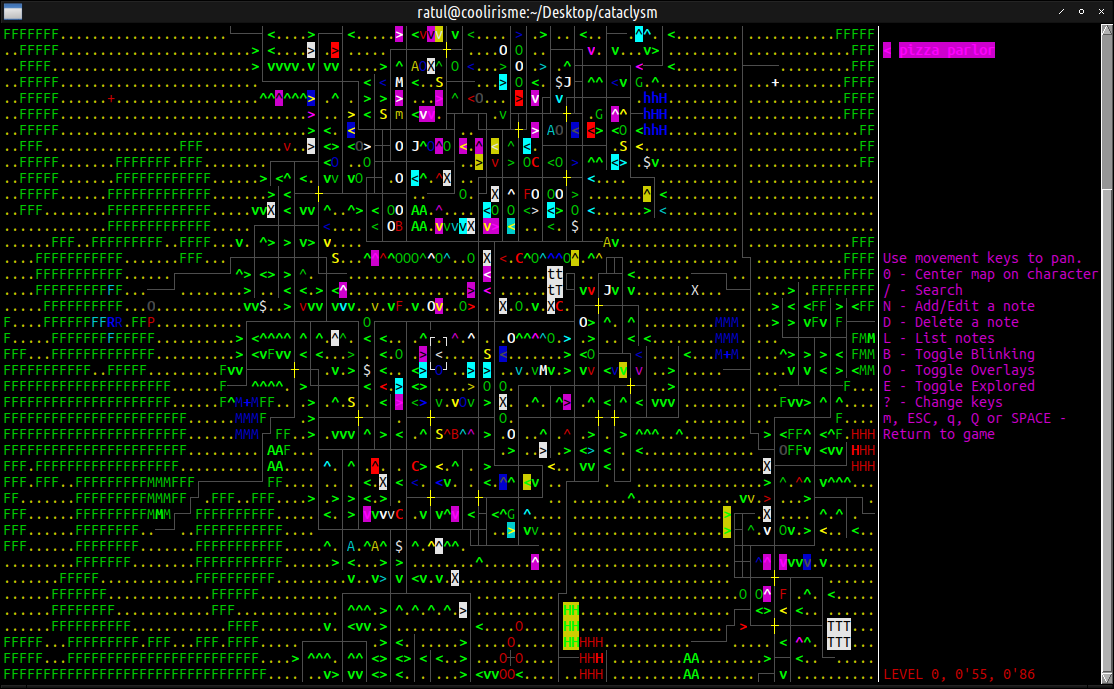
Map view showing a large city

The world can be persistent between games. When starting a new character after the death of a previous character, the new game can be set in the same game world as the last, but it is not recommended as it can cause issues The world has support for seasons and dynamic weather conditions, and the season lengths can be modified during world generation. Recent weather conditions/events added include the portal storms, which were initially only mentioned in the main storyline for CDDA, during these portal storms, nether monsters will appear and can cause negative effects on the player when they get caught outdoors during the storm if not outright kill them, but during the portal storms, a dungeon will appear, this dungeon can grant the player unique temporary status effects or items by travelling through it successfully.

A typical CDDA world has cities, towns, rivers, forests, bridges and other landmarks. Cities and towns generally have several common establishments often found in the real world such as houses, stores, malls, parking lots, swimming pools, hospitals, and more, but hold danger in the form of large hordes. Rarer locations such as labs, military bases, and missile silos can be found in remote places throughout the world. Latest versions have support for three-dimensional buildings.

While most of the action in CDDA is liable to happen on the surface overworld, as traditional with roguelikes, the world does contain underground dungeons. Examples of these include mines, labs, and strange temples.

=== Character ===
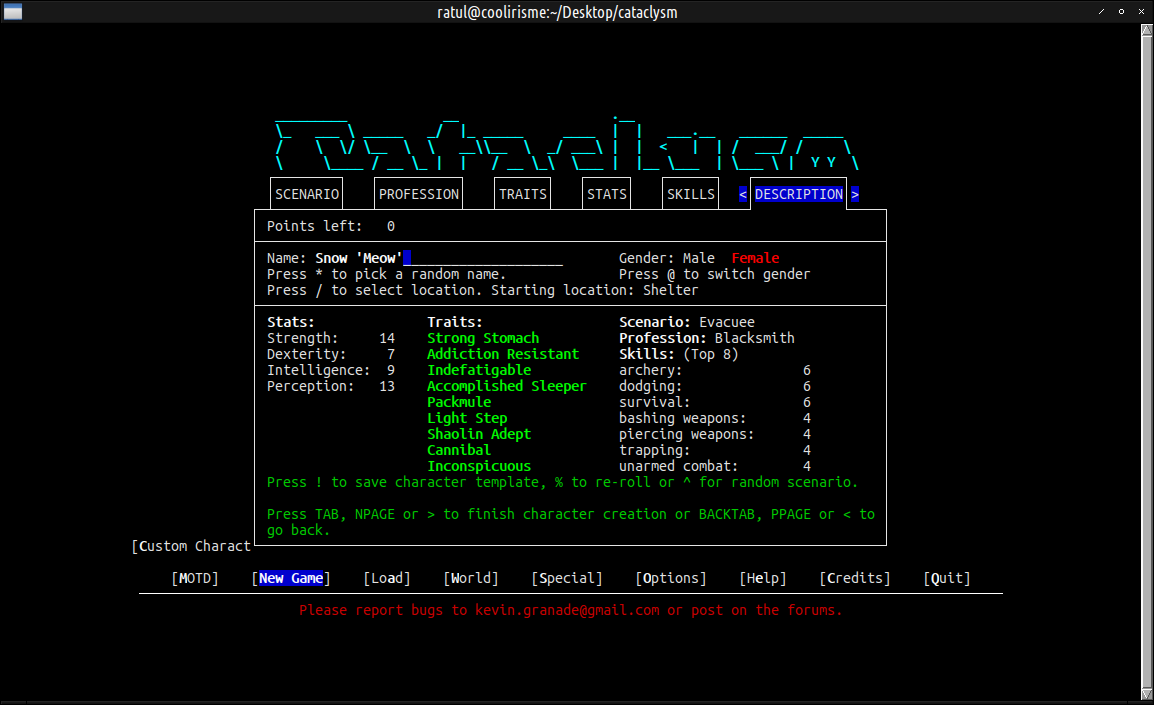
Player creation menu which shows Profession, Traits, Skills and Stats

Characters can be generated randomly or can be custom-built to suit player gameplay and preferences. Players choose from several available initial scenarios. The default scenario is "Evacuee" in which the player starts from an evacuation center with few provisions.

Like most roguelikes, the game allows players to initially choose from various professions and each profession has its own set of traits and skills. Characters can increase their skills gradually once in-game by practicing the respective skills or reading books obtained from various sources found within the cities or towns.

The game has a menu which shows the character's current conditions such as hunger, thirst, morale and illness. In order to survive, the character has to consume food and water often, and sleep on a regular basis. If afflicted with an illness, the player must use certain medications in order to treat the diseases, most diseases can recover their own, but some others can only be removed with the right medication, or vice versa. The menu also displays the character's stats.

=== Crafting ===
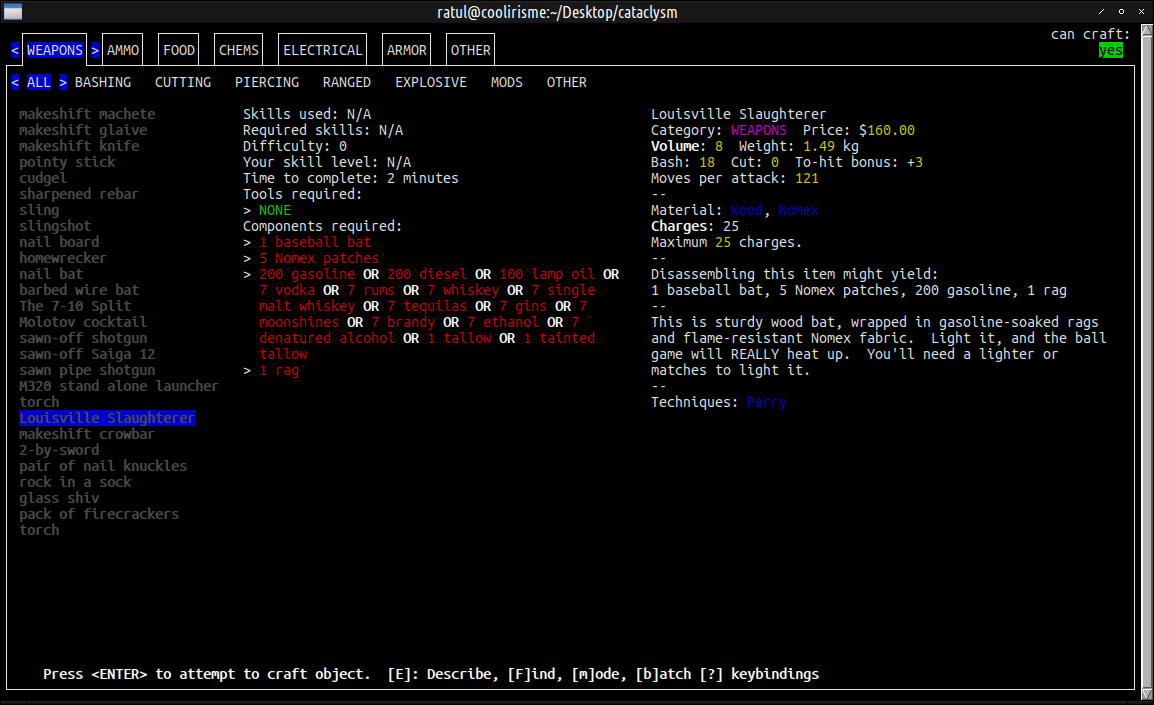
Crafting menu

Despite the game lean toward looting as primary source of tools and equipment, CDDA has a detailed crafting system, with many basic necessities such as clothing and food being craftable from raw items that are found lying around the world. For crafting to be successful the player needs the necessary raw materials, equipment, skill and proficiencies. The player also needs to know the recipe of the object to be crafted, which can be found by having specific books. Successful crafting leads to an increase of the corresponding skill.

Crafting can be hampered by player conditions such as low morale, damaged limbs, insufficient light or lack of flat surface or workbench.

=== Construction ===
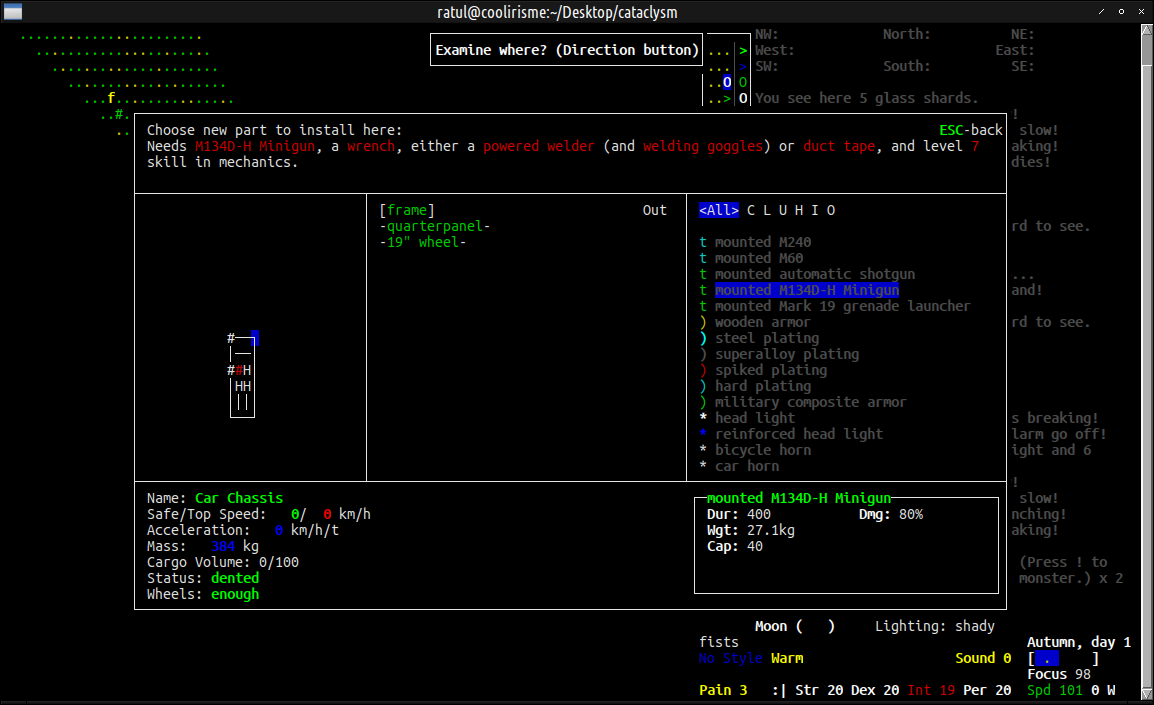
Vehicle construction and repair menu

CDDA features an intricate construction menu where one can perform activities ranging from simple construction, like boarding up a window or digging a pit, to elaborate ones like building a reinforced concrete wall, digging a well or creating basements. Like crafting, construction requires raw materials like brick, stones, or nails. Equipment required for construction can be either salvaged from cities or can be crafted via the crafting menu from additional raw materials. For the most part, the terrain in the game is fully destructible, meaning that the player and other entities can destroy it or build structures on it.

Vehicles can be repaired or even built from scratch using the construction menu. Players are reported to have created vehicles of quite different sizes and capabilities, from small quad bikes with limited storage to huge "deathmobiles" with multiple engines, turrets, machine guns, and chemical labs.

=== Farming ===
The player can farm land and grow grains, vegetables, berries and other shrubs (e.g. cotton), provided that they find the respective seeds. The final crop can be laid up for later use (though some food may perish), it can be eaten raw or can be used to prepare more elaborate products (e.g. cooking oil, flour, spirits, vinegar, sealed food).

The farming season usually extends from late spring to early autumn and depends on external temperature. Every plant type has different growing rates and growth can be accelerated using commercial or home-made fertilizers. Final output depends on the character's survival skill: the higher the skill, the higher the yield of every single plant. Once harvested, all plants are considered "dead" and leave straw (grains) or withered plants and some seeds.

=== Creatures ===
There are a plethora of monsters and creatures found in the world. The wilderness contains many animals, ranging from small passive animals such as squirrels, rabbits, and rats, to large aggressive predators and sometimes hostile herbivores ranging from moose to wolves and bears. These animals can be hunted for their meat, fur, bones, and organs for cooking and sometimes chemistry.

The main threat to the character's life are the zombies that roam mainly the cities and some areas within the wilderness. Zombies come in many shapes, abilities and sizes, and most (but not all of them) are infamous for their ability to revive after some time if they are not butchered or smashed to a pulp. In the early days since the Cataclysm, the player will encounter civilians who’s blob psychosis has rendered them unable to fight back against zombies, making them easy for zombies to kill, as well as feral humans, the remnants of the original rioters of the Cataclysm who are hostile to the player and are not attacked by zombies. Civilians may become feral or zombies, and most feral humans will eventually die out into extinction between one and two months, as they are unable to take care of themselves.

The game also features a wide range of adversaries ranging from mutant humans and animals to aliens and interdimensional creatures, often inspired by the works of H. P. Lovecraft, Junji Ito and other popular horror and science fiction genres.

As time passes, zombies and other creatures mutate into more powerful forms, progressively increasing difficulty. Mundane animals may be replaced with zombie or mutant versions, further reducing access to edible meat while making the world more hostile.

Despite the increasing deadliness of zombies and monsters, unlike most other games, the number of zombies and monsters in a given area (not counting the overall infinite world) is limited, when the zombies and monsters of an area are dead and rendered unable to revive, they will no longer spawn in that area.

== Reception ==
The game's reception by gaming websites was overwhelmingly positive. Rock, Paper, Shotgun named it number 39 of "The 50 Best Free Games on PC" in October 2016, and again in 2023. Cataclysm: Dark Days Ahead was also ranked the second best open source video games by The Gamer.

== See also ==
- List of open source games
- List of roguelikes
