= Survival game =

Video game genre

Survival games are a subgenre of action games which are often set in hostile, intense, open-world environments. Players generally start with minimal equipment and are required to survive as long as possible by finding the resources necessary to manage hunger, thirst, disease and mental state. Many survival games are based on randomly or procedurally generated persistent environments; more recently, survival games are often playable online, allowing players to interact in a single world. Survival games are generally open-ended with no set goals and often closely related to the survival horror genre, where the player must survive within a supernatural setting, such as a zombie apocalypse.

== Gameplay ==
Survival games are considered an extension of a common video game theme where the player character is stranded or separated from others and must work alone to survive and complete a goal. Survival games focus on the survival parts of these games, while encouraging exploration of an open world. Some gameplay elements present in the action-adventure genre—such as resource management and item crafting—are commonly found in survival games and serve as central elements featured in games like Survival Kids. At the start of a typical survival game, the player is placed alone in the game's world with few resources. It is not uncommon for players to spend the majority or entirety of the game without encountering a friendly non-player character; since NPCs are typically hostile to the player, the emphasis is placed on avoidance, rather than confrontation. In some games, however, combat is unavoidable and provides the player with valuable resources (e.g., food, weapons, and armor).

In some games, the world is generated randomly so that the player must actively search for food and weapons, often provided with visual and auditory cues of the types of resources that may be found nearby. The player character typically has a health bar and will take damage from falling, starving, drowning, contact with fire or harmful substances, and attacks by monsters that inhabit the world. Other metrics related to the player-character's vulnerability to the game world may also come into play. For example, the survival game, Don't Starve, features a separate hunger gauge and a sanity meter, which will cause the death of the character if allowed to deplete. Character death may not be the end of the game, however – the player may be able to respawn and return to the game location at which their character died in order to retrieve lost equipment. Other survival games use permadeath: the character has one life, and dying requires that the game be restarted. While many survival games are aimed at constantly putting the player at risk from hostile creatures or the environment, others may downplay the amount of danger the player faces and instead encourage more open-world gameplay, where player character death can still occur if the player is not careful or properly equipped.

=== Player experience ===
Survival games are almost always playable as a single-player game, but many games have been designed to be played in multiplayer, with game servers hosting the persistent world that players can connect to. The open-ended nature of these games encourages players to work together to survive against the elements and other threats that the game may pose. When there are no opposing players within the same world, this dynamic is often referred to as player versus environment or PvE, whereas when opposing players are present within the same world, it is known as player versus player or PvP. This generally leads to players forming alliances, constructing fortified structures and working together to protect themselves from both the dangers presented by the game's world and the other players' characters.

=== Crafting ===
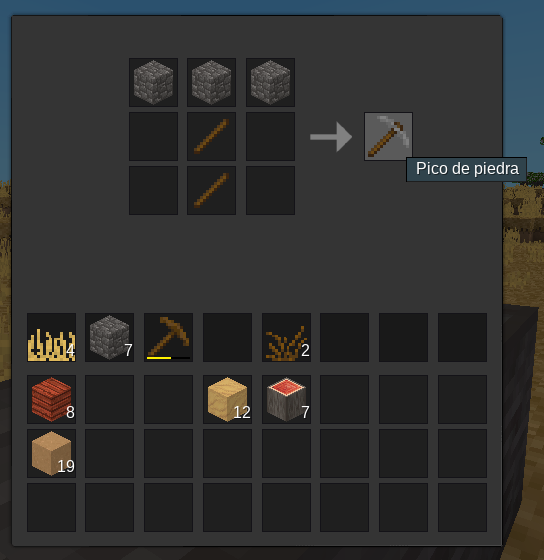
Making a pickaxe through the crafting interface in Luanti (formerly Minetest)

Many survival games feature crafting; by combining two or more resources, the player can make a new object, which can be used for further crafting. Other games can use just one resource to make another, like Subnautica. This enables gameplay where the player collects resources to craft new tools, which in turn allow them to obtain better resources, which can then, again, be used to obtain better tools and weapons.

A common example is the creation of pick-axes of various levels of hardness: wooden pick-axes may allow stone to be mined but not metallic ores; however, a pick-axe made from collected stone can be used to mine these metallic ores. The same concept applies to weapons and armor, with better offensive and defense bonuses provided by items made from materials which are more difficult to acquire. The crafting system often includes durability factors for tools and weapons, causing the tool to break after a certain amount of usage. Crafting systems may not give the player the necessary recipes for crafting, requiring for them to be learned through experimentation or from game guides.

=== Objectives ===
There is rarely a winning condition for survival games: the challenge is to last as long as possible, though some games set a goal for survival time. As such, there is rarely any significant story in these games beyond establishing the reason why the player character has found themselves in the survival situation. Some survival games provide quests, which help the player learn the game's mechanics and lead them to more dangerous areas, where better resources can be found. Because of the open-world nature and crafting systems, some games allow for user-made structures to be built. Minecraft, for example, allows players to place blocks to construct crude shelters for protection, but as they gather more resources and readily survive, players can create massive structures from the game's building blocks, often modeling real-world and fictional buildings. Survival games typically feature non-replenishing resources, though the player can take steps to allow new resources to generate. For example, in Terraria, chopping down a tree will eliminate that tree, but the player can replant seeds, allowing new trees to grow.

== Presentation and mechanics ==
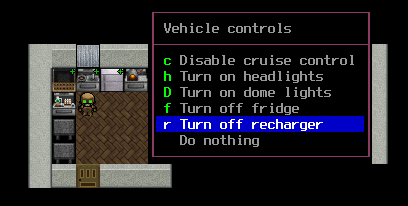
The top-down grid view of Cataclysm: Dark Days Ahead

Many survival games are presented in the first-person perspective to help immerse the player in the game. Other titles use other methods of presentation: games like Terraria and Starbound are presented in two-dimensional side views, while Don't Starve uses sprites rendered in a three-dimensional isometric projection. Furthermore, while survival games are considered action games, there are other genres that feature the survival theme, such as the turn-based role-playing games Dead State and NEO Scavenger, and the story-driven first-person shooter series S.T.A.L.K.E.R.. Survival mechanics, particularly resource gathering, hunting, and crafting, have also been incorporated into games in other genres, such as 2013's Tomb Raider and the Far Cry series.

== History ==
In a general sense, survival elements have been around since the beginning of the video game industry. The basic concept of survival can be found in sports video games (as early as Pong in 1972), fighting games and adventure games, while survival scenarios can be found in classic arcade action games (such as Space Invaders in 1978 and Pac-Man in 1980) and survival horror games (such as Resident Evil in 1996). A more specific modern survival game genre began to emerge in the 1990s, but was not clearly defined until the early 21st century.

An early example of the survival game genre is UnReal World, which was created by Sami Maaranen in 1992 and is still in active development. The rogue-like game used ASCII graphics and placed the player in the harsh conditions of Finland during the Iron Age. Unlike traditional Roguelike games, where there was a goal to reach, UnReal World's only goal was to survive as long as possible against wild creatures and the dangers that the snowy weather created. Another early example of the survival game genre is the Super Nintendo Entertainment System game SOS, released by Human Entertainment in 1993.

Stranded (2003) was a simple 3D survival game with a concept very similar to modern survival games. Wurm Online contains elements that have ultimately influenced a number of survival games. Being a massively multiplayer online role-playing game (MMORPG), the game sets players as characters in a medieval setting, allows them to terraform the land, create buildings, and effectively develop their own kingdoms. Rolf Jansson and Markus Persson began the initial development of the game in 2003, and although Persson left around 2007, the game is still in active development. Persson became instrumental in developing Minecraft, which many consider to have popularised the survival game genre. From its initial public release in 2009, Minecraft focuses on resource-gathering and crafting in a procedurally-generated world, and requires the player to defend themselves during night cycles while gathering resources at other times.

Another key title in the survival genre was DayZ. It was originally released as a mod for ARMA 2 in 2012, but was later released as a standalone game, making over $5 million in one day once it became available. The game sets the players in the aftermath of a zombie apocalypse, where they must avoid hordes of zombies while scavenging through the remains of human civilization for resources. As a result of the financial success of Minecraft and DayZ, numerous titles of the survival genre were released from 2012 onward. Some believe that the market has become saturated with titles based on the same post-apocalyptic setting, clones of more popular titles, and titles released as a quick attempt to make money using early access models. The research firm SuperData estimated that survival games brought in over $400 million in revenue over the first six months of 2017, making the genre one of the largest markets in the video game industry.

== See also ==
- Battle royale game
- List of survival games
  - Minecraft
- Survival horror
