= Piggy (Lord of the Flies) =

Fictional character of Lord of the Flies

- Lord of the Flies character
- Piggy, portrayed by Hugh Edwards
- Created by: William Golding
- Portrayed by: Hugh Edwards (1963 film); Danuel Pipoly (1990 film); David McKenna (television series)

In-universe information
- Gender: Male
- Occupation: Student
- Nationality: British (novel; 1963 film; TV Series); American (1990 film)

Piggy is a fictional character in William Golding's novel Lord of the Flies. He is a student and the most logically intelligent boy of the group. He was played by Hugh Edwards in the 1963 film adaptation, Danuel Pipoly in the 1990 film, and David McKenna in the TV series adaptation.

== Allegorical interpretation ==
Piggy represents of intellect and science, along with his glasses, which also represents technological innovation. In short, he represents the rational side of humanity.

However, Piggy's intellect is frequently dismissed and mocked by the other boys. Ultimately, he fails to impose civilisation and order on the island.

== Character overview ==
In the novel, Piggy appears right after Ralph. He reveals to him that he is nicknamed Piggy, but asks Ralph to not tell the others. Shortly after, they both find a conch shell, that Ralph uses to call the other boys.

When all the boys reunite, it doesn't take long until Jack starts mocking Piggy. In this moment, Ralph reveals Piggy's nickname in front of everyone, to Piggy's dismay. Despite that, in the election to choose who will be chief, he does vote on Ralph.

During the course of the story, Piggy often gives advice to Ralph, and is his constant reminder of their goal of being rescued. Once the boys mention a beast, Piggy does not believe it, because it is something scientifically and logically impossible.

At Jack's feast, Piggy and Ralph, alongside Jack and his tribe, join their hunt-dance, and mistake Simon as the beast, killing him. The next day, Ralph is genuinelly remorseful, and Piggy tries to console him, affirming that Simon's death was just an accident.

One night, Jack and his hunters steal Piggy's glasses. To try to reason with him and his tribe, Piggy, Ralph and the twins go meet them at Castle Rock. Piggy makes a last effort in trying to reason with the boys. However, Roger, in a sense of delirius power, pushes a boulder off a cliff, which sends Piggy into the ocean, killing him.

== Portrayals ==
=== 1963 film ===
In the 1963 film, Piggy is portrayed by Hugh Edwards. His role doesn't differ much from the book.

=== 1990 film ===
In the 1990 film adaptation, he is portrayed by Danuel Pipoly. In this film, he is American, unlike the novel and other adaptations. Pipoly was nominated for the Young Artist Award, for Outstanding Young Ensemble Cast in a Motion Picture, and for Best Young Actor Supporting Role in a Motion Picture.

=== 2026 TV series ===
In the 2026 television series, Piggy is portrayed by David McKenna. His real name in this version is revealed to be Nicholas.

=== Graphic novel ===
An award-winning graphic novel adaptation of Lord of the Flies by Aimée de Jongh was released in 2024. Piggy resembles the one from the novel.

=== Theatrical release ===
The first adaptation of the story to stage was in 1984, adapted by the teacher Elliot Watkins. Golding gave his personal consent.

=== Radio ===
A radio adaptation, by Judith Adams, was also released, in 2013. Caspar Hilton-Hilley portrayed Piggy.

== Characterisation ==
=== Physical appearance ===
In the novel, Piggy is described as overweight, and wears glasses since he was three years old, due to his myopia. He is also revealed to suffer from asthma.

=== Personality ===
Piggy is the most logically intelligent boy in the island. He is also quite talkative. He gives lots of innovative ideas, and often helps Ralph in his leadership role.

Due to his physical appearance, poor eyesight and asthma, the others frequently ignore or disdain Piggy, including Ralph in the beginning. But, eventually, Piggy becomes one of the few allies Ralph has left, and is even described in the end of the novel as a "true, wise friend".
