= 12th Youth in Film Awards =

1991 US media awards ceremony

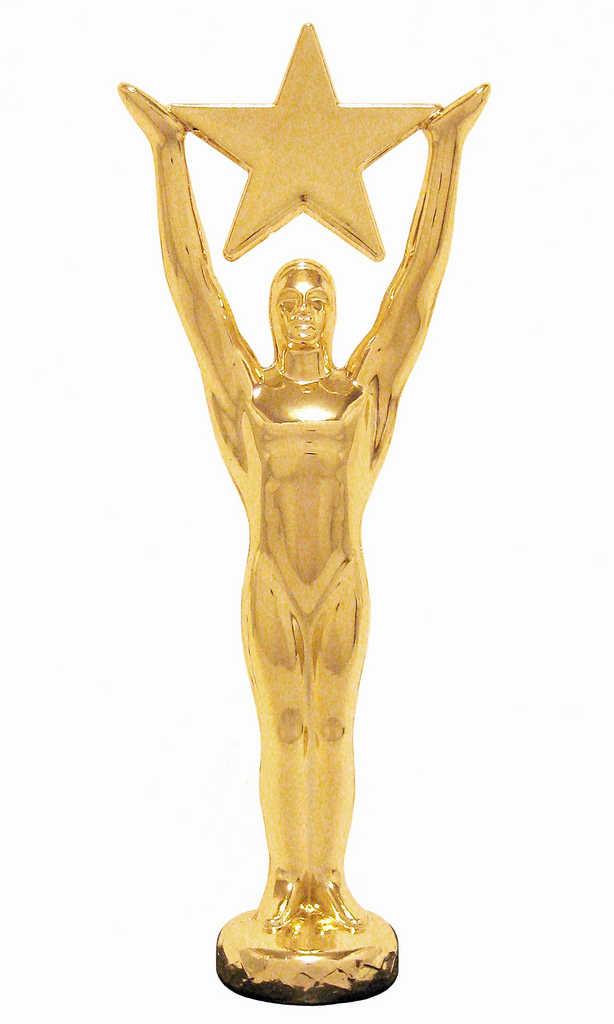
- Awarded for: Achievement in the 1989—1990 season
- Date: Late 1990/Early 1991 (exact date unknown)
- Site: Hollywood, California
- Hosted by: Elijah Wood

The 12th Youth in Film Awards ceremony (now known as the Young Artist Awards), presented by the Youth in Film Association, honored outstanding youth performers under the age of 21 in the fields of film, television and music for the 1989-1990 season. The exact date of the 12th annual ceremony is unknown, however, using the dates of the 11th and 13th annual awards, the 12th annual ceremony is believed to have taken place in late 1990 or early 1991 in Hollywood, California.

Established in 1978 by long-standing Hollywood Foreign Press Association member, Maureen Dragone, the Youth in Film Association was the first organization to establish an awards ceremony specifically set to recognize and award the contributions of performers under the age of 21 in the fields of film, television, theater and music.

== Categories ==
★ Bold indicates the winner in each category.

== Best Young Performer in a Motion Picture ==
=== Best Young Actor Starring in a Motion Picture ===
★ Macaulay Culkin - Home Alone (20th Century Fox)

- Balthazar Getty - Lord of the Flies (Columbia)
- Charlie Korsmo - Dick Tracy (Touchstone)
- Joshua Miller - Class of 1999 (Lightning Pictures)
- Elijah Wood - Avalon (TriStar)

=== Best Young Actress Starring in a Motion Picture ===
★ Robin Weisman - Three Men and a Little Lady (Touchstone)

- Kimberly Cullum - The Rapture (New Line Cinema)
- Brooke Fontaine - Ghost Dad (Universal)
- Staci Keanan - Lisa (United Artists)
- Lexi Faith Randall - The Long Walk Home (Miramax)

=== Best Young Actor Supporting Role in a Motion Picture ===
★ Christian and Joseph Cousins - Kindergarten Cop (Universal)

- Grant Gelt - Avalon (TriStar)
- Balthazar Getty - Young Guns II (20th Century Fox)
- Omar Gooding - Ghost Dad (Universal)
- Salim Grant - Ghost Dad (Universal)
- Zakee L. Howze - Mo' Better Blues (Universal)
- Danuel Pipoly - Lord of the Flies (Columbia)
- Brady Tsurutani - Come See the Paradise (20th Century Fox)

=== Best Young Actress Supporting Role in a Motion Picture ===
★ Christina Ricci - Mermaids (Orion Pictures)

- Tanya Fenmore - Lisa (United Artists)
- Angela Goethals - Home Alone (20th Century Fox)
- Mindy Isenstein - Avalon (TriStar)
- Marlene Katz - Arachnophobia (Amblin)
- Ariana Richards - Tremors (Universal)

== Best Young Performer in a TV Movie, Pilot or Special ==
=== Best Young Actor Starring in a TV Movie, Pilot, or Special ===
★ Stephen Dorff - Always Remember I Love You (CBS)

- Brandon Crane - It (ABC)
- Jacob Parker - A Killing in a Small Town (CBS)
- Bradley Pierce - Casey's Gift: For the Love of A Child (NBC)
- Kimber Shoop - Extreme Close-Up
- Brady Tsurutani - Hiroshima: Out of the Ashes
- Elijah Wood - Child in the Night (CBS)
- Morgan Weisser - Extreme Close-Up (NBC)

=== Best Young Actress Starring in a TV Movie, Pilot, or Special ===
★ Juliet Sorcey - A Mom for Christmas (NBC)

- Courtney Barilla - The Dreamer of Oz: The L. Frank Baum Story (NBC)
- Olivia Burnette - Casey's Gift: For the Love of a Child (NBC)
- Rachael Crawford - On Thin Ice: The Tai Babilonia Story (NBC)
- Erika Flores - Danielle Steel's Kaleidoscope (NBC)
- Nichole Francois - Follow Your Heart (NBC)
- Marta Woodward - In the Best Interest of the Child (CBS)

=== Best Young Actor in a Cable Special ===
★ Michael Faustino - Judgment (HBO)

- Justin Gocke - The Witching of Ben Wagner (Disney Channel)
- Mike Simmrin - Tales from the Crypt (HBO)
- Martin Smits - The Challengers (CBC)
- Leo Wheatley - The Little Kidnappers (Disney Channel)
- Noam Zylberman - Last Train Home (CBC)

=== Best Young Actress in a Cable Special ===
★ Sara Gilbert - Sudie and Simpson (Lifetime)

- Mairon Bennett] - Lantern Hill (PBS/Disney Channel)
- Ellen Blain - Rachel and Marla
- Maria King - Rachel and Marla
- Marcie Leeds - Wheels of Terror (USA Network)
- Bettina Rae - The Witching of Ben Wagner (Disney Channel)

== Best Young Performer in a Television Series ==
=== Best Young Actor Starring in a Television Series ===
★ Neil Patrick Harris - Doogie Howser, M.D. (ABC)

- Chris Burke - Life Goes On (ABC)
- Darius McCrary - Family Matters (CBS)
- Matthew Newmark - Guns of Paradise (CBS)
- Luke Rossi - Thirtysomething (ABC)

=== Best Young Actress Starring in a Television Series ===
★ Kellie Martin - Life Goes On (ABC)

- Jenny Beck - Guns of Paradise (CBS)
- Candace Cameron - Full House (ABC)
- Nicole Dubuc - Major Dad (CBS)
- Chelsea Hertford - Major Dad (CBS)
- Marisa Ryan - Major Dad (CBS)
- Kellie Shanygne Williams - Family Matters (CBS)

=== Outstanding Young Comedian in a Television Series ===
★ Jaleel White - Family Matters (CBS)

- Dustin Diamond - Saved by the Bell (NBC)
- David Faustino - Married... with Children (FOX)
- Jason Marsden - The Munsters Today (Syndication)

=== Outstanding Young Comedienne in a Television Series ===
★ Sara Gilbert - Roseanne (ABC)

- Jodie Sweetin - Full House (ABC)

=== Best Young Actor Starring in a New Television Series ===
★ Adam Jeffries - True Colors (FOX)

- Marty Belafsky - Hull High (NBC)
- Leonardo DiCaprio - Parenthood (NBC)
- Stephen Dorff - What a Dummy (Syndicated)
- Jay Ferguson - Evening Shade (CBS)
- Joshua Rudoy - What a Dummy (Syndicated)
- Scott Weinger - The Family Man (CBS)

=== Best Young Actress Starring in a New Television Series ===
★ Tatyana M. Ali - The Fresh Prince of Bel-Air (NBC)

- Maia Brewton - Parker Lewis Can't Lose (FOX)
- Alexis Caldwell - Lenny (CBS)
- Dah-ve Chodan - Uncle Buck (CBS)
- Shannen Doherty - Beverly Hills, 90210 (FOX)
- Chay Lentin - American Dreamer (NBC)
- Jenna von Oÿ - Lenny (CBS)

=== Best Young Actor Supporting or Recurring Role For a TV Series ===
★ Douglas Emerson - Beverly Hills, 90210 (FOX)

- Billy Cohen - Dear John (NBC)
- Chance Michael Corbitt] - Major Dad (CBS)
- Grant Gelt - WIOU (CBS)
- Brian Austin Green - Beverly Hills, 90210 (FOX)
- Brian Lando - Paradise (CBS)
- Max Elliott Slade - Parenthood (NBC)
- Troy Slaten - Parker Lewis Can't Lose (FOX)

=== Best Young Actress Supporting or Recurring Role For a TV Series ===
★ Andrea Barber - Full House (ABC)

- Tanya Fenmore - Life Goes On (ABC)
- Jaimee Foxworth - Family Matters (CBS)
- Jennie Garth - Beverly Hills, 90210 (FOX)
- Leigh Ann Orsi - Life Goes On (ABC)
- Tori Spelling - Beverly Hills, 90210 (FOX)
- Thora - Parenthood (NBC)

=== Best Young Actor Guest-Starring in a Television Series ===
★ Christopher Pettiet - Doogie Howser, M.D. (ABC)

- Jonathan Brandis - The Flash (CBS)
- Justin Burnette - What a Dummy (ep. "Good Neighbor Brannigan") (Syndication)
- Gregor Hesse - The New Lassie (ep. "A Boy and His Dog") (Syndication)
- Joshua Smith - Dear John (ep. "The Blunder Years") (NBC)

=== Best Young Actress Guest-Starring in a Television Series ===
★ Tori Spelling - Saved by the Bell (NBC)

- Lindsey Alley - B.L. Stryker (ep. "Night Train") (ABC)
- Olivia Burnette - Jake and the Fatman (ep. "My Buddy") (CBS)
- Amy Torchia - Midnight Caller (ep. "Do You Believe in Miracles") (NBC)
- Haylie Tyrie - Empty Nest (ep. "Take My Mom, Please") (NBC)
- Vicki Wauchope - Lifestories (NBC)

=== Best Young Actor Starring in an Off-Primetime Series ===
★ Mark-Paul Gosselaar - Saved by the Bell (NBC)

- Andrew Bednarski - Rin Tin Tin: K-9 Cop (CTV)
- Richard Cox - The Adventures of the Black Stallion (Family Channel)
- Mario Lopez - Saved by the Bell (NBC)
- Jason Marsden - The Munsters Today (Syndication)
- Will Nipper - The New Lassie (Syndication)
- Alexander Polinsky - Charles in Charge (Syndication)
- Josiah Trager - Big Brother Jake (Family Channel)

=== Best Young Actress Starring in an Off-Primetime Series ===
★ Christina Nigra - Out of This World (Syndication)

- Wendy Cox - The New Lassie (Syndication)
- Josie Davis - Charles in Charge (Syndication)
- Hilary Van Dyke - The Munsters Today (Syndication)
- Sarah Polley - Road to Avonlea (CBC/Disney Channel)
- Lark Voorhies - Saved by the Bell (NBC)

=== Best Young Actor Co-Starring in an Off-Primetime Series ===
★ Zachary Bennett - Road to Avonlea (CBC/Disney Channel)

- Joel Blake - Road to Avonlea (CBC/Disney Channel)
- Daniel Hilfer - Big Brother Jake (Family Channel)
- Avi Phillips - Maniac Mansion (Family Channel)
- Jeremy Wieand - Big Brother Jake (Family Channel)

=== Best Young Actress Co-Starring in an Off-Primetime Series ===
★ Jodi Peterson - The New Lassie (Syndication)

- Gabrielle Carmouche - Big Brother Jake (Family Channel)
- Harmony Cramp - Road to Avonlea (CBC/Disney Channel)
- Kathleen Robertson - Maniac Mansion (Family Channel)
- Gema Zamprogna - Road to Avonlea (CBC/Disney Channel)

=== Best Young Actor in a Daytime Series ===
★ R. J. Williams - General Hospital (ABC)

- Leonardo DiCaprio - Santa Barbara (NBC)
- Justin Gocke - Santa Barbara (NBC)
- Scott Groff - Days of Our Lives (NBC)
- Andy Kapovit - As the World Turns (CBS)
- Justin Whalin - Santa Barbara (NBC)

=== Best Young Actress in a Daytime Series ===
★ Aimee Brooks - Days of Our Lives (NBC)

- Brighton Hertford - General Hospital (ABC)
- Kassandra Kelly - Generations (NBC)
- Ashley Peldon - Guiding Light (CBS)

== Best Young Performer Under Nine Years of Age ==
=== Exceptional Performance By a Young Actor Under Nine ===
★ Jonathan Halyalkar - Who's the Boss? (ABC)

- M.P. Carter - Guns of Paradise (CBS)
- Michael Fishman - Roseanne (ABC)
- Jacob Gelman - Uncle Buck (CBS)
- Tony T. Johnson - Amen (NBC)
- Charles Miller - The Little Kidnappers (Disney Channel)
- Jacob Parker - Evening Shade (CBS)

=== Exceptional Performance By a Young Actress Under Nine ===
★ Raven-Symoné - The Cosby Show (NBC)

- Ashleigh Blair Sterling - The Family Man (CBS)
- Ashley Johnson - Growing Pains (ABC)
- Melissa Martin - Evening Shade (CBS)
- Sarah Martineck - Uncle Buck (NBC)
- Janna Michaels - What a Dummy (Syndication)

== Best Young Ensemble Performance ==
=== Outstanding Young Ensemble Cast in a Motion Picture ===
★ Kindergarten Cop (Universal Pictures) - Christian and Joseph Cousins, Justin Page, Peter Rakow, Sarah Rose Karr, Miko Hughes, Marissa Rosen, Ben Diskin, Tameka Runnels, Emily Ann Lloyd, Tina Hart and class

- Lord of the Flies (Columbia Pictures) - Balthazar Getty, Chris Furrh, Danuel Pipoly, Badge Dale, Andrew and Edward Taft, Gary Rule, Brian Jacobs, Brian Matthews, Robert Shea, David Weinstein, Terry Wells and cadets
- Mo' Better Blues (Universal Pictures) - Zakee L. Howze, Arnold Cromer, Raymond Thomas, Sheldon Turnipseed, Christopher Skeffrey and Terrence Williams

== Favorite New Recording Artist/Artists ==
=== Favorite New Recording Artist ===
★ Tevin Campbell - "Round and Round"

- Ana - "Got To Tell Me Something"
- Bobby Ross Avila - "I'm Your Puppet"
- Monie Love - "Monie in the Middle"
- Tommy Puett - "Kiss You All Over"

=== Favorite New Music Group ===
★ Nelson - "After the Rain"

- Guys Next Door - "I've Been Waiting For You"
- Linear - "Sending All My Love"
- Perfect Gentlemen - "Ooh La La (I Can't Get Over You)"
- The Party - "I Found Love"

== Best Family Television Entertainment ==
=== Best Family Special ===
★ Dolly Parton's Christmas at Home (ABC)

- Casey's Gift: For the Love of a Child (NBC)
- Hiroshima: Out of the Ashes (NBC)
- ABC Afterschool Special - The Perfect Date (ABC)
- The Dreamer of Oz: The L. Frank Baum Story (NBC)

=== Best New Family Comedy Series ===
★ The Fresh Prince of Bel-Air (NBC)

- Beverly Hills, 90210 (FOX)
- Lenny (CBS)
- Parker Lewis Can't Lose (FOX)
- The Flash (CBS)
- Uncle Buck (CBS)

=== Best Off-Prime Time Family Series ===
★ Saved by the Bell (NBC)

- Out of This World (KTLA)
- The Adventures of Superboy (KTLA)
- The Adventures of the Black Stallion (Family Channel)
- The Munsters Today (KTLA)
- The New Lassie (KCOP)

=== Best Youth Variety or Game Show ===
★ The Mickey Mouse Club: Mouseketeers (Disney Channel)

- Fun House: J.D. Roth (FOX)
- Guys Next Door: Patrick J. Dancy, Eddie Garcia, Bobby Leslie, Damon Sharpe and Chris Wolf (NBC)
- Hey Dude: David Lascher and Joe Torres (Nickelodeon)
- Wake, Rattle, and Roll: R. J. Williams (FOX)
- Youthquake: Jennifer Spears (USA Network)

=== Best New Cartoon Series ===
★ Tiny Toon Adventures (Warner Bros.)

- TaleSpin (Buena Vista)
- Gravedale High (NBC)
- Teenage Mutant Ninja Turtles (Group W)

== Best Family Motion Picture Entertainment ==
=== Motion Entertaining Family Youth Motion Picture: Animation ===
★ The Rescuers Down Under (Disney)

- DuckTales the Movie: Treasure of the Lost Lamp (Disney)
- Jetsons: The Movie (Universal)
- The Nutcracker Prince (Warner Bros.)

=== Most Entertaining Family Youth Motion Picture: Comedy/Action ===
★ Home Alone (20th Century Fox)

- Back to the Future Part III (Universal)
- Kindergarten Cop (Universal)
- Three Men and a Little Lady (Buena Vista)

=== Most Entertaining Family Youth Motion Picture: Comedy/Horror ===
★ Ghost (Paramount)

- Arachnophobia (Buena Vista)
- Dick Tracy (Touchstone)

=== Most Entertaining Family Youth Motion Picture: Drama ===
★ Dances with Wolves (TIG Productions/Orion Pictures)

- Avalon (Tri-Star)
- Teenage Mutant Ninja Turtles (New Line Cinema)

== Youth In Film's Special Awards ==
=== Former Child Star - Life Achievement Award ===
★ Mickey Rooney

=== Contribution to Youth Through the Performing Arts ===
★ Maureen Samuels - Art of the Dance Academy

=== The Michael Landon Award ===
==== Outstanding Contribution to Youth Through Television ====
★ Ann Eldridge, Producer - Girl of the Limberlost, PBS WonderWorks Drama
★ George Taweel, Producer - McGee and Me!, TLC Productions Video series

=== The Jackie Coogan Award ===
==== Outstanding Contribution to Youth Through Entertainment ====
★ Al Burton, Producer

=== Best Young Performer in a Foreign Film ===
★ Anders Danielsen Lie (Norway) - Herman

=== Best Foreign Film ===
★ Herman (Norway)
