= Ralph (Lord of the Flies) =

Fictional character of Lord of the Flies

- Lord of the Flies character
- Ralph, portrayed by Balthazar Getty
- Created by: William Golding
- Portrayed by: James Aubrey (1963 film); Balthazar Getty (1990 film); Winston Sawyers (television series)

In-universe information
- Gender: Male
- Occupation: Student
- Nationality: British (novel; 1963 film; TV Series); American (1990 film)

Ralph is a fictional character and the major protagonist in William Golding's novel Lord of the Flies. He is a student and the first leader of the boys in the island. Ralph represents democracy and order. He was played by James Aubrey in the 1963 film adaptation, Balthazar Getty in the 1990 film adaptation, and Winston Sawyers in the TV series.

== Allegorical interpretation ==
Ralph is the allegory of order and democracy. He is also the direct antithesis of Jack Merridew, who portrays power, violence and savagery.

Ralph is elected chief, and takes it very seriously. He tries to keep order and maintain things civilised, and to make them be rescued. But, soon, the boys leave him to join Jack, who becomes the new chief, and whose hunger for power and obsession for hunting represents the end of order and democracy.

== Character overview ==
Ralph is the first boy being introduced in the novel. Soon after being stranded on the island, he meets a chubby boy, nicknamed Piggy, who asks him to not reveal his name to the others.

Shortly after, they find a conch shell. Ralph blows it, and manages to reunite all the boys. An election to decide who will be chief takes place, between him and Jack. Ralph eventually is the winner, to Jack's frustration.

Ralph tries to maintain order, and creates rules; for example, during a meeting, whoever wants to speak can do it, but not without holding the conch. Ralph also tries to maintain a signal fire so they can be rescued, and shelters, where they can sleep. But most boys start to ignore the importance of this task, and many join Jack in the hunting for pigs, with the only person helping Ralph with the shelters being Simon. Ralph slowly grows tired of trying to maintain order, and starts to forget his goal of being rescued.

Some boys start to mention a beast, to which Ralph replies that there isn't such thing. However, the fear of the imaginary beast starts to increase, leading to a supposed sighting, and a hunt for it.

During the meeting, after the boys saw the beast (which was actually the corpse of a dead pilot), Ralph and Jack have an argument, where is noticeable how the way of thinking of both boys are quite different, ending with Jack splitting from the rest of the group to form his own tribe. Eventually, he gains many followers, and Ralph's influence towards the others starts to decrease.

After a successful hunt, Jack invites Ralph and his remaining followers to participate in his feast, which they eventually agree. Everyone is in the feast, except Simon. When a storm comes, Jack and his tribe start to do a frenzied dance, and Ralph and Piggy, who were at first reluctant, decide to join them. Simon appears in the dark, but the boys mistake him for the beast, thus killing him.

The next day, Ralph feels genuine remorse towards Simon's death, and starts blaming himself, but Piggy tries to convince him that it was just an accident.

At night, Jack's tribe steals Piggy's specs, so they could light a fire. Ralph goes to Castle Rock with Piggy and the twins, Samneric, to try to reason with the hunters. But things don't work well, and Ralph and Jack start fighting each other. When they stop, Jack orders his tribe to capture Samneric. Suddenly, Roger pushes a boulder towards Piggy, killing him, to everyone's shock. Ralph runs and hides from the hunters.

Near the end, Ralph meets secretly with the twins, who reveal that Jack had plans to hunt Ralph down the next day. Ralph reveals where he will be hiding, but Samneric later reveal to the tribe where he is, after being tortured.

Jack and his group try to smoke Ralph out, and he flees to the beach. But a Navy Officer sees the smoke and lands on the island, making everyone freeze, and realise what they've done. Ralph has a small conversation with the officer, who scolds them for not being able to behave properly. Ralph starts weeping for the end of his innocence and Piggy's death, and soon all the other boys start to cry too. The Navy Officer turns around, embarrassed with that scene, and looks at the cruiser in the distance.

== Portrayals ==
=== 1963 film ===
In the 1963 film, Ralph is portrayed by James Aubrey.

=== 1990 film ===
In the 1990 film adaptation, he is portrayed by Balthazar Getty. In this version, he is American, unlike other adaptations and the original story. Getty was nominated for the Young Artist Award, for Outstanding Young Ensemble Cast in a Motion Picture for his performance.

=== 2026 TV series ===
In the 2026 television series, Ralph is portrayed by Winston Sawyers. His performance was well praised by critics.

=== Graphic novel ===
An award-winning graphic novel adaptation of Lord of the Flies, by Aimée de Jongh, was released in 2024. Ralph resembles the one from the novel much more than other adaptations.

=== Theatrical release ===
The story was firstly adapted to stage in 1984, adapted by Elliot Watkins, a teacher. Golding gave his personal consent.

=== Radio ===
A radio adaptation, by Judith Adams, was released in 2013. Finn Bennett portrayed Ralph.

== Characterisation ==
=== Physical appearance ===
In the book, Ralph is described as an athletic boy, with tan skin, boxer-like shoulders, and fair hair.

=== Personality ===
Ralph is the symbol of democracy, government and order. He is charismatic, and his primary focus was to find ways so the boys could be rescued. He was elected leader at the beginning, winning against Jack, and his influence towards the boys is secure at first.

Throughout the beginning of the novel, Ralph tries to create rules and keep order and civilisation. He also attempts to keep a signal fire and building huts to improve the boys' chances of being rescued. But the boys ignore this tasks, his influence declines, and Jack subverts him completely.

Over the course of the story, Ralph grows tired of trying to maintain order, and starts to loose sight of his goal of trying to be rescued, with his only reminder being Piggy. Despite being quite disdainful of Piggy at first, he becomes one of his few allies left.

Ralph is shown as the only boy who actually feels remorse for Simon's death, and blames himself for it. In the end, after Piggy's death, the boys try to hunt him down. Ralph flees in a desperate attempt to run away from them, and reaches the beach, where a Navy Officer is present. Ralph breaks down in tears, and cries for the loss of innocence, the evil in man's heart, and the death of his friend Piggy.
