= A Family for Joe =

1990 American TV series

- Genre: Sitcom
- Created by: Arnold Margolin
- Written by: Philip Rosenthal; Oliver Goldstick
- Starring: Robert Mitchum; Juliette Lewis; Ben Savage; Jessica Player; David Lascher; Barry Gordon
- Country of origin: United States
- Original language: English
- No. of seasons: 1
- No. of episodes: 9

Production
- Executive producers: Sonny Grosso; Larry Jacobson
- Running time: 30 minutes
- Production companies: Grosso-Jacobson Productions; NBC Productions; Feature Films For Families

Original release
- Network: NBC
- Release: March 24 – August 19, 1990

A Family for Joe is an American sitcom that starred Robert Mitchum in the title role. It started out as a television movie that aired NBC on February 25, 1990, before turning it into a series that lasted from March 24 until August 19, 1990. Nine episodes of the series were filmed.

== Plot ==
A Family for Joe is about the Bankston children, 13-year-old Nick (Chris Furrh), 11-year-old Holly (Maia Brewton), 9-year-old Chris (Jarrad Paul), and 7-year-old Mary (Jessica Player) who have been recently orphaned. Rather than have themselves split up into foster care, they find a homeless man, Joe (Robert Mitchum), to live with them and act as their grandfather. It isn't until Joe is granted monitored guardianship of the children by a family court judge when the real trial between him and them all begins.

== Cast ==
- Robert Mitchum as Joe Whitaker
- Maia Brewton as Holly Bankston (original film)
- Juliette Lewis as Holly Bankston (series)
- Chris Furrh as Nick Bankston (original film)
- David Lascher as Nick Bankston (series)
- Barry Gordon as Roger Hightower
- Jarrad Paul as Chris Bankston (original film)
- Ben Savage as Chris Bankston (series)
- Jessica Player as Mary Bankston
- Barbara Babcock as Miss Collins
- David Nelson as George Merkel
- Anna Mathias as Annie Brewster
- Jim Hackett as Pete Brewster
- Janet MacLachlan as Judge Delaney
- Patrick Cronin as Mr. Reed
- Robert Casper as Mr. Edwards
- Richard X. Slattery as Officer Finney
- Maggie Egan as Mrs. Lewis
- John Mitchum as Preacher
- Helena Carroll as Mrs. Spruce
- Beverly Sanders as Doctor Bennett
- Patrick Campbell as Homeless Man
- Dorothy Neumann as Bag Lady
- Dennis Fimple as Man at Mission Door
- Dartanian as Punk 1
- Andrew Roperto as Punk 2
- Hugo Huizar as Punk 3
- Andrew Margolin as Young Cop
- Diane Almeida as Nurse
- Julie Ashton as Bank Cashier
- Sam Denoff as Slamburger Manager
- Nikki Cox as Carrie Lewis
- Gretchen Learman as Valerie Brewster
- Jacqueline Caru as Bonnie Brewster
- Justin Shenkarow as Pete Brewster Jr.
- Brandon Loomis as Student / BoyScout
- Jorga Caye as AA Meeting Attendee

== Episodes ==
=== TV Movie ===
Title	Directed by	Written by	Original release date
"A Family for Joe"	Jeff Melman	Arnold Margolin	February 25, 1990

=== Episodes ===
No.	Title	Directed by	Written by	Original release date
1	"A Little Romance"	Alan Rafkin	Story by : Mady Julian & Carrie Honigblum & Renee Phillips; Teleplay by : Oliver Goldstick & Phil Rosenthal & David A. Caplan & Brian LaPan	March 24, 1990
2	"The Medium"	Unknown	Unknown	March 31, 1990
3	"Nick's Heart"	Unknown	Unknown	April 7, 1990
4	"An Earful"	Alan Rafkin	Oliver Goldstick & Phil Rosenthal	April 14, 1990
5	"Life of the Party"	Unknown	Unknown	April 28, 1990
6	"Law and Order"	Alan Rafkin	Arnold Kane	May 5, 1990
7	"Once a Bum"	Unknown	Unknown	August 5, 1990
8	"Night School"	Unknown	Unknown	August 12, 1990
9	"Having a Baby"	Alan Rafkin	Renee Phillips & Carrie Honigblum	August 19, 1990

== Response ==
Ken Tucker of Entertainment Weekly rated the series a D, stating that "the kids are leering little creeps, the jokes are moronic, and Joe's homelessness is already absent from the show's current scripts".

In the documentary series The Write Environment, writer Philip Rosenthal (who would go on to create Everybody Loves Raymond) talks about being a staff writer on the series.
