= Danuel =

Danuel is a given name. Notable people with the name include:

- Danuel House Jr. (born 1993), American basketball player
- Danuel Pipoly (born 1978), American actor

== See also ==
- Daniel (given name), a given name and surname
