= Magnificence (play) =

1973 play written by Howard Brenton

- Written by: Howard Brenton
- Original language: English
- Subject: Left-wing radicalism
- Setting: 1970s London

Premiere
- Date premiered: 28 June 1973
- Place premiered: Royal Court Theatre

Magnificence is a 1973 play by English playwright Howard Brenton. It premiered at the Royal Court Theatre and was next performed on the London stage in 2016, at the Finborough Theatre.

== Synopsis ==
Magnificence has two plotlines. Firstly, five far-left revolutionaries squat an unoccupied house in London. Secondly, a Conservative cabinet MP loses faith in himself. The two plotlines converge in the final scene, where Jed (one of the revolutionaries) accidentally kills both himself and the MP with plastic explosive.

The published text of the play takes as its epigraph lines from Brecht's Die Maßnahme:

Sink into the mire
Embrace the butcher
But change the world.

== Productions ==
=== Premiere ===
Magnificence premiered at the Royal Court Theatre on 28 June 1973 with the following cast:

- Will - Michael Kitchen
- Jed - Kenneth Cranham
- Mary - Carole Hayman
- Veronica - Dinah Stabb
- Cliff - Pete Postlethwaite
- Constable - James Aubrey
- Slaughter - Leonard Fenton
- Alice - Geoffrey Chater
- Babs - Robert Eddison
- Old Man/Lenin - Nikolaj Ryjtkov

It was directed by Max Stafford-Clark, designed by William Dudley and the lighting was by Andy Phillips. Irving Wardle, writing in The Times, called it a wonderful piece of theatre.

=== 2016 ===
Magnificence was performed at the Finborough Theatre in 2016, marking its first appearance in London since the premiere. The reviews were favourable, with the Evening Standard commenting that "Brenton’s vision of revolutionary zeal is memorably strange". For BroadwayWorld the play was "both epic and intimate" and the Guardian wrote that "the play’s anger about the co-existence of homelessness and empty property still strikes a chord".
