= Balthazar Getty =

American actor and musician (born 1975)

- Born: Paul Balthazar Getty; January 22, 1975 (age 51); Tarzana, California, U.S.
- Other name: Balt Getty
- Occupations: Actor; musician; DJ
- Years active: 1987–present
- Spouse: Rosetta Millington (m. 2000)
- Children: 5
- Parents: John Paul Getty III (father); Gisela Getty (mother)
- Family: Getty

Paul Balthazar Getty (/ˈɡɛti/; born January 22, 1975) is an American actor, musician, and DJ, and a member of the Getty family. His acting debut was in Lord of the Flies (1990) as Ralph. He went on to appear in Lost Highway (1997) and had a recurring role as Richard Montana in Charmed (2003–04), Thomas Grace on the American action drama Alias (2005–06), and Tommy Walker on the American drama Brothers & Sisters (2006–11).

As a musician, Getty is a member of the indie rock/electronic band Ringside, and is the producer for hip-hop duo The Wow.

== Early life ==
Paul Balthazar Getty was born January 22, 1975, in Tarzana, California, and brought up in San Francisco before being educated in the United Kingdom at Gordonstoun, Scotland. He was born to father John Paul Getty III and is a descendant of grandfather Sir John Paul Getty and great-grandfather J. Paul Getty, founder of Getty Oil, and at one time one of the richest men in the world, namesake for the Getty Center museum. His mother, Gisela Getty (née Schmidt), is a German-born professional photographer and documentary filmmaker. His parents divorced in 1993. Balthazar's half-sister, Anna Getty (née Zacher) is his mother's daughter and was adopted by Getty III during their marriage.

== Film career ==
Getty began his acting career at age 12 in 1987. He auditioned for the lead role in the movie Lord of the Flies after being spotted by a casting director Robin Joy Allan, in his art class at school. During the 1990s and early 2000s, he appeared in the films Young Guns II, Natural Born Killers, Judge Dredd, Mr. Holland's Opus, White Squall, Lost Highway, Big City Blues, The Center of the World, Deuces Wild, Ladder 49, Numb3rs, Feast, and the television miniseries Traffic.

Getty guest-starred on the television series Charmed as Richard Montana, a male witch romantically linked with Paige Matthews. He appeared in the fifth season of the television show Alias as Agent Thomas Grace. He starred, alongside Alias costar Ron Rifkin, in the ABC prime time drama Brothers & Sisters, which first aired in September 2006. Getty played the role of Thomas "Tommy" Walker, third-born of the five Walker siblings.

In late 2008, media reports indicated Getty's contract as a full-time series regular in Brothers & Sisters would not be renewed due, in part, to budgetary and storyline considerations. In the Season 4 premiere, Getty was still listed in the principal cast, but he did not appear. Getty made his return to the series in the sixth episode of Season 4. Although he no longer appeared in every episode, he continued to make appearances on the show until its cancellation.

Getty started DJing and making electronic music at age 15. He is a member of the indie rock/electronic band Ringside, and is the producer for hip-hop duo The Wow.

In 2013, he operated a record label called Purplehaus Records. He started Purplehaus Productions in the Fairfax and Melrose district in Los Angeles.

== Charity work ==
Getty is on the board of directors for The Lunchbox Fund, a non-profit organization providing daily meals to township school students in Soweto, South Africa.

== Personal life ==
In 2000, Getty married fashion designer Rosetta Millington. They have five children: three daughters, named Grace, Violet Leigh, and June Catherine and sons Cassius Paul and Wolfgang Israel. Cassius's godfather was Getty's close friend and fellow actor Eric Dane. Getty had a highly publicized affair with English actress Sienna Miller in 2008, but later reconciled with his wife.

== Filmography ==
Film
Year	Film	Role	Notes
1990	Lord of the Flies	Ralph	Young Artist Award Nominated for Best Young Actor Starring in a Motion Picture
1990	Young Guns II	Tom O'Folliard	Alternative title: Young Guns II: Blaze of Glory
1991	My Heroes Have Always Been Cowboys	Jud, Jolie's Son	
1991	The Pope Must Die	Joe Don Dante	Alternative title: The Pope Must Diet
1991	December	Allister Gibbs	
1992	Halfway House		
1992	Where the Day Takes You	Little J	
1993	Red Hot	Alexi	Alternative title: Fièvre Rouge
1994	Cityscrapes: Los Angeles	Leader	
1994	Dead Beat	Rudy	Alternative title: The Phony Perfector
1994	Natural Born Killers	Gas Station Attendant	
1994	Don't Do It	Jake	
1995	Toughguy	Chad's Friend	Alternative titles: Evil Never Sleeps and Terrified
1995	Judge Dredd	Olmeyer	
1995	Mr. Holland's Opus	Stadler	
1996	White Squall	Tod Johnstone	
1997	Lost Highway	Pete Dayton	
1997	Habitat	Andreas Symes	
1998	Fait Accompli	A.J. Merchant	Alternative title: Voodoo Dawn
1999	Big City Blues	Walter	
1999	Out in Fifty	Lefty	
2000	Shadow Hours	Michael Holloway	Co-producer
2000	Four Dogs Playing Poker	Julian	Alternative title: 4 Dogs Playing Poker
2001	Sol Goode	Sol Goode	
2001	MacArthur Park	Steve	
2001	The Center of the World	Brian Pivano	Alternative title: The Centre of the World
2001	Sluts & Losers	-	Co-executive producer
2002	Hard Cash	Eddie	Alternative title: Run for the Money
2002	Deuces Wild	Jimmy Pockets	
2004	Ladder 49	Ray Gauquin	
2005	Slingshot	Taylor	
2005	Feast	Bozo	
2006	The Tripper	Jimmy	
2008	West of Brooklyn	Man at door	
2008	Struggle	Jack	
2012	Big Sur	Michael McClure	
2014	The Judge	Deputy Hanson	
2015	Unity	Narrator	Documentary
2015	Horror	Harry Cox	
2021	Kid 90	Himself	Documentary
2024	Megalopolis	Aram Kazanjian	

Television
Year	Title	Role	Notes
1989	Nightmare Classics	Miles	1 episode
1997	The Hunger	James Chandler	1 episode
2001–2002	Pasadena	Nate Greeley	13 episodes
2003–2004	Charmed	Richard Montana	6 episodes
2004	Traffic	Ben Edmonds	Miniseries
2005	Into the West	David Wheeler	1 episode
2005–2006	Alias	Thomas Grace	Main cast (Season 5): 15 episodes
2006	Dirtbags	Scotty	Television movie
2006–2011	Brothers & Sisters	Tommy Walker	Main cast (Season 1–4); Guest (Season 5): 72 episodes
2010	Rizzoli & Isles	Tom Garvin	1 episode
2010	Hawaii Five-0	Walton Dawkins	1 episode
2014	House of Lies	Zaninno	1 episode
2017	When We Rise	David	2 episodes
2017	Twin Peaks	Red	3 episodes

== Awards and nominations ==
Year	Award	Category	Work	Result
1991	Young Artist Award	Best Young Actor Starring Role in a Motion Picture	Lord of the Flies	Nominated
1991	Young Artist Award	Outstanding Young Ensemble Cast in a Motion Picture	Lord of the Flies	Nominated
1991	Young Artist Award	Best Young Actor Supporting Role in a Motion Picture	Young Guns II	Nominated
1991	Young Artist Award	Best Young Actor Starring Role in a Motion Picture	My Heroes Have Always Been Cowboys	Nominated
2005	Golden Satellite Award	Best Actor in a Supporting Role in a Series, Miniseries or Motion Picture Made for Television	Traffic: The Miniseries	Nominated
