= Big City Blues (1997 film) =

1997 film by Clive Fleury

- Film poster
- Directed by: Clive Fleury
- Written by: Clive Fleury
- Produced by: Clive Fleury; Robyn Knoll; Brad Wyman
- Starring: Burt Reynolds; William Forsythe; Giancarlo Esposito
- Cinematography: David Bridges
- Edited by: Tom Seid
- Music by: Tomás San Miguel
- Distributed by: Avalanche Home Entertainment
- Release date: 1997
- Running time: 94 minutes
- Country: United States
- Language: English

Big City Blues is a 1997 American comedy drama film written and directed by Clive Fleury and starring Burt Reynolds and William Forsythe.

== Plot ==
A collection of characters cross paths during a night in the big city. Two hit men. who receive their contracts from an Englishman. collide with a beautiful prostitute who dreams of a career as a model and is searching for her doppelgänger. The hitmen also encounter two transvestites named Babs and Georgie.

== Cast ==
- Burt Reynolds as Connor
- William Forsythe as Hudson
- Giancarlo Esposito as Georgie
- Arye Gross as Babs
- Georgina Cates as Angela
- Balthazar Getty as Walter
- Michael O'Hagan as Morrisey
- Donovan Leitch Jr. as Donovan
