= Traffic (miniseries) =

- Directed by: Eric Bross; Stephen Hopkins
- Starring: Mary McCormack; Balthazar Getty
- Country of origin: United States
- No. of seasons: 1
- No. of episodes: 3

Production
- Executive producers: Ron Hutchinson; Colin Cotter; Graham King
- Producers: Stephen Hopkins; Jay Benson

Original release
- Network: USA Network
- Release: 2004 – 2004

Traffic is a three-part miniseries that aired on the United States cable channel USA Network in 2004, featuring an ensemble cast portraying the complex world of drugs, their distribution, the associated violence, and the wide variety of people whose lives are touched by it all.

== Production ==
The miniseries was inspired by the 1989 Channel 4 television miniseries Traffik and the 2000 motion picture Traffic directed by Steven Soderbergh.

== Reception ==
The American version was nominated for three Emmy Awards.

Year	Award	Category	Nominee	Result
2004	Primetime Emmy Awards	Outstanding Miniseries	Ron Hutchinson (executive producer) Colin Cotter (executive producer) Graham King (executive producer) Stephen Hopkins (producer) Jay Benson (produced by)	Nominated
2004	Primetime Emmy Awards	Outstanding Casting for a Miniseries, Movie or a Special	Mary Jo Slater (casting by) Steve Brooksbank (casting by) Stuart Aikins (casting by)	Nominated
2004	Primetime Emmy Awards	Outstanding Single-Camera Sound Mixing for a Miniseries or a Movie	Kevin Patrick Burns (re-recording mixer) Marc Fishman (re-recording mixer) Tony Lamberti (re-recording mixer) Eric Batut (production sound mixer)	Nominated
2004	Casting Society of America	Best Casting for TV Miniseries	Mary Jo Slater (casting by) Steve Brooksbank (casting by) Stuart Aikins (casting by)	Won
2004	Gold Derby Awards	TV Miniseries		Nominated
2004	OFTA Television Award	Best Miniseries		Nominated
2004	OFTA Television Award	Best Ensemble in a Motion Picture or Miniseries		Nominated
2004	OFTA Television Award	Best Direction of a Motion Picture or Miniseries	Eric Bross Stephen Hopkins	Nominated
2004	OFTA Television Award	Best Writing of a Motion Picture or Miniseries	Ron Hutchinson	Nominated
2004	OFTA Television Award	Best Editing in a Motion Picture or Miniseries		Nominated
2004	OFTA Television Award	Best Sound in a Motion Picture or Miniseries		Nominated
2005	Prism Award	TV Movie or Miniseries		Nominated
2005	Prism Award	Performance in a TV Movie or Miniseries	Mary McCormack	Nominated
2005	Golden Satellite Award	Best Actor in a Supporting Role in a Series, Miniseries or Motion Picture Made for Television	Balthazar Getty	Nominated
