= Damon Lindelof =

American screenwriter and producer (born 1973)

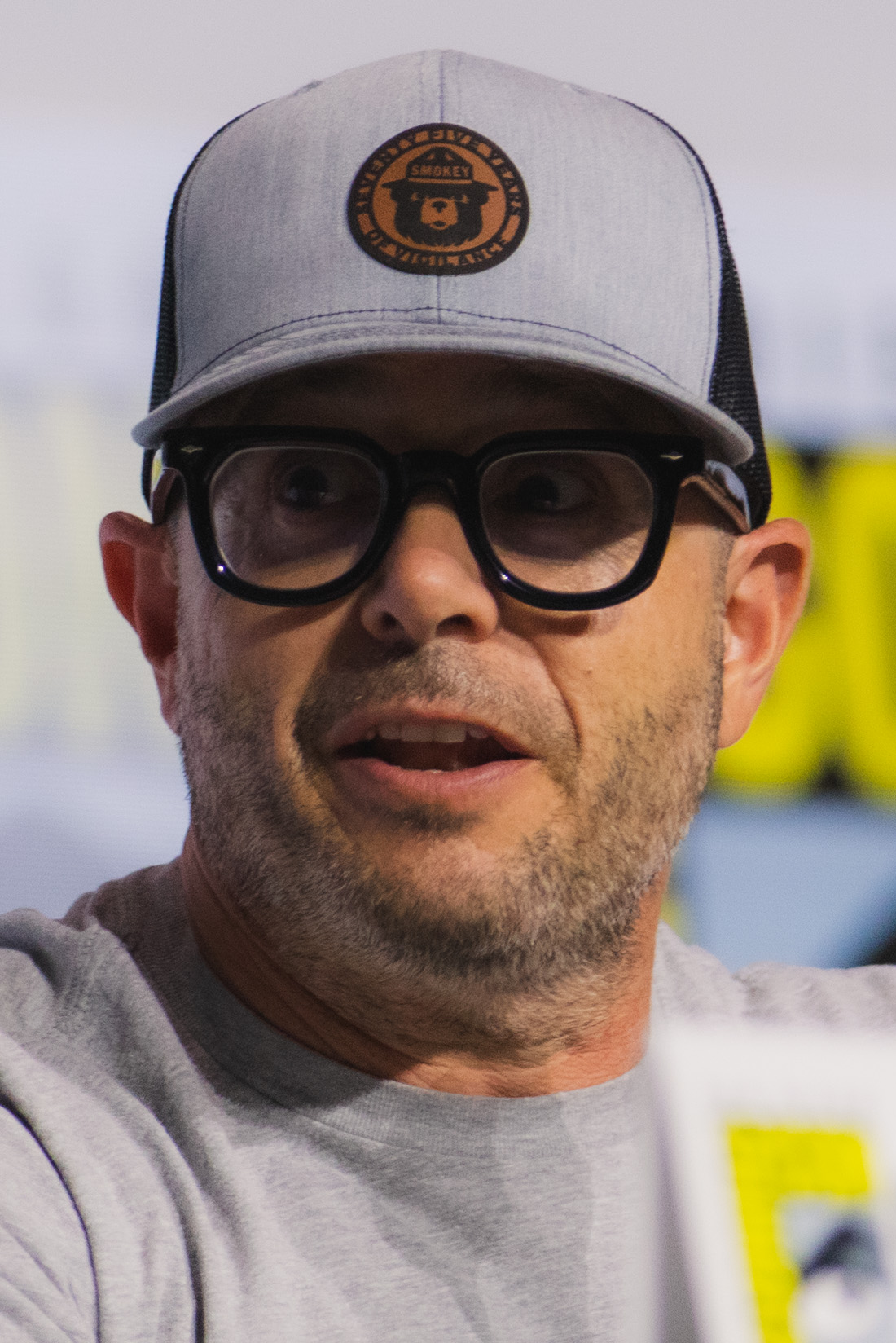
- Lindelof in 2026
- Born: Damon Laurence Lindelof; April 24, 1973 (age 53); Englewood, New Jersey, U.S.
- Occupations: Screenwriter; producer; director
- Years active: 1999–present
- Spouse: Heidi Mary Fugeman (m. 2005)
- Children: 1

Damon Laurence Lindelof (born April 24, 1973) is an American screenwriter, comic book writer, and producer. Among his accolades, he has received three Primetime Emmy Awards, from twelve nominations. In 2010, Time magazine named him one of the 100 most influential people in the world.

Lindelof is best known as the creator and showrunner of numerous critically acclaimed television series, such as the ABC science fiction drama series Lost (2004–2010), the HBO supernatural drama series The Leftovers (2014–2017), the HBO superhero limited series Watchmen (2019), and the Peacock science fiction limited series Mrs. Davis (2023).

Lindelof was also a writer on the CBS crime drama series Nash Bridges (2000–2001) and the NBC crime drama series Crossing Jordan (2001–2004). He co-wrote the films Cowboys & Aliens (2011), Prometheus (2012), Star Trek Into Darkness (2013), World War Z (2013), and Tomorrowland (2015). Alongside Chris Mundy and Tom King, he is the co-creator of the series Lanterns (2026), which is part of the DC Universe (DCU).

== Early life, family and education ==
Lindelof was born on April 24, 1973, in Englewood, New Jersey. His mother, Susan (Klausner), is a teacher, and his father, David Herbert Lindelof, is a bank manager. Lindelof's mother is Ashkenazi Jewish, with family from Białystok, Poland. His father's ancestry included Swedish (where his Lindelof great-grandfather was born, in Vellinge, Malmöhus), Norwegian, Spanish, and German. Lindelof celebrated his Bar Mitzvah in Teaneck, New Jersey, where he attended synagogue.

Lindelof attended Teaneck High School, a school whose diverse student body he credits with expanding his horizons as a writer. He has stated, "I was a Jewish white kid growing up in Teaneck, but at the same time, I had African and Filipino and Asian friends and to have that experience all through high school while getting an awesome education was wonderful." He attended film school at New York University, performing briefly in the band Petting Zoo, and moved to Los Angeles after graduating.

== Career ==
=== 1999–2003: Early career and breakthrough ===
An early boost to Lindelof's writing career came in 1999, when he was selected as a semifinalist for a Nicholl Fellowship for his screenplay Perfectionists. Before this, he had worked on reviewing scripts at Paramount, Fox, and Alan Ladd studios.

In 1999, Lindelof began his professional career as a writer on the drama series Wasteland and the anthology series Undressed. He received further attention as a writer on the CBS crime drama series Nash Bridges, which he worked on from 2000 to 2001. He then wrote and produced the NBC crime drama series Crossing Jordan, which he worked on until the end of its third season.

=== 2004–2010: Lost and commercial success ===
In 2004, Lindelof received further recognition and success as an executive producer and showrunner (alongside Carlton Cuse) on the drama series Lost. The series was praised for its unique brand of storytelling and strong characters. The first two seasons of the show were ratings juggernauts and the show never fell out of the Top 30 throughout its six seasons on the air. Lindelof's work on Lost garnered numerous awards and nominations throughout its run, including winning the Primetime Emmy Award for Outstanding Drama Series in 2005.

Lindelof and the Lost writing staff won the Writers Guild of America Award for Best Dramatic Series at the February 2006 ceremony for their work on the first and second seasons. He was nominated for the WGA Award for Best Dramatic Series a further three times: namely, the February 2007 ceremony for his work on the second and third seasons, at the February 2009 ceremony for his work on the fourth season and at the February 2010 ceremony for his work on the fifth season. Lindelof and his co-writer Drew Goddard were also nominated for the WGA Award for Best Episodic Drama at the February 2008 ceremony for writing the episode "Flashes Before Your Eyes".

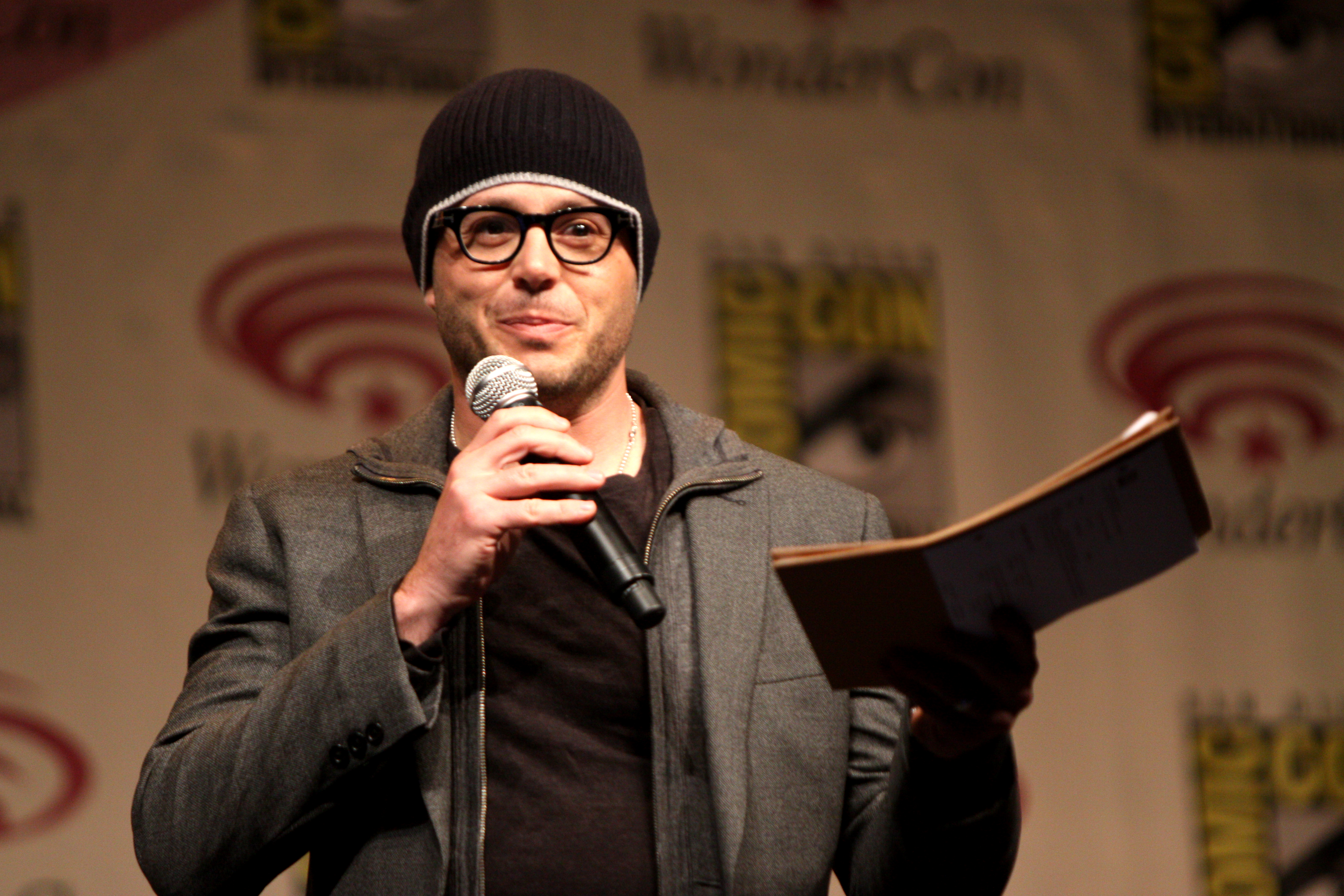
Lindelof at WonderCon, 2012

Lindelof and co-showrunner Carlton Cuse have been heralded as two of the first to truly embrace the changing times with things such as their daily podcast and being active in the fan community. A majority of the six seasons were met with critical praise, but both Lindelof and Cuse were not afraid to address critiques on the show, be it through the podcast or other forms of media. However, Lindelof said in late 2013 that he would no longer be addressing those displeased with the way the show ended, stating:

And what do I do? I jump at the opportunity to acknowledge how many people were dissatisfied with how it ended. I try to be self-deprecating and witty when I do this, but that's an elaborate (or obvious?) defense mechanism to let people know I'm fully aware of the elephant in the room and I'm perfectly fine with it sitting down on my face and shitting all over me ... And here's my part: I will finally stop talking about it. I'm not doing this because I feel entitled or above it — I'm doing it because I accept that I will not change hearts nor minds. I will not convince you they weren't dead the whole time, nor resent you for believing they were despite my infinite declarations otherwise.

Lindelof was featured on a December 2008 episode of The Write Environment, a public television series featuring in-depth, candid one-on-one interviews with some of TV's most prolific and well-known series creator and writers. The interview is also available on DVD.

While approaching the end of Lost, it was rumored that Lindelof and series co-creator J. J. Abrams would write and direct a film adaptation of Stephen King's The Dark Tower series. Lindelof dismissed this in a Q&A with USA Today in late 2009. He commented, "After working six years on Lost, the last thing I want to do is spend the next seven years adapting one of my favorite books of all time. I'm such a massive Stephen King fan that I'm terrified of screwing it up. I'd do anything to see those movies written by someone else. My guess is they will get made because they're so incredible. But not by me." Lindelof later served as co-producer on the 2009 science fiction action film, Star Trek, which was directed by frequent collaborator J. J. Abrams.

In May 2023, Lindelof and Cuse were accused of fostering a "toxic workplace" by several cast members and writers during their tenure on Lost. In an excerpt from the book Burn It Down: Power, Complicity, and a Call for Change in Hollywood, author Maureen Ryan interviewed various actors, writers, and crew members from the series on the alleged toxicity behind the scenes. Multiple sources claimed that Lindelof had said about the departure of Harold Perrineau from the series that the actor "called me racist, so I fired his ass." Lindelof responded to the allegations by saying, "I have no recollection of those specific things. And that's not me saying that they didn't happen. I'm just saying that it's literally baffling my brain—that they did happen and that I bore witness to them or that I said them. To think that they came out of my mouth or the mouths of people that I still consider friends is just not computing." Lindelof acknowledged personal failings during his time as showrunner on Lost, saying "My level of fundamental inexperience as a manager and a boss, my role as someone who was supposed to model a climate of creative danger and risk-taking but provide safety and comfort inside of the creative process—I failed in that endeavor" and "I have significantly evolved and grown, and it shouldn't have had to come at the cost and the trauma of people that I hurt on Lost."

=== 2011–2017: The Leftovers, films, and critical acclaim ===
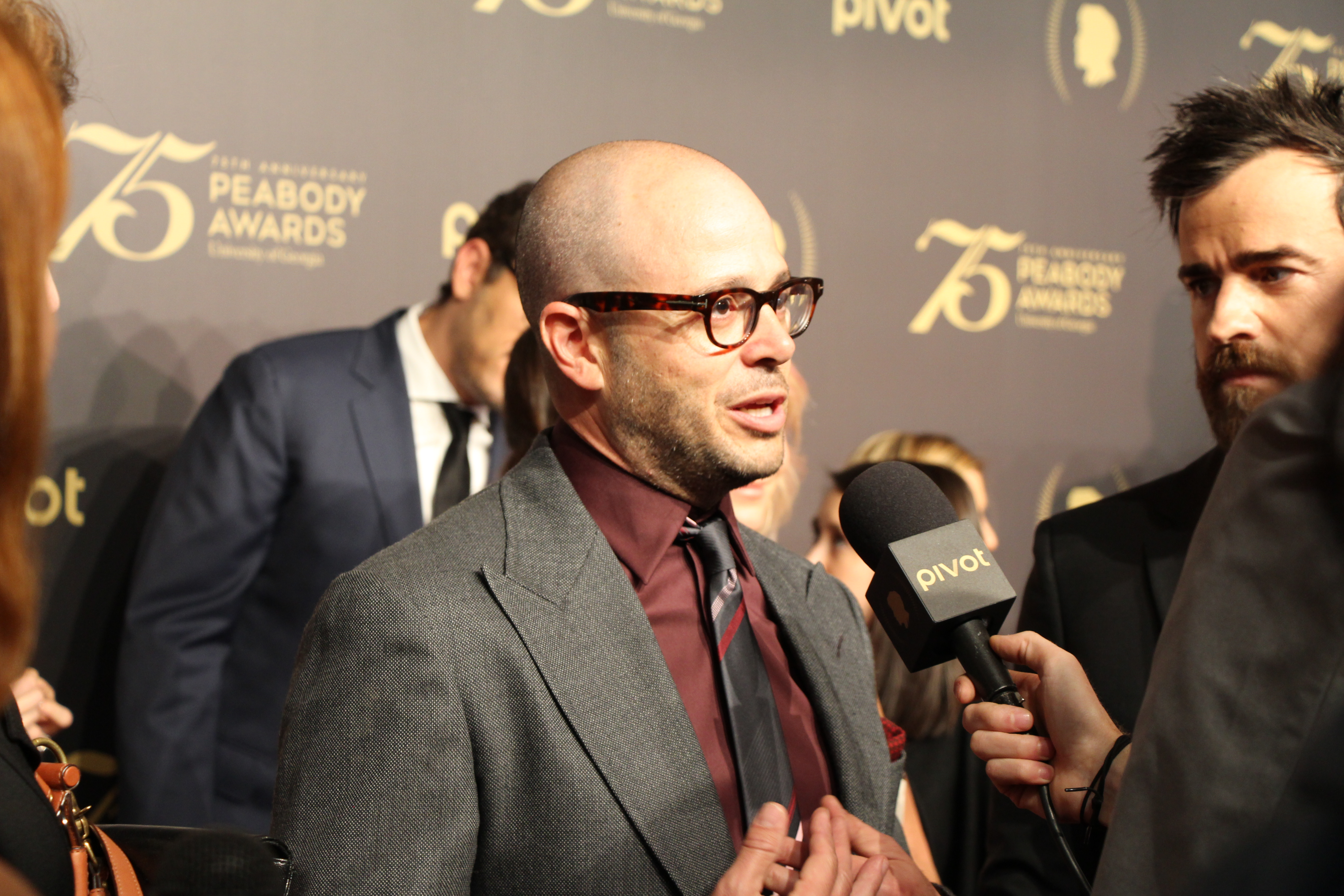
Lindelof at the Peabody Awards, 2016

In 2011, Lindelof aided in development of the fantasy series Once Upon a Time, which was created by former Lost writers Edward Kitsis and Adam Horowitz. He was not officially credited in the pilot. Also in 2011, Lindelof, Alex Kurtzman, and Roberto Orci, and several other writers, contributed to the screenplay of the film version of the comic book series Cowboys & Aliens.

Lindelof co-wrote the screenplay for Ridley Scott's science fiction film Prometheus, which was released in June 2012 to commercial success. Lindelof also produced the 2013 science fiction action sequel, Star Trek Into Darkness, and cowrote its screenplay with Kurtzman and Orci. Also that year, he co-wrote the screenplay for the action adventure film World War Z.

He co-wrote the screenplay for the science fiction adventure film Tomorrowland with director Brad Bird, based on a story by Lindelof, Bird, and Jeff Jensen. The film was in development for many years before being released in 2015.

In 2014, Lindelof co-created the HBO supernatural drama series The Leftovers with Tom Perrotta, based on Perrotta's novel of the same name. He also served as showrunner and executive producer throughout the show's three seasons. The series received widespread critical acclaim. Many critics referred to The Leftovers as one of the greatest television series of all time, with particular praise for its writing, directing, acting and thematic depth. Despite receiving average Nielsen ratings throughout its run, the series has developed a cult following.

=== 2018–present: Watchmen and further films ===
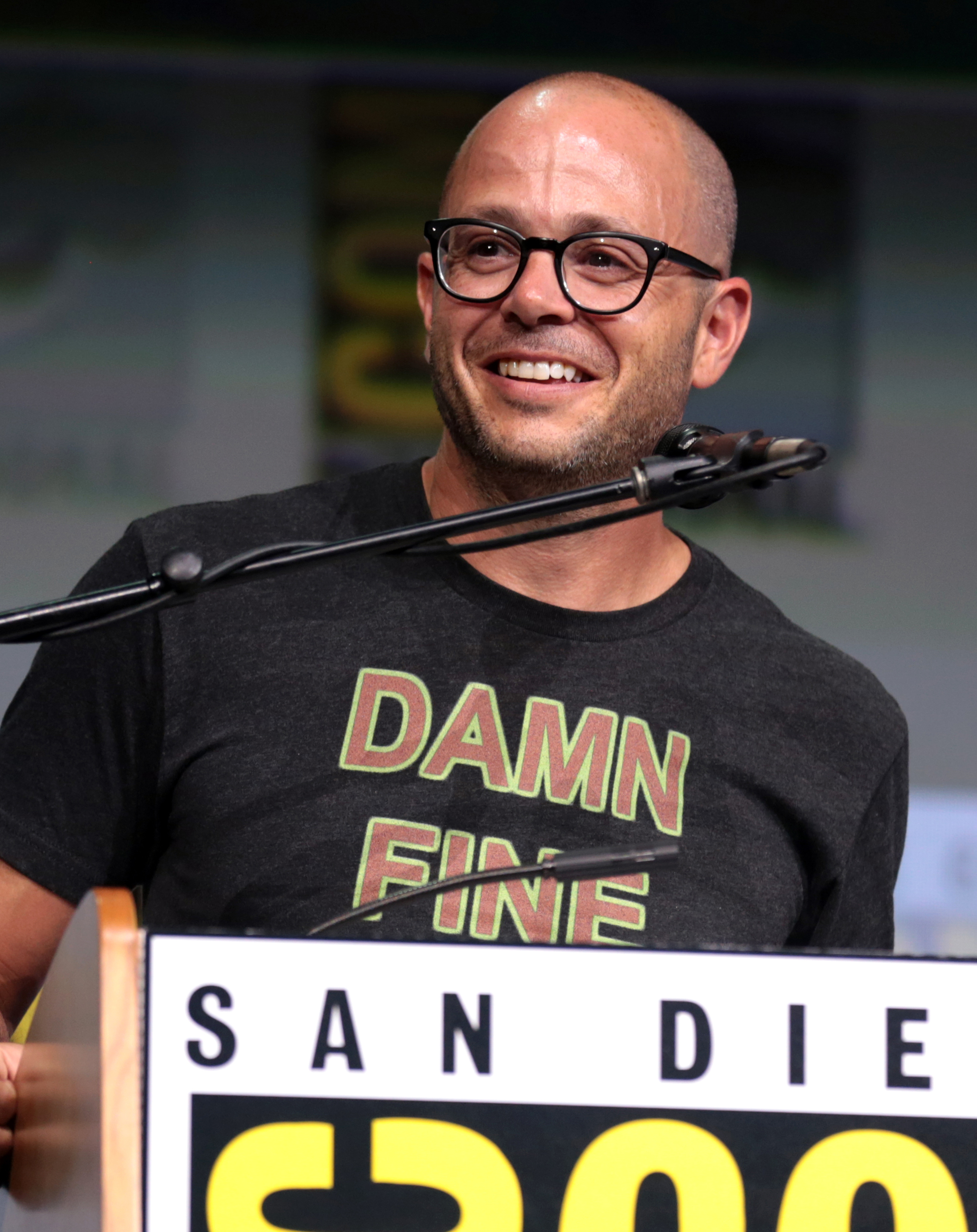
Lindelof in 2017

In August 2018, it was announced that Lindelof would be adapting Alan Moore and Dave Gibbons' Watchmen as a series for HBO. He had previously been quoted as saying it was his favorite graphic novel and a huge inspiration on Lost. The series, which features an original story set after the events of the graphic novel, premiered in 2019 to critical acclaim. On review aggregator website Rotten Tomatoes, the series has a 95% rating based on 112 reviews, with an average rating of 8.58/10. The website's critical consensus reads, "Bold and bristling, Watchmen isn't always easy viewing, but by adding new layers of cultural context and a host of complex characters it expertly builds on its source material to create an impressive identity of its own." While HBO had not confirmed a second season following the show's broadcast, Lindelof stated that if there were, he would not likely be back for it, but instead have another producer step forward to tell another story set in this universe. Lindelof said he felt that the show was "not my story" and that "These nine episodes are sort of everything that I have to say at this point about Watchmen".

In 2019, Lindelof joined a host of other writers in firing their agents as part of the WGA's stand against the ATA and the practice of packaging.

In 2020, Lindelof wrote and produced the horror thriller film The Hunt. The film attracted some media controversy for its political subject matter, and received mixed reviews upon release. After a wide release run for almost a week, COVID-19 regulations forced theaters to close, and the film subsequently played almost exclusively at drive-ins.

In 2022, Lindelof was announced as a writer of an upcoming Star Wars movie with Sharmeen Obaid-Chinoy set to direct. He turned in a draft and left the project in 2023 with Steven Knight replacing him.

In 2024, Lindelof along with Chris Mundy and Tom King wrote the pilot script and series bible for DC Universe (DCU) series Lanterns, confirmed by co-CEO of DC Studios James Gunn.

=== Comics ===
Lindelof is the writer of the six-issue comic-book miniseries Ultimate Wolverine vs. Hulk for Marvel Comics, which takes place in the Ultimate Marvel universe. It began publication in January 2006. Production was suspended after the second issue in February 2006 due to Lindelof's heavy workload elsewhere. The last of the scripts was submitted to Marvel in 2008 and the series resumed publication in March 2009.

He also wrote the first issue of the comic book series Legends of the Dark Knight (Vol. 2), published by DC comics, in June 2012.

Lindelof wrote a Rip Hunter story for Time Warp No. 1 (May 2013) which was drawn by Jeff Lemire and published by Vertigo.

== Artistry ==
=== Collaborators ===
Lindelof frequently collaborates with a tightly knit group of film professionals which include J. J. Abrams, Adam Horowitz, Alex Kurtzman, Roberto Orci, Edward Kitsis, Andre Nemec, Josh Appelbaum, Jeff Pinkner, and Bryan Burk.

=== Influences ===
Lindelof is a self-professed Stephen King fan and has placed many references to King's work into Lost, as well as mentioning within the Official Lost Podcast that The Stand serves as a huge influence. Lindelof has been quoted as saying that the graphic novel Watchmen, written by Alan Moore, is the greatest piece of popular fiction ever produced, and its effect on Lost is evident many times in the show. He has also mentioned David Lynch's Twin Peaks as a big influence for Lost.

J. J. Abrams had often cited Patrick McGoohan's similarly allegorical sci-fi/spy series The Prisoner as another major influence on Lost. Lindelof lists his favorite six films, in no particular order, as Touch of Evil, Raiders of the Lost Ark, Pulp Fiction, The Shining, Bambi, and The Godfather Part II. Lindelof is a fan of the television series The Wire, Breaking Bad, and Battlestar Galactica.

== Personal life ==
Lindelof married Heidi Mary Fugeman in 2005; the couple has one child.

== Works ==
†	Denotes productions that have not yet been released

=== Film ===
Year	Title	Writer	Producer	Notes	Ref.
2009	Star Trek	(uncredited)	Yes		
2010	Ollie Klublershturf vs. the Nazis	Yes	Executive	Short film	
2011	Cowboys & Aliens	Yes	Executive (uncredited)		
2012	Prometheus	Yes	Executive		
2013	Open Heart	No	Executive	Documentary	
2013	Star Trek Into Darkness	Yes	Yes		
2013	World War Z	Yes	No		
2015	Tomorrowland	Yes	Yes		
2017	Bending the Arc	No	Executive	Documentary	
2020	The Hunt	Yes	Yes		
2022	Another Country	No	Yes	Short film	
2025	Superman	No	No	Special thanks	
2026	Hoppers	No	No	Special thanks	

=== Television ===
Year	Title	Creator	Writer	Executive Producer	Notes	Ref.
1999	Wasteland	No	Yes	No	Episodes: "Defining Moments" and "Death Becomes Her"	
1999	Undressed	No	Yes	No	N/A	
2000–2001	Nash Bridges	No	Yes	No	Writer (5 episodes); Story editor (22 episodes)	
2001–2004	Crossing Jordan	No	Yes	Yes	Writer (9 episodes); Executive story editor (22 episodes); Co-producer (22 episodes); Supervising producer (13 episodes)	
2004–2010	Lost	Yes	Yes	Yes	Writer (45 episodes); Executive producer (121 episodes)	
2007–2008	Lost: Missing Pieces	No	Yes	Yes	Writer (3 episodes); Executive producer (13 episodes)	
2014–2017	The Leftovers	Yes	Yes	Yes	Writer (26 episodes); Executive producer (28 episodes)	
2014	Phineas and Ferb	No	Story	No	Episode: "Lost in Danville"	
2019	Watchmen	Yes	Yes	Yes	Writer (8 episodes); Executive producer (9 episodes)	
2023	Mrs. Davis	Yes	Yes	Yes	Writer (3 episodes); Executive producer (8 episodes)	
2026	Lanterns	Yes	Yes	Yes	Writer (4 episodes); Executive producer (8 episodes)	

=== Comics ===
Year	Title	Writer	Notes
2005–2009	Ultimate Wolverine vs. Hulk	Yes	Miniseries, 6 issues
2012	Legends of the Dark Knight (Vol. 2)	Yes	Issue #1
2013	Time Warp	Yes	One-shot, Story: "R.I.P."

=== Video games ===
Year	Title	Writer	Producer
2008	Find 815	No	Yes
2008	Lost: Via Domus	Yes	No

=== Acting credits ===
Year	Title	Role	Notes
2006	Lost	John Locke's Hand	Episode: "?"
2011	House	Kicking Man	Episode: "The Dig"
2012	Once Upon a Time	Bill Gozen	Episode: "7:15 A.M."
2017	The Leftovers	Man in Koala Suit	Episode: "G'Day Melbourne"

== Awards and nominations ==
Primetime Emmy Awards
Year	Category	Work	Result
2005	Outstanding Drama Series	Lost	Won
2005	Outstanding Writing for a Drama Series	Lost	Nominated
2006	Outstanding Writing for a Drama Series	Lost	Nominated
2007	Outstanding Writing for a Drama Series	Lost	Nominated
2008	Outstanding Drama Series	Lost	Nominated
2008	Outstanding Short-Format Live-Action Entertainment Program	Lost: Missing Pieces	Nominated
2009	Outstanding Drama Series	Lost	Nominated
2009	Outstanding Writing for a Drama Series	Lost	Nominated
2010	Outstanding Drama Series	Lost	Nominated
2010	Outstanding Writing for a Drama Series	Lost	Nominated
2020	Outstanding Limited Series	Watchmen	Won
2020	Outstanding Writing for a Limited Series, Movie, or Dramatic Special	Watchmen; Episode: "This Extraordinary Being"	Won

Producers Guild of America Awards
Year	Category	Work	Result
2006	Best Episodic Drama	Lost	Won
2007	Best Episodic Drama	Lost	Nominated
2008	Best Episodic Drama	Lost	Nominated
2009	Best Episodic Drama	Lost	Nominated
2010	Best Episodic Drama	Lost	Nominated
2010	Best Theatrical Motion Picture	Star Trek	Nominated
2011	Best Episodic Drama	Lost	Nominated
2020	Best Episodic Drama	Watchmen	Nominated

Writers Guild of America Awards
Year	Category	Work	Result
2006	Dramatic Series	Lost	Won
2007	Dramatic Series	Lost	Nominated
2008	Episodic Drama	Lost	Nominated
2009	Dramatic Series	Lost	Nominated
2010	Dramatic Series	Lost	Nominated
2011	Episodic Drama	Lost	Nominated
2015	Long Form – Adapted	The Leftovers	Nominated
2016	Episodic Drama	The Leftovers	Nominated
2018	Episodic Drama	The Leftovers	Nominated
2020	Drama Series	Watchmen	Nominated
2020	New Series	Watchmen	Won
