= My Heroes Have Always Been Cowboys (film) =

1991 film

- Theatrical release poster
- Directed by: Stuart Rosenberg
- Written by: Joel Don Humphreys
- Produced by: E.K. Gaylord II; Martin Poll
- Starring: Scott Glenn; Kate Capshaw; Ben Johnson; Tess Harper; Balthazar Getty; Mickey Rooney; Gary Busey
- Cinematography: Bernd Heinl
- Edited by: Dennis M. Hill
- Music by: James Horner
- Distributed by: The Samuel Goldwyn Company
- Release date: March 1, 1991
- Running time: 106 minutes
- Country: United States
- Language: English
- Box office: $3,603,615

My Heroes Have Always Been Cowboys is a 1991 American Western film starring Scott Glenn and Kate Capshaw, and directed by Stuart Rosenberg.

== Plot ==
H.D. Dalton is a champion bull rider whose career is ruined after being gored by a bull. He returns to his hometown of Guthrie, Oklahoma, to discover things have drastically changed — the family farm has been abandoned, his old girlfriend Jolie is a now a widowed mother, and his sister Cheryl has put their father Jesse in a nursing home. H.D. rescues Jesse from the home and returns him to the ranch. But when H.D. leaves the farm to visit Jolie, his father seeks out Cheryl. Cheryl retaliates by threatening to return Jesse to the nursing home and sell the ranch. At this point, H.D. takes notice of a rodeo which would give him $100,000 if he can ride four bulls for a total of 32 seconds. H.D. bonds with Jesse as he gruelingly prepares for a return to the rodeo to win the contest and buy the ranch.

== Cast ==
- Scott Glenn as H.D. Dalton
- Kate Capshaw as Jolie Meadows
- Balthazar Getty as Jud Meadows
- Ben Johnson as Jesse Dalton
- Gary Busey as Clint Hornby
- Tess Harper as Cheryl Dalton-Hornby
- Mickey Rooney as Junior
- Clarence Williams III as Deputy Sheriff Virgil
- Bill Clymer as Rodeo Announcer
- Dub Taylor as Gimme Cap

== Reception ==
Balthazar Getty was nominated for best young actor of the year by the Young Artist Awards.

Roger Ebert of the Chicago Sun-Times said, "One thing I enjoyed was the work of Scott Glenn, an unsung but always interesting actor (The Right Stuff, The River, The Silence of the Lambs), who plays the cowboy with a taciturn and weathered conviction. I also liked the unstudied sincerity of the great Ben Johnson, as his father (he was already playing this role 20 years ago, in The Last Picture Show). I liked the way old character actors like Dub Taylor turned up in a poker game, and it was fun to see Mickey Rooney, although he should have turned the energy down a notch...The most interesting element of My Heroes Have Always Been Cowboys is the cantankerous old man who is indeed impossible, and forgetful, and careless, and impossible to please. If they leave him in the nursing home he'll die, but if they let him live alone he'll sooner or later kill himself or somebody else. So what should they do about him? Because this was the only question in the movie that had not already been answered in dozens of other films, I waited for the movie to attend to it. But of course room had to be made for the Rocky ending. The score by James Horner was well received.

== See also ==
- List of American films of 1991
