= Jessica Player =

American actress (born 1982)

- Born: December 27, 1982 (age 43); Cheyenne, Wyoming, U.S.
- Occupation: Actress
- Years active: 1987–1991

Jessica Player (born December 27, 1982) is a former American child actress, best known for playing the role of Krystina Carrington, the young daughter of Krystle Carrington (played by series star Linda Evans) and Blake Carrington (played by series star John Forsythe) from 1987 to 1989 in the hit ABC drama series Dynasty. She reprised her role in the 1991 mini-series Dynasty: The Reunion.

== Filmography ==
| Year | Title | Role | Notes |
|---|---|---|---|
| 1988 | Who's the Boss? | Melissa | Episode: "Another Single Parent" |
| 1987 to 1989 | Dynasty | Krystina Carrington | 28 episodes |
| 1990 | A Family for Joe | Mary Bankston | Television movie |
| 1990 | Out of Sight, Out of Mind | Tracy Lundgren | |
| 1990 | A Family for Joe | Mary Bankston | 9 episodes |
| 1991 | Dynasty: The Reunion | Krystina Carrington | Mini-series |
