= Chris Furrh =

American former child actor

- Occupation: Actor
- Years active: 1988–1990

Chris Furrh is an American former child actor, known for starring as Jack Merridew in the 1990 film adaptation of Lord of the Flies. After this role, he played Nick Bankston in the 1990 telefilm A Family for Joe and Tommy, a castaway teenager in The Wonderful World of Disney film Exile. Then Furrh retired from acting.

== Filmography ==
=== Film ===
Year	Film	Role	Notes
1990	Lord of the Flies	Jack Merridew	Young Artist Award Nominated for Outstanding Young Ensemble Cast in a Motion Picture for Lord of the Flies
1990	Exile	Tommy	
1990	A Family for Joe	Nick Bankston	
