= James Aubrey (actor) =

English actor (1947–2010)

- Aubrey in Terror (1978)
- Born: James Aubrey Tregidgo; 28 August 1947; Klagenfurt, Austria
- Died: 6 April 2010 (aged 62); Sleaford, Lincolnshire, England
- Occupation: Actor
- Years active: 1962–2006
- Spouse: Agnes Kristin Hallander (divorced)

James Aubrey Tregidgo (28 August 1947 – 6 April 2010), known professionally as James Aubrey, was an English stage and screen actor. He trained for the stage at the Drama Centre London, some years after making his professional acting debut in a production of Isle of Children (1962) and his screen acting debut in the film adaptation of Lord of the Flies (1963). He later performed with the Royal Shakespeare Company.

== Early life and education ==
Aubrey was born in 1947 in Klagenfurt, Austria. His parents were Major Aubrey James Tregidgo and Edna May Tregidgo (née Boxall). He was educated at the Wolmer's Boys' School in Kingston, Jamaica, the Windsor Boys' School, at Hamm, in Germany, and St John's School, Singapore, before training for the stage at the Drama Centre London from 1967 to 1970.

== Stage work ==
Aubrey made his first professional stage appearance at the Wilmington Playhouse in March 1962 in the role of Philip in Isle of Children. It was in this same role that he made his Broadway theatre debut, appearing in a 1962 production at the Cort Theatre which lasted only 11 performances. From 1970 to 1972, Aubrey performed at the Citizens' Theatre in Glasgow, appearing in such roles as Andrew Aguecheek in Twelfth Night and Theridamas in Tamburlaine.

Aubrey made his London stage debut at the Royal Court Theatre in June 1973 as a police constable in the premiere of Howard Brenton's Magnificence. From 1973 to 1974, Aubrey toured with the Cambridge Theatre Company as Diggory in She Stoops to Conquer and again as Aguecheek. Aubrey performed with the Royal Shakespeare Company for their 1974–75 season, appearing in such roles as Sebastian in The Tempest and Froth in Measure for Measure. He toured with the Cambridge Theatre Company again in 1979 in the roles of Mark in The Shadow Box and Tony in From the Greek. Other venues at which Aubrey appeared include the Birmingham Repertory Theatre, the Comedy Theatre and the Old Vic.

== Screen work ==
Aubrey first appeared in a film at the age of fourteen, in the film adaptation of William Golding’s Lord of the Flies, released in 1963, taking the lead role of Ralph. He played Gavin Sorenson in the television adaptation of Bouquet of Barbed Wire (1976) and its sequel, Another Bouquet (1977). He also worked with two British filmmakers, Norman J. Warren (Terror, 1978) and Pete Walker (Home Before Midnight, 1979), and played the ill-fated pop singer B.J. in the Sex Pistols film The Great Rock 'n' Roll Swindle (1980). In 1979 played the part of Graham Hurst in the popular TV series Minder ("The Bounty Hunter") and in 1974 played Horace Reynes in The Sweeney ("Selected Target").

In 1986, Aubrey starred in Forever Young, directed by David Drury. He portrayed Mark in three episodes of Lytton's Diary in 1986. In 1997, he appeared in an adaptation of Robert Ludlum's The Apocalypse Watch and was also a guest star in an episode of the TV series Brief Encounters in 2006.

During his final months, Aubrey worked with a group of local independent film-makers. Overseeing casting sessions for Shadows of a Stranger at the Hub in Sleaford in early 2010, Aubrey was also set to play the lead role in the production, but died a month before filming began.

== Personal life ==
In 1970, at St Pancras, Aubrey married Agnes Kristin Hallander, a marriage which later ended in divorce. His daughter is Sarah Barzyk-Aubrey, a French actress.

== Death ==
Aubrey died at his home in Cranwell Village, Sleaford, on 6 April 2010, at the age of 62, suffering from pancreatitis.

== Filmography ==
Year	Title	Role	Notes
1963	Lord of the Flies	Ralph	
1973	And All Who Sail in Her	Len	TV movie
1973	The Sex Thief	1st Reporter	
1974	Z-Cars	Skipton	TV series, episode "Mugs"
1975	Galileo	Monk-Scholar	
1975	The ITV Play	Franz Haufmann	TV series, episode "A House in Regent Place: Why Weren't We Warned?"
1976	Bouquet of Barbed Wire	Gavin Sorenson	TV miniseries, 7 episodes
1976	Murder	Mike	TV series, episode "A Variety of Passion"
1976	The Sweeney	Horace Reynes	TV series, episode "Selected Target"
1977	Another Bouquet	Gavin Sorenson	TV miniseries, 7 episodes
1978–1983	BBC Play of the Month	Lacroix / The Prince	TV series, 2 episodes
1978	Terror	Philip	
1979	Return of the Saint	Ingo	TV series, episode "Appointment in Florence"
1979	Home Before Midnight	Mike Beresford	
1979	Minder	Graham Hurst	TV series, episode "The Bounty Hunter"
1979	Saint Joan	Gilles de Rais (Bluebeard)	TV movie
1980	The Great Rock 'n' Roll Swindle	B.J.	
1982	Tales of the Unexpected	Robert Simpson	TV series, episode "Run, Rabbit, Run"
1982	Emmerdale Farm	Rev. Bill Jeffries	TV series, 12 episodes
1983	The Cleopatras	Grypus	TV miniseries, 2 episodes
1983	The Hunger	Ron	
1983	Forever Young	James	
1984	Mistral's Daughter	Chase Arnold	TV miniseries, 3 episodes
1985	The Last Place on Earth	Ernest Shackleton	TV miniseries, episode "Poles Apart"
1986	Lovejoy	Michael	TV series, episode "The March of Time"
1986	The American Way	Claude	
1986	Worlds Beyond	Philip Bradwell	TV series, episode "Voice from the Gallows"
1986	Lytton's Diary	The Editor	TV series, 3 episodes
1987	Shadow in a Landscape	Roderic O'Conor	TV movie
1987	Cry Freedom	2nd Passport Control officer	
1988	Ten Great Writers of the Modern World	Frank Budgen	TV miniseries, episode "James Joyce's 'Ulysses'"
1988	Thin Air	Zac Diamond	TV miniseries, 5 episodes
1988	Rockliffe's Folly	DI Derek Hoskins	TV series, 4 episodes
1989	Screen One	Colonel Mitchell	TV series, episode "The Mountain and the Molehill"
1989	Mission: Eureka	Swann	TV series
1990	The Rift	Contek 1	
1990	The Final Frame	Paul Mandell	TV movie
1990	TECX	Wolf	TV series, episode "Writing on the Wall"
1991	Buddy's Song	Adrian	
1991	Selling Hitler	Congo Randy	TV miniseries, episode "#1.1"
1991	A Demon in My View	Brian Kotowsky	
1991	The Men's Room	Steve Kirkwood	TV miniseries, 5 episodes
1992	Inspector Morse	Pathologist	TV series, episode "Absolute Conviction"
1992	The Barbara Vine Mysteries	Dr. Swiftson	TV series, episode "A Fatal Inversion: Part 1"
1992	Casualty	Hugo	TV series, episode "Will You Still Love Me?"
1993	V.I. Warshawski: BBC Radio Drama Collection	Martin Bledsoe (voice)	Radio series, episode "Deadlock"
1993	Full Stretch	Morris Legge	TV series, 3 episodes
1993	Harry	Prosecuting Counsel	TV series, episode "#1.6"
1995	The Choir	Alan Ashworth	TV miniseries, episode "#1.5"
1995	Brookside	Mr. Stewart	TV series, 4 episodes
1995–1999	The Bill	Dr. Fowler-West / Mr. Sutton	TV series, 2 episodes
1996	Silent Witness	D.I. Hartley	TV series, 2 episodes
1996	Circles of Deceit	George Grant	TV series, episode "Sleeping Dogs"
1997	The Apocalypse Watch	Winston Ross	TV movie
2001	The Cazalets	Raymond Castle	TV series, episode "#1.6"
2001	Spy Game	Mitch Alford	
2002	Heartbeat	Gordon Purvis	TV series, episode "Horses for Courses"
2005	Dalziel and Pascoe	Lord 'Tiger' Harper	TV series, episode "Dead Meat: Part 2"
2005	Doctors	James Evelyn	TV series, episode "A Rose for Delilah"
2005	The Government Inspector	David Chidgey	TV movie
2006	Brief Encounters	Harry	TV miniseries, episode "Lost & Found"

== Bibliography ==
- Holmstrom, John. The Moving Picture Boy: An International Encyclopaedia from 1895 to 1995. Norwich, Michael Russell, 1996, p. 267.
