= Harry Hook =

English screenwriter, director and photographer

- Born: 1960 (age 65–66); England
- Occupations: Film director, screenwriter

Harry Hook, born 1960, is an English screenwriter, film/television director and photographer. Hook is best known for such films as The Last of His Tribe and the 1990 version of Lord of the Flies.

== Career ==
Harry Hook's first feature film as writer/director, The Kitchen Toto, tells the story of Mwangi, a young Kikuyu boy, who works in the household of a white policeman during Kenya's struggle for independence.

Hook's other feature film credits include: Lord of the Flies, Columbia Pictures – an adaptation of William Golding's dystopian novel of boys stranded on a tropical island and their descent into savagery. The Last of His Tribe, HBO – starring Jon Voight and Graham Greene, tells the story of Ishi, the last survivor of the Yahi people, a tribe of Californian Indians. St. Ives – a love story set in the Napoleonic War, starring Jean Marc Barr, Miranda Richardson, Richard E Grant, Anna Friel and Jason Isaacs.

Hook's credits as a TV director embrace drama and documentary: The Many Lives of Albert Walker – a real life crime story; Silent Witness – a forensic science crime drama BBC series; The Tragedy of Rudyard Kipling; The Heart of Thomas Hardy and The Hidden Treasures of African Art. He also appeared as himself in an edition of the Forty Minutes documentary series, Home from the Hill, about his father, Hilary Hook, returning to the UK after living in Kenya. On the documentary series Greatest Cities of the World, Hook directed films on New York and Hong Kong. For ITV1, he has made People I Have Shot and Brothers in Arms.

=== Photography ===
In Photographing Africa, BBC4, Hook documents his own journey to East Africa in search of five nomadic women whose portraits he had made 30 years earlier.

The Royal Geographical Society awarded Hook the Cherry Kearton Medal for 2017 for ‘original documentation of Africa through photography’.

Hook's large photographic book ABOUT AFRICA, published in 2016, tells the visual story of Africa's migration from country to city over the course of more than 40 years.

== Filmography ==
- The Kitchen Toto (1987)
- Lord of the Flies (1990)
- The Last of His Tribe (1992)
- Silent Witness (1996 - 2 episodes)
- St. Ives (1998)
- The Many lives of Albert Walker (2002)
- Whiskey Echo (2005)
