= Sarah Barzyk =

Sarah Barzyk is a French actress, novelist, and film director.

== Filmography ==
=== Actress ===
- 1997 : Maître Da Costa (Le Doigt de Dieu) de Bob Swaim : Caroline (daughter of Christoph Waltz)
- 2000 : Tout est calme de Jean-Pierre Mocky : Camille
- 2007 : Le Deal de Jean-Pierre Mocky : Danielle
- 2007 : Éternelle de Didier Delaitre : Sophie Gir
- 2007 : Un Eléphant dans un magasin de Porcelaine : Myster Mocky présente by Jean-Pierre Mocky
- 2010 : Engrenages by Jean-Marc Brondolo : Julie
- 2011 : Le jour où tout a basculé (television series), episode Ma fille vend son corps : Noémie
- 2011 : Good Day Today de Arnold de Parscau : la sœur
- 2011 : Tommy d'Arnold de Parscau : La sœur
- 2011 : Ze Gift by Aurélia Martin
- 2011 : Aversion by Igor Cheloudiakoff : Lola
- 2012 : Le Jour où tout a basculé (television series) : Jenny (episode : Mon père est trop strict)
- 2012 : Shadows of a Stranger by Richard Dutton : Simone
- 2013 : Silver Factory by Simon Elephant
- 2013 : Nowhere's Paradis by Antoine Duret
- 2014 : Nina by Sarah Barzyk
- 2014 : Sur les Quais by William Crépin
- 2015 : Dans l'encre du Loup by Igor Déus
- 2016 : Dolorès de Sarah Barzyk
- 2017 : La Mort d'Olivier Bécaille by Yoann Boisson and Alexandre Mousset : Marguerite
- 2017 : Not quite Dead by Igor Déus
- 2017 : Héros/Psycho : Luna
- 2018 : Amentia by Giulia Fougeirol and Jean Guehl : Suzanne

=== Director ===
- 2014: Nina (short film) with Patricia Barzyk
- 2015: Marlowe (short film) with Jean-Pierre Mocky, Jacques Attali, Ludovic Berthillot
- 2016: Dolorès (music video) with Jean-Pierre Mocky
