= Lord of the Flies (1990 film) =

1990 film by Harry Hook

- Theatrical release poster
- Directed by: Harry Hook
- Screenplay by: Sara Schiff
- Based on: Lord of the Flies; 1954 novel by William Golding
- Produced by: Lewis M. Allen
- Starring: Balthazar Getty; Chris Furrh; Danuel Pipoly; James Badge Dale; Andrew Taft; Edward Taft
- Cinematography: Martin Fuhrer
- Edited by: Harry Hook
- Music by: Philippe Sarde; Igor Stravinsky
- Production companies: Castle Rock Entertainment; Nelson Entertainment
- Distributed by: Columbia Pictures
- Release date: March 16, 1990
- Running time: 90 minutes
- Country: United States
- Language: English
- Budget: $9 million
- Box office: $13 million

Lord of the Flies is a 1990 American survival drama film directed by Harry Hook from a screenplay by Jay Presson Allen under the pseudonym "Sara Schiff", based on the 1954 book by William Golding. It stars Balthazar Getty, Chris Furrh, Danuel Pipoly, and James Badge Dale. It is the third film adaptation of the book, following Lord of the Flies (1963) and Alkitrang Dugo (1975).

Lord of the Flies was released on March 16, 1990, by Columbia Pictures. Upon and since its release, the film has received mixed reviews, generally more negative than its 1963 counterpart. Most critics praised the film's performances and scenery but centered upon the film's deviations from the novel as a central flaw. It was also a box-office bomb, grossing $13 million domestically.

== Plot ==
An aircraft carrying 24 American military school cadet boys returning home ditches near an uninhabited jungle island in the Pacific Ocean. Captain Benson, the pilot of the plane and the only adult survivor, is seriously injured and delirious. During the night, Simon, the most independent cadet, finds a river and notifies the other boys, which they all drink from and explore the island afterwards. Meanwhile, on the beach, an overweight cadet nicknamed "Piggy", finds a conch seashell and takes it to the grouped cadets, who adopt it to signal the right to speak and be heard by the group. The senior cadet, Cadet Colonel Ralph, organizes a meeting to discuss surviving their predicament. Ralph and another of the older boys, Jack, emerge dominant; in an impromptu vote Ralph is elected the group's official leader. They start a fire using Piggy's glasses to try and alert any passing craft. Things go smoothly for a while, but tensions soon begin to grow between Ralph and Jack.

One night, as they sleep, Jack brings all of his hunters to hunt in the jungle, leaving no one watching the fire. The fire goes out, preventing a passing helicopter from noticing them. Ralph confronts Jack for failing to keep it going. During the ensuing fight, Jack, tired of listening to Ralph and Piggy, leaves and forms his own camp, taking many of the boys with him. As more and more boys defect to Jack's side, Captain Benson goes feral and hides in a cave. Several boys mistake him for a monster in the cave's darkness.

One night, Jack and his savages steal the group's survival knife. Piggy's glasses are trampled in the commotion, breaking one lens. Expecting to be rescued, Ralph and his followers establish a permanent signal-fire to alert passing ships of their presence on the island. Not expecting or wanting to be rescued, Jack's savage leadership adapts to circumstance; he establishes his camp as spear-bearing hunters who provide meat for both camps. They kill a wild pig and leave its head as an offering to the "monster" that they believe is in the cave. Eventually, identical twins Sam and Eric, two of Ralph's friends, leave him to join Jack's tribe, leaving Ralph with only Piggy and Simon left.

Meanwhile, Simon finds the pig's head on the stick. He then uses a glow stick to explore the cave and discovers the corpse of Captain Benson. Simon realizes the boys mistook Captain Benson for a monster and runs to the beach in an attempt to alert them of his discovery, but his waving of the glow stick frightens the other boys, who mistake him for the monster and stab him to death with their spears. The following morning, Ralph blames himself and Piggy for not stopping the hunters from killing Simon. Afterwards, Jack tells his gang that the "monster" can come in any different form.

Jack and the savages raid Ralph's camp and steal Piggy's glasses. Piggy and Ralph travel to Jack's camp at Castle Rock, attempting to call a meeting using the conch. Piggy insists that everyone be sensible and work together, but Jack's savages refuse to listen. As Piggy speaks, Roger pushes a boulder off a cliff which falls on Piggy's head, killing him instantly. Ralph swears revenge, but Jack and his hunters drive Ralph away by throwing rocks at him. Later that night, Ralph secretly returns to Castle Rock to visit Sam and Eric, who warn him that the hunters will chase after Ralph on Jack's orders.

The following morning, Jack and his hunters begin setting the jungle on fire to force Ralph out of hiding and kill him. Just barely dodging the spreading fire and Jack's hunters, Ralph makes a desperate run to the sea. He falls onto the beach where he encounters a U.S. Marine Corps officer as the hunters stop. The officer asks "What are you guys doing?". A horrified Jack and his hunters watch in stunned silence and reflect upon their savage behavior, while Ralph breaks into tears. More military helicopters arrive on the island after having seen the fire.

== Cast ==
- Balthazar Getty as Ralph
- Chris Furrh as Jack
- Danuel Pipoly as Piggy
- James Badge Dale as Simon
- Andrew Taft as Sam
- Edward Taft as Eric
- Gary Rule as Roger
- Braden MacDonald as Larry
- Michael Greene as Captain Benson
- Bob Peck as U.S. Marine Corps Officer
- Brian Matthews as Tony

== Production ==
The filming was done on location at Portland Parish in Jamaica, particularly at Snow Hill and Frenchman's Cove, in the summer of 1988. Additional filming locations included Hamakua Coast; Kaua'i; Hana, Maui (in Hawaii) and the Los Angeles County Arboretum and Botanic Garden. Harry Hook stated he selected Jamaica as the filming location because "it offered us the vegetation and long days of light that we required. Everyone was very, very helpful to us. I would definitely go back again."

For a sequence filmed on the Hamakua Coast, it was determined that the child actors were too short to film shots where they needed to walk through long grass, so taller body doubles were instead used to film this sequence. A casting call was sent to find the body doubles, and they were all cast within forty-eight hours. Two weeks into filming, the production was disrupted by Hurricane Gilbert, which could not be ignored due to the wind blowing leaves off of the trees. In order to match with what had already been shot, a storm was written into the script, and the crew brought in wind generators to create the appearance of a storm.

The child members cast were relatively inexperienced. Balthazar Getty (Ralph) and James Badge Dale (Simon) were the only child actors who went on to have successful acting careers, as with James Aubrey, who played Ralph, and Nicholas Hammond, who played Robert, in the film version of 1963.

=== Screenplay ===
The screenplay was written by producer Lewis M. Allen's wife, Jay Presson Allen, her last film work before her death in 2006. She was reportedly dissatisfied by the final product and had her name removed and had the screenplay credited to the pseudonym Sara Schiff.

The trick in adapting, Allen said in a 1982 interview with The New York Times, "is not to throw out the baby with the bath water. You can change all kinds of things, but don't muck around with the essence".

== Soundtrack ==
The film score borrows heavily from the seminal classical composition Le Sacre du Printemps (The Rite of Spring) by Igor Stravinsky.

Lord of the Flies (Original Motion Picture Soundtrack)

Film score by Philippe Sarde
- Released: 1990
- Genre: Soundtrack
- Length: 36:30
- Label: Silva Screen

Lord of the Flies (Original Motion Picture Soundtrack)
No.	Title	Length
1.	"Lord Of The Flies"	3:49
2.	"The Island"	3:20
3.	"Demons"	3:03
4.	"Fire On The Mountain"	2:49
5.	"Cry Of The Hunters"	5:17
6.	"Last Hope"	1:03
7.	"Savages"	4:02
8.	"After The Storm"	6:12
9.	"Bacchanalia"	3:31
10.	"Lord Of The Flies - Finale"	3:24
Total length:		36:30

== Release ==
=== Box office ===
Lord of the Flies was released theatrically on March 16, 1990, in the United States by Columbia Pictures. Upon release, the film made $4.4 million in 888 theaters. It debuted at No.3 behind The Hunt for Red October and Joe Versus the Volcano. The film closed from theaters with a complete domestic gross of $13.9 million.

=== Critical reception ===
Lord of the Flies received mixed reviews from critics, providing mixed assessments of the performances of the various actors while praising its scenery. The review aggregator Rotten Tomatoes reported that 55% of critics have given the film a positive review based on 22 reviews, with an average rating of 6.40/10. On Metacritic, the film has a weighted average score of 49 out of 100 based on 20 critic reviews, indicating "mixed or average" reviews. Audiences polled by CinemaScore gave the film an average grade of "B−" on an A+ to F scale.

Most heavily criticized was the way in which the filmmakers departed from the novel. Richard Alleva of Crisis magazine criticized the portrayal of the first assembly on the island, a crucial moment in the book, as "anticlimactic" in the film. He lamented the fact that the conversation that Simon imagines taking place between himself and the pig, or the "Lord of the Flies", yet another of the book's most pivotal moments, was in the movie reduced to only a few moments of Simon staring at the pig. Alleva also criticized what he saw as misrepresentations of Ralph and Jack, believing that the movie downplayed Ralph's imperfections as presented in the book and amplified those of Jack. He said that "In this film, the good boys are too good; the bad boys too quickly bad, and bad in the wrong way."

Roger Ebert remarked in his review that "the story is less poignant nowadays than it once was, if only because events take place every day on our mean streets that are more horrifying than anything the little monsters do to one another on Golding's island."

PopMatters journalist J.C. Maçek III wrote favorably about the performances of the movie's central actors but commented that "[t]he lessons and allusions of the novel and first adaptation feel heavy-handed and far too obvious in this remake. In short, while the 1963 film, in its black and white darkness, brings the viewer into the film with depth and shock, the 1990 movie is the experience of watching actors reciting lines and making a movie."

Barrie Maxwell of DVD Verdict commented that the color of the island creates a more superficial atmosphere than the stark black and white of the previous version.

Janet Maslin of the New York Times wrote the following in a 1990 review:

As directed by Harry Hook, the new Lord of the Flies offers much spectacle for the eye and almost nothing to keep the mind from wandering. Mr. Hook and the cinematographer Martin Fuhrer may be able to work orange flames, turquoise ocean and lush tropical foliage into a single pretty (if nonsensical) frame. But they can't get a toehold onto what Mr. Golding called his "attempt to trace the defects of society back to the defects of human nature."

Lord of the Flies contrasts with the real case of Tongan castaways who cooperated for 15 months.
