= The Write Environment =

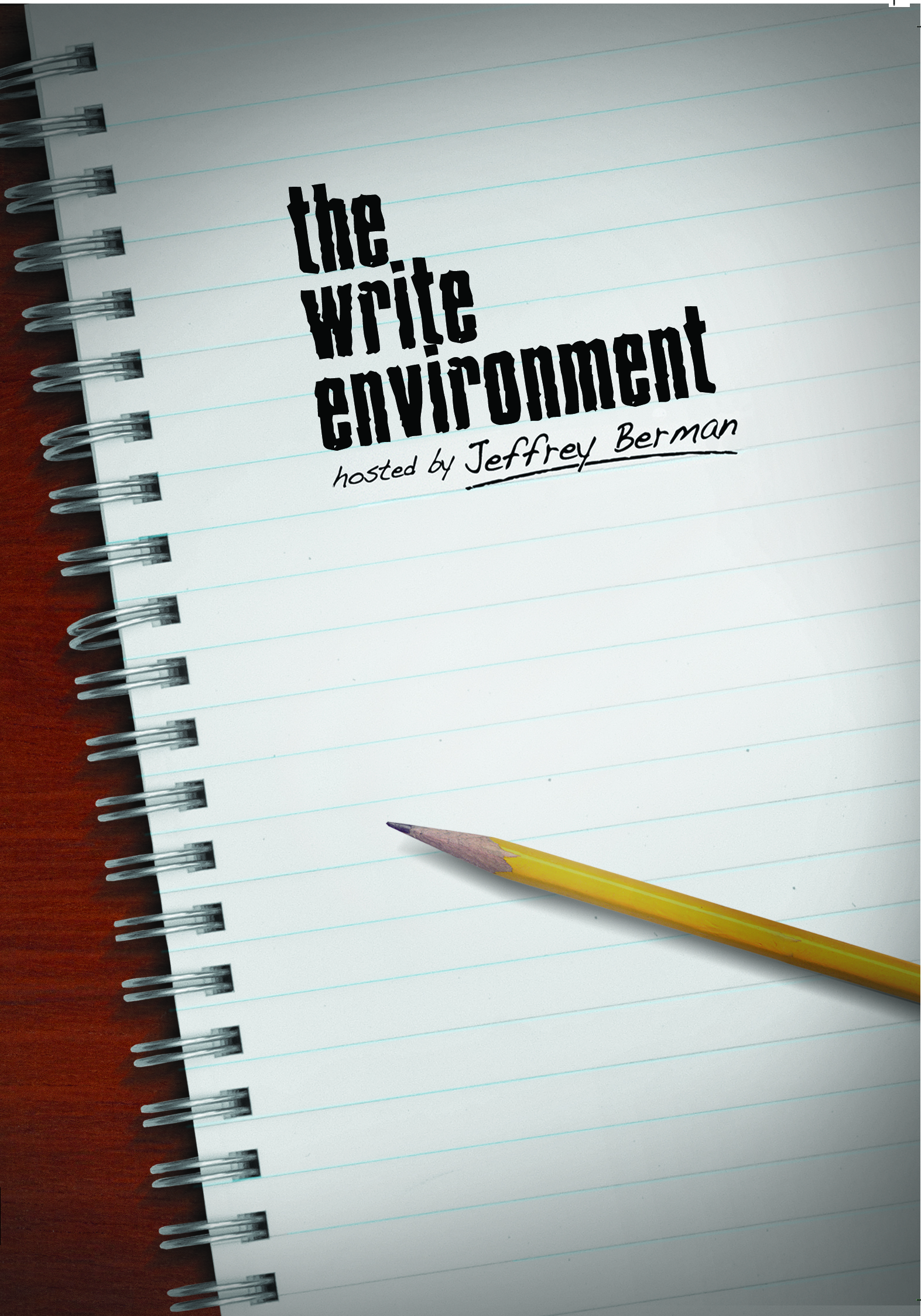
- The Write Environment logo
- Created by: Jeffrey Berman
- Starring: Jeffrey Berman
- Country of origin: United States

Production
- Running time: 60 minutes

Original release
- Network: KCET
- Release: November 2008 – 2008

The Write Environment is a documentary series hosted by Jeffrey Berman. It is produced by Amy Gollnick; the executive producer is Jeffrey Berman. The series, which premiered in November 2008, is produced and distributed by RDRR Productions.

== About the program ==
The series goes behind the scenes into the world of screenwriting and screenwriters: their inspirations and their creative processes.

== Guests ==
- Joss Whedon
- Damon Lindelof
- Tim Kring
- Sam Simon
- Philip Rosenthal
- Doug Ellin
- Tim Minear
- Robert Hewitt Wolfe
- David Hayter
- Jay Kogen
- Marv Wolfman
- Mark Waid
- Geoff Johns

== Additional Sources ==
- An Hour With Joss January 1, 2009
- Enter The Write Environment November 2008
- Write On! Online, The Write Environment Query Contest May 2009
