= Lord of the Flies (1963 film) =

1963 British film by Peter Brook

- Theatrical release poster
- Directed by: Peter Brook
- Based on: Lord of the Flies; 1954 novel by William Golding
- Produced by: Lewis M. Allen
- Starring: James Aubrey; Tom Chapin; Hugh Edwards; Tom Gaman; David Surtees; Simon Surtees; Nicholas Hammond
- Cinematography: Thomas Hollyman
- Edited by: Peter Brook; Gerald Feil; Jean-Claude Lubtchansky
- Music by: Raymond Leppard
- Production companies: Lord of the Flies Company; Allen-Hodgdon Productions; Two Arts
- Distributed by: British Lion Film Corporation
- Release dates: 12 May 1963 (Cannes); 23 July 1964 (United Kingdom)
- Running time: 92 minutes
- Country: United Kingdom
- Language: English
- Budget: $250,000 (£80,000)

Lord of the Flies is a 1963 British survival drama film written for the screen and directed by Peter Brook, based on the 1954 novel by William Golding. It follows 30 schoolboys who are marooned on an island where the behaviour of the majority degenerates into savagery.

The film was in production for much of 1961, though the film did not premiere until 1963, and was not released in the United Kingdom until 1964. Golding himself supported the film. When Kenneth Tynan was a script editor for Ealing Studios he commissioned a script of Lord of the Flies from Nigel Kneale, but Ealing Studios closed in 1959 before it could be produced.

The film premiered at the 1963 Cannes Film Festival, where it was nominated for the Palme d'Or. It was released in the UK by British Lion Films on July 23, 1964, and received positive reviews from critics. It was the first film adaptation of the novel, followed by a 1975 Filipino film and a 1990 American film.

== Plot ==
In the prologue, told through photographs, a group of schoolboys are evacuated from England following the outbreak of an unidentified war. Their aircraft is shot down by a briefly-glimpsed fighter plane and ditches near a remote island.

The main character, Ralph, is seen walking through a tropical forest. He meets a chubby, bespectacled boy who reveals his derisive school nickname was Piggy but asks that Ralph not repeat that. The two go to the beach where they find a conch seashell, which Ralph blows to rally the other survivors. As they emerge from the jungle, it becomes clear that no adults have escaped the crash. Singing is then heard and a small column of school choirboys, wearing dark cloaks and hats and led by a boy named Jack Merridew, walk towards the other survivors.

The boys decide to appoint a chief. The vote goes to Ralph, not Jack. Initially, Ralph is able to steer the boys (all of whom are aged between about six and fourteen) towards a reasonably civilised and co-operative society. The choirboys make wooden spears, creating the appearance that they are warriors within the group. Crucially, Jack has a knife. Ralph, Jack, and a choirboy named Simon go off to explore, find out they are indeed on a deserted island and that there are wild pigs on the island. The boys have another assembly where Ralph tells the boys to make a fire.

The boys build shelters and start a signal fire using Piggy's spectacles. With no rescue in sight, the increasingly authoritarian and violence-prone Jack starts hunting and eventually finds a pig, which they hunt. Meanwhile, the fire, for which he and his "hunters" are responsible, goes out, losing the boys' chance of being spotted from a passing aeroplane. Piggy chastises Jack, and Jack strikes him in retaliation, knocking his glasses off and breaking one lens. Ralph is furious with Jack. Soon some of the boys begin to talk of a "beast" that comes from the water. The next day, twins Sam and Eric, see something on the mountain and they tell the boys it's another beast. All the boys except Piggy and the littluns go searching for it. Ralph, Jack and another boy named Roger continue on to the top of the mountain and see something move. The boys run away. The next day, Jack, obsessed with this imagined threat and tired of listening to Ralph, leaves the group to start a new tribe, one without rules, where the boys paint their faces, play and hunt all day. Soon, more follow until only a few, including Piggy, Sam and Eric, are left with Ralph.

Events reach a crisis when Simon finds a sow's head impaled on a stick, left by Jack as an offering to the beast. He becomes hypnotised by the head, which has flies swarming all around it. Simon then climbs the mountain and sees that what the other boys thought was a beast is actually the dead body of a parachutist. Simon runs down in an attempt to tell the others the truth but the frenzied boys, in the darkness, mistaking him for the beast; stab and beat him to death. Grieving over Simon's death, Ralph blames himself for not stopping the hunters for killing Simon but Piggy confronts him and convinces him that it was an accident. Piggy also defends the group's actions with a series of rationalizations and denials. Later on, the hunters raid the old group's camp and steal Piggy's glasses. Ralph goes to talk to the new group at their fortress, Castle Rock, using the still-present power of the conch to get their attention. However Jack refuses to listen. When Piggy takes the conch, they are not silent (as their rules require) but instead jeer. Roger dislodges a boulder from a cliff which falls on Piggy, killing him and crushing the conch. Piggy's body falls into the ocean and he floats face down.

Ralph runs and hides in the jungle, later returning to visit Sam and Eric, who've been forced to join Jack's tribe by Roger. They warn him that Jack plans to hunt him down and kill him. The next morning, Jack and his hunters set fires to try and smoke him out. Ralph staggers across the smoke-covered island while the chant "kill the pig" draws closer. Stumbling onto the beach, Ralph falls at the feet of a Royal Navy officer and landing party from HMS Troubridge, who stare at the painted and spear-carrying savages that the boys have become. One of the youngest boys, Percival, approaches the officer in stunned disbelief. Ralph weeps as flames spread across the island.

== Cast ==
- James Aubrey as Ralph
- Tom Chapin as Jack
- Hugh Edwards as Piggy
- Roger Elwin as Roger
- Tom Gaman as Simon
- David Surtees as Sam
- Simon Surtees as Eric
- Nicholas Hammond as Robert
- Roger Allan as Piers
- Kent Fletcher as Percival
- Richard Horne as Lance
- Timothy Horne as Leslie
- Andrew Horne as Matthew
- Peter Davy as Peter
- David Brunjes as Donald
- Christopher Harris as Bill
- Alan Heaps as Neville
- Jonathan Heaps as Howard
- Burnes Hollyman as Douglas
- Peter Ksiezopolski as Francis
- Anthony McCall-Judson as Maurice
- Malcolm Rodker as Harold
- David St. Clair as George
- Rene Sanfiorenzo Jr. as Charles
- Jeremy Scuse as Rowland
- John Stableford as Digby
- Nicholas Valkenburg as Rupert
- Patrick Valkenburg as Robin
- Edward Valencia as Frederick
- David Walsh as Percy
- John Walsh as Michael
- Jeremy Willis as Henry

== Analysis ==
As with Golding's book, the pessimistic theme of the film is that fear, hate and violence are inherent in the human condition – even when innocent children are placed in seemingly idyllic isolation. The realisation of this is seen as being the cause of Ralph's distress in the closing shots.

Charles Silver, curator in the Department of Film at MoMA, wrote that the film is "about anarchy and how that thin veneer we wear of what we refer to as 'civilization' is threatened by the attractive clarion call of bestiality and its accompanying hatred".

Lord of the Flies contrasts with the real case of Tongan castaways who thrived for over a year in cooperative harmony.

== Production ==
=== Casting and filming ===
The parents of the boys chosen as actors were reported to have been provided copies of the novel, from which a commentary had been physically removed; those pages included describing the culmination of the hunt of a wild sow as an "Oedipal wedding night". Brook noted that "time was short; we were lent the children by unexpectedly eager parents just for the duration of the summer holidays".

The film was shot entirely in Puerto Rico at Aguadilla, El Yunque and on the island of Vieques. The boys in the cast were all non-professional, had mostly not read the book, and actual scripting was minimal; scenes were filmed by explaining them to the boys, who then acted them out, with most of the dialogue improvised. As such, the movie does not have a screenplay credit. For many of the cast, Lord of the Flies was their only film appearance. Two notable exceptions were James Aubrey (Ralph) and Nicholas Hammond (Robert), who both had sizable acting careers in adulthood.

Life magazine journalist Robert Wallace visited the cast in Puerto Rico and observed one of them amusing himself by feeding live lizards into the blades of a rotating fan. Wallace commented: "One could almost hear William Golding, 4,000 miles away in England, chuckling into his beard."

Tom Gaman, who played Simon in Brook's film, remembered that "although I didn't think much about it at the time, in hindsight my death scene scares me. It was night, the spears – those wooden stakes – were quite real. We were excited, brandishing flaming sticks around a bonfire on the beach in a real storm. I really did emerge from the bushes into the centre of a raging crowd, screamed in terror, was stabbed by boys with sharpened sticks, and staggered to the water."

=== Post-production ===
The 60 hours of film from the 1961 shoot was edited down to 4 hours, according to editor Gerald Feil. This was further edited to a 100-minute feature that was shown at the 1963 Cannes Film Festival (9 to 22 May), but the cuts necessitated that new audio transitions and some dialog changes be dubbed into the film more than a year after shooting. The voice of James Aubrey, who played Ralph, had dropped three octaves and was electronically manipulated to better approximate his earlier voice, but it is still significantly different. Tom Chapin, who played Jack, had lost his English accent and another boy's voice was used to dub his parts. The U.S. distributor insisted the film be further edited to 90 minutes, so one fire scene and scenes developing the character of Ralph were cut.

== Song ==
The song, heard throughout the film, of the boys singing is Kyrie Eleison which, translated from Greek, means "Lord, have mercy". It is an expression used in a prayer of the Christian liturgy.

== Reception ==
=== Critical response ===
Rotten Tomatoes reported that 91% of critics have given the film a positive review based on 22 reviews, with an average rating of 8.19/10. On Metacritic, the film has a weighted average score of 67 out of 100 based on 9 critic reviews, indicating "generally favourable reviews".

PopMatters journalist J.C. Maçek III wrote "The true surprise in Lord of the Flies is how little these child actors actually feel like 'child actors'. With few exceptions, the acting rarely seems to be forced or flat. This practised, well-honed craft aids Brook's vision of a fly on the wall approach that pulls the viewer into each scene."

Bosley Crowther wrote in The New York Times that "the picture made from it by the writer-director Peter Brook is a curiously flat and fragmentary visualization of the original. It is loosely and jerkily constructed, in its first and middle phases, at least, and it has a strangely perfunctory, almost listless flow of narrative in most of its scenes".

=== Accolades ===
Peter Brook was nominated for the Golden Palm at the 1963 Cannes Film Festival.

The film was named one of the Top Ten Films of the year in 1963 by the National Board of Review.

== Cast reunion ==
In 1996, Peter Brook organised a reunion for the cast members for a documentary film titled Time Flies. Brook was "curious to know what the years had done to his cast, and what effect the isolated months of filming had had on their lives". Although none seemed damaged by their time working on the film, Simon Surtees, one of a pair of twin brothers who played Sam and Eric, "put his finger unerringly on the ethical dilemma. 'The problem is that most of us are not trained artists, so I now believe Peter runs the risk of abandoning us to our fate, just as he did in 1961, when he plucked us from our schools and our homes, put us on the island, then cast us back to live our lives as if nothing would ever change.'"

== Home media ==
The Criterion Collection released it on DVD and Blu-ray Disc in the United States and Canada. In 2000 Janus Films also released the DVD in the UK.

== See also ==
- Survival film, about the film genre, with a list of related films
