= Alkitrang Dugo =

1975 Filipino film

- Film cover
- Directed by: Lupita A. Concio
- Written by: Nicanor B. Cleto Jr.
- Based on: Lord of the Flies by Sir William Golding
- Produced by: Nora Villamayor
- Starring: Eddie Villamayor; Roderick Paulate
- Cinematography: Joe Batac Jr.
- Edited by: Ben Barcelon
- Music by: Lutgardo Labad
- Production company: NV Productions
- Release dates: October 5, 1975; January 22, 1977 (Davao)
- Running time: 107 minutes
- Country: Philippines
- Language: Filipino

Alkitrang Dugo is a 1975 Filipino survival drama film directed by Lupita A. Concio. The story and screenplay written by Nicanor B. Cleto Jr. was based on the 1954 novel Lord of the Flies by British novelist Sir William Golding.

== Plot ==
A group of young Filipino athletes find themselves stranded on an uninhabited island after their plane crashes, claiming the lives of both their pilot and coach. Luis organizes the group and appoints himself leader. They find fresh water and gather coconuts. They then tried to build a shelter and tried to start a fire to keep warm and alert passing ships of their whereabouts, but Andy wants to stay on this island forever, because he is more interested in playing Indians and hunting wild game, and it soon becomes evident that he is unhappy with Luis's leadership. Andy challenges Luis to a proper vote, resulting in a division amongst the group, half in favor of Andy and half in favor of Luis. What follows is a rapid decline into all out war between the two groups.

== Cast ==
- Roderick Paulate as Andy
- Eddie Villamayor as Luis
- Toto Jr. as Nilo
- Margie Braza as Clarita
- Jingle as Glenda
- Angelito as Ricky
- Efren Montes as Brooks
- Zernan Manahan as Lando
- Rinna Peredo as Velvy
- Michael Sandico as Angelo
- Ricky Sandico as Biko

== Differences between the book and the film ==
- The film depicts boys and girls stranded on the island together, while in the book there were only boys.
- In the book, the children elect a leader shortly after being stranded on the island; in the film, the election does not take place until they have already been on the island for several weeks.

== Location ==
The movie was set on location at Lipata, Padre Burgos, Quezon.

== Awards and nominations ==
Award-Giving Body	Category	Recipient	Result
1st Gawad Urian Awards
1st Gawad Urian Awards	Best Music (Pinakamahusay na Musika)	Lutgardo Labad	Nominated
1st Gawad Urian Awards	Best Editing (Pinakamahusay na Editing)	Ben Barcelon	Nominated
1st Gawad Urian Awards	Best Sound (Pinakamahusay na Tunog)	Willie de Santos	Nominated
