= Danuel Pipoly =

American actor

- Born: Danuel Pipoly; 11 March 1978 (age 48); Los Angeles County, California, USA
- Years active: 1988–1995

Danuel Pipoly (born 11 March 1978) is an American former actor, most famous for starring as Piggy in the 1990 film adaptation of Lord of the Flies. He received two award nominations as a result of his work with Lord of the Flies, including one for best young supporting actor.

== Personal life ==
Pipoly graduated from Crescenta Valley High School in 1996. In 2005 he was single and lived in La Crescenta, California. He attended Moffitt Elementary School in Norwalk, Ca.

== Filmography ==
Year	Film	Role	Notes
1990	Downtown	Skip Markowitz	
1990	Lord of the Flies	Piggy	
1991	The Torkelsons	Benvolio	
1992	The Giant of Thunder Mountain	Zeke MacGruder	
1995	3 Ninjas Knuckle Up	Kid #3	

== Awards and nominations ==
Year	Award	Result	Category	Film
1991	Young Artist Award	Nominated	Best Young Actor Supporting Role in a Motion Picture	Lord of the Flies
1991	Young Artist Award	Nominated	Outstanding Young Ensemble Cast in a Motion Picture for	Lord of the Flies
