= Lord of the Flies =

1954 novel by William Golding

- The original UK Lord of the Flies book cover
- Author: William Golding
- Cover artist: Anthony Gross
- Genre: Allegorical novel
- Publisher: Faber and Faber
- Publication date: 17 September 1954
- Publication place: United Kingdom
- Pages: 224
- OCLC: 47677622

Lord of the Flies is the 1954 debut novel of British author William Golding. The plot concerns a group of prepubescent British boys who are stranded on an uninhabited island and their disastrous attempts to govern themselves that lead to a descent into savagery. The novel's themes include morality, leadership, and the tension between civility and chaos.

Lord of the Flies was generally well received and is a popularly assigned book in schools.

== Background ==
Published in 1954, Lord of the Flies was Golding's first novel. Golding got the idea for the plot from The Coral Island, a children's adventure novel with a focus on Christianity and the supposed civilising influence of British colonialism. Golding thought that the book was unrealistic and asked his wife whether it would be a good idea if he "wrote a book about children on an island, children who behave in the way children really would behave?"

Golding, who was a philosophy teacher before becoming a Royal Navy lieutenant, experienced war firsthand and commanded a landing craft in the Normandy landings during D-Day in 1944. After the war ended and Golding returned to England, the world was dominated by the Cold War and the threat of nuclear annihilation, which led Golding to examine the nature of humanity and that went on to inspire Lord of the Flies.

The novel was rejected by many publishers before being accepted by Faber & Faber. An initial rejection labelled the book as "absurd... Rubbish & dull". The draft of the book was titled Strangers from Within, which was considered "too abstract and too explicit". Eventually Golding chose Lord of the Flies as the title. The title is a literal translation of Beelzebub, a biblical demon considered the god of pride and warfare.

Editor Charles Monteith worked with Golding on several major edits, including removing the entire first section that described an evacuation from nuclear war. The character of Simon also was heavily edited to remove an interaction with a mysterious figure who is implied to be a god. Ultimately, Golding accepted the edits, and wrote that "I've lost any kind of objectivity I ever had over this novel and can hardly bear to look at it". The edited manuscripts are available to view at the University of Exeter library.

== Plot ==
In the midst of a wartime evacuation, a British aeroplane crashes on an isolated island. The only survivors are boys in their middle childhood or preadolescence. A fair-haired boy named Ralph meets a pudgy boy named Piggy. They find a conch shell, which Ralph uses as a horn to gather the survivors. Ralph immediately commands authority over the other surviving boys using the conch, and is elected their "chief". He establishes three goals for the boys: to have fun, to survive, and to constantly maintain a smoke signal that could alert passing ships. Ralph, a red-haired boy named Jack, and a quiet boy named Simon use Piggy's glasses to create a signal fire.

The semblance of order among them deteriorates as the boys grow lazy and ignore Ralph's efforts to improve life on the island. They become paranoid about an imaginary monster called "the beast". Ralph fails to convince the boys that no beast exists, while Jack gains popularity by declaring that he will personally hunt and kill the monster. At one point, Jack takes the boys to hunt a wild pig, including the boys who were meant to watch the signal fire. The smoke signal goes out, failing to attract a ship that was passing by the island. Ralph angrily confronts Jack and considers relinquishing his role as leader, but is persuaded not to do so by Piggy.

One night, an air battle occurs near the island and the body of a fighter pilot drifts down in a parachute. Twin boys Sam and Eric mistake the corpse for the beast. When Ralph and Jack investigate with another boy, Roger, they flee in terror, believing the imaginary beast is real. Jack tries to turn the others against Ralph, and goes off alone to form his own tribe, with most of the other boys gradually joining him. Jack and his followers set up an offering to the beast in the forest: a pig's head, mounted on a sharpened stick and swarming with flies. Simon, who often ventures into the forest alone, has an imaginary dialogue with the head that he dubs the "Lord of the Flies". The head tells Simon that there is no beast on the island, implies that the beast is actually within the boys themselves and predicts that the others will turn on Simon. That night, Ralph and Piggy visit Jack's tribe, who have begun painting their faces and engaging in primitive ritual dances. When Simon realises that the beast is only a dead pilot, he rushes to tell Jack's tribe, but the frenzied boys, including Ralph and Piggy, mistake Simon for the beast and beat him to death. Ralph and Piggy tell themselves the death was not their responsibility and let Simon's body be carried away by the sea.

Jack and his tribe steal Piggy's glasses in the middle of the night. Ralph goes to Jack's camp with Piggy, Sam, and Eric to confront Jack and retrieve the glasses. Roger drops a boulder, killing Piggy and smashing the conch. Ralph manages to escape, but Sam and Eric are taken hostage. That night, Ralph secretly confronts Sam and Eric. Sam and Eric warn him about Jack's plans to hunt him, and Ralph tells them about his planned hiding spot.

The next morning, Jack's tribe sets fire to the forest. Ralph narrowly escapes the boys and the fire, and while fleeing, falls down in front of a uniformed adult – a British naval officer who has landed on the island to investigate the smoke. Ralph, Jack, and the remaining boys erupt into sobs over the "end of innocence". The officer then expresses his disappointment at seeing the boys exhibiting such feral, warlike behaviour, then turns, embarrassed and moved, to stare at his cruiser waiting offshore.

== Characters ==
=== Primary ===
- Ralph: The athletic and charismatic protagonist who becomes the elected leader of the surviving boys. He is often representative of order, civilisation, and productive leadership. At the beginning of the novel, Ralph sets out to build huts and thinks of ways to improve their chances of being rescued. Ralph's influence over the boys is at first secure, but it declines as the boys defect to Jack and turn to savagery.
- Jack Merridew: The strong-willed antagonist who represents savagery, violence, and power. He was the leader of the choir at his school. At the beginning of the novel, he is infuriated at losing the leadership election to Ralph. He then leads his tribe, consisting of a group of ex-choir boys, into the deep forest where they hunt pigs and turn into barbarians with painted faces. By the end of the novel, he uses the boys' fear of the imaginary beast to assert control over them.
- "Piggy": Ralph's intellectual and talkative friend who helps Ralph to become leader and is the source of many innovative ideas. He represents the rational side of humanity. Piggy's asthma, weight, and poor eyesight make him a target of scorn and violence. His real name is not given.
- Simon: An innately spiritual boy who is often the voice of reason in the midst of the rivalry between Ralph and Jack.
- Roger: An initially quiet boy who eventually shows his love for violence when Jack rises to power. He is responsible for the death of Piggy.

=== Secondary ===
- Sam and Eric: Twins, who are among Ralph's few supporters at the end of the novel. Roger forces them to join Jack's tribe.
- The officer: An unnamed British naval officer who commands a landing party arriving on the island at the end of the novel. The sudden appearance of an adult authority figure leads the children to instantly revert to their true age and status. However, apparently unaware of any irony, he stares at his own warship while expressing disappointment at the descent into violence by the stranded boys.

== Themes ==
The novel's major themes are morality, civility, leadership, and the potential for rapid degeneration into chaos in society that all explore the duality of human nature.

Lord of the Flies portrays a scenario in which privileged British children quickly descend into chaos and violence without adult authority, despite attempts by some of them to establish order and co-ordination. This subverts the colonial narratives found in many British books of this period; for example, The Coral Island. Lord of the Flies contains various references to The Coral Island; for example, the rescuing naval officer describing the misadventures of the boys as a "jolly good show. Like the Coral Island." Golding's three central characters, Ralph, Piggy, and Jack, can also be interpreted as caricatures of the protagonists in The Coral Island.

At an allegorical level, a central theme is how the desire for civilisation conflicts with the desire for power. Lord of the Flies also portrays the tension between groupthink and individuality, between rational and emotional reactions, and between morality and immorality. These themes have been explored in an essay by American literary critic Harold Bloom.

The novel also examines aspects of war, as the story is set during a war that has begun before the boys arrive on the island. Although the location of the island is never stated, it is sometimes thought to be somewhere in the Pacific Ocean, but John Sutherland argues that a coral island in the Indian Ocean is intended, based on remarks by Jack that the plane had stopped off in "Gib" (Gibraltar) and "Addis" (Addis Ababa), presumably en route to a refuge in Western Australia. In fact, an early manuscript, titled Strangers From Within, explicitly placed the island near New Guinea and Borneo.

=== Genre and style ===
As a tale of adventure and survival, Lord of the Flies fits the genre of allegorical fiction. It also questions human morality, making it a work of philosophical fiction. The novel is styled as allegorical fiction, embodying the concepts of inherent human savagery, mob mentality, and totalitarian leadership. However, Golding deviates from typical allegory in that both the protagonists and the antagonists are fully developed, realistic characters.

== Reception ==
=== Critical response ===
Its first print run of 3,000 copies was slow to sell, but Lord of the Flies went on to become very popular, with more than ten million copies sold as of 2015. E. M. Forster chose Lord of the Flies as his "outstanding novel of the year". It was described in one review as "not only a first-rate adventure but a parable of our times". In February 1960, Floyd C. Gale of Galaxy Science Fiction rated Lord of the Flies five stars out of five, stating, "Golding paints a truly terrifying picture of the decay of a minuscule society... Well on its way to becoming a modern classic".

Marc D. Hauser called Lord of the Flies "riveting" and said that it "should be standard reading in biology, economics, psychology, and philosophy".

Lord of the Flies presents a view of humanity unimaginable before the horrors of Nazi Europe, and then plunges into speculations about mankind in the state of nature. Bleak and specific, but universal, fusing rage and grief, Lord of the Flies is both a novel of the 1950s, and for all time.

— Robert McCrum, The Guardian.

Lord of the Flies was included on the American Library Association list of the 100 most frequently challenged books of 1990–1999, for its controversial stance on human nature and individual welfare versus the common good.

The book has been criticised as cynical for portraying humanity as inherently selfish and violent. It has been linked with the essay "The Tragedy of the Commons" by Garrett Hardin and with books by Ayn Rand and countered by "Management of the Commons" by Elinor Ostrom.

Lord of the Flies has been contrasted with the historical Tongan castaways incident from 1965, when a group of schoolboys on a fishing boat from Tonga were marooned on an uninhabited island and considered dead by their relatives. The group not only managed to survive for more than 15 months, but they "had set up a small commune with food garden, hollowed-out tree trunks to store rainwater, a gymnasium with curious weights, a badminton court, chicken pens, and a permanent fire, all from handiwork, an old knife blade, and much determination" according to reports. When the Tongan boys were found by a ship captain, Peter Warner, they were in good health and spirits and had developed an orderly adaptation to their stranding. When writing about the Tongan event, the Dutch historian, Rutger Bregman, said that comparing the incident to Golding's fictional portrayal made him consider the Lord of the Flies as unrealistic.

In a 2025 PopMatters reappraisal, cultural critic Charles Switzer stated, "That's why Lord of the Flies still resonates. In an age when young people face constant pressure to conform, perform, and pick sides — whether online or in real-world social hierarchies — the breakdown on Golding's island feels painfully familiar. The fear of being cast out, the seduction of belonging at any cost, the ease with which violence becomes a form of power — these aren't relics of colonial history. They're part of the emotional architecture that today's young people still must navigate."

=== Awards ===
Lord of the Flies was awarded a place on both lists of Modern Library 100 Best Novels, reaching number 41 on the editor's list and 25 on the reader's list. In 2003, Lord of the Flies was listed at number 70 on the BBC survey, The Big Read, and in 2005, it was chosen by Time magazine as one of the 100 best English-language novels since 1923. Time also included the novel in its list of the 100 Best Young-Adult Books of All Time.

Popular in schools, especially in the English-speaking world, a 2016 UK poll saw Lord of the Flies ranked third in the nation's favourite books from school, behind George Orwell's Animal Farm and Charles Dickens' Great Expectations.

In 2019, BBC News included Lord of the Flies on its list of the 100 most inspiring novels.

== In other media ==
=== Film and television ===
Three film adaptations and a television miniseries were produced based on the book:

- Lord of the Flies (1963), a British film directed by Peter Brook
- Alkitrang Dugo (1975), a Filipino film, directed by Lupita A. Concio
- Lord of the Flies (1990), an American film directed by Harry Hook
- Lord of the Flies (2026), a British miniseries written by Jack Thorne, directed by Marc Munden

Another adaptation, to feature an all-female cast, was announced by Warner Bros. in August 2017. Subsequently abandoned, it inspired the 2021 television series Yellowjackets. Ladyworld, an all-female adaptation, was released in 2018.

In April 2023, the BBC announced that the British production company Eleven Film would produce the first ever television adaptation of the novel, written by screenwriter Jack Thorne. It premiered on BBC One on 8 February 2026, with all episodes being available on BBC iPlayer from this date also. The TV series contains four one-hour episodes.

=== Stage ===
The book was first adapted for the stage and performed in 1984 at Clifton College Preparatory School. It was adapted by Elliot Watkins, a teacher at the school, with the personal consent of Golding (the only stage production so endorsed, as he was dead by the time it was adapted again), who attended the opening night.

Nigel Williams wrote his own adaptation of the text for the stage some ten years later. It was debuted by the Royal Shakespeare Company in July 1995. The Pilot Theatre Company toured it extensively in the United Kingdom and elsewhere.

In October 2014 it was announced that the 2011 production of Lord of the Flies would return for the 2015 season at the Regent's Park Open Air Theatre ahead of a major UK tour. The production was to be directed by Timothy Sheader.

Kansas-based Orange Mouse Theatricals and Mathew Klickstein produced a topical, gender-bending adaptation called Ladies of the Fly that was co-written by a group of girls aged 8 to 16 based on the original text and their own lives. The production was performed by the girls as an immersive live-action show in August 2016.

=== Radio ===
In June 2013, BBC Radio 4 Extra broadcast a dramatisation by Judith Adams in four 30-minute episodes directed by Sasha Yevtushenko. The cast included Ruth Wilson as narrator, Finn Bennett as Ralph, Richard Linnel as Jack, Caspar Hilton-Hilley as Piggy, and Jack Caine as Simon.

=== Graphic novel ===
A graphic novel based on the book, adapted and illustrated by Aimée de Jongh, was published on 12 September 2024 in 35 countries. The Dutch version of the book sold out in a day. It was the 2026 winner of the Eisner Award for Best Adaptation from Another Medium.

== Legacy ==
=== Literature ===
Author Stephen King named his fictional town of Castle Rock after Jack's mountain camp in Lord of the Flies. The book itself appears prominently in King's novels Cujo (1981), Misery (1987), and Hearts in Atlantis (1999). His novel It was influenced by Golding's novel: "I thought to myself I'd really like to write a story about what's gained and what's lost when you go from childhood to adulthood, and also, the things we experience in childhood that are like seeds that blossom later on." In 2011, King wrote an introduction for a new edition of Lord of the Flies to mark the centenary of Golding's birth. King's town of Castle Rock inspired the name of Rob Reiner's production company, Castle Rock Entertainment.

Alan Garner credits the book with making him want to become a writer.

The novel Garden Lakes by Jaime Clarke is an homage to the work.

=== Music ===
Iron Maiden wrote a song inspired by the book, included in their 1995 album The X Factor.

The Camerawalls include a song titled "Lord of the Flies" on their 2008 album Pocket Guide to the Otherworld.

== See also ==
- Batavia (1628 ship)
- "Das Bus", an episode of The Simpsons with a similar plot
- Heart of Darkness (1899), short novel by Joseph Conrad
- Humankind: A Hopeful History
- A High Wind in Jamaica
- Island mentality
- Robbers Cave Experiment
- Two Years' Vacation (1888), adventure novel by Jules Verne
