= Castaway =

Person who is cast adrift or ashore, usually in a shipwreck

U.S. merchant seamen try to revive a shipwrecked Filipino fisherman rescued in the South China Sea (1983)

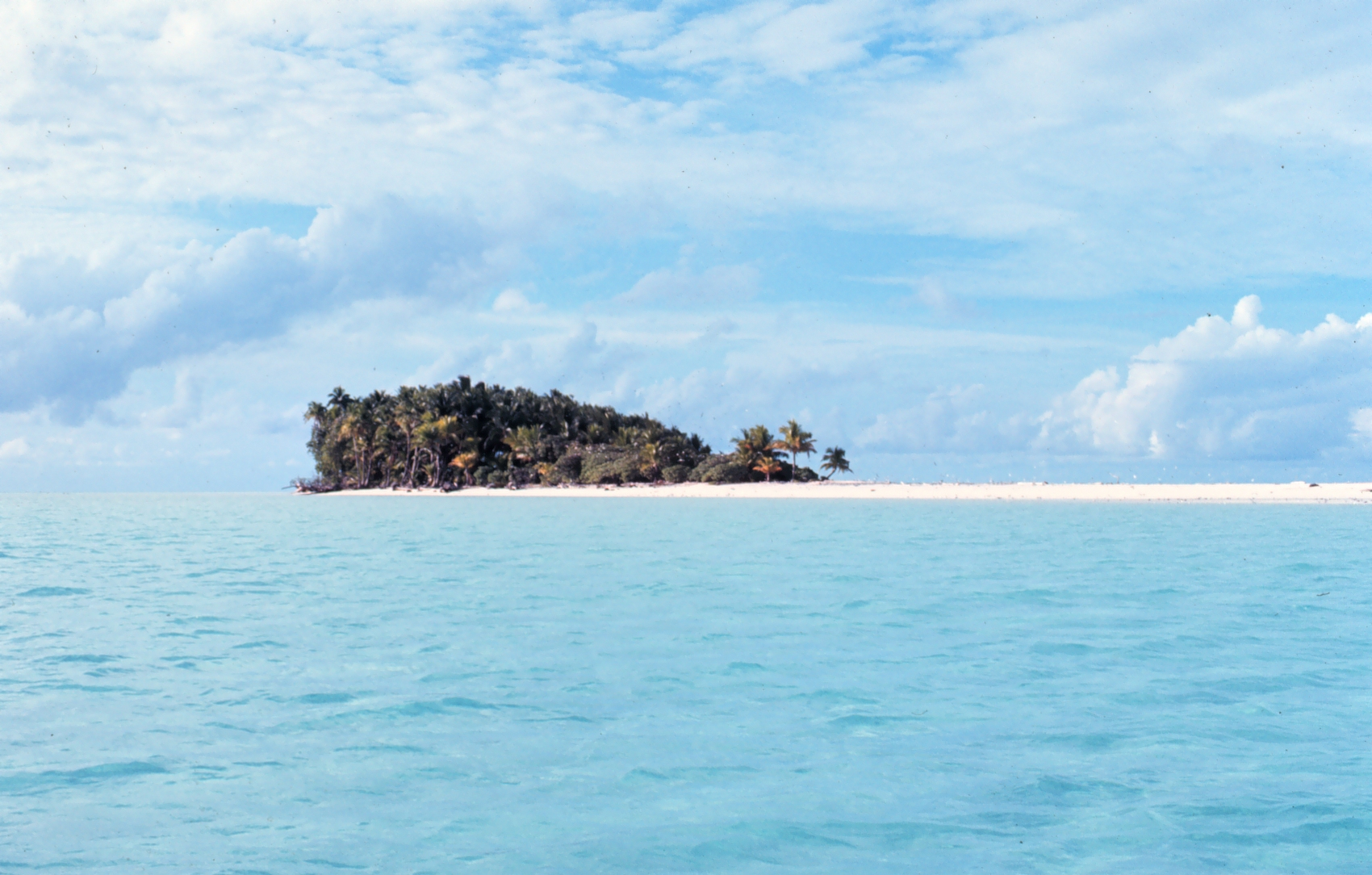
Castaways may need to survive on a desert island.

A castaway is a person who is cast adrift or ashore. While the situation usually happens after a shipwreck, some people voluntarily stay behind on a desert island, either to evade captors or the world in general. A person may also be left ashore as punishment, known as marooning.

The provisions and resources available to castaways may allow them to live on the island until other people arrive to take them off the island. However, such rescue missions may never happen if the person is not known to still be alive, if the fact that they are missing is unknown, or if the island is not mapped. These scenarios have given rise to the plots of numerous stories in the form of novels and film.

== Real occurrences ==
=== Thorgisl ===
Icelander Thorgisl set out to travel to Greenland. He and his party were first driven into a remote sound on the east coast of Greenland. Thorgisl, his infant son, and several others were then abandoned there by their thralls. Thorgisl and his party traveled slowly along the coast to the Eystribyggð settlement of Erik the Red on the southwest coast of Greenland. Along the way, they met a Viking, an outlaw who had escaped to East Greenland. This history is told in Flóamanna saga and Origines Islandicae and occurred during the early years of Viking Greenland, while Leif Ericson was still alive.

=== Grettir Ásmundarson ===
Icelander Grettir Ásmundarson was outlawed by the assembly in Iceland. After many years on the run, he and two companions went to the forbidden island of Drangey, where he lived several more years before his pursuers managed to kill him in 1031.

=== Fernão Lopes ===
The Portuguese soldier Fernão Lopes was marooned on the island of Saint Helena in 1513. He had lost his right hand, the thumb of his left hand, his nose, and his ears as punishment for mutiny and apostasy for converting to Islam. For the rest of his life – he died in about 1545 – Lopes stayed on the island, except for two years around 1530, when the Portuguese king helped him travel to Rome, where the Pope granted him absolution for his sin of apostasy.

=== Juan de Cartagena and Pedro Sánchez Reina ===
In April 1520, a mutiny broke out in Magellan's fleet while at the Patagonian seashore. Magellan put it down and executed some of the ringleaders. He then punished two others: the King of Spain's delegate, Juan de Cartagena and the priest, Pedro Sánchez Reina, by marooning them in that desolate place. They were never heard from again.

=== Gonzalo de Vigo ===
Gonzalo de Vigo was a Spanish sailor (Galician) who deserted from Gonzalo Gómez de Espinosa's Trinidad, part of the Spanish expedition of Ferdinand Magellan, while in the Maug Islands in August 1522. He lived with the Chamorros for four years and visited thirteen main islands in the Marianas until he was unexpectedly found in Guam in 1526 by the flagship of the Loaísa Expedition, on its way to the Spice Islands and the second circumnavigation of the globe. Gonzalo de Vigo was the first recorded European castaway in the history of the Pacific Ocean.

=== Marguerite de La Rocque ===
A French noblewoman, Marguerite de la Rocque, was marooned in 1542 on an island in the Gulf of St Lawrence, off the coast of Quebec. She was left by her near relative Jean-François de La Rocque de Roberval, a nobleman privateer, as punishment for her affair with a young man on board ship. The young man joined her, as did a servant woman, both of whom later died, as did the baby de la Rocque bore. Marguerite survived by hunting wild animals and was later rescued by fishermen. She returned to France and became well known when her story was recorded by the Queen of Navarre in her work Heptaméron.

=== Otokichi ===
A ship that left southeast Japan with 14 crew in October 1832 was swept out to sea by a typhoon. In January 1834, the damaged ship with no mast or rudder washed ashore on Cape Alava in present-day Washington State carrying three survivors, Otokichi, Iwakichi, and Kyukichi, after drifting roughly 5,000 miles (8,000 km) across the open Pacific.

=== Jan Pelgrom de Bye and Wouter Loos ===
In 1629 Jan Pelgrom de Bye van Bemel, a cabin boy, and Wouter Loos, a 24-year-old soldier, had been on board the Dutch ship Batavia. The ship was famous because it was wrecked on Morning Reef of the Wallabi Group of the Houtman Abrolhos, (off the west coast of Australia) leading to the infamous Batavia Mutiny and mass killings. When all culprits were arrested on the islets, most of them were either hanged or sent to court in the town of Batavia (now Jakarta). However, Jan Pelgrom and Wouter Loos were marooned on the Australian mainland, probably at or near the mouth of Hutt River in Western Australia, on 16 November 1629. They were the first Europeans to reside in Australia. Abel Tasman (after whom Tasmania was named) was subsequently ordered to search for the castaways on his voyage along the coasts of northern Australia in 1643–44 but did not sail that far south. They were not seen again by Europeans. It has been argued by Rupert Gerritsen in And Their Ghosts May Be Heard and subsequent publications that they survived and had a profound influence on local Aboriginal groups such as the Nhanda and Amangu.

=== 68 passengers and crew from Vergulde Draeck ===
In the early hours of 28 April 1656 a Dutch vessel belonging to the Verenigde Oostindische Compagnie (VOC), Vergulde Draeck, struck a reef off Ledge Point on the central west coast of Western Australia, about 5 kilometres from shore, and approximately 90 kilometres north of where Perth now stands. At least 75 individuals made it to shore, where they camped. Seven men departed in a boat, making for Batavia, now known as Jakarta, at the western end of Java. They arrived there on 7 June 1656 and raised the alarm. A number of ships were then dispatched over the following two years to search for the survivors who had remained behind, but an incorrect latitude meant the searches focused on the wrong area. The original campsite, by then abandoned, was not found until 26 February 1658, by a shore party led by Upper Steersman Abraham Leeman. There has been much speculation as to the fate of the 68, who may have ended up east of Geraldton, approximately 350 kilometres to the north, ultimately integrating with the local Aboriginal population. Two stone arrangements, the Ring of Stones, found to the north in modern times may have been markers left by the 68 survivors. Archaeological investigations are continuing in an endeavour to locate the original campsite.

=== Upper Steersman Abraham Leeman and 13 others ===
On 28 March 1658, while searching for the 68 survivors of the wreck of Vergulde Draeck along the lower central west coast of Western Australia, Upper Steersman Abraham Leeman and his boat crew of 13 from Waeckende Boey (also known as Waeckende Boeij ("Watching Buoy")) were inexplicably abandoned by the skipper of that ship, Samuel Volkersen. They were then about 180 km north of present-day Perth. Their boat was in poor condition, they had no water, just a few pounds of flour contaminated by seawater, and some rashers of bacon.

Leeman, who kept a journal, rallied his crew. They found water by digging on an offshore islet, and then killed seals and dried the meat, using the skins to raise the sides of the boat. Leeman even constructed his own compass. They then set sail for Java. They made their way up the Western Australian coast, and after a voyage of 2500 km reached the eastern end of Java with the loss of only one man. In endeavouring to land, their boat was wrecked and many of the men ran off into the jungle. Leeman and his three remaining companions then walked the full length of the south coast of Java, through jungle, volcanic country, braving marauding tigers along the way. Upon getting to the western end of Java they were captured by a Javanese prince and held for ransom. The Dutch then paid the ransom and Leeman and his compatriots finally made it to Batavia (Jakarta) on 23 September 1658.

=== A Miskito called Will ===
In 1681, a Miskito named Will by his English comrades was sent ashore as part of an English foraging party to Más a Tierra. When he was hunting for goats in the interior of the island, he suddenly saw his comrades departing in haste after having spotted the approach of enemies, leaving Will behind to survive until he was picked up in 1684.

=== Alexander Selkirk ===
The Juan Fernández Islands, to which Más a Tierra belongs, would have a more famous occupant in October 1704 when Alexander Selkirk made the decision to stay there. Selkirk, a sailor with the William Dampier expedition, became concerned about the condition and seaworthiness of the Cinque Ports, the vessel on which he was sailing, and chose to be put ashore on the island. The ship later sank with most of its crew being lost. Being a voluntary castaway, Selkirk was able to gather numerous provisions to help him to survive, including a musket, gunpowder, carpenter's tools, a knife, a Bible, and clothing. He survived on the island for four years and four months, building huts and hunting the plentiful wildlife before his rescue on 2 February 1709. His adventures are said to be a possible inspiration for Robinson Crusoe, a novel by Daniel Defoe published in 1719.

=== Philip Ashton ===
Philip Ashton, born in Marblehead, Massachusetts, in 1702, was captured by pirates while fishing near the coast of Nova Scotia in June 1722. He managed to escape in March 1723 when the pirates' ship landed at Roatán in the Bay Islands of Honduras, hiding in the jungle until the pirates left him there. He survived for 16 months, in spite of many insects, tropical heat, and crocodiles. He had no equipment at all until he met another castaway, an Englishman. The Englishman disappeared after a few days but he left behind a knife, gunpowder, tobacco, and more. Ashton was finally rescued by the Diamond, a ship from Salem, Massachusetts.

=== Survivors of the Zuytdorp ===
The Zuytdorp departed from the Cape of Good Hope on 22 April 1712 with at least 200 to 250 people on board, including women and children, and disappeared. It is now thought to have struck the Zuytdorp Cliffs on the central coast of Western Australia in early June 1712. The first signs of the wreck were found in 1927 but it was not until 1959 that the identity of the wreck was confirmed by Dr. Philip Playford. The discovery of a considerable amount of material from the wreck on the scree slope and top of the cliffs established that many people had managed to get off the stricken vessel and on to shore. Exactly how many people survived the disaster is uncertain and estimates vary from 30 up to 180 or more. There has been speculation that the survivors headed east along the Murchison River, 60 kilometres to the south. However, finds of a coin and a 'Leyden Tobacco Tin' at wells to the north, as well as linguistic and technological evidence suggest they headed north, perhaps ending up in the northern Gascoyne, about 450 kilometres north of the wrecksite. It is thought the survivors ultimately integrated with local Aboriginal populations.

=== Leendert Hasenbosch ===
Leendert Hasenbosch was a Dutch ship's officer (a bookkeeper), probably born in 1695. He was set ashore on the uninhabited Ascension Island on 5 May 1725 as a punishment for sodomy. He was left behind with a tent, a survival kit, and an amount of water sufficient to last about four weeks. He had bad luck in that no ships called at the island during his stay. He ate seabirds and green turtles, but probably died of thirst after about six months. He wrote a diary that was found in January 1726 by British mariners who brought the diary back to Britain. The diary was rewritten and published a number of times.

In 2002, his story was disclosed in a book by Dutch historian Michiel Koolbergen (1953–2002), the first to mention Hasenbosch by name. Before that time, the castaway's name had not been known. The story is available in English as A Dutch Castaway on Ascension Island in 1725.

=== Charles Barnard ===
In 1812, the British ship Isabella, captained by George Higton, was shipwrecked off Eagle Island, one of the Falkland Islands. Most of the crew were rescued by the American sealer Nanina, commanded by Captain Charles Barnard. However, realising that they would require more provisions for the expanded number of passengers, Barnard and a few others went out in a party to retrieve more food. During his absence, the Nanina was taken over by the British crew, who left them on the island. Barnard and his party were finally rescued in November 1814. In 1829, Barnard wrote, A Narrative of the Sufferings and Adventures of Captain Charles Barnard, detailing the happenings.

=== Crews of the Grafton and Invercauld ===
On January 3, 1864, the 56-ton schooner Grafton was wrecked in the north arm of Carnley Harbour, Auckland Island. The five-man crew, led by Captain Thomas Musgrave and Francois Edouard Raynal as mate, spent twenty months on the island until three of them went out for rescue in the ship's dinghy, sailing more than 400 km up north to Stewart Island. All men survived. Unknown to them, on May 11, 1864, the ship Invercauld bound from Melbourne to Callao was wrecked in bad weather on the west coast of the same island. From the initial crew of 25, only 19 made it to shore and after more than a year spent on the island only three men survived starvation and cold, being rescued by a ship looking for a shelter to make repairs.

=== Steven Callahan ===
A week after sailing from the Canary Islands on January 19, 1982, Steven Callahan's self-made sloop Napoleon Solo had hit an unknown object during a night storm, he managed to escape into a six man life raft, diving into the sinking boat a few times in order to get the supplies he needed for survival before cutting his raft loose. Utilising 2 solar stills (a third of which was cut open to find out how they worked) and eating fish, barnacles and birds he captured, he survived for 76 days adrift before reaching the Caribbean, where he was discovered and rescued by local fishermen.

=== Strathmore ===
Survivors of the Strathmore survived for 7 months on a small island of the Crozet Islands from 1875 to 1876. They survived from eating eggs and flesh of geese, albatrosses and other seabirds. They also ate root vegetables and fish. The survival was the input for, among others, the book “Survival on the Crozet Islands: The Wreck of the Strathmore in 1875”.

=== Other castaways ===
Other castaways in history include:

- Pedro Serrano, a 16th-century Spanish sailor marooned on a small island in the Caribbean.
- James Knight and his crew perished on Marble Island in 1721 while looking for the Northwest Passage.
- Four Russian whalers, Aleksei Inkov, Khrisanf Inkov, Stepan Sharapov, and Fedor Verigin, survived from 1743 to 1749 probably on Halvmåneøya in the Svalbard group of Norwegian islands; one died shortly before rescue.
- The French cargo ship L’Utile ran aground in 1761 on an island of sand and coral today known as Tromelin Island on its way to Mauritius while on an unofficial detour when travelling from Madagascar, carrying an unauthorised cargo of slaves. A flat bottom ship was made using the remains of the wreckage and 80 Malagasy were left on the island with three months supplies and were told that the 122 departing sailors would send help at the first opportunity. They were rescued 15 years later.
- The Bounty's mutineers and Tahitian women.
- James Riley, who led his crew through the Sahara Desert, after they were shipwrecked off the coast of Western Sahara in August 1815.
- Juana Maria, the last surviving member of the Nicoleño, who lived alone on San Nicolas Island, California, from 1835 to 1853 and inspired Scott O'Dell's Island of the Blue Dolphins.
- Nakahama Manjirō, a Japanese fisherman's son, shipwrecked on Tori-shima in 1841, who was rescued by an American ship and played a role in the opening up of Japan to the West.
- James Morrill, an English sailor who was shipwrecked off the coast of north-eastern Australia in 1846. After surviving a journey in a makeshift raft to the mainland, he was taken in by a local clan of Aboriginal Australians. He adopted their language and customs and lived as a member of their society for 17 years before joining the newly established British colony.
- Narcisse Pelletier, a 14-year-old French cabin boy who was abandoned on the Cape York Peninsula in Australia in 1858. He was adopted by an Aboriginal family with whom he lived for 17 years before being discovered by the crew of a passing ship and returned to France against his will.
- A number of crew members on the Polaris Expedition on a polar expedition were accidentally cast a float on an ice floe and endured six months and 2900 km living in tents and igloos while moving from floe to floe.
- On the Jeannette expedition to the north pole, after being frozen in pack ice and spending 16 months adrift their ship was crushed. 33 Men took to the ice to walk and sail to the Lena River on the Siberian Coast. 13 survivors made it back to the United States.
- 6 sailors from the American schooner Sarah W. Hunt, a whaler, were stranded on Campbell Island, New Zealand in 1883 until been rescued by a seal protection boat, the Kekeno.
- 22 men of Ernest Shackleton's Trans-Antarctic expedition were stranded on Elephant Island off the Antarctic Peninsula for four months in 1916.
- Ada Blackjack, an Inuk woman left alone (1921–23) on Wrangel Island when a European expedition went wrong.
- Poon Lim, a Chinese sailor who survived 133 days alone in the South Atlantic after his ship was torpedoed by the German Kriegsmarine. Rescued in 1943. His story partly used by Alfred Bester in The Stars My Destination (1956) as an idiom for the protagonist Gully Foyle.
- The Tongan castaways, a group of teenage boys who ran away from school in 1965 and ended up marooned on an island in the Pacific for 15 months. Their story has been held as a parallel with the fictional boy castaways in the novel Lord of the Flies.
- Gerald Kingsland and Lucy Irvine, author of Castaway, British writers and self-imposed castaways for a year (1982–83) on Barney Island, Queensland, in the Torres Strait between New Guinea and Australia
- Jesús Vidaña, Salvador Ordóñez and Lucio Rendón, three Mexican fishermen from the port of San Blas, Nayarit who sailed 5,500 miles (8,900 km) in nine months before being rescued 200 miles (320 km) from the Marshall Islands on August 9, 2006.
- On December 19, 2011, two fishermen from the Republic of Kiribati landed in the Marshall Islands where they were rescued by the U.S. Coast Guard. The men were adrift for 33 days and fed on tuna. The two men, aged 53 and 26, were also involved in a rare incident upon landing when the 26-year-old found that his uncle, who had disappeared at sea more than 25 years ago and was long believed dead, had landed in the Marshall Islands as well and married there, where he also had children.
- Three Bougainvilleans traveling from Nissan Island to Buka Island on a dinghy ran out of power and were set adrift into the Pacific, being rescued 70 days later by an international vessel near Kiribati.

== Castaways in popular culture ==
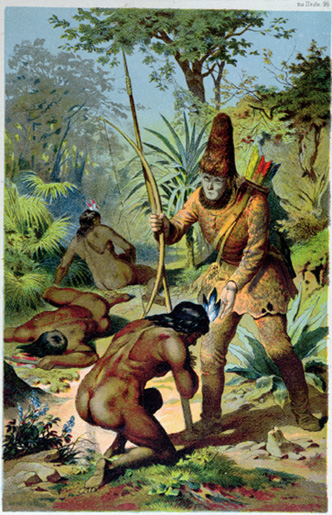
Robinson Crusoe (1719) by Daniel Defoe. Illustration of Crusoe standing over Man Friday after freeing him from the cannibals.

Various novels, television shows and films tell the story of castaways:

=== Pre-20th century ===
- The Odyssey, an ancient Greek epic attributed to Homer.
- Sinbad the Sailor, a Middle Eastern folk tale.
- Hayy ibn Yaqdhan (Philosophus Autodidactus), a 12th-century novel by Ibn Tufail.
- Theologus Autodidactus, a 13th-century novel by Ibn al-Nafis.
- The Tempest, a 1611 play by William Shakespeare.
- Wildflower: The Barbara Crawford Thompson Story, is based on the life of a 12-year-old Barbara Crawford who was taken from her home in Sydney in 1843. She was rescued after being shipwrecked in November 1844.
- Robinson Crusoe (1719), a novel by Daniel Defoe based loosely on the real life of Alexander Selkirk, first published in 1719 and sometimes regarded as the first novel in English.
- Lemuel Gulliver, a physician in Gulliver's Travels, a satire by Jonathan Swift.
- The Swiss Family Robinson, an 1812 book by Johann David Wyss that has been adapted into various film and television versions.
- Ben Gunn, a pirate marooned in Treasure Island (1883) by Robert Louis Stevenson.
- Several late 19th century novels by Jules Verne, such as:
  - In Search of the Castaways, published in 1868, narrating the search for Captain Grant by his children after a message in a bottle from him is found.
  - The Mysterious Island, published in 1874.
  - Godfrey Morgan, published in 1882, also known as School for Robinsons.
  - Two Years' Vacation, published in 1888, which relates the fortunes of a group of schoolboys stranded on a desert island.

=== Literature ===
This is a list of fiction. There are also memoirs such as Castaway.

- The Blue Lagoon, a 1908 romance novel by Henry De Vere Stacpoole about two children stranded on a tropical island after a shipwreck, with multiple film adaptations.
- Baby Island, a 1937 novel by Carol Ryrie Brink about two preteen sisters caring for four babies on a South Seas island.
- Survivor Type, a 1982 short story by Stephen King about a shipwrecked surgeon who ends up eating parts of his own body to survive.
- Lord of the Flies, a novel by William Golding, and several movie versions.
- Hatchet, a novel that follows the life of a teenage boy as he survives in the Canadian wilderness after the plane he was on crashes.
- Island of the Blue Dolphins, a book by Scott O'Dell about a girl marooned on an island for 18 years.
- Kensuke's Kingdom, a 1999 children's novel by Michael Morpurgo about a boy who travels the world with his parents but ends up marooned on an island.
- The End, the final novel in A Series of Unfortunate Events.
- The Martian, a 2011 novel by Andy Weir, later a film, in which the Castaway literary tradition of self-reliance and will to survive is transposed to the planet Mars.

=== Films ===
| Title | Director | Notable cast | Summary | Released | Notes |
|---|---|---|---|---|---|
| The Blue Lagoon | W. Bowden, Dick Cruickshanks | Molly Adair | First film adaptation of the novel. | 1923 | |
| Mr. Robinson Crusoe | A. Edward Sutherland | Douglas Fairbanks | A yachtsman makes a bet his friends that he can swim ashore on a remote island in the South Seas with nothing but a toothbrush and be "living the life of Riley" when they return. | 1932 | |
| The Blue Lagoon | Frank Launder | Jean Simmons, Donald Houston | Second film adaptation of the novel. | 1949 | |
| Miss Robin Crusoe | Eugene Frenke | Amanda Blake, George Nader, Rosalind Hayes | A variation of Robinson Crusoe starring Amanda Blake as Robin Crusoe. | 1953 | |
| Robinson Crusoe | Luis Buñuel | Daniel O'Herlihy | Adaptation based on the book of the same name. Lead actor Dan O'Herlihy, playing Crusoe, was nominated for the 1955 Academy Award for Best Actor – making him the only actor to receive a nomination for the role. | 1954 | |
| Swiss Family Robinson | Ken Annakin | John Mills, Dorothy McGuire, James MacArthur | Walt Disney adaptation based on the book of the same name. | 1960 | |
| In Search of the Castaways | Robert Stevenson | Hayley Mills, Maurice Chevalier, George Sanders, Wilfrid Hyde-White, Michael Anderson Jr. | Walt Disney adaptation based on the book of the same name. | 1962 | |
| Lord of the Flies | Peter Brook | James Aubrey, Tom Chapin and Hugh Edwards | Based on the book of the same name. | 1963 | Awards: 1 NBR Award |
| Lt. Robin Crusoe, U.S.N. | Byron Paul | Dick Van Dyke | Walt Disney adaptation based on the book of the same name. | 1966 | Awards: 1 Golden Laurel |
| Hell in the Pacific | John Boorman | Lee Marvin, Toshiro Mifune | An American pilot and a Japanese naval captain match wits when both are marooned on an uninhabited island during World War II. | 1968 | |
| Swept Away | Lina Wertmüller | Giancarlo Giannini, Mariangela Melato | A rich woman and a communist sailor are stranded on an island in the Mediterranean Sea. | 1974 | Awards: 1 David di Donatello Award, 1 other award |
| The Blue Lagoon | Randal Kleiser | Brooke Shields, Christopher Atkins, Leo McKern | Two children survive a shipwreck and grow up on a tropical island in the South Pacific. | 1980 | Third film version of the novel. |
| Castaway | Nicolas Roeg | Oliver Reed, Amanda Donohoe | Based on the book of the same name. | 1986 | |
| Lord of the Flies | Harry Hook | Balthazar Getty, Chris Furrh, Danuel Pipoly | Shipwrecked on a tropical island, a group of English schoolchildren eventually revert to savagery in spite of the efforts of a few rational children. | 1990 | Remake of the 1963 film of the same title. |
| Return to the Blue Lagoon | William A. Graham | Brian Krause, Milla Jovovich, Lisa Pelikan | The son of the original castaways is marooned with a young girl on a tropical island. | 1991 | Sequel to The Blue Lagoon. |
| Robinson Crusoe | Rod Hardy, George T. Miller | Pierce Brosnan | Film adaptation loosely based on the novel. | 1997 | |
| Six Days Seven Nights | Ivan Reitman | Harrison Ford, Anne Heche, David Schwimmer | A New York magazine editor and a pilot fight pirates and face other dangers after crash landing on a desert island in the South Seas. | 1998 | |
| Cast Away | Robert Zemeckis | Tom Hanks | After surviving a plane crash, a FedEx systems analyst finds himself stranded on a desert island in the South Pacific. | 2000 | Awards: 1 Golden Globe, 15 other awards |
| Swept Away | Guy Ritchie | Madonna, Adriano Giannini, Bruce Greenwood | Remake of the 1974 film of the same title. | 2002 | |
| Survival Island | Stewart Raffill | Billy Zane, Kelly Brook, Juan Pablo Di Pace | A love triangle turns deadly when a husband and wife, and her lover, are stranded on a desert island. | 2005 | |
| The Breed | Nicholas Mastandrea | Michelle Rodriguez, Oliver Hudson, Taryn Manning | A group of college students fly to a desert island for a party weekend find themselves under siege by murderous hounds. | 2006 | |
| Kensuke's Kingdom | Neil Boyle, Kirk Hendry | Sally Hawkins, Cillian Murphy, Raffey Cassidy, Ken Watanabe | Animated adaptation of the 1999 children's novel by Michael Morpurgo | 2023 | Nominated for the BAFTA Award for Best Children's & Family Film at the 78th British Academy Film Awards |

=== Television ===
| Title | Network | Notable cast | Summary | Years | Notes |
|---|---|---|---|---|---|
| 77 Sunset Strip – Secret Island | ABC | Efrem Zimbalist Jr., Jacques Bergerac, Grant Sullivan, Catherine McLeod, Tuesday Weld, Kathleen Crowley | While flying from the Philippines, Stuart Bailey, his prisoner, and four other survivors of a plane crash reach an isolated island, only to discover that it's the target of an h bomb test. | December 4, 1959 | |
| Gilligan's Island | CBS | Bob Denver, Alan Hale Jr., Jim Backus, Natalie Schafer, Tina Louise, Russell Johnson, Dawn Wells | Classic sitcom about seven castaways stranded on a desert island somewhere in the Pacific Ocean after a shipwreck. | 1964–1967 | Awards: 3 TV Land Awards, 1 other award |
| The Admirable Crichton | NBC | Norman Barrs, Pamela Brown, Edward Cicciarelli | A group of English aristocrats are shipwrecked when their yacht runs around on an island in the South Pacific. | 1968 | Television film |
| The New People | ABC | Tiffany Bolling, Zooey Hall, David Moses | A group of young college students are stranded after their plane crashes on a mysterious island in the South Pacific. | 1969–1970 | |
| Lost Flight | NBC | Lloyd Bridges, Anne Francis, Ralph Meeker | The crew and passengers of a jet airliner crash struggle to survive on an uninhabited island in the South Pacific. | 1970 | Television film |
| Der Seewolf | ZDF; ORTF | Edward Meeks, Raimund Harmstorf | Based on the book of the same name. | 1971–1973 | Television miniseries |
| The Six Million Dollar Man - Survival of the Fittest | ABC | Lee Majors, Richard Anderson | Oscar Goldman becomes the target for several conspirators who want to stop him from negotiating with the Russians. As he and Steve Austin fly back to Washington, D.C., their plane is caught in a storm, and they crash land on an island in the Pacific Ocean. Amongst the survivors are the conspirators who want to kill Oscar. | January 25, 1974 | |
| The Cay | NBC | James Earl Jones, Alfred Lutter III | Based on the book of the same name. | 1974 | Television film |
| The Bionic Woman - Fly Jamie | ABC | Lindsay Wagner, Martin E. Brooks | Jaime is undercover as stewardess Miss Winters to keep an eye on Rudy Wells, who is transporting a top-secret Cobalt 247 formula. The plane goes down in an electrical storm and the passengers end up on a desert island where the conspirators will do anything to get the formula from Rudy. | May 5, 1976 | |
| Shogun | NBC | Richard Chamberlain, Toshiro Mifune, Yoko Shimada | An English navigator and his crew are shipwrecked in feudal Japan. | 1980 | Television miniseries. Awards: 3 Golden Globes, 5 other awards |
| Danger Island | NBC | Lisa Banes, Richard Beymer, Maria Celedonio | A group of vacationers survive an airliner at sea on a flight and are cast ashore on a mysterious island. | 1992 | Television film |
| Mysterious Island | Family Channel | Alan Scarfe, Colette Stevenson, Stephen Lovatt | Based on the book of the same name. | 1995 | |
| Bermuda Triangle | ABC | Sam Behrens, Susanna Thompson, Lisa Jakub | After their boat sinks in an unusual storm, a family become stranded on an island in the "27th dimension". | 1996 | Television film |
| Forbidden Island | | Nikita Ager, Paul Kersey, Grayson McCouch | Survivors of a plane crash are stranded on a mysterious tropical island which possesses supernatural powers. | 1999 | |
| Survivor/Expedition Robinson | Various | N/A | Reality game show in which contestants various remote island areas while competing in challenges and progressively vote each other out of the game. | 1997– | |
| Castaway 2000 | BBC | N/A | Reality television series in which a volunteer community lived for a year on the previously uninhabited Taransay in the Outer Hebrides. | 2000–2001 | |
| Jumping Ship | Disney Channel | Joey Lawrence, Matthew Lawrence, Andrew Lawrence | Three brothers sailing to Australia for summer vacation are forced to abandon ship during an encounter with modern-day pirates. | 2001 | Television movie. Sequel to Horse Sense. |
| Dinotopia | ABC | Tyron Leitso, Wentworth Miller, David Thewlis | Two American teenage boys on a joyride in their father's plane crash land on an isolated island where humans and sentient dinosaurs peacefully coexist. It later spawned a short-lived TV series. | 2002 | Television miniseries. Awards: 1 Primetime Emmy, 5 other awards |
| Lost | ABC | Terry O'Quinn, Matthew Fox, Evangeline Lilly, Josh Holloway, Jorge Garcia | Drama series about the 48 survivors of Oceanic Flight 815 as they try to survive on a mysterious island in the South Pacific. | 2004–2010 | Awards: 1 Golden Globe, 56 other awards |
| Mysterious Island | Hallmark Channel | Kyle MacLachlan, Gabrielle Anwar, Patrick Stewart | Based on the book of the same name. | 2005 | Television film |
| Flight 29 Down | Discovery Kids | Allen Alvarado, Corbin Bleu, Jeremy James Kissner, Johnny Pacar | Adventure series about teenagers after a plane crash on an island somewhere in the South Pacific. | 2005–2010 | Television show |
| Blue Lagoon: The Awakening | Lifetime | Indiana Evans, Brenton Thwaites | Remake of The Blue Lagoon set in the 21st century. | 2012 | Television film |
| MythBusters: Duct Tape Island | Discovery Channel | Adam Savage, Jamie Hyneman | Adam and Jamie recreate a castaway scenario: using only duct tape to survive both on a desert island and on their canoe. | 2012 | Television show |
| Arrow | WBTD | Stephen Amell, Katie Cassidy, Colin Donnell | Based on the fictional character Green Arrow. Oliver Queen is a castaway, and to survive he must forge himself into a weapon. He goes on to become a vigilante crime-fighter to clean up his city. | 2012– | |
| Awesomness/AwesomenessTV | Nickelodeon | N/A | A sketch called "Gillian's Island" has the titular castaway (portrayed by Amber Montana) showing viewers of her "TV series" how to survive on an island in the event that they get stranded and await for the day when someone comes to rescue them. | 2013 | Web series/Television show |

=== Games ===
- Johnny Castaway (1993), a screensaver that follows the daily exploits of its namesake
- The Island (1993)
- The ClueFinders 5th Grade Adventures: The Secret of the Living Volcano (1999), a PC game created by The Learning Company
- Survival Kids (1999)
- Pikmin (2001)
- Stranded (2003)
- Return to Mysterious Island (2004)
- Lost in Blue (2005)
- Let's Go Jungle!: Lost on the Island of Spice (2006)
- The Sims 2: Castaway (2007)
- Lost in Blue 2 (2007)
- Lost in Blue 3 (2007)
- Lost in Blue: Shipwrecked (2008)
- The Sims Castaway Stories (2008)
- Return to Mysterious Island 2 (2009)
- Tomb Raider (2013)
- Stranded Deep (2015)

=== Minor part of the story ===
Castaways are part of other stories as well, where the event is not the central plot but is still an important aspect. Examples include:

- The Black Stallion
- The Road to El Dorado
- Kidnapped

=== Desert Island Discs ===
Desert Island Discs is a BBC Radio 4 interview show in which the subject is invited to consider themselves as a castaway on a desert island, and then select their eight favourite records, one favourite book (in addition to The Bible and the Complete Works of Shakespeare), and a luxury inanimate object to occupy their time.

== See also ==
- Castaway depot
- Desert island
- Marooning
- Robinsonade
- Stowaway
- Feral child
- Trespasser
- Spy
