= Lost in Blue =

Video game series

- Genre: Survival game
- Developers: Konami; Matrix Software; Hudson Soft; Unity Technologies
- Publisher: Konami
- First release: Survival Kids; 1999
- Latest release: Survival Kids (2025); 2025

Lost in Blue (Survival Kids in Japan) is a series of survival video games developed and published by Konami. They revolve around the main characters being castaways on a desert island and being forced to scavenge for survival. The series saw two Game Boy Color releases starting in 1999, only one of which was localized, before going on a five-year hiatus. It then saw several Nintendo DS installments, adopting a new localized name, Lost in Blue. Following the release of a Wii installment of the series, it went on hiatus until the announcement of a new entry on Nintendo Switch 2.

== Games ==
Release timeline
| 1999 | Survival Kids |
| 2000 | Survival Kids 2: Escape the Twin Islands |
2001–2004
| 2005 | Lost in Blue |
2006
| 2007 | Lost in Blue 2 Lost in Blue 3 |
| 2008 | Lost in Blue: Shipwrecked |
2009–2024
| 2025 | Survival Kids (2025) |

=== Survival Kids ===
Survival Kids, known as Stranded Kids in Europe and Survival Kids: Kotou no Boukensha ("Adventurer of the Solitary Island") in Japan, is a Game Boy Color game developed by Konami that was released in 1999. At this point, the series did not yet have its localized title, Lost in Blue.

=== Survival Kids 2: Escape the Twin Islands ===
Survival Kids 2: Escape the Twin Islands (Survival Kids 2: Dasshutsu! Futago Shima in Japan) was released only in Japan on July 19, 2000, but received a fan translation into English on April 9, 2015. Like the original, it featured multiple endings, but also added multiple openings and Game Link Cable support.

=== Lost in Blue ===
Lost in Blue was released in 2005 for the Nintendo DS. The game follows two young teenagers, Keith and Skye, who struggle for survival on a deserted island. The player must learn to use the island's natural resources to create a makeshift home away from home.

=== Lost in Blue 2 ===
Lost in Blue 2 was developed by Matrix Software and released for the Nintendo DS in 2007. It follows Jack and Amy, two teenagers who have been shipwrecked on a deserted island.

=== Lost in Blue 3 ===
Lost in Blue 3 (Original Title: Survival Kids: 小さな島の大きな秘密!?, directly translates to "Survival Kids: The Big Secret of the Small Island!?") was developed by Matrix Software for the Nintendo DS. It was released on December 20, 2007 in Japan with the North American version released on March 18, 2008.

=== Lost in Blue: Shipwrecked ===
Lost in Blue: Shipwrecked was developed by Hudson Soft for the Wii. It was first released in Japan, and was later released in North America in 2008.

=== Survival Kids (2025) ===
A reboot of the series was released on June 5, 2025 to coincide with the launch of the Nintendo Switch 2. Even in English, it retains the series' Japanese name, Survival Kids. Unlike previous games in the series, it is a co-op survival game for up to 4 players. It was developed by Unity Technologies, more notable for developing the game engine Unity, in a rare opportunity of fully fledged video game development.
