= Survival Kids (2025 video game) =

2025 video game

- Developer: Unity Technologies
- Publisher: Konami
- Series: Lost in Blue
- Engine: Unity
- Platform: Nintendo Switch 2
- Release: WW: June 5, 2025
- Genre: Survival
- Modes: Multiplayer, single-player

Survival Kids, is a 2025 survival video game developed by Unity Technologies and published by Konami for the Nintendo Switch 2. The gameplay revolves around surviving on a deserted island, and features an open-ended structure that presents the player with multiple ways to progress. It is a reboot of the original Survival Kids game, which is part of the Lost in Blue series.

== Gameplay ==
The gameplay is different from the previous games of the series, being more focused on the multiplayer fun and game physics, than to the real survival aspect of the series. The game is mainly done in form of missions, each mission is an island the player has to explore, build their camp, find a way to the raft, repair it and then leave the island. There are a total of nine islands to explore.

The building aspect is still present in the game, where the player has to build their base camp and other objects such as Bridges, Climbing Nets and Rafts among other things. Specific tools such as Fishing Rods, Trampolines and Umbrellas can also be crafted after the player first obtain the plans for them; these tools would be required in order to solve the various puzzles of the islands. The home bases after being built, can be packed up and carried over another camp area, generally after repairing an elevator first. Each island also feature 3 Treasure Stones that need to be found in order to earn Stars at the end of the levels, which are used to unlock certain late levels and outfits.

== Development ==
A reboot of the series was released on June 5, 2025 to coincide with the launch of the Nintendo Switch 2. Even in English, it retains the series' Japanese name, Survival Kids. Unlike previous games in the series, it is a co-op survival game for up to four players. It is also the first game made by Unity Technologies in 20 years since GooBall. It was developed by Unity Technologies, more notable for developing the game engine Unity, in a rare opportunity of fully fledged video game development.

== Reception ==
The game received "mixed or average" reviews according to video game review aggregator website Metacritic, while GamesRadar+ called it "a largely unambitious but extremely accessible". Fellow review aggregator OpenCritic assessed that the game received weak approval, being recommended by only 38% of critics.
