= Jarijima =

Island in the South China Sea

Gravel Island
Disputed island

Geography
- Location: South China Sea
- Coordinates: 9°55′N 113°14′E
- Archipelago: Spratly Islands
- Length: 80 m (260 ft)
- Width: 40 m (130 ft)
- Highest point: 3 m

Gravel Island (砂利島|Jarijima) is a small, uninhabited island, located in the South China Sea. Gravel Island is part of the Spratly Islands. This coral and volcanic island is the smallest islet and the northwesternmost of a small group of three coral atolls. It has an area of 0.32 hectares (0.79 acres) (3,200 sq. m), and is mostly composed of loose stone. It is claimed by Japan, the People's Republic of China, and the Republic of China (Taiwan). Gravel Island is the only Spratly Island to be claimed by Japan.

== Environment ==
The island is a flat, fine gravel covered cay, it measures 80m by 40m, and is subject to erosion. It can become partially submerged throughout the year depending largely on the direction of seasonal winds and waves. The northernmost section of the island has some permanent vegetation. There are no fresh water sources on the island.

== History ==
On 21 March 1863, the French naval dispatch steamer Kien Chan rescued a pair of Japanese sailors marooned on the island. They called the island Jarijima, a Japanese double entendre, meaning gravel and child. The castaways had survived on the island for approximately a year before their return to Japan. Shortly after their rescue The Kien Chan went on to see action at the Shimonoseki Straits resulting in the death of one of the sailors. The sailors left a semi-permanent stone dwelling on the island

== Japanese claim ==
The island was listed in a survey by the Imperial Japanese Navy as a potential submarine supply depot. The island's official name was listed as 砂利島 (Jarijima, Gravel Island).
