= Castaway (film) =

1986 film by Nicolas Roeg

- Theatrical release poster
- Directed by: Nicolas Roeg
- Screenplay by: Allan Scott
- Based on: Castaway by Lucy Irvine
- Produced by: Rick McCallum
- Starring: Oliver Reed; Amanda Donohoe
- Cinematography: Harvey Harrison
- Edited by: Tony Lawson
- Music by: Stanley Myers; Hans Zimmer; Barry Guy
- Production companies: Cannon Screen Entertainment; United British Artists; Castaway Films Ltd.
- Distributed by: Columbia-Cannon-Warner Distributors
- Release date: 20 February 1986
- Running time: 117 minutes
- Countries: United Kingdom; United States
- Language: English
- Box office: $1 million (UK/US)

Castaway is a 1986 biographical-drama film directed by Nicolas Roeg and starring Amanda Donohoe and Oliver Reed. The screenplay was by Allan Scott, adapted from the eponymous 1984 book by Lucy Irvine, telling of her experiences of staying for a year with writer Gerald Kingsland on the isolated island of Tuin, between New Guinea and Australia.

== Premise ==
Lucy Irvine answers an advertisement to live with a man for one year on a deserted tropical island. They meet at dinner and have sex. They move to the island.

== Cast ==
- Oliver Reed as Gerald Kingsland
- Amanda Donohoe as Lucy Irvine
- Georgina Hale as Sister Saint Margaret
- Frances Barber as Sister Saint Winifred
- Tony Rickards as Jason
- Virginia Hey as Janice
- Todd Rippon as Rod

== Real-life inspiration ==
In 1981, Lucy Irvine responded to an advertisement placed by writer Gerald Kingsland, and they became self-imposed castaways for a year on the isolated and uninhabited island of Tuin, in the Torres Strait between New Guinea and Australia. Chosen by Kingsland from over 50 applicants, Irvine reluctantly agreed to marry him to satisfy immigration restrictions before they travelled to Tuin. She was 25 years old, and he was 49. After a year, they returned home, and in 1983, she published her account of the experience in Castaway, which was later used as the basis for the film.

== Development ==
The book sold more than half a million copies. In December 1984 it was announced United British Artists, headed by Richard Johnson, had bought the rights to the book and Nicolas Roeg would direct.

Irvine said, "My big dread was that the book would be taken up by a huge American company and be turned into a blockbuster sex and violence movie – a sort of punchier version of The Blue Lagoon. It was a big relief when United British Artists expressed interest and came up with Nic as director. I knew how clever he was filmically."

When Irvine met director Nicolas Roeg, he felt her story was perfect material for telling a relationship between an older man and a younger woman. It never was intended to be exactly like her experience, as Roeg felt Irvine would be too personally involved then. Irvine was positive about the film, stating she was pleased with Donohoe, Reed and Roeg.

The screenplay was written by Alan Scott, who had written Don't Look Now for Roeg.

Oliver Reed was cast as the male lead. In September 1985 it was announced Amanda Donohue would play Lucy Irvine. Filming was to have started that year on the Cook Islands, financed by Virgin Films. However Virgin's partners, a business consortium, pulled out of the movie, so Virgin pulled out as well. "These things happen," said Reed. "I"m happy just so long as things work out in the end."

== Production ==
It was decided to shoot the film in the Seychelles, which was easier to reach from London than Tuin. Thorn EMI stepped in to finance. Then four weeks into filming Thorn EMI sold their film division to Cannon.

In 2011, Donohoe recalled her experience working with Reed, stating: 'Well, naked on a desert island with Oliver Reed – it was a tabloid fantasy, wasn't it? He was an alcoholic and his behaviour was erratic, but he was always a courteous and good actor. His personal life wasn't working but he never crossed any lines professionally.'

== Soundtrack ==
The film opens with a song by the English singer Kate Bush, "Be Kind to My Mistakes". A slightly edited version later appeared on the 1997 re-release of her fifth studio album Hounds of Love (1985). The soundtrack begins with a different version of the same song, which was also released as a 7-inch single. The rest of the soundtrack album is instrumental and composed by Stanley Myers. It received a limited CD release in 2013.

== Release ==
The film made its debut at the London Film Festival in November 1986. The film went into commercial release in February 1987.

== Reception ==
=== Box office ===
The film grossed £440,281 in the United Kingdom. Including its gross from the United States, the film grossed over $1 million.

=== Critical response ===
The movie received a mixed reception from critics. On the review aggregator website Rotten Tomatoes, 91% of 11 critics' reviews are positive.

Leslie Halliwell said: "Extended absurdity uncharacteristic of its director."

The Radio Times Guide to Films gave the film 2/5 stars, writing: "Both Amanda Donohoe and Oliver Reed cope well with their roles as the castaway and the sex-mad, middle-aged man who is her companion, but in the end you can't help feeling the nudity is only there to spice up a tale of two selfish people who probably deserved each other."

Variety wrote: "Newcomer Amanda Donohoe spends most of the pic displaying the absence of bikini marks on her body (palm trees always seem to obscure the vital parts of Oliver Reed as Gerald Kingsland), and she copes well with a character whose motives and methods for going to the tiny desert island remain dubious. Reed gives the performance of his career as a sexually frustrated middle-aged man in search of sun and sex, and is admirably complemented by Amanda Donohoe as the determined but fickle object of his lust. Photography is excellent (especially underwater scenes) but though Castaway is a great ad for the tropical Seychelles, it won’t be remembered as a Nicolas Roeg classic."
