= Lost in Blue (video game) =

2005 video game

- European cover art
- Developer: Konami Computer Entertainment Hawaii
- Publisher: Konami
- Director: Kazuhiko Takata
- Producer: Masahiro Ueno
- Programmers: Hideya Sugiyama; Kenji Yamamoto; Jeffrey Liao; Hawi Stecher
- Writer: Mari Yamaha
- Composer: Stephen Geering
- Series: Lost in Blue
- Platform: Nintendo DS
- Release: JP: August 25, 2005; NA: September 27, 2005; EU: November 11, 2005; AU: November 18, 2005
- Genre: Survival
- Mode: Single-player

Lost in Blue (known in Japan as Survival Kids: Lost in Blue) is a 2005 survival video game developed and published by Konami for the Nintendo DS. Lost in Blue follows two young teenagers, Keith and Skye, who struggle for survival on a deserted island. The player must learn to use the island's natural resources to create a makeshift home away from home. The sequel, Lost in Blue 2, was released two years later. A third installment of the series, Lost in Blue 3, was released on December 20, 2007 in Japan.

Due to an undershipment, the game was difficult to find in the months following its North American release.

== Gameplay ==
Lost in Blue's gameplay makes extensive use of the system's touchscreen and microphone features. In the fire building sequence, the player must alternate pressing of the L and R buttons in order to build enough friction on the wood, and then blow into the DS's microphone to successfully ignite the fire. If the player later gets a fire maker with bow, they can press L or R, and it will automatically fill up, allowing the player to blow into the microphone and finishing the fire. The touch screen interface is used for navigating menus, and the island can be explored and interacted with using either the touch screen or the standard control buttons.

The game's primary action takes place on the touch screen, while the top screen is used to display Keith and Skye's health, which is categorized by hunger, thirst, stamina, and hit points. If the thirst or energy categories hit zero, the character's hit points will begin to drop. It is also possible for other conditions, such as passing out due to lack of stamina, to occur. The player loses if either Keith or Skye runs out of hit points and dies. Players must multitask in micromanaging both characters' vital statistics while also exploring the island.

The game's primary protagonist is Keith, who must lead Skye around the island by hand due to her poor eyesight. Upon completing the game, a "Skye Mode" is unlocked which allows the player to play the entire game from Skye's perspective. In this mode, she can freely move about the island without assistance, although she is unable to climb as Keith can, severely limiting her range of travel.

== Story ==
Lost in Blue is not a linear game in its gameplay and its multiple endings provide a different story nearly every time one plays through it. The story advances through exploration of the island, which consists almost entirely of moving deeper inland into the island and uncovering its secrets. Some days may not be spent exploring and advancing the story but rather by just trying to survive by collecting food, building furniture, and so on.

The story begins with the protagonists riding on ship when a massive storm causes the vessel to sink. In the commotion, Skye manages to get on a liferaft while Keith plunges into the water, at which point he loses consciousness.

Keith wakes up on the beach of the south side of a deserted island. After exploring his surroundings, he finds shelter in a cave. The next day, Keith crosses a nearby river and finds Skye asleep next to her raft, which is apparently undamaged. After she wakes up, Keith and Skye meet for the first time, and she tells him that she can't see very well because she has lost her glasses. Keith offers to help her look for her glasses, but accidentally steps on them during the search. With Skye's vision severely impaired, she becomes dependent on Keith to guide her safely around the island.

The two return to the cave and make a home. In the following days, Keith enters a routine of leaving the cave to explore the island and gather food and supplies, and Skye helps by preparing meals. Keith also brings Skye along with him on occasion when he finds an area of the island that he can't traverse by himself.

During his explorations, Keith comes across some ancient ruins on the island that are clearly man-made and filled with various puzzles. Eventually making his way to the other end of the temple, he discovers that there are in fact other people on the island, but his joy turns to caution when he overhears a conversation between the two men discussing their orders to kill intruders. Keith decides to stealthily slip past them to try to use them to escape the island. Sneaking into the bandits' hideout, Keith discovers a ship and, after uncovering what information he can, returns to Skye.

When Keith returns to the bandits' hideout, he discovers that the guards have shaped up and are more vigilant. He also discovers a uniform that he can use as a disguise to sneak into the hideout. When the teens finally escape together, they end up in civilization again. The ending varies depending on Keith's relationship with Skye.

== Reception ==
Reception

Aggregate score
Aggregator	Score
Metacritic	69/100

Review scores
Publication	Score
1Up.com	B
Electronic Gaming Monthly	7.17/10
Eurogamer	6/10
Game Informer	7/10
GameSpot	7.3/10
GameSpy	2.5/5
GameZone	7/10
IGN	6.8/10
Nintendo Power	8/10
X-Play	2/5
Detroit Free Press	2/4

The game received "average" reviews according to video game review aggregator website Metacritic.
