= Castaway (book) =

1983 book by Lucy Irvine

- Author: Lucy Irvine
- Language: English
- Genre: Autobiography
- Publisher: Victor Gollancz Ltd
- Publication date: 1983
- ISBN: 0-575-03340-1

Castaway is a 1983 autobiographical book by Lucy Irvine about her year on the Australian tropical Torres Strait island of Tuin, having answered a want ad from writer Gerald Kingsland seeking a "wife" for a year in 1982. It was published by Victor Gollancz Ltd and was both a bestseller and a critical success. The book was the basis of the 1986 film Castaway, starring Oliver Reed as Gerald Kingsland and Amanda Donohoe as Irvine.

== Synopsis ==
In her book, Irvine starts with the somewhat odd circumstances of this collaboration, in which she addresses Kingsland's ad for a “wife to live on a lonely island for a year”. In that year (1982), Irvine was 25, and Kingsland 49. Irvine stated she longed for a “major personal challenge”. She also acknowledged she was taking chances, but as she was neither in a relationship nor had children, she felt it was worth taking. After being formally married—Tuin Island is part of Queensland and the authorities would not let them go without being married—and Irvine has an intrauterine device implanted to prevent pregnancy, Irvine and Kingsland try to adapt, making the best out of a beautiful but hostile environment with treacherous flora and fauna. Slowly but surely, an intense love-hate relationship develops between the two, as Irvine is much more strict and disciplined than the laid-back Kingsland. Kingsland also makes clear he desires the blonde, slender Irvine, but much to his chagrin, she refuses his advances. However, as they are mutually dependent on each other, and both are constantly hungry, the tension remains in check.

Matters grow worse when Kingsland's legs become infested with ulcers—it turns out he is allergic to the shark they are regularly eating—and the two are visited by two male naval postal officers who deliver a census form which the government insists they complete. When Irvine flirts with them, and acknowledges being sexually attracted by them, Kingsland is eaten up with jealousy and does not believe her insistence that she did not have sex with them. However, when she eats poisoned beans, he saves her life, which earns her respect. But things go from bad to worse when a drought comes over Tuin. Having no means of communication—the antenna of their CB radio set is missing—the two nearly starve to death. Irvine also has serious abdominal problems and fears she is pregnant.

Salvation comes in the form of natives from the neighbouring Badu Island, Queensland who find the castaways and nurture them, helped by occasionally passing nun nurses. Irvine and Kingsland regain their strength and health; Irvine's abdominal problems are due to inflammation caused by the IUD, not pregnancy. She has it extracted, and after recovering, the two are treated as honoured guests. They are invited to several tribal ceremonies and get a deep insight into their culture. Kingsland establishes himself as a fine addition because he is able to fix many of their technical and electrical devices. He thrives on his new usefulness, and Irvine finds herself courted by young Badu islanders, offers which she politely declines. Feeling proud of Kingsland, Irvine makes a fateful decision. Feeling her libido return and now willing to fulfil Kingsland his one wish she has denied him, she equips herself with condoms and offers herself to him. They start a fulfilling, but awkward, sexual relationship; both enjoy the new quality of their marriage, but Irvine makes clear that she will leave him at the end of the year, as they had planned. She feels that life has more to offer than being the wife of a castaway mechanic, and Kingsland reluctantly accepts, stating she is still too young to waste her dreams. They spend their last days together on Tuin Island, and when she flies away to the UK, Irvine feels both sadness and relief.

Years later, Irvine stated she liked Kingsland, but hated being forced to marry him because the Queensland government demanded it. She also stated that she would not do it again the same way, but it was an invaluable experience.

== Film ==
The book was the basis of the 1986 film Castaway, starring Amanda Donohoe as Irvine and Oliver Reed as Kingsland. When Irvine met director Nicolas Roeg, he felt her story was perfect material for telling a relationship between an older man and a younger woman. It never was intended to be exactly like her experience, as Roeg felt Irvine would be too personally involved then. Irvine was positive about the film, stating she was pleased with Donohoe, Reed and Roeg.
