= Gerald Kingsland =

British journalist (1930–2000)

Gerald W. Kingsland (8 March 1930 – 20 March 2000) was a journalist, adventurer, and writer, born and raised in Whitchurch, Buckinghamshire, England.

== Early life ==
After a stint in the British Army where he fought in combat during the Korean War in 1951, he became a successful journalist and publisher in England, then a wine grower in Italy.

== Lucy Irvine ==
In 1980 he set out to become a modern Robinson Crusoe seeking a remote tropical island where he could be self-sufficient together with a female companion. He advertised in Time Out magazine in 1980 for a woman to share life with him on a deserted island. When Kingsland was 49, he met 24-year-old Lucy Irvine. They went to Tuin Island, in the Torres Strait between Australia and Papua New Guinea, uninhabited and lacking a dependable water supply, where they nearly perished, but were saved by Badu Islanders. Kingsland and Irvine wrote separate accounts of their adventure. His book, The Islander, was published in 1984; Irvine's Castaway was published in 1983. The story was also depicted in the film Castaway (1986), in which Kingsland was portrayed by Oliver Reed and Irvine by Amanda Donohoe.

He was married to Lucy Irvine in 1981 as a condition for residency on Tuin Island; they soon separated.

== Personal life ==
He had five sons and two daughters from five marriages, including to writer Rosemary Kingsland.

After leaving his wife circa 1975, in 1978 Kingsland began the rest of his life hopping from one deserted island to another in the South Pacific, advertising in newspapers and magazines for suitable females to accompany him, but finding life in the South Pacific to be less than perfect.

Whilst living in Samoa, Kingsland was diagnosed with bowel cancer, returning to the UK in 2000. He died from a heart attack aged 70 in London. His ashes were scattered in a field on a farm near Bromyard.

His last wife, aged 27, and son, his seventh child, remained at their home in Samoa.

== Selected publications ==
- From the Whores of Montezuma. London: Gerald Kingsland Pub. 1972 (Korean War memories)
- The Islander. Sevenoaks, Kent: New English Library. 1984. ISBN 9780450060687. OCLC 12419338.
- The voyager: the further adventures of the man who wanted to be Robinson Crusoe, Sevenoaks, Kent: New English Library, 1987.
- Robinson Crusoe heute: Leben auf einsamer Insel, Pietsch, 1987.
- In quest of glory: Korean War memoirs, Sevenoaks, Kent: New English Library, 1989.
- Comfort for a Castaway. London: Gerald Kingsland Pub., 2000.

== See also ==
- Castaway (1983)
