= Lucy Irvine =

British adventurer and author (born 1956)

- Born: 1 February 1956 (age 70); Whitton, London, England
- Occupations: Adventurer; author
- Known for: Castaway (1983)

Lucy Irvine (born 1 February 1956) is a British adventurer and author. She is known for spending a year on the uninhabited island of Tuin and for her book, Castaway (1983), describing the experience.

== Early life ==
Born on 1 February 1956 in Whitton, London, Irvine is the younger daughter of Robert R. Irvine and his wife Lena Holloway, who was from Calver in Derbyshire. She has two siblings, an older sister and a younger brother. She later revealed that she had a tumultuous upbringing, developing a "habit of solitude" and confiding in her diary rather than people as a result of her family life. She repeatedly ran away from school and from home, maintaining this was not "because I was discontented, but because I found it interesting", and claiming "Not belonging to any particular group, I was free to observe. I drew word sketches of people's faces and actions. But I always kept a certain distance, and that habit has stuck." She had no full-time schooling after her thirteenth birthday.

Before writing Castaway, she had been employed as a charwoman, monkey keeper, waitress, stonemason's mate, life model, pastry cook, concierge, and Inland Revenue clerk.

== Books ==
In 1981, Irvine responded to an advert placed by writer Gerald Kingsland and they became intentional castaways for a year on the isolated and uninhabited island of Tuin, in the Torres Strait between New Guinea and Australia. In 1983, she published her account of the experience in Castaway, which was later used as the basis for the 1986 film of the same name. According to Irvine, the film, directed by Nicolas Roeg, is more about the relationship between an older man and a young woman than it is about her experiences on the island.

Following the success of Castaway, in 1985 she published Runaway about her life leading up to the decision to spend a year on Tuin. It describes how, while hitchhiking in Greece, she was raped at knife-point and subsequently suffered a mental breakdown.

She published her first novel One is One in 1989.

Irvine was approached by Diana Hepworth and her husband Tom to write their biography. In 1947, the two British expatriates had set sail from England and embarked upon a hazardous journey in search of a faraway paradise where they could raise a family. They had settled on Pigeon Island in the Solomons, running a trading business. Irvine accepted the invitation and in 1998 travelled to the Solomon Islands to immerse herself once again in island life. She was accompanied by her two youngest children and, after a year, returned to write Faraway.

== Personal life ==
Irvine was married to Gerald Kingsland in 1981, this being necessary to reside on Tuin, but they subsequently separated. On her return to Britain, she lived on the remote island of Tanera Mòr. In 1984, Irvine bought the isolated cottage Rumachroy, near Nairn in Scotland, where, most of the time as a single mother, she raised her three sons. In 2007, she moved to south-eastern Bulgaria; the "old mud-brick house" in which she lived at the foot of the Balkans was destroyed by fire in 2009; she now lives in a caravan on the site.

She is a member of Mensa (stating she "took a test and joined Mensa when [she] was 16") and The Chelsea Arts Club.

Irvine founded a registered non-profit animal rescue, LIFE (Lucy Irvine Foundation Europe), located in Bulgaria. LIFE works in the poorest regions, and with Roma. There is a website and also a Facebook page. Over 200 dogs have been successfully adopted to the UK, and LIFE routinely holds SpayAThons as well.

== Bibliography ==
- Irvine, Lucy (1983). Castaway. London: Victor Gollancz. ISBN 0-575-03340-1. OCLC 11371743.
- Irvine, Lucy (1987). Runaway. New York: Random House. ISBN 0-394-54510-9. OCLC 14002098.
- Irvine, Lucy (1990). One is One. London: Hodder & Stoughton.
- Irvine, Lucy (2000). Faraway. London: Doubleday. ISBN 0-385-60180-8. OCLC 44915500.
