= Amanda Donohoe =

British actress (born 1962)

- Born: 29 June 1962 (age 64); London, England
- Education: Royal Central School of Speech and Drama
- Occupation: Actress
- Years active: 1980–present
- Known for: The Lair of the White Worm (1988)

Amanda Donohoe (born 29 June 1962) is an English actress. She first came to public attention at age 16 for her relationship with pop singer Adam Ant, appearing in the music videos for the Adam and the Ants' singles "Antmusic" (1980) and "Stand and Deliver" (1981) during their four-year relationship. After making her film debut in Foreign Body (1986), she co-starred in Castaway with Oliver Reed and starred in two films by Ken Russell: The Lair of the White Worm (1988) and The Rainbow (1989).

Donohoe later moved to the United States, where she appeared in films and in television series, which included winning a Golden Globe for Best Supporting Actress during her two years (1990–1992) as C.J. Lamb on the NBC drama series L.A. Law. She also appeared in the series Frasier in the episode "Call Me Irresponsible". Other television roles include Natasha Wylde on the British soap opera Emmerdale (2009–2010). She has had numerous stage roles, including Yelena in a 1996 Broadway production of Uncle Vanya.

== Early life ==
Amanda Donohoe was born on 29 June 1962 in London, to Ted and Joanna Donohoe. She has an older sister, Cordelia. She is of Irish, Russian and Swiss ancestry. Her father worked for the Foreign and Commonwealth Office, which led to her family moving a great deal, with a base in London but also living for periods overseas. After her father's retirement, he joined her mother in her antiques-dealing business.

Donohoe was educated at the Francis Holland School. When 15 years old, she met Adam Ant (Stuart Goddard) and a year later, she left her parents' home and moved in with Ant in Notting Hill. In October 1980, she accompanied Ant to the recording of the Top of the Pops (TOTP) performance of "Dog Eat Dog." Afterwards, in an incident in the BBC corridors, she personally stepped in to physically defend Ant from an assault by rival band 4" Be 2" who were also on the premises.

In 1981, Donohoe appeared in the promotional videos for the songs "Antmusic" and "Stand and Deliver" by Adam and the Ants, which were screened on TV when the band was at the height of its fame. Shortly before the band began its 1981 world tour, Donohoe was offered a place at the Royal Central School of Speech and Drama, which she accepted.

== Career ==
After graduation, Donohoe came to the attention of worldwide audiences in 1986 when she was cast to co-star with Oliver Reed as Lucy Irvine in Castaway. She followed this with roles in two Ken Russell films, The Lair of the White Worm (1988) and The Rainbow (1989).

After moving to Los Angeles in 1990, Donohoe made her debut on television in the role of lawyer Cara Jean "C.J." Lamb on the American legal drama television series L.A. Law in which she appeared during the fifth and sixth seasons of the series. In February 1991, she took part in the first of the so-called "lesbian kiss episodes" on American television when her character privately kissed fellow lawyer Abby Perkins, played by Michele Greene. Some of her other television roles include Louise Stoke in Series 8 of Bad Girls and a guest appearance in Ally McBeal. She had a major supporting role in the comedy film Liar Liar (1997), starring Jim Carrey.

Donohoe made her Broadway debut in a 1995 production of Uncle Vanya, at the Circle in the Square Theatre. She returned to the UK to play Mrs. Robinson in a 2001 stage production of The Graduate.

After moving back to the UK in the early 2000s, Donohoe took the role of DI Susan Alembic in the crime drama Murder City (2004–2006). In 2009 she joined the cast of ITV soap opera Emmerdale as businesswoman Natasha Wylde. Donohoe played the character until leaving the series in November 2010. On 18 and 19 February 2010, she was a guest panelist on Loose Women. She has also lent her voice to the Activision PC video game Santa Fe Mysteries: The Elk Moon Murder as Karen Gordon.

== Personal life ==
A socialist and feminist, Donohoe said in a Q&A with The Guardian in 2001 that she was categorically opposed to the death penalty, supported the monarchy, and would vote for the Labour Party in the general election of that year. Donohoe considered smoking cigarettes to be her most unappealing habit, and said she cooked and drank good red wine to relax.

== Filmography ==
=== Film ===
| Year | Title | Role | Notes |
|---|---|---|---|
| 1986 | Foreign Body | Susan Partridge | |
| 1986 | Castaway | Lucy Irvine | |
| 1988 | The Lair of the White Worm | Lady Sylvia Marsh | |
| 1989 | The Rainbow | Winifred Inger | |
| 1989 | Diamond Skulls | Ginny Bruckton | |
| 1989 | Tank Malling | Helen Searle | |
| 1990 | Paper Mask | Christine Taylor | |
| 1994 | The Madness of King George | Lady Pembroke | |
| 1997 | Liar Liar | Miranda | |
| 1997 | One Night Stand | Margaux | |
| 1998 | The Real Howard Spitz | Laura Kershaw | |
| 1998 | I'm Losing You | Mona Deware | |
| 1998 | Stardust | Christine Wasacz | |
| 2000 | Circus | Gloria | |
| 2000 | Wild About Harry | Ruth McKee | |
| 2001 | Phoenix Blue | Persha Lovich | |
| 2008 | Starship Troopers 3: Marauder | Admiral Enolo Phid | |
| 2009 | The Calling | Trish | |
| 2011 | The Last Belle | Siobhan (voice) | Short film |
| 2013 | Trafficker | Alison Reid | |
| 2018 | Blue Iguana | Dawn Bradshaw | |
| 2021 | The Princess Switch 3: Romancing the Star | Bianca Pembroke | |

=== Television ===
| Year | Title | Role | Notes |
|---|---|---|---|
| 1988 | An Affair in Mind | Drusilla Janus | TV film |
| 1988 | Les Girls | Camilla | Episode: "Tarts" |
| 1988 | Game, Set and Match | Gloria Kent | Regular role |
| 1990–1992 | L.A. Law | Cara Jean 'C.J.' Lamb | Main role |
| 1991 | Screen Two | Jane Clemant | Episode: "The Laughter of God" |
| 1992 | Shame | Diana Cadell | TV film |
| 1993 | It's Nothing Personal | Katherine Whitloff | TV film |
| 1993 | Briefest Encounter | Siobhan | TV film |
| 1993 | The Hidden Room | Martha | Episode: "Dangerous Dreams" |
| 1993 | The Substitute | Gayle Richards / Laura Ellington | TV film |
| 1993 | Frasier | Catherine | Episode: "Call Me Irresponsible" |
| 1993 | A Woman's Guide to Adultery | Jo | 3 episodes |
| 1994 | Murder Most Horrid | Carmela Vezza | Episode: "Overkill" |
| 1995 | Shame II: The Secret | Diana Cadell | TV film |
| 1996 | The Thorn Birds: The Missing Years | Meggie Cleary O'Neill | TV film |
| 1996 | Deep Secrets | Lara | TV film |
| 1998 | A Knight in Camelot | Queen Guinevere | TV film |
| 1999 | Batman Beyond | Donna Walker / Queen | Voice, episode: "Dead Man's Hand" |
| 2000 | Ally McBeal | Marianne Holt | Episode: "I Will Survive" |
| 2000 | In the Beginning | Zuleika | TV miniseries |
| 2001 | The Atlantis Conspiracy | Lauren Marcus | TV film |
| 2001 | The Legend of Tarzan | Lady Waltham | Voice, episode: "Tarzan and the Gauntlet of Vengeance" |
| 2002 | Lucky Day | Nora Barkin | TV film |
| 2004–2006 | Murder City | DI Susan Alembic | Main role |
| 2006 | Bad Girls | Lou Stoke | Main role |
| 2009–2010 | Emmerdale | Natasha Wylde | Regular role |
| 2013 | Toast of London | Ellen | Episode: "Vanity Project" |
| 2013 | Air Force One Is Down | Gillian Berry | TV miniseries |
| 2014 | Pramface | Sally | 2 episodes |
| 2014 | Toast of London | Ellen | Episode: "Buried Alive" |

=== Stage ===
| Year | Title | Role | Notes |
|---|---|---|---|
| 1984 | Cymbeline | Helen | |
| 1984 | Great Expectations | Estella | Royal Exchange, Manchester |
| 1984 | The Admirable Crichton | Lady Catherine | Royal Exchange, Manchester |
| 1995 | Uncle Vanya | Yelena Andreyevna | Circle in the Square Theatre |
| 1996 | Miss Julie | Miss Julie | Royal Exchange, Manchester |
| 1997–1998 | HRH | Wallis Simpson | UK tour |
| 2001 | The Graduate | Mrs. Robinson | |
| 2001 | Hedda Gabler | Hedda | Royal Exchange, Manchester |
| 2002 | Teeth 'n' Smiles | Maggie | Sheffield Theatres |
| 2011 | Star Quality | Lorraine | UK tour |

== Awards and nominations ==
In 1990, Donohoe was nominated for the Saturn Award for Best Actress for her performance in Ken Russell's The Lair of the White Worm (1988), and, in 1992, won the Golden Globe Award for Best Supporting Actress in a Series, Miniseries or Television Film for her role as Cara Jean 'C.J.' Lamb in L.A. Law.
