= Lost in Blue: Shipwrecked =

2008 video game

- North American packaging artwork
- Developer: Hudson Soft
- Publisher: Konami
- Directors: Sayoko Yamada; Osamu Kunimasa
- Producer: Hitoshi Kimoto
- Writer: Yoshitaka Emoto
- Platform: Wii
- Release: JP: August 7, 2008; NA: September 23, 2008; EU: December 4, 2008
- Genre: Survival
- Modes: Single-player, multiplayer

Lost in Blue: Shipwrecked is a survival game developed by Hudson Soft and published by Konami for the Wii video game console. It was first released in Japan, and was later released in North America in 2008.

== Story ==
Teenager Aidan and his pet monkey Hobo are on a cruise ship, which starts to sink. Aidan gets onto a lifeboat with Hobo. The lifeboat dashes away, but soon comes to a stop. The pilot announces that the propeller is stuck, and Aidan volunteers to go and free it. The boat shakes and Aidan is thrown into the current with Hobo. As Aidan drifts away, a man on the lifeboat tosses him a suitcase. Aidan grabs the suitcase, while Hobo hops on. Soon, Aidan wakes up on an island. He explores it until he sees a larger island in the distance. He builds a raft out of the suitcase and some driftwood. He and Hobo sail over to the larger island. The raft breaks apart as he reaches the island, and all his belongings float away. Upon arrival, the two are greeted by a teenage girl named Lucy and her dog Max. They band together and start to explore the island.

== Reception ==
Reception

Aggregate score
Aggregator	Score
Metacritic	54/100

Review scores
Publication	Score
1Up.com	C
Famitsu	25/40
GamePro	2.5/5
GameSpot	4.5/10
GamesRadar+	3/5
GameTrailers	5.4/10
IGN	5/10
NGamer	46%
Nintendo Power	6.5/10

Lost in Blue: Shipwrecked received "mixed" reviews according to video game review aggregator website Metacritic. In Japan, Famitsu gave it a score of two sevens, one six, and one five for a total of 25 out of 40.
