= Lost in Blue 2 =

2007 video game

- Developer: Matrix Software
- Publisher: Konami
- Director: Yukio Umematsu
- Producer: Hitoshi Kimoto
- Programmers: Yuichi Ono; Yurie Inoue; Takahiro Yonejima; Yuichi Yoshida; Yusuke Asai; Shinnosuke Ohashi; Yasuhiro Kanda; Michishito Ishizuka
- Composers: Norihiro Furukawa; Yousuke Yasui
- Platform: Nintendo DS
- Release: JP: March 15, 2007; NA: March 20, 2007; AU: April 20, 2007; EU: May 11, 2007
- Genre: Survival
- Modes: Single-player, multiplayer

Lost in Blue 2 (known in Japan as Survival Kids: Lost in Blue 2) is a survival game developed by Matrix Software and published by Konami for the Nintendo DS handheld video game console. It is the sequel to Lost in Blue and was followed by Lost in Blue 3.

== Story ==
The main characters are Jack and Amy, two young teenagers who have been shipwrecked on a deserted island. The player chooses to be either Jack, the boy character, or Amy, the girl character. The player takes on most of the responsibilities of the camp, but they are able to request favors of their partner, such as cooking, making rope from vines, or collecting firewood. Each character has special skills, e.g., Jack is able to climb twice as high as his female companion, is better at cooking food, and is a stronger fighter. On the other hand, Amy is a better swimmer, can find food more easily, and has a steadier aim with ranged weapons when hunting animals.

== Gameplay ==
The entire game can be played with the touch screen, or a combination of buttons and the touch screen. The bottom screen shows an isometric view of the area as the player moves their character around the environment. It is also used in minigames for cooking, hunting, making furniture, fishing, shaking trees, and digging in the dirt, and other tasks.

The top screen has three display modes. Mode one displays the overall health of both characters. This is shown by a total of four gauges. Three of them display stamina, hunger, and thirst. When one or more of those three reaches 0%, a health gauge begins to deplete which will result in that character's death upon reaching 0%. Mode two displays the map of the character's current location and includes the locations of both characters. Mode three is a picture of the island covered in fog, and the more the island is explored, the more the fog disappears until the whole island is revealed.

== Plot ==
A short cut scene plays, showing the player character on a sinking ship. The player has the option to search their suitcase, the closet, or the table. They gain something from choosing one of them, but it can sometimes be unclear what. After the cut scene, the character (Amy or Jack, depending whom the player chooses at the start of the game) wakes up on the beach. This part is similar to a cut scene in that the characters on the screen are moving and speaking without the player's control, but is illustrated just like the actual game, not like the cell-shaded opening. These "auto-scenes" occur whenever they hit an important turning point in the game. The character says that they should look for survivors. At this point, game play begins and the player is free to wander the beach. At a certain point, they will be near enough to the partner character, and an auto-scene will introduce the two of them.

Their first goals are to find food, shelter, and water. Once they find shelter in a nearby cave, the next few days are spent gathering enough food, water, and firewood to survive each day's labors. After several days of gameplay, the character will be able to start exploring their surroundings and finding the different areas of the island. Along the journey the character will fish, hunt game, build furniture, build a treehouse, develop several different tools, explore myriad cooking methods, and gather items from the beach, jungle, forest, and grasslands. They must also fight/avoid enemies like wolves, snakes, spiders, tigers, crocodiles, and gorillas. The eventual goal is, of course, rescue.

The game provides several different ending scenarios that depend upon the actions the character takes during the game, such as being saved by a helicopter. If the character's health meter reaches zero, they will die and the game will be over. However, there are several ways to get rescued, such as by radio or helicopter, and there is a 365-day limit to the game. If the characters make it 365 days, the game automatically ends, and they are still on the island, but they will win and survive.

== Reception ==
Reception

Aggregate score
Aggregator	Score
Metacritic	58/100

Review scores
Publication	Score
Edge	5/10
Electronic Gaming Monthly	5/10
Eurogamer	7/10
Game Informer	6.5/10
GamePro	1.5/5
GameSpot	6.2/10
GameSpy	2/5
GameTrailers	6.8/10
GameZone	5.7/10
IGN	5.5/10
Nintendo Power	5/10
411Mania	5.1/10

The game received "mixed" reviews according to video game review aggregator website Metacritic.
