= Lost in Blue 3 =

2007 video game

- Developer: Matrix Software
- Publisher: Konami
- Directors: Kieko Taga; Ayrano Fujiwara
- Producer: Hitoshi Kimoto
- Designer: Yuichiro Takahashi
- Programmer: Yuichi Ono
- Artist: Hiroyuki Sasaki
- Writers: Hiroaki Iwahara; Yasuhiro Matsumoto
- Composer: Stephen Geering
- Platform: Nintendo DS
- Release: JP: December 20, 2007; NA: March 18, 2008; EU: February 6, 2009
- Genre: Survival
- Modes: Single-player, multiplayer

Lost in Blue 3 (original title: Survival Kids: 小さな島の大きな秘密!?, directly translates to "Survival Kids: The Big Secret of the Small Island!?") is a survival game developed by Matrix Software and published by Konami for the Nintendo DS handheld video game console. It is the sequel to Lost in Blue 2. It was released on December 20, 2007, in Japan with the North American version released on March 18, 2008.

== Story ==
A luxury passenger line is lost at sea. Two survivors, a young man and a young woman, are washed ashore on a deserted island. The shock of the accident robs the boy of all his memories.

Believing that they will soon be rescued, they begin their new survival adventure, but no help comes. As they explore the island, they encounter one strange incident after another.

== Gameplay ==
At the beginning of Lost in Blue 3, the player can choose to play as either Eric (called "Sam" by Claire) or Claire. They each have their advantages and disadvantages. Their goal is to survive on the island. This is done by finding food, water, shelter and a means for starting a fire. The player can unlock two additional characters who can help them with chores such as hunting, gathering water, firewood or making ropes or baskets. As they explore the island, they will find items that will make it easier to survive. When the character has new team members, they will notice that smaller amounts of food will fill up their hunger meters more quickly. They will find new locations to call home, but their furniture will not automatically transfer; they must build new furniture there. Also, if the player is Claire or brings her with them, they can unlock mini-games in which they can befriend the chimpanzee and dolphin. The ultimate goal is to escape the island.

== Characters ==
At the beginning of the game, the player is given the option to play as one of two characters. After the player completes the game, they are given the option to play the game as any of the four characters.

Claire: A 17-year-old blonde-haired white girl. She was brought on board the ship to sing at the evening dinner party. She's cheerful, energetic and curious, but not much of an athlete. She is reunited with her boyfriend on the island, but not everything goes as she hoped it would.

Eric: A 17-year-old brown haired white boy. He doesn't remember his name, but the girl he meets on the island calls him "Sam", so that's what he goes by. A cautious young man, he knows a lot about living in the wild.

Kumiko: A 13-year-old Asian girl. A girl-genius, she knows everything there is to know about science and machines. A quiet, cool type, she is also a wiz in the kitchen. It seems that she came to this island of her own choice.

James: A 15-year-old black boy. A boy with a strong sense of justice and fair play. He's an accomplished martial artist who has won many tournaments. Just before the luxury liner sank, he witnessed a suspicious incident.

== Reception ==
Reception

Aggregate score
| Aggregator | Score |
|---|---|
| Metacritic | 59/100 |

Review scores
| Publication | Score |
|---|---|
| 1Up.com | B− |
| Electronic Gaming Monthly | 5/10 |
| Eurogamer | 7/10 |
| Game Informer | 5.75/10 |
| GamesMaster | 59% |
| GameSpot | 5.5/10 |
| GameTrailers | 5.8/10 |
| GameZone | 5.9/10 |
| IGN | 5.5/10 |
| Nintendo Power | 5.5/10 |

The game received "mixed" reviews according to video game review aggregator website Metacritic.
