= On a Wound by Premeditation =

On a Wound by Premeditation is a speech by the ancient Greek orator and speechwriter Lysias.

== Lysias ==
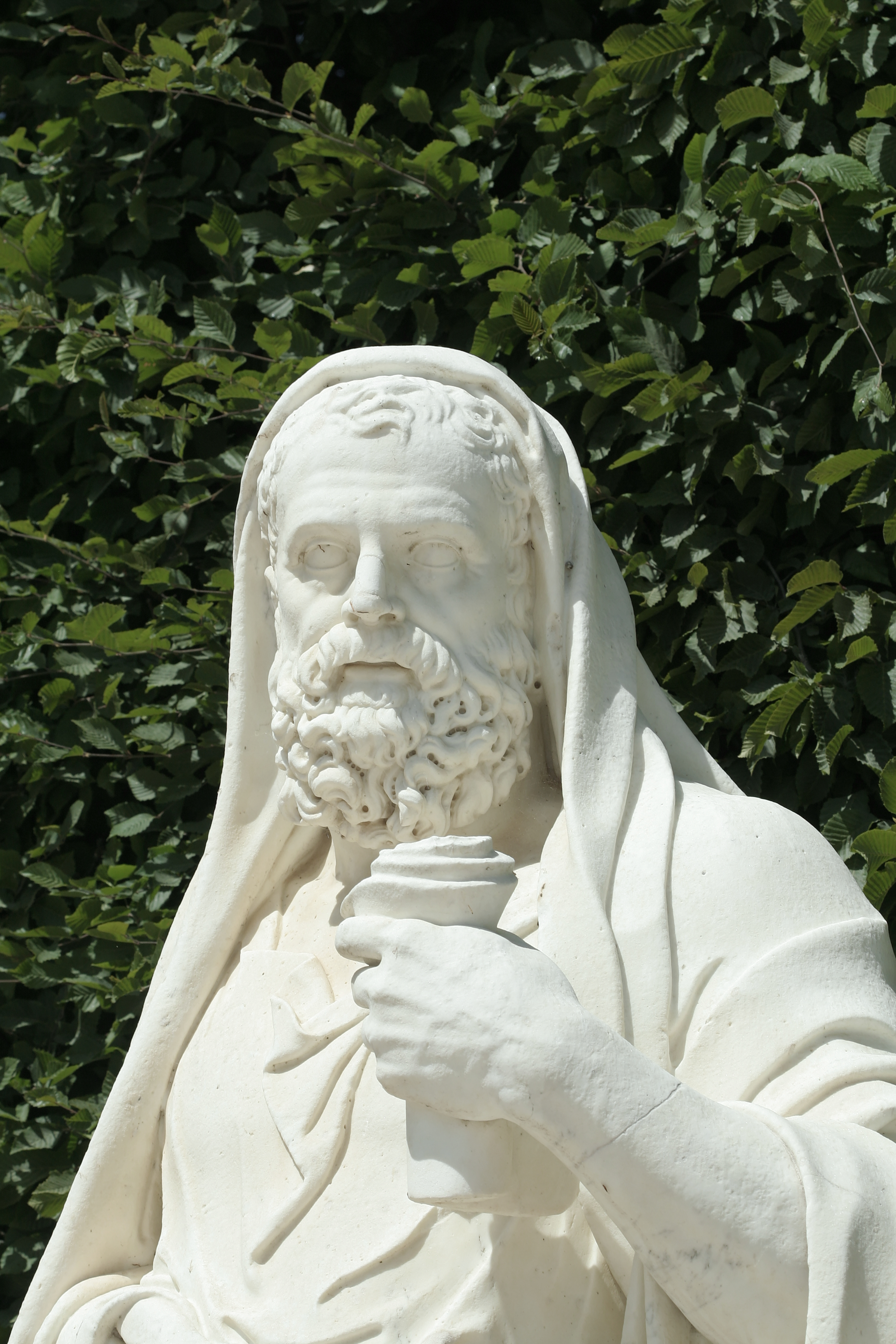
Lysias, by Jean Dedieu (c.1645 – 31 May 1727)

Lysias is one of the "Canon of Ten" Attic orators He is known for being a Greek professional speech writer. He was born in 445 B.C. and died around 380 B.C. Lysias was the son of Cephalus, who was a wealthy man who settled in Athens. When Lysias came back to Athens in 414 B.C, it is believed that he taught rhetoric, which is considered the art of persuasion, or discourse. In 404, there were thirty tyrants, who were issued to govern the city of Athens, and they decided to seize Lysias and his brother, Polemarchus, as aliens. Polemarchus died, but lysias escaped to Megara. While Athena was on its way back to democracy, he returned and started to write speeches for litigants.

It is said that Lysias actually really enjoyed writing these speeches. He wanted to assure that he could serve his clients in the best way. He knew that he was good at efficiently and eloquently getting the message across. With this understanding of his skill, he had a desire to make his clients, who entrusted him with their cases, to sound intelligent when talking in court.

== Works ==
Lysias is known to be a literary artist. It has been said that his writing is original, vivid, clear, simple, and almost humorous. Lysias wrote a total of thirty-four speeches in his lifetime. There are some speeches that he would have to orally present, however, a lot of them did tend to be written for others.

"On a Wound by Premeditation" is one of many of his speeches. We do not have the entire speech and date is uncertain. This speech and "Against Simon" go hand in hand, as they are both about older men and their relationship with their younger beloved. "On a Wound by Premeditation" is specifically dispute over sexual favors of a slave girl. This speech was most likely orally read at the Areopagus, which cases like arson, wounding with intent to kill, and homicide would be tried.

Perseus Digital Library has a copyright free translation of this whole speech by W.R.M Lamb.

== Sources ==
1. Carey, Christopher. Trials from Classical Athens. New York: Routledge, 1997. (ISBN 978-0415107617)
2. Todd, S.C. Lysias (The Oratory of Classical Greece). Austin: University of Texas Press, 2000. (ISBN 978-0292781665)
3. Lamb, W.R.M. Lysias (Loeb Classical Library No. 244). Cambridge: Harvard University Press, 1930. (ISBN 978-0-674-99269-6)
