= Against Eratosthenes =

Oration by Lysias (403 BC)

"Against Eratosthenes" is a speech by Lysias, one of the ten Attic orators. In the speech, Lysias accuses Eratosthenes, a member of the Thirty Tyrants who ruled Athens following the Peloponnesian War, of the murder of his brother, Polemarchus (around 403 BCE).

== Overview ==
Lysias's career as a speech writer, or logographer, was interrupted by the occupation of the Thirty Tyrants, an oligarchic junta placed in power by the Spartans following their victory against Athens in the Peloponnesian War, which ended in 404 BCE. Lysias, along with a small group of fellow metics, including his brother, Polemarchus, were arrested by the pro-Spartan regime on charges of general hostility and resistance to the Thirty Tyrants. According to Lysias, the group was arrested on trumped up charges just so the Thirty Tyrants could have a reason to confiscate their substantial wealth and property. The subsequent execution of Polemarchus is one of the subjects of the speech. Eratosthenes was a member of the Thirty Tyrants who oversaw the arrest of Lysias, Polemarchus, and their fellow metics. The speech was written following the collapse of the oligarchy and the restoration of democracy in Athens in 403 BCE.

== Lysias's speech ==
Lysias is both the author and the speaker in the speech, which is considered to be among the most famous of his works. Upon the restoration of democracy in Athens, a general amnesty was granted to protect the former members of the oligarchy. This amnesty meant that the officials of the oligarchic government were protected from prosecution from acts they committed before the democratic government was restored except in cases where they personally committed a murder. The members of the Thirty Tyrants were not granted amnesty until they successfully defended themselves at their euthunai, a process in which government officials account for their actions that took place during their terms.

It is unclear whether this speech was delivered at Eratosthenes's euthunai, at a separate homicide trial, or at all. Regardless of when or in what form the speech took place, Lysias's argument consists of two distinct sections: a general attack on Eratosthenes and the other members of the Thirty Tyrants pointing out their collective corruption before and after the pro-Spartan regime was installed and a cross-examination of Eratosthenes himself. Eratosthenes maintained that he was simply following the orders of his superiors and that he personally did not command much authority.

== Uncertain outcome ==
Unfortunately, no evidence exists for the outcome of the trial, or, again, for whether the speech was ever actually delivered. As a non-citizen, Lysias would not have been able to deliver the speech himself in court. Some scholars believe that Lysias wrote the speech hypothetically and circulated it in a pamphlet just to voice his opinions on the matter.

It is also suggested, however, that Lysias was granted citizenship by the democracy for a period after the 30 were expelled, in which case he could have delivered his own speech in the court.

== Bibliography ==
- Lysias, trans. S. C. Todd. Austin: University of Texas Press, 2000. ISBN 0-292-78166-0
