= Olympic Oration =

Olympic Oration or Olympian Oration may refer to:

- Olympic Oration, a mostly lost speech by Gorgias
- Olympic Oration (Lysias), Oration 33 by Lysias
- Olympic Oration or On Man's First Conception of God, Oration 12 by Dio Chrysostom
