= Cephalus =

Ancient Greek name

Cephalus or Kephalos (/ˈsɛfələs/; Ancient Greek: Κέφαλος) is an ancient Greek masculine name. The name is connected with the Greek word κεφαλή (kephalē), meaning "head".

The name was borne by several figures in Greek mythology, most notably the husband of Procris and the beloved of Eos, and by a number of historical figures in classical antiquity.

== Mythological figures ==
Several mythological figures are named Cephalus:

- Cephalus, son of Hermes and Herse. In Pseudo-Apollodorus, Herse bears Cephalus to Hermes.
- Cephalus, son of Deioneus, husband of Procris and beloved of Eos.

The myth of Cephalus and Procris was especially well known in ancient and later literature. In one common version, Cephalus accidentally kills Procris with a hunting spear after a sequence of suspicion, disguise and misunderstanding.

== Historical figures ==
The name was also borne by several historical figures:

- Cephalus of Syracuse, son of Lysanias, a wealthy metic and arms manufacturer living in Athens. He appears as an elderly interlocutor of Socrates in the opening book of Plato's Republic. He was the father of the orator Lysias, the philosopher Polemarchus, and Euthydemus.
- Cephalus, an Athenian orator who flourished after the time of the Thirty Tyrants.
- Cephalus, a Molossian who supported Perseus of Macedon during the Third Macedonian War.

== Etymological use ==
The Greek root κεφαλ- is also found in scientific and taxonomic terms derived from Greek, especially words referring to the head or head-like structures.

== See also ==
- List of commonly used taxonomic affixes
- Cephalo-
- Cephalonia

== Sources ==
- Gaius Julius Hyginus, Fabulae from The Myths of Hyginus, translated and edited by Mary Grant. University of Kansas Publications in Humanistic Studies. Online version at the ToposText Project.
- Pseudo-Apollodorus, The Library, translated by Sir James George Frazer. Cambridge, Massachusetts: Harvard University Press; London: William Heinemann, 1921. ISBN 0-674-99135-4. Online version at the Perseus Digital Library.
- William Smith, ed. Dictionary of Greek and Roman Biography and Mythology. London: John Murray, 1870.
