= Epicrates of Athens =

Several 4th century BCE Athenians

Epicrates (Epikratês; Greek: Επικράτης) was the name of several Athenians who lived during the 4th century BCE. Scholars have had difficulties distinguishing them, since their patronymics and demotics (deme designations) were not always recorded in ancient sources. This challenged ancient Greek authors themselves, such as the grammarian Harpocration. This article includes information regarding four individuals with the name that have been discerned from surviving texts.

== Epicrates of the deme Cephisia ==
This man was identified by Demosthenes as “an honest, useful, and popular politician, and one of the men who marched from Peiraeus and restored the democracy”. This was in 403 BCE when Athens was under the rule of the Thirty Tyrants. Epicrates was among those who joined Thrasybulus at Phyle, marched to Peiraeus, fought a street battle with the supporters of the Thirty, and later participated in the restoration of the democratic government.

In 396, the Persian King Artaxerxes sent Timocrates of Rhodes to several cities in Greece to bribe officials to stir up a war against Sparta. At the time, a Spartan force led by Agesilaus was attacking Persians cities in western Anatolia (Asia Minor, present day Turkey) and this was an effort to distract them. At Athens, those who met with Timocrates and took his money were Epicrates and Cephalus. Thebes, Corinth, and Argos were also approached and within a year these four cities were at war with Sparta (the Corinthian War, 395-387). Agesilaus and his force were soon recalled to aid with the fighting.

In 392, with the war in full swing and the Persians continuing to aid the allied cities, Sparta sent an embassy to Sardis to meet with the Persian satrap Tiribazus. Hearing of it, Athens, Thebes and Argos sent their own representatives. When the satrap announced the terms that he and the Spartans had settled on, the others demurred, each city for its own reasons, and the conference broke up without an agreement. Sparta later called them to a second conference at Sparta to make a second attempt at a deal. Epicrates of Cephisia, Andocides of Cydathenaeon, Kratinos of Sphettos, and Eubulides of Eleusis were the delegates to this meeting; it is unknown if they had been in attendance at Sardis.

The terms of this proposal were more favorable to Athens and the delegates returned home to recommend that the Athenians ratify the treaty. The Assembly rejected it, however, ostensibly because it did not protect the Greek cities of Anatolia from Persian interference. The four ambassadors were charged with failing to properly discharge their duties and condemned to death. Rather than submit to the punishment, they all went into exile.

== Epicrates Sakesphoros (shield-bearer) ==
So named because of his long beard, which covered his chest. He was lampooned by Aristophanes in Ecclesiazousai (line 71) and a scholiast to this passage described him as “a rhetorician and a demagogue, who nourished a long thick beard, and was satirized by Plato the comic writer under the name of Σακεσφορος”.

This Epicrates was identified by both Plutarch and Athenaeus as being part of an embassy to the Persian King in 367, where he received gifts from the King along with one of the leaders of the delegation, Timagoras. Timagoras was later tried for taking bribes and executed. Epicrates escaped prosecution but was said to have jokingly proposed a decree “that instead of nine archons, nine ambassadors to the King should be elected annually from the poor and needy citizens, in order that they might take his gifts and be wealthy men, whereat the people only laughed”. In another place, Athenaeus quoted Plato's Ambassadors:

Epicrates and his good friend Phormisius,

Received many and magnificent gifts

From the great king; a golden cruet-stand,

And silver plates and dishes.

The orator and logographer Lysias wrote a prosecution speech Against Epicrates for a trial where Epicrates was accused of taking bribes. It is unclear whether the man in the dock was Epicrates Cephisia, Epicrates Sakesphoros, or one of the other ‘Epicrates’ living at that time. It would not have been for Epicrates "Sakesphoros"’ activities in 367, as Lysias died in 380. It is also questionable whether it concerned Epicrates of Cephisia, since Demosthenes did not reference an accusation of bribery – rather that Epicrates and his colleagues “conducted the embassy contrary to written instructions”. Unfortunately, Lysias’ composition was not the main prosecution oration and had little in the way of specifics about the alleged crime.

== Epicrates Kyrebion (bran merchant) ==
The son-in-law of the orator Aeschines: the brother of his wife and son of Philodemus. In On the Embassy in 343, Demosthenes demeaned him with this nickname, calling him abominable and accusing him of failing to hide his face during a Dionysiac procession where participants were supposed to wear masks, thus shaming himself. Aeschines, replied in his rebuttal:

You try to turn the obliging nature of Epicrates into a subject for abuse. And who has ever seen him misbehaving either in daylight, as you allege, in the procession for the Dionysia, or at night? For you cannot claim that nobody noticed; he was too well known.

The translator of this passage, Chris Carey, has suggested that the Greek translated as “obliging nature” (euagogia) literally means “easily led”, which suggests to him “that Epicrates was a weak character, and the allegation may contain some truth”. The term actually means “good training” or “good education”. In some contexts it connotes “easily led” (Plato’s Republic, book vi, 586d) or “easily guided” (Aristotle's Politics, vii.7, 1327b). In both of these instances, however, the connotation is positive – that the person is “trainable” with respect to the character traits most beneficial to society. This also seems to be the inflection Aeschines puts on the term. It is unlikely he would have agreed with Carey's insinuation that Epicrates was “weak willed” or “easily led (astray)”.

== Epicrates of Pallene ==
There are several references to a man with this demotic. Tying them together is a matter of speculation. If they are, indeed, the same person, this much is known:

- He was the author of a law concerning ephebes in c. 336/5.
- He was allegedly worth 600 talents (an enormous sum).
- He was a syntrierarch on a ship called Aglaia Epgenous sometime in the 356-346 period.
- He was a member of the Boule (Council of 500) in 335/4.
- He owned land in the mining region of Attica.
- He was unsuccessfully prosecuted by the Athenian politician and orator Lysander between 330 and 326 for illegal mining, in which he was alleged to have made a profit of 300 talents in three years.
