= William Wyse =

British classical scholar (1860–1929)

William Wyse (19 March 1860 – 29 November 1929) was a classical scholar, noted for his work on the Attic orator Isaeus, and a benefactor of the University of Cambridge.

== Life ==
Wyse was born in Stratford, London. After education at the King Edward VI School, Stratford-upon-Avon and as a scholar at King's School, Canterbury he graduated with first class honours in the Classical Tripos at Trinity College, Cambridge, in 1882, being placed fourth in class. He won the Browne Scholarship and Powis Medal in 1880 and the Waddington Scholarship in 1881. He was elected a member of the Apostles on 1 May 1880. After graduation he submitted a dissertation on Aristotle's Politics to become a fellow of Trinity before becoming a tutor at the London firm of Wren and Gurney. In 1892 University College, London split its previously combined chair in Greek and Latin, awarding the new chair in Greek to Wyse and in Latin to A. E. Housman. The position did not last long, however, as, disillusioned by the low calibre of his students, Wyse resigned in 1894 and resumed his fellowship at Trinity.

The classical scholars J. E. B. Mayor and J. E. Sandys spoke in high regard of Wyse's criticism of the newly discovered treatise by Aristotle on the Constitution of Athens which (in Sandy's words) "give abundant proof not only of his acumen as a textual critic, but also of profound acquaintance with Greek History and Constitutional Antiquities."

In 1904, the year of his retirement from Trinity due to ill health, Wyse published his magnum opus, a Greek text and commentary on the speeches of Isaeus. Wyse rated Isaeus as "an unscrupulous falsifier of law and fact in the service of clients whose claims to the estates they contested were, without exception, fraudulent"; this view is, however, increasingly viewed as unjust by more modern scholars.

Wyse died in Halford, aged 89. On his death he endowed the William Wyse fund, which was used in part to endow the new chair, named in honour of Wyse, in social anthropology at Cambridge in 1932.
