= Leon of Salamis =

5th-century BC Athenian commander

Leon of Salamis (/ˈliːɒn, -ən/; Ancient Greek: Λέων) was a historical figure, mentioned in Plato's Apology, Xenophon's Hellenica and Andocides' On the Mysteries (1.94). This Leon may also be the renowned Athenian general Leon of the Peloponnesian War.

== Plato's and Xenophon's Leon ==
As part of the Hellenica, the historian Xenophon describes the reign over Athens of the Thirty Tyrants, a ruthless oligarchy under the control of Sparta, Athens' Hellenic rival. Xenophon lists some of the atrocities committed by the Thirty, including "when Leon of Salamis, a man of high and well-deserved reputation, was put to death, though he had not committed the shadow of a crime" (Hellenica Book II).

In the Apology, Plato's Socrates argues that he fears committing injustice more than he fears death. In support of that claim, he cites two incidents in which he, at great personal risk, disobeyed unjust commands of the Athenian government. One of those orders was for him to arrest Leon of Salamis and bring him to the Thirty for execution:

When the oligarchy was established, the Thirty summoned me to the Hall, along with four others, and ordered us to bring Leon from Salamis, that he might be executed. They gave many other orders to many people, in order to implicate as many as possible in their [i.e., the Thirty's] guilt. Then I showed again, not in words but in action, that, if it's not crude of me to say so, death is something I couldn't care less about, but that my whole concern is not to do anything unjust or impious. That government, as powerful as it was, did not frighten me into any wrongdoing. When we left the Hall, the other four went to Salamis and brought in Leon, but I went home. I might have been put to death for this, had not the government fallen shortly afterwards. (Apology 32c–d)

From these texts, it is clear that Leon of Salamis had an honorable reputation, he was put to death by the Thirty, and his execution was publicly recognized as unjust and unwarranted. But this leaves open the question of who Leon was.

== Identity of Leon ==
In his summer 1975 American Journal of Philology article "The Identity of Leon," University of North Carolina classicist W. James McCoy draws together several ancient authors' (including Xenophon) references to a pro-democracy Athenian general Leon who fought with great distinction in the Peloponnesian War. Provocatively, McCoy hypothesizes that Leon the general may also be Leon of Salamis.

McCoy cites ample textual evidence that Leon the general was one of the commanders of the Athenian fleet that was trapped in the harbor of Mytilene on the island of Lesbos by the Spartan blockade in the year 406 BC. The blockade was ultimately broken when the fleet's supreme commander, Conon, dispatched two blockade runners to get word of their situation to Athens. One of the ships, commanded by Erasinides, succeeded and Athens lifted the blockade a month later in the famed Battle of Arginusae.

McCoy hypothesizes that Leon, whose reputation was roughly equal to Erasinides and just below Conon's, may have commanded the second blockade runner, as Conon would have put the all-important mission in the hands of his top two subordinates. As Leon's name is not found among the list of either the survivors or casualties of the blockade or its subsequent lifting, this hypothesis makes sense—he was trapped by the blockade but he was neither killed nor freed by the blockade's lifting.

McCoy further hypothesizes that the second ship must have been captured by the Spartan fleet, explaining why it never reached Athens. The Spartan commander Callicratidas was noted for treating his captives humanely (a rare characteristic in the ancient world) and likely would not have killed or enslaved the Athenian sailors and their officers, but would have repatriated them after the war ended. Hence, McCoy reasons, it is quite possible that general Leon returned to Athens as a revered and respected veteran and hero.

It is thus possible that a publicly revered, pro-democrat, war-hero general Leon would be a threat to the Thirty Tyrants, and that they would have incentive both to kill Leon and to implicate as many people as possible in the death. McCoy, in his article, does not state this with any degree of certainty, but instead points out that it is an intriguing possibility.

== Sources ==
- Text of Plato's Apology
- Text of Xenophon's ''Hellenica''
- The Identity of Leon (W. James McCoy) JSTOR 294382
