= Oee =

Oee or OEE may refer to:

- Oee (Attica), a town of ancient Attica, Greece
- Overall equipment effectiveness
