= Dinarchus =

4th-century BC Greek speechwriter

Dinarchus or Dinarch (Greek: Δείναρχος; Corinth, c. 361 – c. 291 BC) was a logographer (speechwriter) in Ancient Greece. He was the last of the ten Attic orators included in the "Alexandrian Canon" compiled by Aristophanes of Byzantium and Aristarchus of Samothrace in the third century BC.

== Life ==
A son of Sostratus (or, according to the Suda, Socrates), Dinarchus settled at Athens early in life, and when not more than twenty-five was already active as a logographer—a writer of speeches for the law courts. As a metic, he was unable to take part in the debates. He had been the pupil both of Theophrastus and of Demetrius Phalereus, and had early acquired a certain fluency and versatility of style.

In 324 the Areopagus, after inquiry, reported that nine men had taken bribes from Harpalus, the fugitive treasurer of Alexander. Ten public prosecutors were appointed. Dinarchus wrote, for one or more of these prosecutors, the three speeches which are still extant: Against Demosthenes, Against Aristogeiton, and Against Philocles.

The sympathies of Dinarchus were in favor of an Athenian oligarchy under Macedonian control; but it should be remembered that he was not an Athenian citizen. Aeschines and Demades had no such excuse. In the Harpalus affair, Demosthenes as well as the others accused, were probably innocent. Yet Hypereides, the most fiery of the patriots, was on the same side as Dinarchus.

Under the regency of his old master, Demetrius Phalereus, Dinarchus exercised much political influence. The years 317–307 were the most prosperous of his life. On the fall of Demetrius Phalereus and the restoration of the democracy by Demetrius Poliorcetes, Dinarchus was condemned to death and withdrew into exile at Chalcis in Euboea.

About 292, thanks to his friend Theophrastus, he was able to return to Attica, and took up his abode in the country with a former associate, Proxenus. He afterwards brought an action against Proxenus on the ground that he had robbed him of some money and plate. Dinarchus died at Athens about 291.

== Surviving speeches ==
According to the Suda, Dinarchus wrote 160 speeches; and Dionysius held that, out of 85 extant speeches bearing his name, 58 were genuine: 28 relating to public, 30 to private causes. The surviving speeches mentioned above are:

- Against Demosthenes
- Against Aristogiton
- Against Philocles
