= Oikos =

Ancient Greek word for the family unit

In Ancient Greece, oikos (Ancient Greek: οἶκος [ôi̯.kos]; pl. οἶκοι [oikoi]) comprised two related but distinct concepts: the family and the family's house. (Note: The term itself has since been applied to social units of other cultures and times; it continues in contemporary use.) Its meaning shifted even within texts.

The oikos was the basic unit of society in most Greek city-states. For regular Attic usage within the context of families, the oikos referred to a line of descent from father to son from generation to generation. Alternatively, as Aristotle used it in his Politics, the term was sometimes used to refer to everybody living in a given house. Thus, the head of the oikos, along with his immediate family and his slaves, would all be encompassed. Large oikoi also had farms that were usually tended by the slaves, which were also the basic agricultural unit of the ancient Greek economy.

== House ==
Traditional interpretations of the layout of the oikos in Classical Athens have divided into men's and women's spaces, with an area known as the gynaikon or gynaikonitis associated with women's activities such as cooking and textiles work, and an area restricted to men called the andron. In Lysias's speech On the Murder of Eratosthenes, the women's rooms were said to be situated above the men's quarters, while in Xenophon the women's and men's quarters are next to one another.

More recent scholarship from historians such as Lisa Nevett and Lin Foxhall has argued for a more flexible approach to household space, with rooms not simply having a single fixed function, and gendering of space not being as simple as some rooms being for men and others for women. It has been argued that instead of dividing the household space into "male" and "female" areas, it is more accurate to look at areas as being private or public. In this model, access to the private areas was restricted to the family, while public areas accommodated visitors.

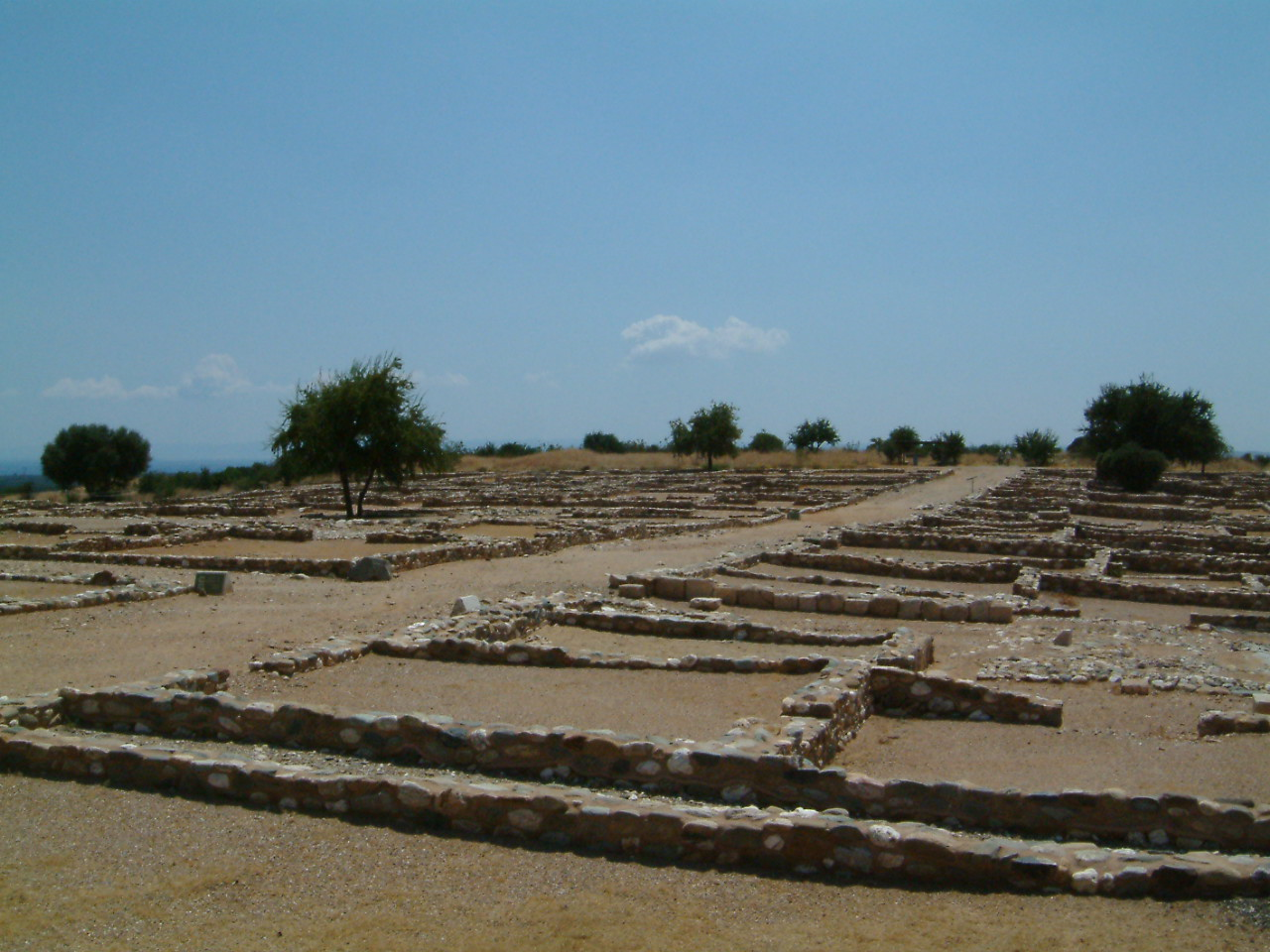
Part of the excavation at Olynthos. The grid layout, with regularly sized rectangular houses, can be seen.

In Olynthos and Halieis, street plans in the classical city were rectilinear, and thus houses were of regular shapes and sizes. By contrast, in Athens houses appear to have varied much more in size and shape. In the classical period, houses excavated from Olynthos were "invariably" organised around a colonnaded courtyard. Likewise, of the houses excavated at Halieis in the Argolid, most of the houses seem to have had a single entrance which gave access to a court, and Nevett also cites three buildings excavated on Thasos as being similarly arranged around a courtyard. Only a minority of the houses had surviving evidence of staircases, demonstrating that they definitely had upper storeys, while for the remainder of Olynthian houses the evidence is inconclusive. On the Murder of Eratosthenes demonstrates that at least some Athenian houses also had an upper storey. Entranceways at Olynthos were designed for privacy, preventing passers-by from seeing inside the house.

Historians have identified a "hearth-room" in ancient Greek houses as a centre of female activity; however, Foxhall has argued that Greek houses often had no permanent kitchens. For example, a house in Attica known as the Vari House had multiple possible places which may have been used for cooking, but no fixed fireplace, and no one place was used for the entire lifetime of the house. Nevett points out that houses frequently had a "complex pattern of spatial usage", with rooms being used for multiple purposes.

== Family ==
=== Men ===
A man was the head (kyrios, κύριος) of the household. The kyrios was responsible for representing the interests of his oikos to the wider polis and providing legal protection to the women and minors with whom he shared his household. Initially the kyrios of an oikos was the husband and father of offspring, but when any legitimate sons reached adulthood, the role of kyrios was transferred from the father to next male generation in many instances. When a son was given his portion of the inheritance, either before or after his father had died, he was said to have formed a new oikos. Therefore, new oikoi were formed every generation and would continue to be perpetuated through marriage and childbirth.

The relationship between father and son was bound intrinsically to the transfer of family property: a legitimate son could expect to inherit the property of his father and, in return, was legally obligated to provide for his father in his old age. If a son failed to care for his parents he could be prosecuted and a conviction would result in the loss of his citizen rights. However, sons were not compelled to maintain their fathers in their old age if they had not provided them with a skill. Furthermore, the heir to an inheritance would also be required to perform burial rites at the deceased's funeral and continue to provide annual commemorative rites. This would have been an extremely important consideration for the Athenians, who were notoriously pious.

=== Women ===
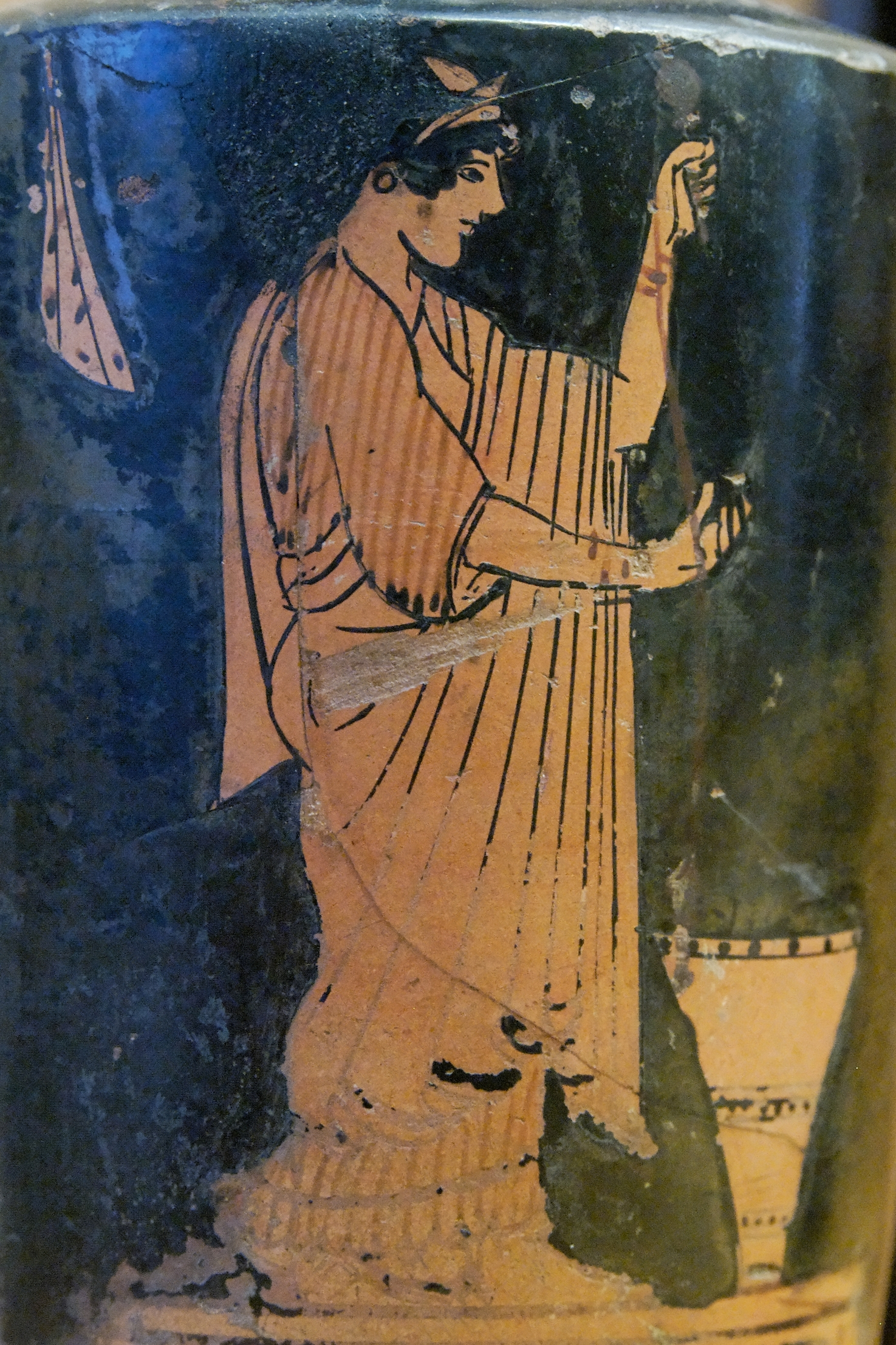
A woman spinning. Image on an Attic red-figure lekythos, c.480–470 BC. Now in the "Antonio Salinas" Regional Archaeological Museum of Palermo

Although men were part of both the polis and oikos, women had a role only in the oikos. In Athens, women of citizen status did not have many of the rights citizen men had. They had no political rights and could take no part in government. They could conduct only limited business and hold and inherit limited property. All business was conducted on a woman's behalf by her husband or father.

Athenian inheritance laws prioritised men over equally closely related women, and daughters in the absence of sons did not inherit at all, but came along with the estate as epikleroi.

Instead of automatic inheritance rights, daughters were given dowries to support. As late as the fourth century, Athenian inheritance law forbade the disposal of property by testament away from legitimate children.

At Sparta women were able to own and inherit property. Marriage was arranged for a woman by her father or male guardian. In the home women were kept segregated in their own quarters, called gynaikonitis, and were virtually unseen. They were responsible only for their oikos, which included providing for slaves and children, caring for the sick, and cooking, cleaning and making clothes. Much of this work, at least in wealthy families, would have been done by slaves, with the Athenian women largely taking a supervisory role.

Women rarely left the house, and even then would be accompanied by female slaves. Women did go shopping and to the wells to fetch water, but this was done mainly by slaves and by poorer women without slaves. Older women and widows had more freedom, as did Spartan wives. Wives in Sparta were permitted to drink alcohol, an act forbidden in most other city-states, and exercise more authority in the oikos; however, this standard was rarely observed as evidenced in the literature of the time. Poorer women undertook work, including selling goods in the market, spinning, making bread, agricultural laboring, acting as wet nurses or working alongside their husbands. It was not possible in such households to segregate men from women. Poorer widows often had to work, if they had no means of financial support.

Within religion women did play an important role, such as a dominant role at funerals, weddings, and a large number of public festivals. There were many priestesses, and women also had their own festivals. At some festivals, though, it is believed that women were not present; nor may they have attended associated performances at theaters.

=== Children ===
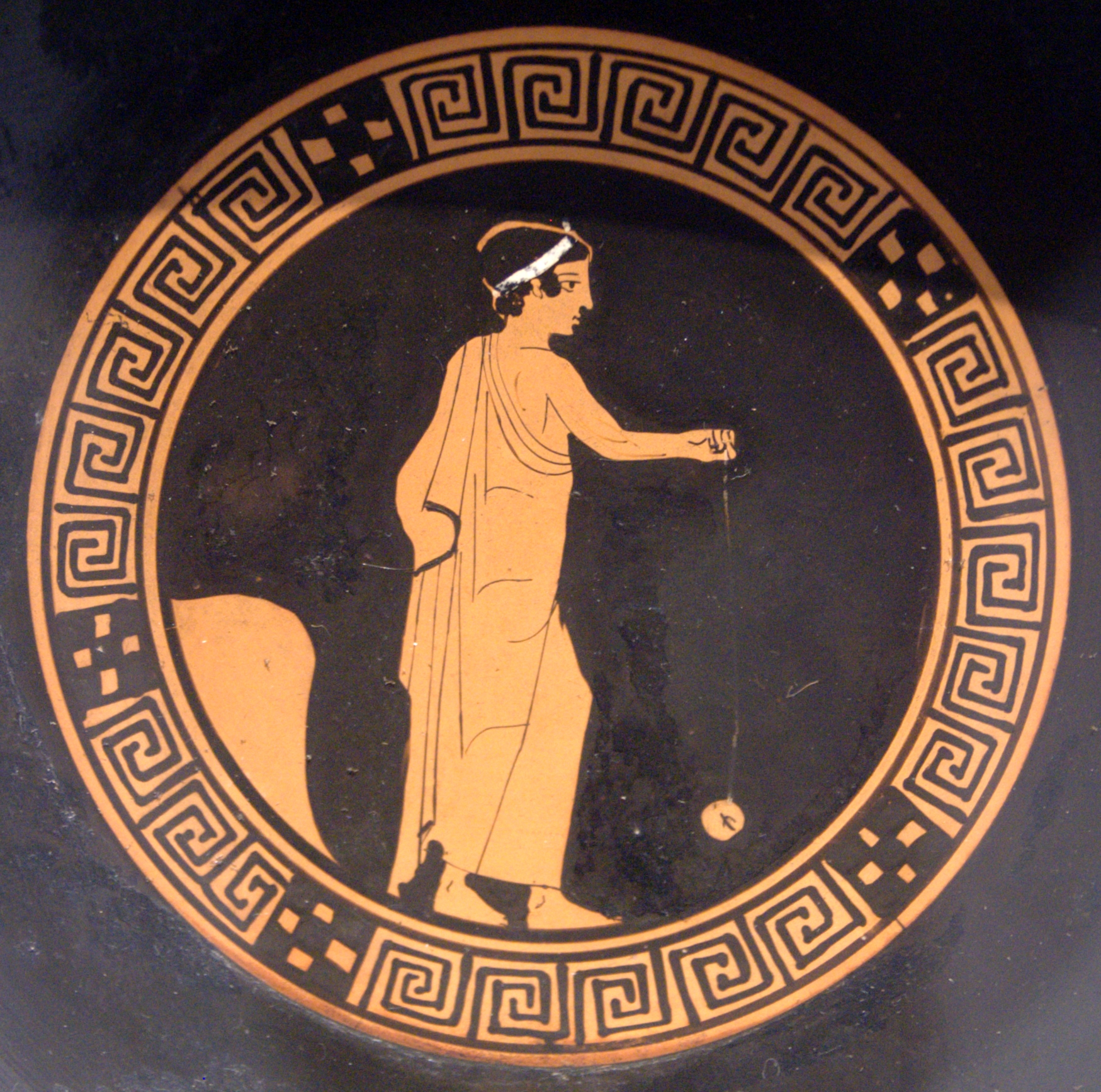
A boy plays with a yo-yo in this image from an Attic red-figure kylix

Childbirth took place at home, with all the women of the household in attendance. A female midwife (maia, μαῖα) may have been present, and a male doctor called in if complications arose, but virtually no information on midwifery exists. Childbirth was regarded as polluting so was not allowed to take place on sacred ground. At birth the guardian (usually the father) had to decide whether to keep the child or expose it. If it was kept a purification ceremony took place on the fifth or seventh day after birth.

It was the mother's duty to breast-feed her children, but wet nurses were employed, and pottery feeding bottles are also known. There is evidence from vase paintings for cradles of wickerwork or wood. From the 4th century BC children appear much more in artistic representations. Children played a number of games, and evidence of toys comes from literature, vase paintings and surviving examples of the actual toys. It was customary at various festivals to give children toys. When girls were about to marry and when boys reached adolescence, it was customary for them to dedicate their playthings to deities.

Male children were favored for many reasons. They perpetuated the family and family cult, cared for parents in old age and arranged a proper funeral for deceased parents. In addition, sons could inherit their mothers' dowry. Boys were raised in the female quarters until about the age of six, when they were educated in schools, but girls remained under the close supervision of their mothers until they married. They rarely went out of the women's section of the house and were taught domestic skills at home, though they did attend some religious festivals. In Sparta boys were removed from their families at the age of seven to be reared by the state.

=== Adoption ===
It was permissible for a man to adopt a son in order to continue his family line. The earliest references to Greek adoption are in the Gortyn Code, where an adopted son had fewer inheritance rights than a son by birth. By the 4th century BC in Athens, there were three forms of adoption: firstly, while a man was still alive; secondly, in his will; and thirdly, if a man died without a male heir and without providing for the adoption of a son in his will, he could have a son assigned to carry on his family.

An adopted son was no longer a member of his original oikos, but was transferred to the oikos of his adopter. If he wished to return to his original oikos, he had to leave a son of his own in his adoptive oikos in order that it might continue.

=== Pets ===
Animals were sometimes kept, indoors or out, not only for practical or economic purposes but as hobbies, for show or affectionately as pets. Homer mentions dogs (such as Argos); the most popular pet was a small dog, often represented on Attic gravestones and vases from the 5th century BC. Tame birds were also popular; but not cats. (Their sacred status in Egypt probably raised barriers.)

== Adultery ==
If a married woman was caught committing adultery, her husband was required to divorce her. Additionally, any woman found with a moichos (adulterer (Note: Though the Greek word moichos is usually translated in English as "adulterer", its definition is broader than the English term, encompassing someone who had illegitimate consensual sex with any Athenian woman, regardless of her marital status. The infraction committed by the moichos was called moicheia.)) was barred from public religious practices, as well as from wearing any ornament. Lysias's speech On the Murder of Eratosthenes offers two possible reasons for the concern of Athenian men with moicheia: firstly, that the seducer not only damages a woman's chastity, but also corrupts her mind, and secondly that a clandestine relationship brings into question the paternity of the woman's children. Christopher Carey considers that the second reason given, the bringing into doubt of the paternity of children, was the more important consideration, as not only was the paternity of children important for inheritance, in ancient Athens this inheritance involved the cult of the family's ancestors, making the purity of the blood even more important than it might otherwise be. Finally, adultery was feared because through seduction, unlike through rape, an adulterer might gain access to the household and its possessions.

== Modern sociology ==
The term oikos is also in recent and contemporary use. Weber used it to characterise social groups where members contribute fixed quantities of goods and services, in kind, for use within the group rather than for the market (or which depend completely on such contributions made externally): one of five types of rational association for satisfying wants (He attributes the term in this sense to Karl Rodbertus).

Several dozen to several hundred people may be known, but the quality time spent with others is extremely limited: only those to whom quality (face-to-face) time is devoted can be said to be a part of an oikos. Each individual has a primary group that includes relatives and friends who relate to the individual through work, recreation, hobbies, or by being neighbors. The modern oikos, however, includes people who share some sort of social interaction, be it through conversation or simple relation, for at least a total of one hour per week.

The term oikophobia is used by the philosopher Roger Scruton to mean rejection of one's home culture. This is also the sense in which conservative philosopher and classicist Benedict Beckeld has been using the term.

== See also ==
- Aristotle's views on women
- Agora
