= Logographer =

Logographer may refer to:

- Logographer (history), an early Greek prose writer of genealogies, local chronicles, and accounts of peoples and places
- Logographer (legal), a professional author in Classical Athens of forensic speeches for delivery by litigants in the popular courts
