= Andocides =

Greek logographer and orator (c.440–c.390 BC)

Andocides (/ˌænˈdɒsɪdiːz/; Ancient Greek: Ἀνδοκίδης, Andokides; c. 440 – c. 370 BC) was a logographer (speech writer) in Ancient Greece. He was one of the ten Attic orators included in the "Alexandrian Canon" compiled by Aristophanes of Byzantium and Aristarchus of Samothrace in the third century BC.

== Life ==
Andocides was the son of Leogoras, and was born in Athens around 440 BC. He belonged to the ancient Eupatrid family of the Kerykes, who traced their lineage up to Odysseus and the god Hermes.

During his youth, Andocides seems to have been employed on various occasions as ambassador to Thessaly, Macedonia, Molossia, Thesprotia, Italy, and Sicily. Although he was frequently attacked for his political opinions, he maintained his ground until, in 415 BC, he became involved in the charge brought against Alcibiades for having profaned the mysteries and mutilated the Herms on the eve of the departure of the Athenian expedition against Sicily. It appeared particularly likely that Andocides was an accomplice in the latter of these crimes, which was believed to be a preliminary step towards overthrowing the democratic constitution, since the Herm standing close to his house in the phyle Aegeis was among the very few which had not been injured.

Andocides was accordingly seized and thrown into prison, but after some time recovered his freedom by a promise that he would become an informer and reveal the names of the real perpetrators of the crime; and on the suggestion of one Charmides or Timaeus, he mentioned four, all of whom were put to death. He is also said to have denounced his own father on the charge of profaning the mysteries, but to have rescued him again in the hour of danger - a charge he strenuously denied. But as Andocides was unable to clear himself from the charge, he was deprived of his rights as a citizen, and left Athens.

Andocides traveled about in various parts of Greece, and was chiefly engaged in commercial enterprise and in forming connections with powerful people. The means he employed to gain the friendship of powerful men were sometimes of the most disreputable kind; among which a service he rendered to a prince in Cyprus is mentioned in particular.

In 411 BC, Andocides returned to Athens on the establishment of the oligarchic government of the Four Hundred, hoping that a certain service he had rendered the Athenian ships at Samos would secure him a welcome reception. But no sooner were the oligarchs informed of the return of Andocides, than their leader Peisander had him seized, and accused him of having supported the party opposed to them at Samos. During his trial, Andocides, who perceived the exasperation prevailing against him, leaped to the altar which stood in the court, and there assumed the attitude of a supplicant. This saved his life, but he was imprisoned. Soon afterwards, however, he was set free, or escaped from prison.

Andocides then went to Cyprus, where for a time he enjoyed the friendship of Evagoras; but, by some circumstance or other, he exasperated his friend, and was consigned to prison. Here again he escaped, and after the restoration of democracy in Athens and the abolition of the Four Hundred, he ventured once more to return to Athens; but as he was still suffering under a sentence of civil disenfranchisement, he endeavored by means of bribes to persuade the prytaneis to allow him to attend the assembly of the people. The latter, however, expelled him from the city. It was on this occasion, in 411 BC, that Andocides delivered the speech still extant "On his return", on which he petitioned for permission to reside at Athens, but in vain. In his third exile, Andocides went to reside in Elis, and during the time of his absence from his native city, his house there was occupied by Cleophon, the leading demagogue.

Andocides remained in exile until after the overthrow of the tyranny of the Thirty by Thrasybulus, when the general amnesty then proclaimed made him hope that its benefit would be extended to him also. He himself says that he returned to Athens from Cyprus, where he claimed to have great influence and considerable property. Because of the general amnesty, he was allowed to remain at Athens, enjoyed peace for the next three years, and soon recovered an influential position. According to Lysias, it was scarcely ten days after his return that he brought an accusation against Archippus or Aristippus, which, however, he dropped on receiving a sum of money. During this period Andocides became a member of the boule, in which he appears to have possessed a great influence, as well as in the popular assembly. He was gymnasiarch at the Hephaestaea, was sent as architheorus to the Isthmian Games and Olympic Games, and was even entrusted with the office of keeper of the sacred treasury.

But in 400 BC, Callias, supported by Cephisius, Agyrrhius, Meletus, and Epichares, urged the necessity of preventing Andocides from attending the assembly, as he had never been formally freed from the civil disenfranchisement. Callias II also charged him with violating the laws respecting the temple at Eleusis. The orator pleaded his case in the oration still extant "on the Mysteries" (περὶ τῶν μυστηρίων), in which he argued that he had not been involved in the profanation of the mysteries or the mutilation of the herms, that he had not violated the laws of the temple at Eleusis, that anyway he had received his citizenship back as a result of the amnesty, and that Callias was really motivated by a private dispute with Andocides over inheritance. He was acquitted. After this, he again enjoyed peace until 394 BC, when he was sent as ambassador to Sparta regarding the peace to be concluded in consequence of Conon's victory off Cnidus. On his return, he was accused of illegal conduct during his embassy. The speech "On the peace with the Lacedaemonians" (περὶ τῆς πρὸς Λακεδαιμονίους εἰρήνης), which is still extant, refers to this affair. It was delivered in 393 BC (though some scholars place it in 391 BC). Andocides was found guilty, and sent into exile for the fourth time. He never returned afterwards, and seems to have died soon after this blow.

Andocides appears to have fathered no children, since he is described at the age of 70 as being childless, although the scholiast on Aristophanes mentions Antiphon as a son of Andocides. The large fortune which he had inherited from his father, or acquired in his commercial undertakings, was greatly diminished in the latter years of his life.

== Oratory ==
As an orator, Andocides does not appear to have been held in very high esteem by the ancients, as he is seldom mentioned, though Valerius Theon is said to have written a commentary on his orations. We do not hear of his having been trained in any of the sophistical schools of the time, and he had probably developed his talents in the practical school of the popular assembly. Hence his orations have no mannerism in them, and are really, as Plutarch says, simple and free from all rhetorical pomp and ornament.

Sometimes, however, his style is diffuse, and becomes tedious and obscure. The best among his orations is that "on the Mysteries"; but, for the history of the time, all are of the highest importance.

Besides the three orations already mentioned, which are undoubtedly genuine, there is a fourth against Alcibiades (κατὰ Ἀλκιβιάδου), said to have been delivered by Andocides during the ostracism of 415 BC; but it is probably spurious, though it appears to contain genuine historical matter. Some scholars ascribed it to Phaeax, who took part in the ostracism, according to Plutarch. But it is more likely that it is a rhetorical exercise from the early fourth century BC, since formal speeches were not delivered during ostracisms and the accusation or defence of Alcibiades was a standing rhetorical theme. Besides these four orations we possess only a few fragments and some very vague allusions to other orations.

== List of extant speeches ==
=== On the Mysteries (Περὶ τῶν μυστηρίων "De Mysteriis"). ===
Andocides made the speech "On the Mysteries" as a defense against the accusations made against him by Athens for attending the Eleusinian Mysteries without permission, as he was prohibited under Isotimides' order. The case's prosecutors had insisted that Andocides be put to death. His attendance at the Eleusinian Mysteries in Eleusis around 400 BCE was the main accusation made against him. Additionally, he was charged with unlawfully placing an olive branch on the altar of the Eleusinium at Athens during the Mysteries.

The speech can be split into two parts. In the first, Andocides asserted that the decree of Isotimides had no power to prevent him from attending the Eleusinian Mysteries because he was innocent of impiety and had not confessed to it. He would go on to declare that because of alterations made to the law in 403 BCE, the decree altogether was no longer legitimate.

In the second part of the speech, he would move on to claim that his prosecutors, namely Cephisius, Meletus, Epichares and Agyrrhius, were not legitimate by making allegations against them. Andocides asserted that Cephisius, Meletus, and Epichares had also committed crimes prior to the legal revisions, exposing their hypocrisy in bringing charges against him since they would also be at risk of being prosecuted. Andocides asserts that Agyrrhius is ineligible to prosecute them for their private conflicts.

This speech was successful in persuading the jury, as Andocides was sentenced to be innocent. Gagarin and MacDowell commented on the oration, saying that while the speech itself is rather rough on its wording, it is a genuine speech of Andocides fighting for his life and was “sufficiently clear and logical”.

=== On His Return (Περὶ τῆς ἑαυτοῦ καθόδου "De Reditu"). ===
“On His Return” was a speech made by Andocides in an attempt to be brought back to Athen after being exiled from the city-state in 415 BCE for impious acts. Despite commonly being considered as the second work in Andocides’ orations, “On His Return” precedes "On the Mysteries” in date. Andocides tries to return to the city-state in 411 BCE. To ensure his return would be welcomed, he had obtained some Macedonian timber and sold them to the Athenian fleet stationed at Samos. However, in an interesting turn of events, Andocides’ goodwill would turn against him. The Four Hundred, an oligarchy, had just come into reign from a coup in 411 BCE, they were faced with objections from the sailors at Samos, who were mostly democratic. As a result, Andocides was imprisoned by Perisander, the leader of the Four Hundred.

“On His Return” was made after the downfall of the Four Hundred, with Andocides appealing to seek forgiveness and be reaccepted into Athenian society. Experts have distinctively noted that this oration has a tone different from “On The Mysteries”, in which Andocides was more prone to admit his faults and put himself at a lower light. Saying that “I stood disgraced in the eyes of the gods” and addressing his crime as “such a piece of madness”. However, his efforts were to no avail, as he only was readmitted into the Athenian society upon “On The Mysteries”.

=== On the Peace with Sparta (Περὶ τῆς πρὸς Λακεδαιμονίους εἰρήνης "De Pace"). ===
“On the Peace with Sparta” was given for advocating the acceptance of the terms of peace offered by Sparta during the Corinthian War between Sparta and a coalition consisting of the city-states Athens, Boeotia, Corinth and Argos. Andocides was selected as one of the four delegates that represented Athens in the negotiation of peace between them and Sparta. The delegation were given the authority to conclude the treaty in Sparta, Considering that Andocides was just reaccepted into Athens by “On The Mysteries” in 403 BCE. The delegation shows that Andocides had gained considerable popularity among the Athenians within eight years upon his return. Still, with the authority given, the team of delegates decided to bring the terms back to Athens for approval. The speech gives the historical context behind the offer of truce, and gives a list of arguments for the acceptance of Sparta's terms for peace. The terms that were given were closely related to the Spartan victory in the Peloponnesian War, after which rather unfair terms had been imposed on the Athenians by Sparta for peace. They include:

1. Athens would destroy Athenian town walls
2. Athens would give up the Delian League
3. Athens would shrink the Athenian navy except a mere twelve ships
4. Athens would Install the Thirty, an oppressive oligarchic regime

The peace terms offered by Sparta were mostly responses to the terms listed above, they include:

1. Athens would be allowed to rebuild their town walls
2. Athens would be able to expand their navy and control three islands at the north of the Aegean sea
3. Greeks cities would be independent, except those in Asia, which would be under Persian control.

In “On the Peace with Sparta”, Andocides argues that such terms were satisfactory for the Athenian side, claiming that “it is better to make peace on fair terms than to continue fighting”. However, the speech would fail to convince the Athenians, partly because of Andocides’ aristocratic origins and oligarchic political stance. Andocides would flee from Athens and be exiled again for allegedly accepting bribes and making false reports. There is no information on his life after the exile.

Still, Gagarin and MacDowell commented that Andocides speaks like a professional orator in this speech, this seems to imply that he has received extensive training and gained considerable experience on public speaking.

=== Against Alcibiades (Κατὰ Ἀλκιβιάδου "Contra Alcibiadem"). ===
This oration criticises Alcibiades for an ostracism which he and the speaker were in danger of falling victim to. An ostracism was a method of banishing a citizen for a decade. The oration claims that Alcibiades bought a female slave from one of the captives after the fall of Melos.

The speaker bashes Alcibiades for his questionable morals and acts, as shown in he recounting Alcibiades’ actions during the Olympic games in 416 BCE, “ Alcibiades will not endure it (defeat in Olympia) even at the hands of his fellow-citizens” and that “he does not treat his own fellow Athenians as his equals, but robs them, strikes them, throws them into prison, and extorts money from them”.

However, this speech fails to meet its goal of ostracizing Alcibiades, as followers of him and Nicas rallied support for the two and instead urged people to vote against Hyperbolus, a less politically significant figure. This strategy is successful as Hyperbolus was banished instead of the two. This would mark the fall of the ostracism system, as it was controversial among the public that it could be manipulated in such a way, the system would be abandoned soon after this case.

Although attributed to Andocides, it has been widely agreed upon that Andocides was not the one who made this speech. For the reason that the author of the speech lacks the correct understanding of the procedures of an ostracism and Athenian politics in general, the style of the speech was also significantly different than that of Andocides. One popular theory of the authorship of the speech was that it was written by Phaeax, another orator in Athens at the time.

== Notes ==
Attribution
