= Oea (Attica) =

Ancient Athenian deme

Coordinates: 38°05′00″N 23°38′27″E

Oea or Oia (Ancient Greek: Ὀία) or Oee or Oie (Οἴη) or Oe (Ὄη or Ὀή) was a deme of ancient Athens.

The location of Oea has been a matter of debate, with some situating it above the Pythium, to the west of Mount Aegaleos, to the north of the pass of Poecilum, and recent work putting the site northeast of Aspropyrgos.

In the Boule of 500, Oea held six seats, and the deme seems to have maintained this rough scale into the Roman period.

== Notable citizens ==
- Damonides, Athenian musicologist and advisor to Pericles
- Eratosthenes, famous adulterer in Lysias' first speech
- Lamachus, Athenian general, son of Xenophanes
- Tydeus, Athenian general, son of Lamachus
