= Eratosthenes (disambiguation) =

Eratosthenes was a Greek scholar of the third century BC.

It may also refer to:

- Eratosthenes (crater), a lunar impact crater named after him
- Eratosthenes (statesman), an ancient Athenian statesman of the fifth century BC
- Eratosthenes Seamount
- Eratosthenes of Croton, winner of the Stadion race at the 51st Olympiad in 576 BC
