= Epicrates =

Epicrates may refer to:

- Epicrates of Ambracia, an ancient Greek and Middle Comedy playwright
- Epicrates of Athens, an ancient Athenian involved in political affairs
- Epicrates, a genus of boas (snakes)
