= Against Simon =

Speech by Lysias

"Against Simon" (also known as "Reply to Simon") is a speech by Lysias, one of the "Canon of Ten" Attic orators. The speech, the third in the modern Lysianic corpus, concerns a case of "wounding with premeditation" or with the intention to commit murder. This offense was heard not in front of an ordinary court but instead by the council of the Areopagus where not only the litigants of the case but the witnesses as well had to swear to a special oath called the diomosia. In these proceedings, there was also an emphasis on citing only material that was specifically related to the case. Although it is not entirely clear how the Athenians differentiated between premeditated wounding and simple assault, scholars have suggested that the possession of a weapon could be a determining factor.

== People involved ==
=== Theodotos ===
The conflict in this case stems from a shared love interest between an unnamed defendant and the prosecutor, Simon. The love interest is a young Plataean man named Theodotos (pederastic relationships were not uncommon at the time, nor socially unacceptable: see Pederasty in ancient Greece), whose citizenship status is unclear. It is possible that he was a part of an underclass of free men, but it is also possible that he was a slave. This issue is important as regards a claim made by Simon who says that he has entered into a contract with the boy. As a slave, Theodotos would not have been able to enter into an agreement independently. It cannot be substantiated however that Simon's claim is true.

=== The unnamed speaker ===
The speaker of the case, a middle aged man who has retained Lysias as his speechwriter, goes unnamed and nothing is known about him apart from what information he gives about himself during the case. He claims that he, as well as his ancestors, have diligently served Athens and have provided great benefits and many public services, suggesting that they are wealthy members of the political elite of society. This, however, is a commonplace and may be an exaggeration because the defendant portrays himself throughout the speech as being too respectable and too old to suffer the embarrassment of making these incidents a public matter, despite saying that wrongs have been committed by both parties and were ultimately more the fault of Simon. It can be argued that if the defendant felt that he was totally innocent, then he himself would have brought charges against Simon, especially if he was a powerful figure in Athens.

=== Simon, the prosecutor ===
The prosecutor Simon, although his version of the story is not heard in the speech, seems to be a man of much lower standing in society. The defendant characterizes Simon as a man with a notorious reputation for violence and lawless behavior. The defendant answers to a previous claim made by Simon that he and Theodotos had an agreement between them. It was claimed by Simon that he retained the Plataean youth's sexual services for three hundred drachmas which the defendant outrageously ignored and proceeded to unlawfully remove the boy from him. This statement is disputed however because Simon's estate is revealed to be worth only two hundred and fifty drachmas, a value which is less than the worth of his contract with Theodotos. It would therefore have been impossible for Simon to have hired Theodotos as his lover for more money than he actually possessed.

== Notes on the case ==
Another notable factor in this case is the fact that four years have elapsed between the time of the incidents and the present. Although we cannot be certain, it seems that more has happened between these two men in that time and Simon is merely attempting to hurt the defendant for reasons other than what has been presented in the case. Using Lysias's speech, the defendant attempts to make it clear that Simon has overstated the seriousness of the injuries that he sustained from their previous quarrel and that he himself also suffered from numerous injuries. He also makes a brief attack on Simon's character by noting his disreputable experience in a military expedition to Coronea (which would place the case around 394 BC). The defendant states that Simon's conduct was so terrible that of all the Athenians, he alone was formally dismissed by the generals for misconduct. The speech ends by claiming once again that Simon was the instigator in all the encounters.

== Sources ==
1. Carey, Christopher. Trials from Classical Athens. New York: Routledge, 1997. (ISBN 978-0-415-10761-7)
2. Todd, S.C. Lysias (The Oratory of Classical Greece). Austin: University of Texas Press, 2000. (ISBN 978-0-292-78166-5)
3. Lamb, W.R.M. Lysias (Loeb Classical Library No. 244). Cambridge: Harvard University Press, 1930. (ISBN 978-0-674-99269-6)
