= Eratosthenes (Thirty Tyrants) =

Athenian oligarch, member of the Thirty Tyrants

Eratosthenes of Athens (Ancient Greek: Ἐρατοσθένης) was one of the Thirty Tyrants elected to rule the city of Athens after the Peloponnesian War (431–404 BC).

Having lost the war to the Spartans, the citizens of Athens elected thirty men as oligarchs. The Thirty introduced oppressive and highly exclusionary laws and began a political purge against Athenians who had been Spartan informers and collaborators during the long war. Eventually open hostilities between the Thirty and disenfranchised or disaffected Athenian citizens led to a coup d'etat in 403 BC that deposed them.

He is the subject of a legal oration by the orator Lysias, entitled "Against Eratosthenes" (Speech 12). According to some critics he is also the subject of another of Lysias' speech, "On the Murder of Eratosthenes" (Speech 1). However, the age of the Tyrant does not fit with the context of the latter speech: he must have been aged at least 18 in 411 BC to have served as a trierarch, and at least 30 by the time of the Thirty Tyrants period in 403/2 BC. But "On the Murder of Eratosthenes" suggests that the Eratosthenes referred to in that speech was younger than 30 at the time of his death – he is described as neaniskos, a word which Lysias elsewhere uses to refer to younger men.
