= Lisa Nevett =

Classical archaeologist

- Citizenship: British
- Occupation: Professor of Classical Archaeology

Academic background
- Education: Cambridge University
- Thesis: Variation in the Form and Use of Domestic Space in the Greek World in the Classical and early Hellenistic Periods (1993)
- Doctoral advisor: Anthony Snodgrass

Academic work
- Discipline: Classics
- Sub-discipline: Archaeology
- Institutions: University of Michigan

Lisa C. Nevett is a Professor of Classical Archaeology in the Department of Classical Studies at the University of Michigan, and Director of the Interdepartmental Program in Classical Art and Archaeology. Prior to joining Michigan she was a Lecturer in Classical Studies at The Open University, 1996–2003 and British Academy Postdoctoral Fellow in the Archaeology Department at Durham University, 1993–1996.

== Education ==
Nevett grew up in London, and first became interested in archaeology at the age of six, when her mother took her to visit the Treasures of Tutankhamun Exhibition at the British Museum in 1972. She graduated with her BA Honours in Classics at Clare College, Cambridge in 1987, followed by her MPhil in Archaeology (Archaeological Method and Theory, Later European Prehistory) in 1988. She obtained her PhD in 1993 from the Faculty of Classics at the University of Cambridge, under the supervision of Professor Anthony Snodgrass. Her dissertation was titled "Variation in the Form and Use of Domestic Space in the Greek World in the Classical and early Hellenistic Periods". She was awarded a State Studentship for Postgraduate Study, 1987–1988 for her MPhil and Major State Studentship for Doctoral Research, 1988–1990 from the British Academy. She was a recipient of a University of Cambridge Allen Scholarship during her PhD.

== Career and research ==
Nevett is a classical archaeologist who uses the material culture of the Greek and Roman worlds as a source for social history. Nevett has written extensively on households and the oikos in ancient Greece. Her research focuses largely on domestic architecture, and how the use of space within houses can reveal insights on broader social questions, and challenging traditional text-based ideas about household relationships. This includes the development of the Greek city, relationships between men and women within ancient Greek and Roman households, and interactions between indigenous and non-indigenous peoples at the frontiers of the Greek and Roman worlds. She has used the organisation of the house as a means of exploring wider problems such as the origins of the Greek drinking party (the symposium); the formation of the citizen state in Greece during the earlier first millennium, and the nature of the interactions between Greeks and Italians as the Roman world expanded eastwards towards the end of the first millennium BCE.

Currently she co-directs excavations at the city of Olynthos, with Bettina Tsigarida (Ephorate of Antiquities of Pella), Zosia Archibald (University of Liverpool/British School at Athens). A major goal of these excavations is to address the methodological problems involved in trying to obtain a detailed picture of domestic activities based on the archaeological record, and combines several field techniques, conceptual models and analytical strategies such as geoarchaeology, which are not often used in Classical Archaeology. She has previously been involved in other survey and excavation projects in Greece, Turkey, Libya and Britain.

Her first book, House and Society in the Ancient Greek World, was published by Cambridge University Press, New Studies in Archaeology Series, in 1999, reprinted and issued in paperback in 2001. Her second book, Domestic Space in Classical Antiquity was also published by CUP, in the Key Themes in Ancient History Series in 2010. She has also edited four volumes, the first, Ancient Greek Houses and Households: Chronological, Regional and Social Diversity, with Bradley A. Ault published with University of Pennsylvania Press, 2005, and the second, Greek Romans and Roman Greeks, Aarhus University Press, 2002. In 2017, she was the editor of Theoretical Approaches to the Archaeology of Ancient Greece, published by the University of Michigan Press. In 2018, she co-edited An Age of Experiment: Classical Archaeology Transformed (1976–2014) with James Whitley, published by the McDonald Institute for Archaeological Research in the McDonald Institute Monographs series. This volume features contributions from internationally recognised scholars who are former students of Professor Anthony Snodgrass, bringing unique perspectives on the current state of Classical archaeology and its place in global history, art history and archaeology. On September 15, 2017, Nevett discussed her research on RadioCIAMS, a podcast of the Cornell Institute of Archaeology and Material Studies

== Awards and honours ==
Nevett has been the recipient of several grants and awards for her research including the Society of Antiquaries of London, Lambarde Memorial Grant in 1992, a Visiting Fellowship at The Australian National University, Canberra (Australia) in 1994, British School at Rome Hugh Last Fellowship, 2001, AHRC(formerly Arts and Humanities Research Board of Great Britain) Research Leave Award, 2001 and University of Cincinnati Margo Tytus Visiting Fellowship in 2006.

From 2006 to 2008, she was the co-president of the Ann Arbour chapter of the Archaeological Institute of America, and president since 2012. She was a member of council of the Society for the Promotion of Hellenic Studies 1999–2002 and member of council for the Society for Libyan Studies 1997–2000.

She has been a Member of the Editorial Board for Hesperia, quarterly journal of the American School of Classical Studies at Athenssince 2009, and an editorial advisor for BBC History 2000–2004.
