= Polemarchus =

Philosopher in Athens during the 5th century BC

Polemarchus (/ˈpɒlɪˌmɑːrkəs/; Greek: Πολέμαρχος; 5th century – 404 BC) was an ancient Athenian philosopher from Piraeus.

== Life ==
The son of Cephalus of Syracuse, Polemarchus had two brothers, the famous orator Lysias and Euthydemus, and a sister who married Brachyllus. Polemarchus and Lysias traveled to Thurii when the latter was 15-years old.

During the Athenian political upheaval in the late 5th century, Polemarchus was singled out by the Thirty Tyrants for being a wealthy metic. Unlike his brother, he did not manage to escape and was executed by being forced to drink hemlock. Melobius, one of the Thirty, snatched golden earrings from Polemarchus' wife. After Polemarchus' death, the Thirty forbade his family from holding a funeral in any of their houses. Plato's Republic is set at Polemarchus' house in the Piraeus, which was located next to their shield manufacturing store that employed 120 skilled slaves. Polemarchus himself speaks briefly in Book 1 of the Republic.

== See also ==
- List of speakers in Plato's dialogues
