= On the Murder of Eratosthenes =

Speech by Ancient Greek writer Lysias

"On the Murder of Eratosthenes" is a speech by Lysias, one of the "Canon of Ten" Attic orators. The speech is the first in the transmitted Lysianic corpus and is therefore also known as Lysias 1. The speech was given by a certain Euphiletos (Εὐφίλητος), defending himself against the charge that he murdered Eratosthenes(Ἐρατοσθένης), after he supposedly caught Eratosthenes committing adultery with his wife. Euphiletos defends himself claiming that the killing of Eratosthenes was justifiable homicide, rather than murder. The case was heard before the Delphinion, the court which ruled on cases of justifiable homicide.

== Summary ==
Lysias was a professional Greek speech writer, whose unpretentious simplicity became the model for a plain style of Attic Greek. He was the son of Cephalus, a wealthy native of Syracuse who settled in Athens. Well over 200 passages were written by Lysias, but only 35 survived, and most have fragments missing.

The speech, which was to be delivered by Euphiletos, is divided into four sections. In the first section, the prooimion (introduction), Lysias has Euphiletos address the jury and introduce the case.

In the second section, the diegesis (account), Lysias has Euphiletos provide a narrative of the events leading to the murder. He describes how he married, and how his wife was seen by Eratosthenes at her mother-in-law's funeral. According to Euphiletos, Eratosthenes used Euphiletos' slave to persuade his wife to have an affair with him. In a scene which draws heavily on comic tropes, Euphiletos places himself in the role of the bumbling husband, describing how the pair carried out the affair under his nose. Euphiletos then recounts how an unnamed old woman revealed the affair and the existence of Eratosthenes to him and how he confirmed her story by interrogating the slave girl. He then waited until Eratosthenes returned, at which point he gathered his friends, stormed into his bedroom and killed Eratosthenes, declaring, “It is not I who am going to kill you, but our city's law, which you have transgressed and regarded as of less account than your pleasures, choosing rather to commit this foul offence against my wife and my children than to obey the laws like a decent person.”

In the third section, the pisteis (arguments), Lysias has Euphiletos justify his actions legally. Euphiletos argues that he was legally entitled to murder Eratosthenes for committing adultery with his wife, citing several laws whose text is no longer preserved, including one inscribed on a column on the Areopagus. He denies that Eratosthenes was dragged into the house or sought sanctuary at the household hearth – situations under which the murder would not have been legal. Witnesses are summoned to affirm that Eratosthenes confessed and offered monetary compensation, which Euphiletos argues he was under no obligation to accept, "as I held that our city's law should have higher authority." Lysias has Euphiletos defend the law on policy grounds: written law should be enforced so that people can trust it as a guide to how to behave appropriately and more specifically in order to discourage people from adultery. He devotes the remainder of his speech to establishing that the murder was not premeditated and that he had no pre-existing enmity with (or knowledge of) Eratosthenes.

Finally, in the epilogos (conclusion), Lysias has Euphiletos reiterate his claim that he has behaved according to the law and the interests of the city, saying that if Euphiletos is punished for the murder of Eratosthenes then the court is protecting seducers and corrupting society.

== Argument ==
Lysias’ main framework in this speech was to portray the case using common tropes of adultery from Greek comedy. In this standard narrative, an old, straightforward and naive Athenian everyman is cuckolded by his randy young wife and her conniving young lover. Porter cites Aristophanes' Thesmophoriazusae 476-89 and Menander's Samia 225–248 as well-known examples. Lysias presents Euphiletos in the role of the naive and trusting husband, a characterisation which supports Euphiletos' main arguments, that the murder was not premeditated and that the murder was justified in the interests of the whole community. It accomplishes the former by presenting him as too simple and straightforward to have engaged in the kind of deception and premeditation alleged by his accusers, and the latter by encouraging the audience of jurors to identify with him and his situation.

=== Premeditation ===
It was crucial that Lysias established that the murder of Eratosthenes was not premeditated. The prosecution case was that Euphiletos had entrapped Eratosthenes, and was therefore guilty of intentional homicide. Lysias has Euphiletos argue that the murder was not premeditated by stressing Euphiletos' lack of preparation: he had invited a friend around for dinner that night but had not kept him around to help, and he repeatedly stresses the difficulty Euphiletos had gathering witnesses after Eratosthenes entered his house because he had not organised them in advance. He does not call on witnesses to corroborate either of these points.

=== Authenticity ===
Porter has argued that the speech was never actually delivered in court but was "a particularly sophisticated form of practical rhetorical exercise— a fictional speech based upon a fictional case, designed not only to instruct and delight but, quite probably, to advertise the logographer’s skill." He bases this on five grounds. First, the speech is roughly half the length of comparable speeches concerning murder charges like Antiphon 5 and 6 and Lysias 12 and 13. Second, Euphiletos and Eratosthenes are "curiously generic" – the speech offers almost none of the details about Eratosthenes moral failings or Euphiletos' virtues that such speeches usually include. Third, Porter argues that the litigants' names match their roles in the drama and therefore suggest they are fictional: Euphiletos means "beloved," while Eratosthenes means "vigorous in love." The latter name is also exceptionally rare in Athens. Fourth, Porter argues that the dependence of the narrative on comic tropes suggests that it is fictional. Finally, Porter argues that the speech focuses excessively on the diegesis, giving little attention to matters that would be important if Euphiletos were a real defendant facing the death penalty. For instance, Euphiletos' arguments against premeditation are fairly weak and are not supported by calling on witnesses.

In his analysis, Cary says that the speech is unlike other known fictive speeches like the tetralogies of Antiphon. Additionally, the names Euphiletos and Eratosthenes and may have been invented for publication to maintain the true participant's anonymity.

== Bibliography ==
=== Translations & Commentaries ===
- Edwards, Michael & Stephen Usher. 1985. Antiphon & Lysias Warminster : Aris & Phillips.
- Todd, S.C. 2000. The Oratory of Classical Greece, Volume 2: Lysias. Austin : University of Texas Press. ISBN 0292781652
- Todd, S.C. 2007. A commentary on Lysias, speeches 1–11. Oxford : Oxford University Press. ISBN 9780198149095

=== Scholarship ===
- Carey, Christopher. 1997. Trials from Classical Athens. New York: Routledge.
- Porter. 2007. “Adultery by the Book: Lysias 1 (On the Murder of Eratosthenes) and Comic Diegesis” in Carawan, Attic Orators: 60 – 87.
