= Olympic Oration (Lysias) =

Speech delivered by the Athenian orator Lysias

The Olympic Oration (Ancient Greek: Ολυμπιακός, romanized: Olympiakos) was one of the epideictic speeches delivered by the Athenian orator Lysias (5th/4th century BC). According to the writings of Diodorus Siculus (1st century BC), it was recited by Lysias during the 98th Olympiad in 388 BC, one year before the Peace of Antalcidas, which marked the end of the Corinthian War.

In this speech, Lysias appealed for the unification and joint military action of all Greeks against Dionysius I, the tyrant of Syracuse in the West, and against Artaxerxes II of Persia in the East. He viewed both as the two greatest threats to Greek freedom during that period.

As a rhetorical work, Olympiakos stands as one of the key examples of political expression of the Panhellenic idea, alongside similar speeches by Gorgias, Isocrates, and Xenophon.

== Background ==
The cities of Athens, Thebes, Argos, and Corinth had been at war with Sparta for seven years. During this period, two new powers emerged, whose growing influence posed a threat to the freedom of the Greek city-states. In the East, the Persian naval force was becoming increasingly powerful—stronger than at any point since the Greco-Persian Wars. Meanwhile, in the West, Dionysius, the tyrant of Syracuse, had already conquered the colonies of Naxos, Catana, and Leontini. He had also succeeded in defeating the Carthaginians in western Sicily, and now, unchallenged, he posed a serious threat to the remaining Greek colonies of Magna Graecia.

== Speech ==
During the Olympic Games of 388 BC, Dionysius had sent an impressive delegation, led by his brother Thearides. The tents in which the members of the delegation stayed were adorned with richly embroidered, gold-patterned fabrics, while the chariots they brought to compete in the four-horse chariot race (tethrippon) were equally striking in appearance.

While the Syracusan envoys managed to impress the crowd, Lysias raised his voice and began delivering his speech. He began by praising Heracles as the founder of the Olympic Games, which were created to foster unity among the Greeks. Lysias declared that he would not engage in rhetorical tricks like a mere sophist, but instead offer counsel regarding the dangers facing the Greek world.

He urged the audience to recognize Dionysius as one of the two great enemies of the Greeks and to reject the unholy despot's presence at the sacred celebration of the Olympian Games. He reminded them of their duty to overthrow tyranny, liberate Sicily, and begin the war by striking those gathered in the luxurious tents.

Lysias went on to say that part of the Greek world was already under the control of barbarians, and another part under tyrants. On one side, Artaxerxes possessed great wealth and a powerful fleet; on the other, Dionysius was equally formidable. He called upon the Greeks to set aside their internal conflicts and unite, as their forefathers once did against their common enemies.

He urged the Spartans, as the acknowledged leading power in Greece, to take initiative, stressing the need for immediate action. Greece, he warned, could not afford to wait until the enemies from the East and West converged and came even closer to her borders.

The ending of the speech is lost, but judging by its content and structure, it is likely that only a small portion is missing.

== Bibliography ==
- Diodorus Siculus. Diodorus of Sicily in Twelve Volumes with an English Translation by C. H. Oldfather. Vols. 4–8. Cambridge, Mass.: Harvard University Press; London: William Heinemann, Ltd., 1989. Available online at the Perseus Digital Library.
- Lysias. Lysias with an English Translation by W. R. M. Lamb, M.A. Cambridge, Mass.: Harvard University Press; London: William Heinemann Ltd., 1930. Available online at the Perseus Digital Library.
- Evans, Richard. "Dionysius’ War on Rhegium and the ‘Lysias Olympic Oration’ (390–387 BC)." Available via Academia.edu.
- Jebb, Richard C. The Attic Orators from Antiphon to Isaeos. London: Macmillan, 1876. Available online at the Perseus Digital Library.
