= Lysias =

Athenian speechwriter (c. 445–c. 380 BC)

- Λυσίας
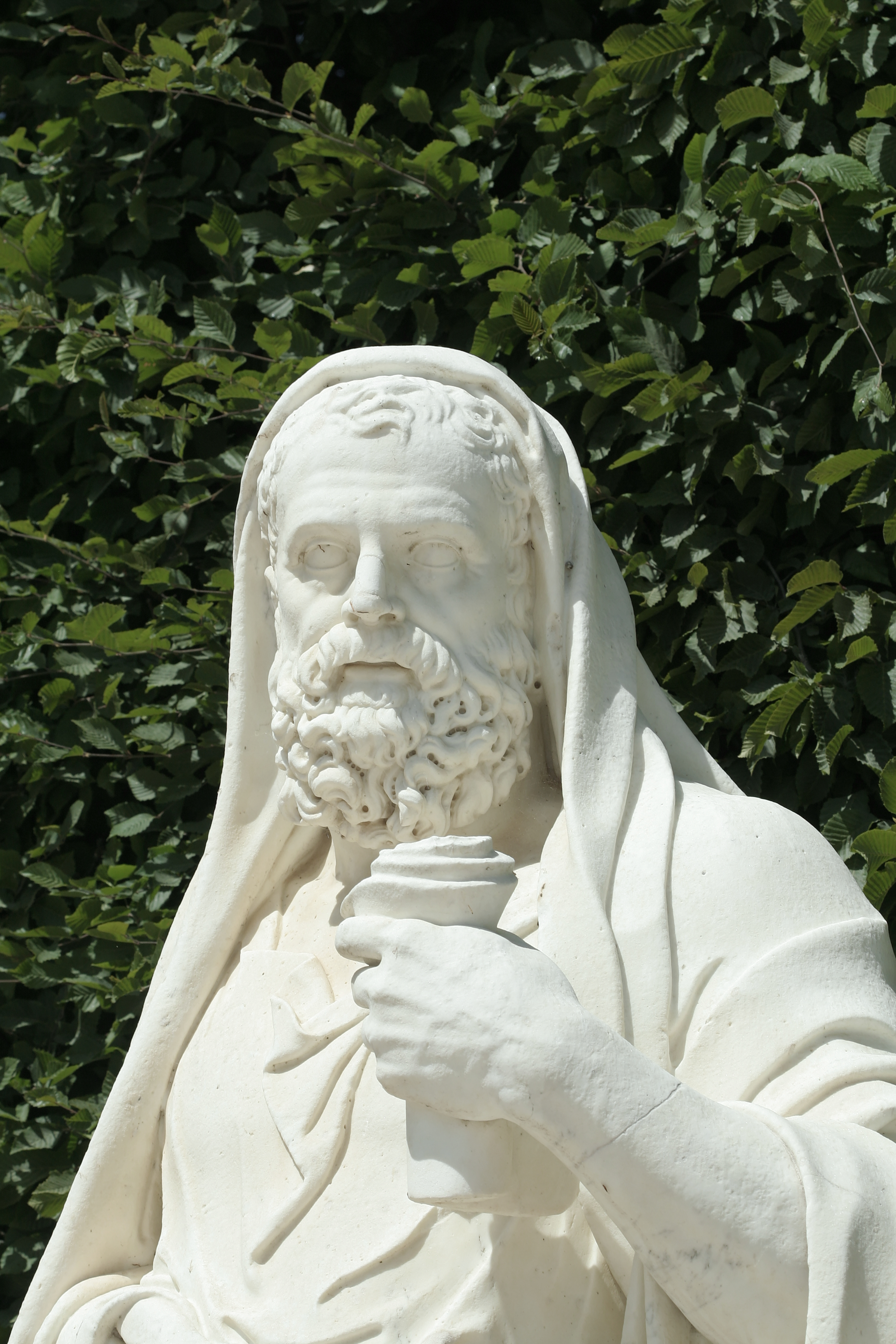
- Statue by Jean Dedieu (Gardens of Versailles)
- Born: c. 445 BC; Athens (traditional; sometimes given as Syracuse)
- Died: c. 380 BC
- Occupation: Logographer (speechwriter)
- Relatives: Cephalus (father); Polemarchus (brother)
- Writing career
- Notable works: Against Eratosthenes; Against Agoratus; Olympic Oration

Lysias (/ˈlɪsiəs/; Λυσίας; c. 445 – c. 380 BC) was an Athenian logographer and one of the ten Attic orators later canonized by Aristophanes of Byzantium and Aristarchus of Samothrace. He wrote speeches for litigants across a wide range of public and private actions during the late fifth and early fourth centuries BC, with thirty-four transmitted in the medieval corpus and many others known by title or fragment. Ancient critics, especially Dionysius of Halicarnassus, and modern scholarship identify Lysias as an exemplar of the plain style, emphasizing idiomatic diction, character-appropriate voice, and concise narrative framing. His speech Against Eratosthenes and the fragmentary Olympic Oration are commonly cited for historical evidence on postwar Athens and for programmatic statements on Greek politics.

== Life ==
According to Dionysius of Halicarnassus and the author of the life ascribed to Plutarch, Lysias was born in 459 BC, which would accord with a tradition that Lysias reached, or passed, the age of eighty. This date was evidently obtained by reckoning back from the foundation of Thurii (444 BC), since there was a tradition that Lysias had gone there at the age of fifteen. Modern critics, in general, place his birth later, c. 445 BC, and place the trip to Thurii around 430 BC.

Cephalus, his father, was a native of Syracuse, and on the invitation of Pericles had settled at Athens. The opening scene of Plato's Republic is set at the house of Cephalus's eldest son, Polemarchus, in Piraeus. The tone of the picture warrants the inference that the Sicilian family were well known to Plato, and that their houses must often have been hospitable to such gatherings. Further, Plato's Phaedrus opens with Phaedrus coming from conversation with Lysias at the house of Epicrates of Athens: he meets Socrates, with whom he will read and discuss the speech of Lysias he heard.

At Thurii, the colony newly planted on the Tarentine Gulf, the boy may have seen Herodotus, now a man in middle life, and a friendship may have grown up between them. There, too, Lysias is said to have commenced his studies in rhetoric—doubtless under a master of the Sicilian school possibly, as tradition said, under Tisias, the pupil of Corax, whose name is associated with the first attempt to formulate rhetoric as an art. The Athenian invasion of Sicily in 415–413 BC during the Peloponnesian War would ultimately create difficulties for Lysias's family, especially when the campaign ended in a devastating defeat for Athens. The continued attempt to link Lysias to the famous names of the era is illustrated by the ancient ascription to Lysias of a rhetorical exercise purporting to be a speech in which the captive Athenian general Nicias appealed for mercy to the Sicilians. The terrible blow to Athens quickened the energies of an anti-Athenian faction at Thurii. Lysias and his elder brother Polemarchus, with three hundred other persons, were accused of Atticizing. They were driven from Thurii and settled at Athens (412 BC).

Lysias and Polemarchus were rich men, having inherited property from their father, Cephalus; and Lysias claims that, though merely resident aliens, they discharged public services with a liberality which shamed many of those who enjoyed the franchise (Against Eratosthenes xii.20). The fact that they owned house property shows that they were classed as isoteleis (ἰσοτελεῖς), i.e. foreigners who paid only the same tax as citizens, being exempt from the special tax (μετοίκιον) on resident aliens. Polemarchus occupied a house in Athens itself, Lysias another in the Piraeus, near which was their shield factory, employing a hundred and twenty skilled slaves.

In 404 BC, the Thirty Tyrants were established at Athens under the protection of a Spartan garrison. One of their earliest measures was an attack upon the resident aliens, who were represented as disaffected to the new government. Lysias and Polemarchus were on a list of ten singled out to be the first victims. Polemarchus was arrested and compelled to drink hemlock. Lysias had a narrow escape, with the help of a large bribe. He slipped by a back-door out of the house in which he was a prisoner and took a boat to Megara. It appears that he rendered valuable services to the exiles during the reign of the tyrants, and in 403 Thrasybulus proposed that these services be recognised by the bestowal of the citizenship. The Boule, however, had not yet been reconstituted, and hence the measure could not be introduced to the ecclesia by the requisite preliminary resolution (προβούλευμα). On this ground, it was successfully opposed.

During his later years, Lysias—now probably a comparatively poor man owing to the rapacity of the tyrants and his own generosity to the Athenian exiles—appears as a hard-working member of a new profession—that of logographer, a writer of speeches to be delivered in the law courts. The thirty-four extant are but a small fraction. From 403 to about 380 BC, his industry must have been incessant. The notices of his personal life in these years are scanty. In 403 he came forward as the accuser of Eratosthenes, one of the Thirty Tyrants. This was his only direct contact with Athenian politics. The story that he wrote a defence for Socrates, which the latter declined to use, probably arose from a confusion. Several years after the death of Socrates, the sophist Polycrates composed a declamation against him, to which Lysias replied.

A more authentic tradition represents Lysias as having spoken his own Olympiacus at the Olympic festival of 388 BC, to which Dionysius I of Syracuse had sent a magnificent embassy. Tents embroidered with gold were pitched within the sacred enclosure, and the wealth of Dionysius was vividly shown by the number of chariots which he had entered. Lysias lifted up his voice to denounce Dionysius as, next to Artaxerxes, the worst enemy of Hellas, and to impress upon the assembled Greeks that one of their foremost duties was to deliver Sicily from a hateful oppression. The latest work of Lysias which can be dated (a fragment of a speech For Pherenicus) belongs to 381 or 380 BC. He probably died in or soon after 380 BC.

== Style ==
Lysias displays literary tact, humour, and attention to character in his extant speeches, and is famous for using his skill to conceal his art. It was obviously desirable that a speech written for delivery by a client should be suitable to his age, station and circumstances. Lysias was the first to make this adaptation truly artistic. His language is crafted to flow easily, in contrast to his predecessor Antiphon's pursuit of majestic emphasis, to his pupil (and close follower in many respects) Isaeus' more conspicuous display of artistry and more strictly logical manner of argumentation, and later to the forceful oratory of Demosthenes.

Translated into terms of ancient criticism, he became the model of the plain style (ἰσχνὸς χαρακτήρ, ἰσχνὴ/λιτὴ/ἀφελὴς λέξις: genus tenue or subtile). Greek and then Roman critics distinguished three styles of rhetorical composition—the grand (or elaborate), the plain and the middle, the plain being nearest to the language of daily life. Greek rhetoric began in the grand style; then Lysias set an exquisite pattern of the plain; and Demosthenes might be considered as having effected an almost ideal compromise.

The vocabulary of Lysias is relatively simple and would later be regarded as a model of pure diction for Atticists. Most of the rhetorical figures are sparingly used—except such as consist in the parallelism or opposition of clauses. The taste of the day not yet emancipated from the influence of the Sicilian rhetoric probably demanded a large use of antithesis. Lysias excels in vivid description; he has also the knack of marking the speaker's character by light touches. The structure of his sentences varies a good deal according to the dignity of the subject. He has equal command over the periodic style (κατεστραμμένη λέξις) and the non-periodic or continuous (εἰρομένη, διαλελυμένη). His disposition of his subject-matter is always simple. The speech has usually four parts: introduction (προοίμιον), narrative of facts (διήγησις), proofs (πίστεις), which may be either external, as from witnesses, or internal, derived from argument on the facts, and, lastly, conclusion (ἐπίλογος).

It is in the introduction and the narrative that Lysias is seen at his best. In his greatest extant speech—that Against Eratosthenes—and also in the fragmentary Olympiacus, he has pathos and fire; but these were not characteristic qualities of his work. In Cicero's judgment (De Orat. iii. 7, 28) Demosthenes was peculiarly distinguished by force (vis), Aeschines by resonance (sonitus); Hypereides by acuteness (acumen); Isocrates by sweetness (suavitas); the distinction which he assigns to Lysias is subtilitas, an Attic refinement—which, as he elsewhere says (Brutus, 16, 64) is often joined to an admirable vigour (lacerti). Nor was it oratory alone to which Lysias rendered service; his work had an important effect on all subsequent Greek prose, by showing how perfect elegance could be joined to plainness. Here, in his artistic use of familiar idiom, he might fairly be called the Euripides of Attic prose. His style has attracted interest from modern readers, because it is employed in describing scenes from the everyday life of Athens.

== Works ==
=== Extant speeches ===
Thirty-four Lysias speeches survive in their entirety. Three fragmentary ones have come down under the name of Lysias, while 127 more, now lost, are known from smaller fragments or from titles. In the Augustan age 425 works bore his name, of which more than 200 were allowed as genuine by the critics.

The numbering follows the Loeb edition (Lamb). "Jurisdiction" distinguishes public vs private actions where identifiable; "Forum" records Boulē, assembly, or law court when specified by the sources. Concise notes flag authorship or transmission issues.

No.	Speech	Date (approx.)	Genre	Jurisdiction	Forum	Core issue	Notes
1	On the Murder of Eratosthenes	Uncertain	Forensic	Public (homicide); Private (special plea)	Court	Euphiletos argues the killing was not premeditated	—
2	Funeral Oration	392 BC?	Epideictic	—	—	Praise of fallen soldiers during the Corinthian War	Authorship Uncertain
3	Against Simon	393 BC or later	Forensic	Public (wounding); Private (special plea)	Court	—	—
4	On a Wound by Premeditation	Uncertain	Forensic	Public (wounding with intent)	Court	Defense against charge of wounding with intent to kill	—
5	For Callias	Uncertain	Forensic	Public (impiety)	Court	Defense against impiety accusations	Fragmentary
6	Against Andocides	400/399 BC	Forensic	Public (impiety)	Court	—	Generally considered spurious; beginning lost
7	Defense in the Matter of the Olive Stump	396 BC or later	Forensic	Public (impiety)	Court	Defense concerning a sacred olive	—
8	Accusation of Calumny	Uncertain	Forensic	Private (property claim)	Court	—	Spurious
9	For the Soldier	395–387 BC	Forensic	Public (state claims)	Court	—	—
10	Against Theomnestus 1	384–383 BC	Forensic	Private (slander)	Court	—	—
11	Against Theomnestus 2	384–383 BC	Forensic	Private (slander)	Court	—	Epitome of Lysias 10
12	Against Eratosthenes	403 BC or soon after	Forensic	Public (homicide)	Court	Accusation of one of the Thirty for Polemarchus’ murder	Widely circulated as a reading text
13	Against Agoratus	399 BC	Forensic	Public (homicide)	Court	Prosecution arising from post-Aegospotami politics	—
14	Against Alcibiades 1	395 BC	Forensic	Public (military offences)	Court	Charges linked to Alcibiades’ conduct	—
15	Against Alcibiades 2	395 BC	Forensic	Public (military offences)	Court	Companion to 14	—
16	In Defense of Mantitheus	392–389 BC	Forensic	Public (dokimasia)	Boulē	Defense at scrutiny before the Council	—
17	On the Property of Eraton	397 BC	Forensic	Private (property claim)	Court	Recovery of property	—
18	On the Property of the Brother of Nicias: Peroration	396 BC	Forensic	Public (illegality)	Court	Peroration concerning property subject to public claim	—
19	On the Property of Aristophanes	388–387 BC	Forensic	Public (state claims)	Court	Proceedings about property and state claims	—
20	For Polystratus	410 BC	Forensic	Public (state offences)	Court	Defense against prosecution for anti-democratic acts	—
21	Defense Against a Charge of Taking Bribes	403/2 BC	Forensic	Public (state offences)	Court	Defense against bribery/corruption charge	—
22	Against the Corn-Dealers	386 BC	Forensic	Public (state offences)	Boulē	Prosecution of grain retailers for price-fixing	—
23	Against Pancleon	Uncertain (400/399?)	Forensic	Private (special plea)	Court	—	—
24	For the Disabled Man	Uncertain	Forensic	Public (dokimasia)	Boulē	Defense of eligibility for disability pension	—
25	Defense Against a Charge of Subverting the Democracy	401–399 BC	Forensic	Public (dokimasia)	Court	Defense against alleged support for the Thirty	—
26	On the Scrutiny of Evandros	382 BC	Forensic	Public (dokimasia)	Boulē	Scrutiny of an official designate	—
27	Against Epicrates and his Fellow-Envoys	390 BC	Forensic	Public (state offences)	Court	Charges against envoys for misconduct	—
28	Against Ergocles	388 BC	Forensic	Public (state offences)	Court	Prosecution for financial/military misconduct	—
29	Against Philocrates	388 BC	Forensic	Public (state claims)	Court	—	—
30	Against Nicomachus	399 BC	Forensic	Public (state offences)	Court	Charges tied to law-revision activities	—
31	Against Philon	403–398 BC	Forensic	Public (dokimasia)	Court	Objection to a councilor-elect’s fitness/loyalty	—
32	Against Diogeiton	400 BC	Forensic	Private (guardianship)	Court	Guardian accused of withholding wards’ property	—
33	Olympic Oration	388 or 384 BC	Epideictic	—	Olympia	Festival oration urging Panhellenic policy	—
34	Against the Subversion of the Ancestral Constitution	403 BC	Deliberative	—	Assembly	Against proposal to confine citizenship to landowners	—

=== Fragments ===
Hermann Sauppe collected 355 fragments under the name of Lysias, printed in Oratores Attici II, 170–216; 252 of these belong to 127 speeches known by title, and six are comparatively substantial. Among the larger items, the fragmentary For Pherenicus is datable to 381–380 BC and is frequently treated as the latest secure work in the corpus.

Modern editions incorporate the fragment dossier with updated testimonia and numbering, and discuss authenticity case-by-case in the apparatus and introductions.

=== Miscellaneous ===
A short piece titled To His Companions, a Complaint of Slanders is transmitted in later lists and is usually judged non-genuine, a school exercise attributed to Lysias at a much later date.

The speech reproduced and critiqued in Plato’s Phaedrus (230e–234) is commonly treated as Platonic composition rather than a verbatim text by Lysias. Ancient testimonia already frame it as a showpiece for analysis, and modern stylometric and philological studies support Platonic authorship, though discussion continues over the degree of fidelity to Lysianic style.

== Editions ==
Editions by

- Aldus (Editio princeps, Venice, 1513)
- with variorum notes, by J. J. Reiske (1772)
- Immanuel Bekker (1823)
- W. S. Dobson (1828) in Oratores Attici
- Johann Georg Baiter and Hermann Sauppe, Oratores Attici, vol. 1, Zurich, 1839, pp. 59 ff.
- C. Scheibe (1852)
- T. Thalheim (1901, Teubner series, with bibliography) – PDF
- C. G. Cobet (4th ed., by J. J. Hartman, 1905)
- Karl Hude, Oxford Classical Texts, 1912
- W. R. M. Lamb, Loeb Classical Library, 1930
- Umberto Albini, Greek text and Italian translation, Florence: Sansoni, 1955
- Louis Gernet and Marcel Bizos, Collection Budé, 2 vols., 1959–1962
- Enrico Medda, Greek text and Italian translation, 2 vols., Milan: BUR, 1992–1995
- Christopher Carey, Oxford Classical Texts, 2007

Editions of select speeches by

- J. H. Bremi (1845)
- R. Rauchenstein (1848, revised by C. Fuhr, 1880–1881)
- H. Frohberger (1866–1871)
- H. van Herwerden (1863)
- Andreas Weidner (1888)
- Evelyn Shirley Shuckburgh (1882) – PDF
- F. J. Snell, Epitaphios, Clarendon Press, (1887)
- A. Westermann and W. Binder (1887–1890)
- G. P. Bristol (1892)
- M. H. Morgan (1895) – PDF
- W. H. Wait (1898) – PDF
- C. D. Adams (1905) – PDF
- There is a special lexicon to Lysias by D. H. Holmes (Bonn, 1895, online). See also Jebb's Attic Orators (1893, vol. 1, vol. 2) and Selections from the Attic Orators (2nd ed.; 1st ed. online).
- The first volume of a full commentary on the speeches is S. C. Todd, A Commentary on Lysias, Speeches 1–11. Oxford: Oxford University Press, 2007. pp. ix, 783. ISBN 978-0-19-814909-5.
