= Jean Dedieu =

French sculptor (c.1645–1727)

Jean Dedieu (c.1645 – 31 May 1727) was a French sculptor. His brother Pons Dedieu (also a sculptor) was grandfather of Antoine Raspal and great-grandfather of Jacques Réattu, both painters.
