= Logographer (legal) =

Ancient speechwriter

The title of logographer (from the Ancient Greek λογογράφος, logographos, a compound of λόγος, logos, 'word', and γράφω, grapho, 'write') was applied to professional authors of judicial discourse in Ancient Greece. The modern term speechwriter is roughly equivalent.

In the Athens of antiquity, the law required a litigant to make his case in front of the court with two successive speeches. Lawyers were unknown, and the law permitted only one friend or relative to aid each party. If a litigant did not feel competent to make his own speech effectively, he would seek the service of a logographer (also called a λογοποιός, logopoios, from ποιέω, poieo, 'to make'), to whom he would describe his case. The logographer would then write a speech that the litigant would learn by heart and recite in front of the court. Antiphon (480–410 BC) was among the first to practice this profession; the orator Demosthenes (384–322) was also a logographer. Many logographers built a foundation for a later career in politics by defending people who were the targets of politicized prosecutions.

== Role of the logographer ==
Logographers played a pivotal role in the larger interactions of the Athenian court system. Athenian courts differ from modern examples of legal systems in several significant ways. In Classical Athens, no class of legal experts existed. The absence of prosecution and defense attorneys meant cases were decided mainly upon the basis of the speeches given by plaintiff and defendant. Litigants were expected to deliver their own speeches in court, but often relied on professional speech writers to craft their words. To support the arguments made in these speeches, the parties involved in litigation often produced several witnesses. In Classical Athens, the social status, wealth, and esteem of a witness determined the strength and potential impact of his (typically a male's) testimony and not necessarily the accuracy of his account. Unlike in modern legal systems, these "character witnesses" wielded considerable influence over juries. The Athenian court system was characterized by a lack of state intervention. Pursuing litigation, collecting evidence, and prosecuting were all functions of the legal process left to the responsibility of the litigant. The juries which decided the outcome of these cases were large assemblies of Athenian citizens, not state-appointed judges.

== List of well-known logographers ==
- Antiphon
- Demosthenes
- Dinarchus
- Hypereides
- Isaeus
- Isocrates
- Lysias

== See also ==
- Rhetoric
- Attic orators
