= Attic orators =

5th–4th century BC group of Greek speakers

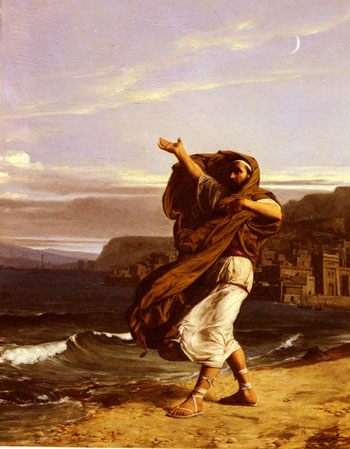
Lives of the Ten Orators, from an unknown writer whose allonym is Pseudo-Plutarch, delivers a pseudepigraphy for the ten Attic orators; here Demosthenes practises his craft.

The ten Attic orators were considered the greatest Greek orators and logographers of the classical era (5th–4th century BC). They are included in the "Canon of Ten", which probably originated in Alexandria. A.E. Douglas has argued, however, that it was not until the second century AD that the canon took on the form that is recognised today.

== Alexandrian "Canon of Ten" ==
- Aeschines
- Andocides
- Antiphon
- Demosthenes
- Dinarchus
- Hypereides
- Isaeus
- Isocrates
- Lycurgus
- Lysias

As far as Homer (8th or 9th century BC), the art of effective speaking was of considerable value in Greece. In Homer's epic, the Iliad, the warrior, Achilles, was described as "a speaker of words and a doer of deeds".

Until the 5th century BC, however, oratory was not formally taught. It was not until the middle of that century that the Sicilian orator, Corax, along with his pupil, Tisias, began a formal study of rhetoric. In 427 BC, another Sicilian named Gorgias of Leontini visited Athens and gave a speech which dazzled the citizens. Gorgias’s "intellectual" approach to oratory, which included new ideas, forms of expression, and methods of argument, was continued by Isocrates, a 4th-century BC educator and rhetorician. Oratory eventually became a central subject of study in the formalized Greek education system.

The work of the Attic orators inspired the later rhetorical movement of Atticism, an approach to speech composition in a simple rather than ornate style.
