= Thirty Tyrants =

404–403 BCE Athenian pro-Spartan ruling group

The Thirty Tyrants (Ancient Greek: οἱ τριάκοντα τύραννοι, hoi triákonta týrannoi) were an oligarchy that briefly ruled Athens from 404 BC to 403 BC. Installed into power by the Spartans after the Athenian surrender in the Peloponnesian War, the Thirty became known for their tyrannical rule, first being called "The Thirty Tyrants" by Polycrates. Although they maintained power for only eight months, their reign resulted in the killing of 5% of the Athenian population, the confiscation of citizens' property, and the exile of other democratic supporters.

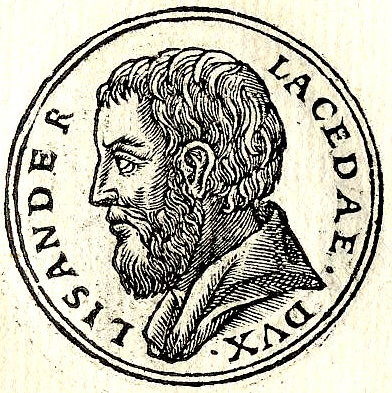
Portrait of Lysander the Spartan general from Guillaume Rouille's book, Promptuarii Iconum Insigniorum

== Historical background ==
After the Athenian navy was destroyed at the battle of Aegospotami in 405 BC, Lysander led the Spartan and Peloponnesian League naval force to Athens for the final destruction of the city. The Athenians prepared for a siege, but without a navy to defend them or import food, many Athenian citizens starved. After the Spartans began cutting them off by occupying Decelea, the Athenians decided to surrender in March 404 BC. After initial negotiations of surrender failed, Athenian general Theramenes asked the Ecclesia for permission to speak with Lysander, believing that he could get the best possible conditions from the Spartans. His request was granted, and he met with Lysander at Samos, who then sent him to Sparta. Before the Spartan assembly and representatives of the Peloponnesian League, Theramenes negotiated a final surrender of Athens, ending the Peloponnesian War.

While some members of the Peloponnesian League called for Athens to be completely destroyed, the Spartans refused to do so, arguing that Athens was one of the great cities of Greece. The terms agreed on called for Athens to destroy the long walls of Piraeus, allow exiles back into the city, and reduce their navy to only twelve vessels, surrendering all remaining ones to the Spartans. The Athenians were also to recraft their government on one dictated by the Spartans and to submit to Sparta in both "peace and war,” recalling their ambassadors from other city states.

=== Formation of the Thirty ===
The reason the Thirty were elected was to draft new laws and reform the Athenian constitution. To reform their laws as the Spartans instructed, Athens appointed five ephors to organize all voting through the phylarchoi, the tribal council representing the eleven tribes of Athens. The Ecclesia split into different factions on what the new government should be, with some favoring an oligarchic model while Theramenes became the de facto leader of those who wanted a democratic system. The debate led to deadlock and the Spartans intervened and demanded that the Athenians appoint Thirty men to oversee the drafting of new laws and a new constitution. It was determined that Theramenes would choose ten, the five Ephors would choose ten, and the Ecclesia would choose the final ten. The final Thirty selected men were tasked with drawing up the laws under which they would govern.

== Members of the Thirty ==
The names of the Thirty are listed by Xenophon:

- Aeschines of Athens, of the Kekropis tribe (not the famous orator)
- Anaetius
- Aresias
- Aristoteles (also a member of the Four Hundred and mentioned in Plato's Parmenides; not the philosopher, born twenty years later)
- Chaereleos
- Charicles, son of Apollodorus
- Chremo
- Cleomedes, son of Lycomedes
- Critias
- Diocles
- Dracontides
- Erasistratus of Acharnae
- Eratosthenes (not the well-known scholar)
- Eucleides
- Eumathes
- Hiero
- Hippolochus
- Hippomachus
- Melobius
- Mnesilochus
- Mnesitheides
- Onomacles
- Peison
- Phaedrias
- Pheido
- Polychares
- Sophocles (an Athenian orator, not the playwright)
- Theogenes
- Theognis
- Theramenes, son of Hagnon, of the tribe Pandionis, in the deme of Steiria

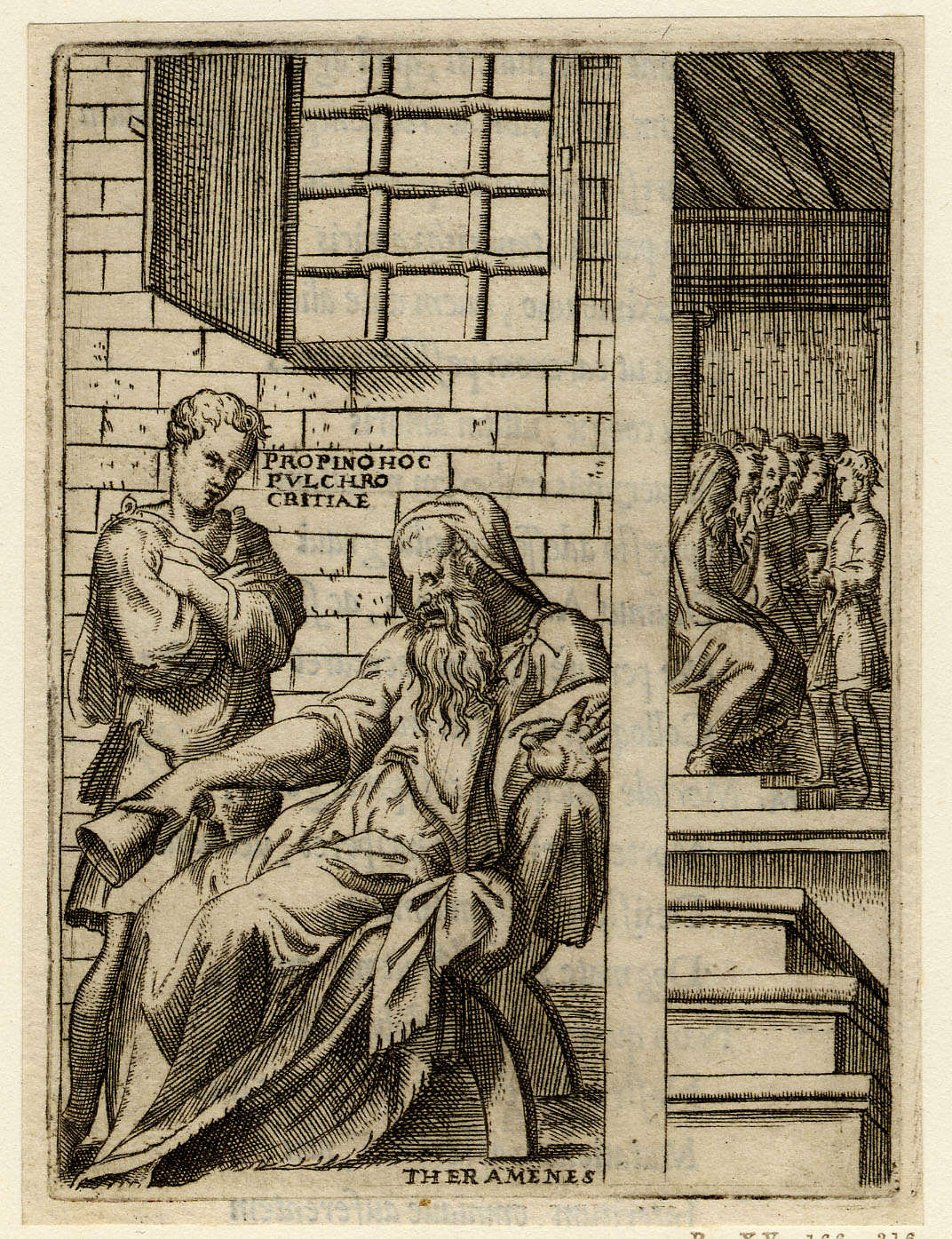
16th century engraving of Theramenes seated next to a young man emptying a flask.

== The rule of the Thirty ==
With Spartan support, the Thirty established an interim government in Athens. They reestablished the Boule, a council composed of 501 members. They appointed other officials, including 10 men who would rule the port town of Piraeus on behalf of the Thirty, and hired 300 mastigophoroi, whip bearers who would act as a police force. The Thirty oversaw trials in the Boule against Athenian leaders who had opposed the peace with Sparta and sentenced them to death. They then tried and executed a number of "undesirables" within Athens. Around this time, Thirty members Aeschines and Aristoteles travelled to Sparta and met with Lysander, requesting that a Spartan garrison be stationed in Athens. Lysander dispatched a garrison to the city, with the Thirty stating that it was a temporary measure until they finished their trials against criminals, but members of the Thirty started using Spartan soldiers as personal bodyguards in the city.

=== Legal reforms ===
The Thirty delayed revising the Athenian constitution, only enacting some legal reforms, and ruled Athens themselves, similar to the Spartan Gerousia. They limited citizenship and the right "to share in the government" to only 3,000 selected Athenians. These hand-selected individuals had the right to carry weapons, to have a jury trial, and to reside within city limits. The list of the selected 3,000 was constantly revised. Although little is known about these 3,000 men, for a complete record was never documented, Krentz believes that the Thirty appointed these select few as the only men the Thirty could find who were devotedly loyal to their regime.

Led by Critias, the Thirty Tyrants presided over a reign of terror in which they executed, murdered, and exiled hundreds of Athenians, seizing their possessions afterward. Both Isocrates and Aristotle (the latter in the Athenian Constitution) have reported that the Thirty executed 1,500 people without trial. Critias, a former pupil of Socrates, has been described as "the first Robespierre" because of his cruelty and inhumanity; he evidently aimed to end democracy, regardless of the human cost. The Thirty removed criminals as well as many ordinary citizens whom they considered "unfriendly" to the new regime for expressing support for democracy. One of their targets was one of their own, Theramenes, whom Xenophon depicts as revolted by Critias' excessive violence and injustice and trying to oppose him. Critias accused Theramenes of conspiracy and treason and then forced him to drink hemlock. Many wealthy citizens were executed simply so the oligarchs could confiscate their assets, which were then distributed among the Thirty and their supporters. They also hired 300 "lash-bearers,” or whip-bearing men to intimidate Athenian citizens.

=== Battle of Munychia ===
The Thirty's regime was not met with much overt opposition, although many Athenians disliked the new form of government. Those who did not approve of the new laws could either fight, risking exile or execution, or accept the Thirty's rule. Some supporters of democracy chose to fight and were exiled, among them Thrasybulus, a trierarch in the Athenian navy and noted supporter of democratic government. The uprising that overthrew the Thirty in 403 BC was orchestrated by a group of exiles led by Thrasybulus. Critias was killed in the fighting at the doors of Athens.

== Aftermath ==
The Thirty Tyrants' brief reign was characterized by violence and corruption. Historian Sian Lewis argues that the violence and brutality the Thirty carried out in Athens was necessary to transition Athens from a democracy to an oligarchy. However, the more violent the Thirty's regime became, the more opposition they faced.

The increased level of opposition ultimately led to the overthrow of the Thirty's regime by Thrasybulus' rebel forces. After the revolution, Athens needed to decide the best way to govern the liberated city-state and to reconcile the atrocities committed by the Thirty. It was decided to give amnesty to all of the members of the selected 3,000, except for the Thirty themselves, the Eleven (a group of prison magistrates appointed by lot who reported directly to the Thirty), and the ten who ruled in Piraeus (directly appointed by the Thirty).

=== Restoring Athenian democracy ===
Ending the reign of the Thirty, the Spartan king Pausanias went to Attica and created a treaty known as the 'Amnesty of 403'. The 'Amnesty of 403' restored democratic power in Athens and pardoned everyone. This excluded the Thirty, Eleven, and Ten who ruled in Peiraeus, who were exiled. This treaty also allowed people to move to Eleusis if they felt unsafe because of the democratic rule in Athens. Peiraeus and Mounichia were also placed under the democratic rule of Athens. This peace treaty between Athens and Peiraeus reverted Athens back to a democratic government.

== Sources of the Thirty ==
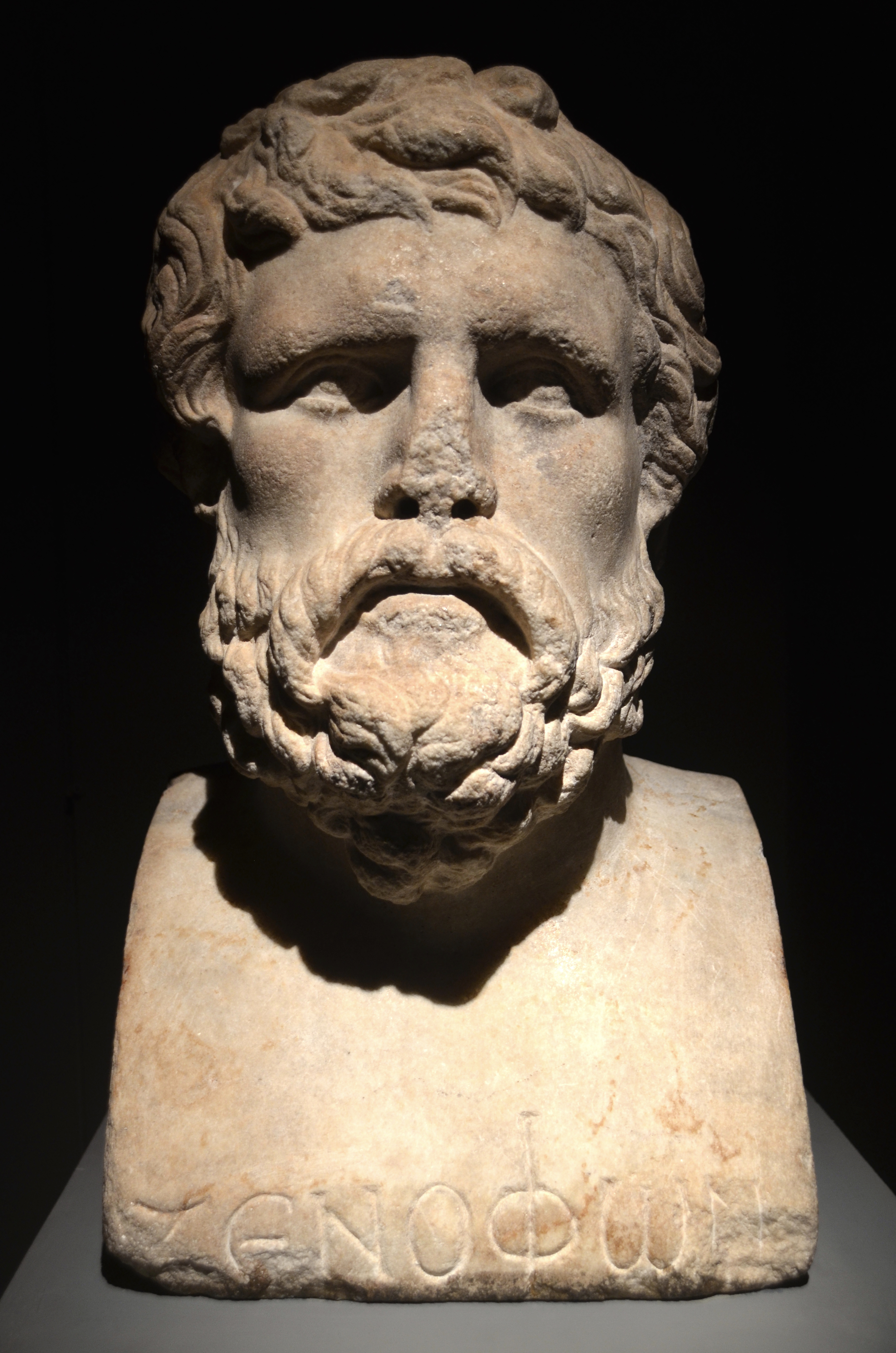
Marble bust of Xenophon of Athens (l. 430 to c. 354 BC), dated to 120 CE. Bibliotheca Alexandrina

Xenophon, in his book Hellenica, (in the second book, sections II.3.11-III.1.1,) writes about the rule of the Thirty Tyrants. His description focused on three people, Critias, Theramenes, and Thrasybulus. The two main events Xenophon wrote about were the conflict between Critias and Theramenes and Thrasybulus's uprising.

Plato, in the opening portion of his Seventh Letter (the authenticity of which is questioned by several 20th century scholars), recounts the rule of the Thirty Tyrants during his youth. He explains that following the revolution, fifty-one men became rulers of a new government, with a specific group of thirty in charge of the public affairs of Athens. Ten of the fifty-one were to rule the city, and eleven were sent to rule Piraeus. Plato corroborates the general consensus found in other sources: the rule of the Thirty was "reviled as it was by many." The rule of the Thirty made the former democracy resemble a golden age in comparison. Plato also includes an account of the interaction between Socrates and the Thirty.

In the Republic, Plato mentions Lysias, one of the men from Athens who escaped the Thirty's reign of terror. Lysias' brother Polemarchus "fell victim to the Thirty Tyrants."

In "On the Tranquility of the Mind", Seneca discusses the Athenians and the Thirty Tyrants in regards to the role of Socrates.

== Socrates and the Thirty ==
Due to their desire to remain in complete control over Athens, the Thirty sought to exile or kill anyone who outwardly opposed their regime. Socrates remained in the city through this period, which caused the public to associate him with the Thirty and may have contributed to his eventual death sentence, especially since Critias had been his student.

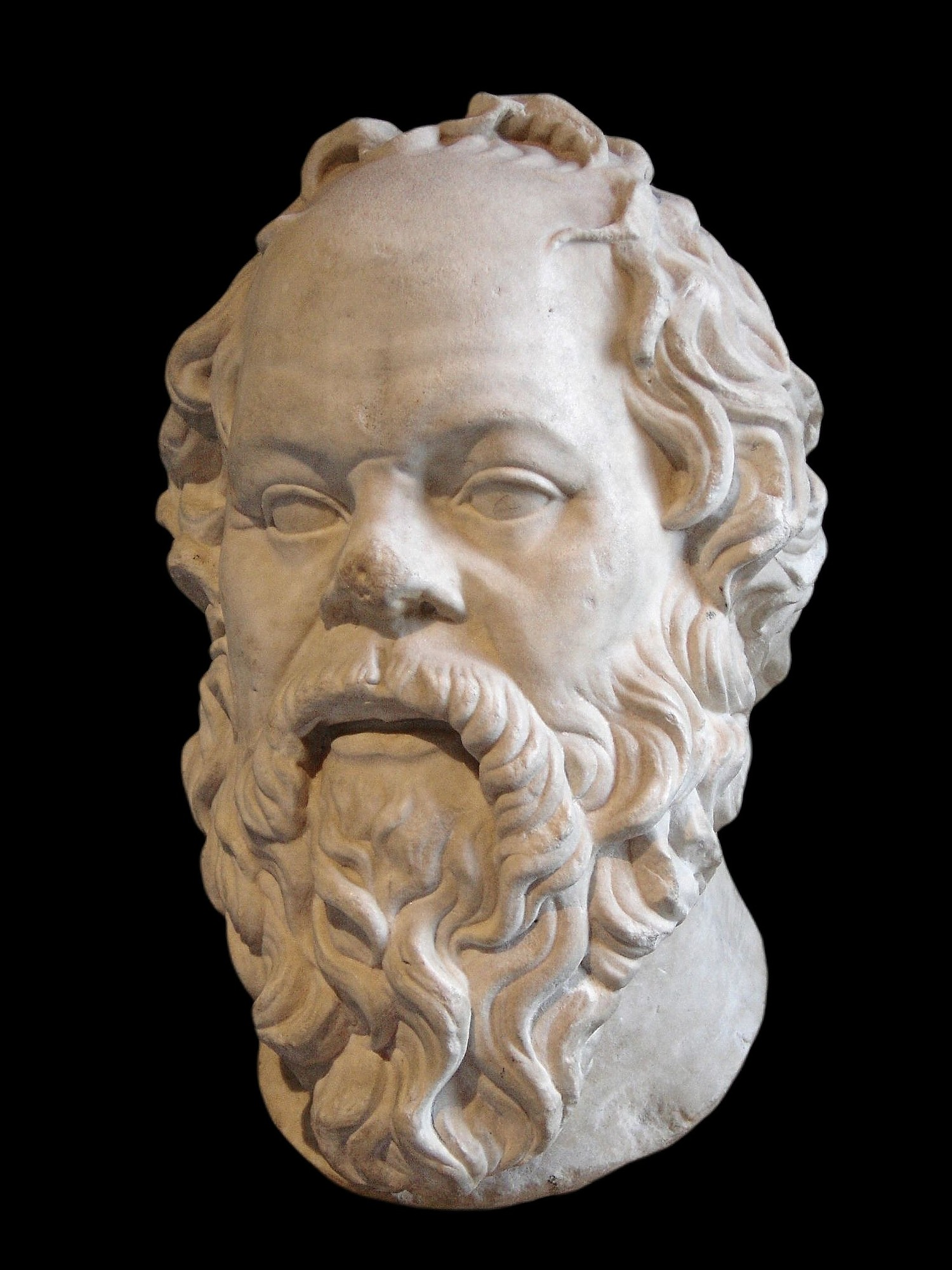
Portrait of Socrates. Marble, Roman artwork (1st century), perhaps a copy of a lost bronze statue made by Lysippos

In Plato's Apology, Socrates recounts an incident in which the Thirty once ordered him (and four other men) to bring before them Leon of Salamis, a man known for his justice and upright character, for execution. While the other four men obeyed, Socrates refused, not wanting to partake in the guilt of the executioners. However, he did not attempt to warn or save Leon of Salamis. By disobeying, Socrates may have been placing his own life in jeopardy, and he claimed it was only the disbanding of the oligarchy soon afterward that saved his life.

When the oligarchy came into power, the Thirty Commissioners, in their turn, summoned me and four others to the Round Chamber and instructed us to go and fetch Leon of Salamis from his home for execution. This was, of course, only one of many instances in which they issued such instructions, their object being to implicate as many people as possible in their crimes. On this occasion, however, I again made it clear, not by my words but by my actions, that the attention I paid to death was zero (if that is not too unrefined a claim); but that I gave all my attention to avoiding doing anything unjust or unholy. As powerful as it was, the government did not terrify me into doing a wrong action. When we came out of the rotunda, the other four went to Salamis and arrested Leon, but I simply went home.

Later on, in his Seventh Letter, Plato describes the interaction between the Thirty and Socrates from his own point of view:

They tried to send a friend of mine, the aged Socrates, whom I should scarcely scruple to describe as the most upright man of that day, with some other persons to carry off one of the citizens by force to execution, in order that, whether he wished it, or not, he might share the guilt of their conduct; but he would not obey them, risking all consequences in preference to becoming a partner in their iniquitous deeds.

The Italian historian Luciano Canfora has inferred that another of Socrates' students, Xenophon, might have played an important part in the rule of the Thirty, as one of the two commanders of the cavalry, which were the Thirty's militia. Indeed, in his book Hipparchos (Commander of the cavalry), Xenophon mentions just one of the commanders (there were always two), only to revile him, while never mentioning the other.

In his Memorabilia (Bk 1, Ch 2), Xenophon reports a contentious confrontation between Socrates and the Thirty, Critias included. Socrates is summoned before the group and ordered not to instruct or speak to anyone, whereupon Socrates mocks the order by asking sarcastically whether he will be allowed to ask to buy food in the marketplace. Xenophon uses the episode to illustrate both Socrates' own critique of the slaughtering of Athenian citizens by the Thirty, as well as make the case that the relationship between Critias and Socrates had significantly deteriorated by the time Critias obtained power.

== Bibliography ==
- Charles D. Hamilton, Sparta's Bitter Victories: Politics and Diplomacy in the Corinthian War, Ithaca, Cornell University Press, 1979. ISBN 978-0-8014-1158-8.
- Bultrighini, U. Maledetta democrazia: Studi su Crizia (Alessandria, 1999).
- Bugh, Glenn Richard, and issuing body Center for Hellenic Studies. “The Year of the Thirty Tyrants.” In The Horsemen of Athens, 120-53. Course Book. Princeton, New Jersey: Princeton University Press, 1988. https://doi.org/10.1515/9781400859757.
- Joyce, Christopher J. “The Athenian Reconciliation in Modern Scholarship.” In Amnesty and Reconciliation in Late Fifth-Century Athens : The Rule of Law under Restored Democracy, 1-37. 1st ed. Edinburgh: Edinburgh University Press, 2023. https://doi.org/10.1515/9781399506366 .
- Krentz, Peter. The Thirty at Athens. Ithaca, N.Y.: Cornell University Press, 1982. Print. (hardcover ISBN 0801414504)
- Linder, Doug. "The Trial of Socrates: An Account". N.p., 2002. Web. 1 May 2014.
- Németh, G. Kritias und die Dreißig Tyrannen: Untersuchungen zur Politik und Prosopographie der Führungselite in Athen 404/403 v.Chr. (Stuttgart, 2006).
- Phillips, David. “PART ONE: THE THIRTY TYRANTS.” In Athenian Political Oratory, 21–25. United Kingdom: Routledge, 2004. https://doi.org/10.4324/9780203335109-7.
- Plato, and Hugh Tredennick. "Apology". The Last Days of Socrates. Harmondsworth: Penguin, 1969.
- Plato. Plato in Twelve Volumes, Vol. 7 translated by R.G. Bury. Cambridge, MA: Harvard University Press; London, William Heinemann Ltd. 1966.
- Rhodes, P. A History of the Classical Greek World: 478-323 BC (Blackwell, 2006).
- Usher, S. "Xenophon, Critias and Theramenes" in: JHS 88 (1968) 128–135.
- Waterfield, Robin. Why Socrates Died: Dispelling the Myths. W. W. Norton & Company, 2009.
- Wolpert, Andrew. Remembering Defeat: Civil War and Civic Memory in Ancient Athens. Baltimore: Johns Hopkins University Press, 2002 (hardcover ISBN 0-8018-6790-8)
- Wolpert, Andrew. “The Violence of the Thirty Tyrants.” In Ancient Tyranny, 213–23. Edinburgh: Edinburgh University Press, 2022. https://doi.org/10.1515/9780748626434-019.
- Xenophon. Hellenika II. 3.11-IV. 2.8. Edited by Peter Krentz. Warminster, England: Aris & Phillips, 1995.
