= Anaumachiou graphe =

Anaumachiou Graphe (Ancient Greek: ἀναυμαχίου γραφή) was a legal procedure in ancient Athens used to impeach a trierarch (an officer responsible for a warship) who failed to engage in battle while the rest of the fleet was involved in action. This form of impeachment was a part of a broader set of legal actions related to military duty and conduct, such as astrateias (ἀστρατείας ; failure to serve in the military), deilias (δειλίας; cowardice), liponautiou (λιποναυτίου; desertion from the navy), and lipotaxiou (λιποταξίου; desertion from military service).

In cases like these, the strategoi (generals) were the presiding judges, as they were responsible for overseeing military conduct and ensuring that Athenian citizens upheld their military obligations.

== Punishment and penalties ==
The penalty for a conviction under anaumachiou graphe was atimia, but it did not include the confiscation of the convicted individual's property.

In contrast, more severe offenses, such as deilias (cowardice) or lipotaxiou (desertion), resulted in the confiscation of the offender’s property in addition to the loss of civic rights, as mentioned by Lysias in his speech Against Alcibiades.
