= Ostracism =

Democratic procedure for expelling citizens

Ostracism (Greek: ὀστρακισμός, ostrakismos) was an Athenian democratic procedure in which any citizen could be expelled from the city-state of Athens for ten years. While some instances clearly expressed popular anger at the citizen, ostracism was often used preemptively as a way of neutralizing someone thought to be a threat to the state or a potential tyrant. The word ostracism continues to be used for various forms of shunning.

== Procedure ==
The term ostracism derives from the pottery sherds used as voting tokens, called ostraka (singular: ostrakon; ὄστρακον). Broken pottery, abundant and virtually free, served as a kind of scrap paper (in contrast to papyrus, which was imported from Egypt as a high-quality writing surface, and too costly to be disposable).

Each year Athenians were asked in the assembly whether they wished to hold an ostracism. The question was put in the sixth of the ten months used for state business under the democracy (January or February in the modern Gregorian calendar). According to Philochorus, the process of ostracism (1) was a two-stage process, (2) was open to all Athens citizens, (3) was overseen by outside officials, (4) must meet a specific quorum, and (5) regulated penalties.

A majority of citizens must agree to start the procedure of ostracism. If they did, an ostracism would be held two months later. In a section of the agora set off and suitably barriered called the perischoinisma (περισχοίνισμα), citizens gave the names of those they wished to be ostracized to a scribe, as many of them were illiterate, and they were scratched on pottery shards. The shards were piled up facing down, so the votes would remain anonymous. Ostracism served as a political tool to eliminate rivals. It reflected the Athenians' belief in the importance of civic engagement and the power of collective decision-making. Nine Archontes and the council of the five hundred supervised the process while the Archontes counted the ostraka submitted and sorted the names into piles. The person whose pile contained the most ostraka would be banished, provided that a quorum was met. According to Plutarch, the ostracism was considered valid if the total number of votes cast was at least 6,000; according to a fragment of Philochorus, at least 6,000 votes had to be cast against the person who was to be banished. Plutarch's evidence for a quorum of 6,000 agrees with the number required for grants of citizenship in the next century and is generally preferred.

The person newly ostracized had ten days to leave the city. If he attempted to return, the penalty was death. The banished man's property was not confiscated and there was no loss of status. After ten years, he was allowed to return without stigma. It was possible for the assembly to recall an ostracized person ahead of time; before the Persian invasion of 479 BC, an amnesty was declared under which at least two ostracized leaders—Pericles' father, Xanthippus, and Aristides 'the Just'—are known to have returned. Similarly, Cimon, ostracized in 461 BC, was recalled during an emergency.

== History ==
Ostracism was not in use throughout the entire period of Athenian democracy (circa 506–322 BC), but only occurred in the fifth century BC. The standard account, found in Aristotle's Constitution of the Athenians 22.3, attributes the establishment to Cleisthenes, a pivotal reformer in the creation of the democracy. In that case, ostracism would have been in place from around 506 BC. The first victim of the practice was not expelled until 487 BC—nearly 20 years later. Over the course of the next 60 years some 12 or more individuals followed him. The list may not be complete. The list of known ostracisms is as follows:

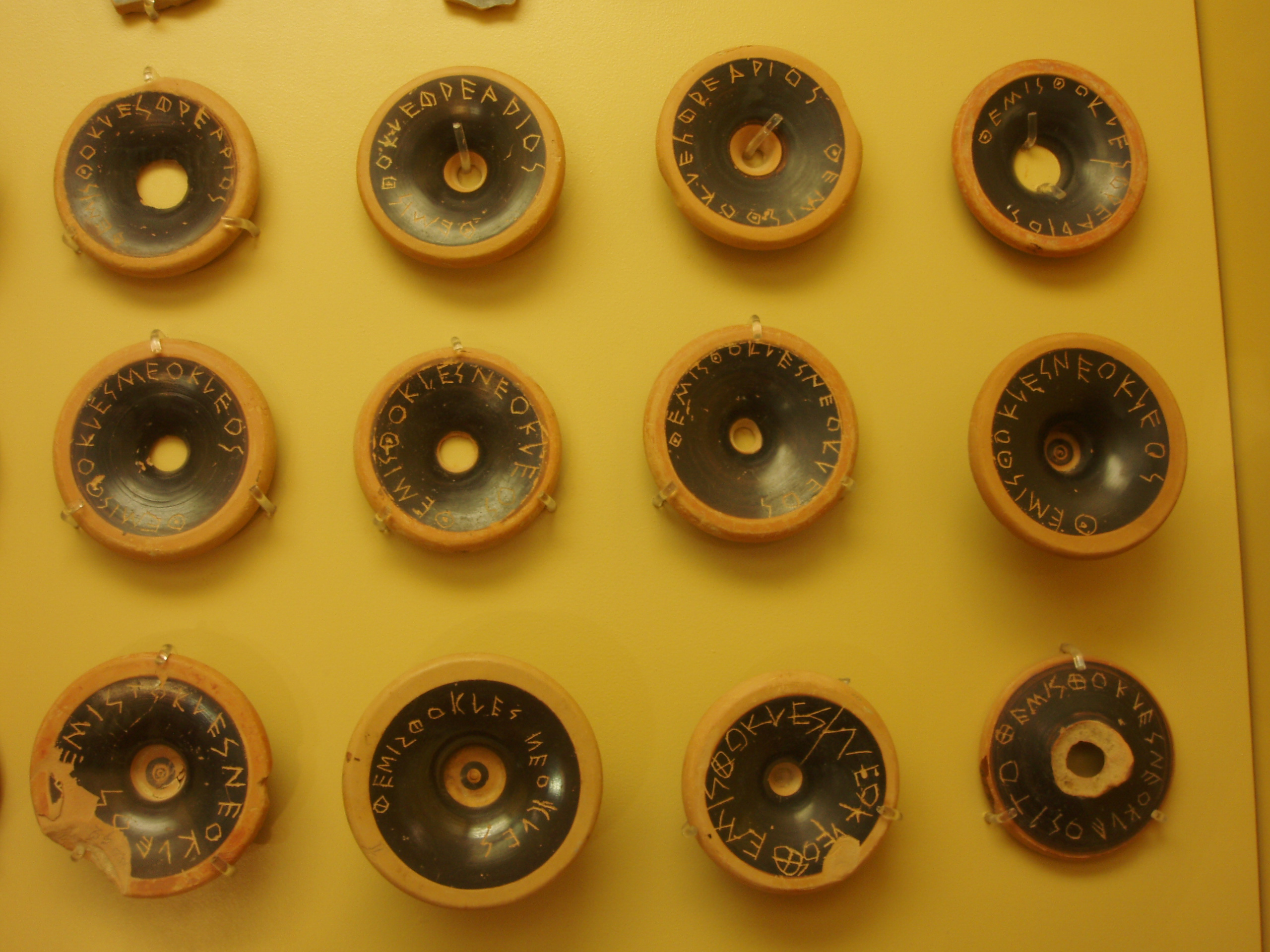
Ostraca from 482 BC voting in favor of ostracizing Themistocles

- 487 Hipparchos son of Charmos, a relative of the tyrant Peisistratos
- 486 Megacles son of Hippocrates; nephew of Cleisthenes (possibly ostracised twice)
- 485 Kallixenos nephew of Cleisthenes (not known for certain)
- 484 Xanthippus son of Ariphron, Pericles' father
- 482 Aristides son of Lysimachus
- 471 Themistocles son of Neocles (last possible year)
- 461 Cimon son of Miltiades
- 460 Alcibiades, father of Cleinias (possibly ostracised twice)
- 457 Menon son of Meneclides (less certain)
- 442 Thucydides son of Melesias
- 440s Callias son of Didymos (less certain)
- 440s Damon son of Damonides (less certain)
- 416 Hyperbolus son of Antiphanes (±1 year)

Around 12,000 political ostraka have been excavated in the Athenian agora and in the Kerameikos. The second victim, Cleisthenes' nephew Megacles, is named by 4647 of these, but for a second undated ostracism not listed above. The known ostracisms seem to fall into three distinct phases: the 480s BC, mid-century 461–443 BC and finally the years 417–415: this roughly correlates with the clustering of known expulsions, although Themistocles before 471 may count as an exception. This may suggest that ostracism fell in and out of fashion.

The last known ostracism was that of Hyperbolus in circa 417 BC. There is no sign of its use after the Peloponnesian War, when democracy was restored after the oligarchic coup of the Thirty had collapsed in 403 BC. However, while ostracism was not an active feature of the fourth-century version of democracy, it remained; the question was put to the assembly each year, but they did not wish to hold one.

== Distinction from other Athenian democratic processes ==
Ostracism was crucially different from Athenian law at the time; there was no charge and no defense could be mounted by the person expelled. The two stages of the procedure ran in the reverse order from that used under almost any trial system—it is as if a jury were first asked "Do you want to find someone guilty?", and subsequently asked "Whom do you wish to accuse?". The judicial framework is perhaps the institution's most peculiar feature: it can take place at most once a year, and only for one person. It resembles the Greek pharmakos or scapegoat—though in contrast, pharmakos generally ejected a lowly member of the community.

A further distinction between these two modes (and not obvious from a modern perspective) is that ostracism was an automatic procedure that required no initiative from any individual, with the vote simply occurring on the wish of the electorate—a diffuse exercise of power. By contrast, an Athenian trial needed the initiative of a particular citizen-prosecutor. While prosecution often led to a counterattack (or was a counterattack itself), no such response was possible in the case of ostracism as responsibility lay with the polity as a whole. In contrast to a trial, ostracism generally reduced political tension rather than increased it.

Although ten years of exile may have been challenging for Athenians, it was a lenient punishment compared to the sentences that courts could impose. When dealing with politicians held to be acting against the interests of the people, Athenian juries could inflict severe penalties such as death, unpayably large fines, confiscation of property, permanent exile, or loss of citizens' rights through atimia. Further, the elite Athenians who suffered ostracism were rich or noble men who had connections or xenoi in the wider Greek world and who, unlike genuine exiles, were able to access their income in Attica from abroad. In Plutarch, following the anti-democratic thought common in elite sources, people might be recalled early, thus being an example of the inconsistency of majoritarianism characteristic of Athenian democracy. However, ten years of exile usually resolved whatever had prompted the expulsion. Ostracism was a pragmatic measure; the concept of serving out the full sentence did not apply as it was a preventive measure, not a punitive one.

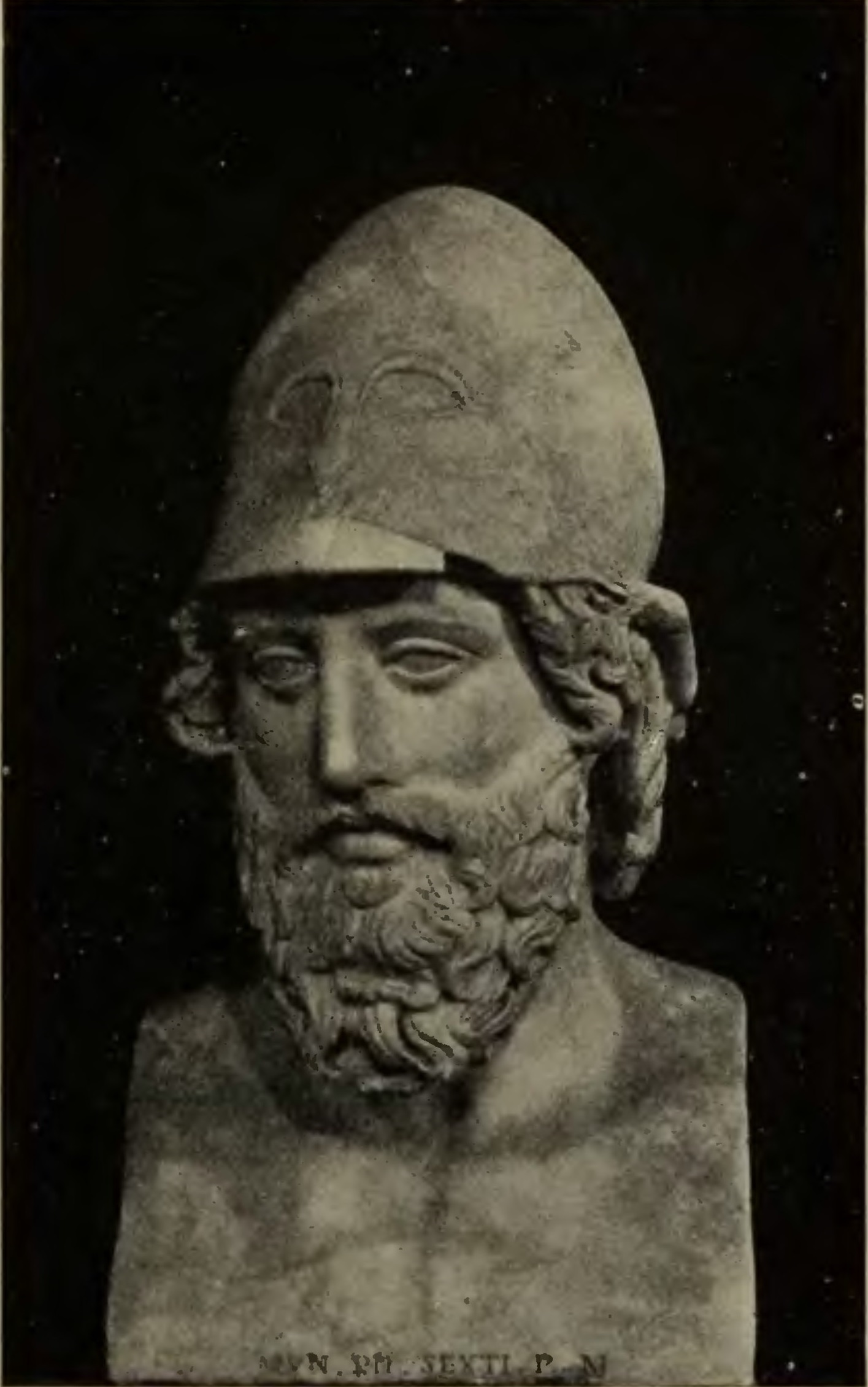
Bust of Themistocles, who was exiled via ostracism and fled to Argos around 471 or 472 BC, despite an impactful military career

An example of the practicalities of ostracism comes from the cache of 190 ostraka discovered dumped in a well next to the acropolis. From the handwriting, they appear to have been written by fourteen individuals and bear the name of Themistocles, ostracised before 471 BC, and were evidently meant for distribution to voters. This was not necessarily evidence of electoral fraud (being no worse than modern voting instruction cards), but their being dumped in the well may suggest that their creators wished to hide them. If so, these ostraka provide an example of organized groups attempting to influence the outcome of ostracisms. The two-month gap between the first and second phases would have allowed for such a campaign.

There is another interpretation, however, according to which these ostraka were prepared beforehand by enterprising businessmen who offered them for sale to citizens who could not easily inscribe the desired names for themselves or who simply wished to save time.

The two-month gap is a key feature in the institution, much as in elections under modern liberal democracies. It prevented the candidate for expulsion being chosen out of immediate anger, although an Athenian general such as Cimon would have not wanted to lose a battle the week before such a second vote. It opened a period for discussion (or perhaps agitation), whether informally in daily talk or public speeches before the Athenian assembly or Athenian courts. (Note: Oration IV of Andocides purports itself to be speech urging the ostracism of Alcibiades in 415 BC, but it is probably not authentic.) In this process a consensus, or rival consensuses, might emerge.

== Purpose ==
Because ostracism was carried out by thousands of people over many decades of an evolving political situation and culture, it did not serve one monolithic purpose. Observations can be made about the outcomes, as well as the initial purpose for which it was created.

The first instance of people ostracized in the decade after the defeat of the first Persian invasion at Marathon in 490 BC were related or connected to the tyrant Peisistratos, who had controlled Athens for 36 years up to 527 BC. After his son Hippias was deposed with Spartan help in 510 BC, the family sought refuge with the Persians. Nearly twenty years later Hippias landed with an invasion force at Marathon. Tyranny and Persian aggression were paired threats facing the new democratic regime at Athens, and ostracism was used against both.

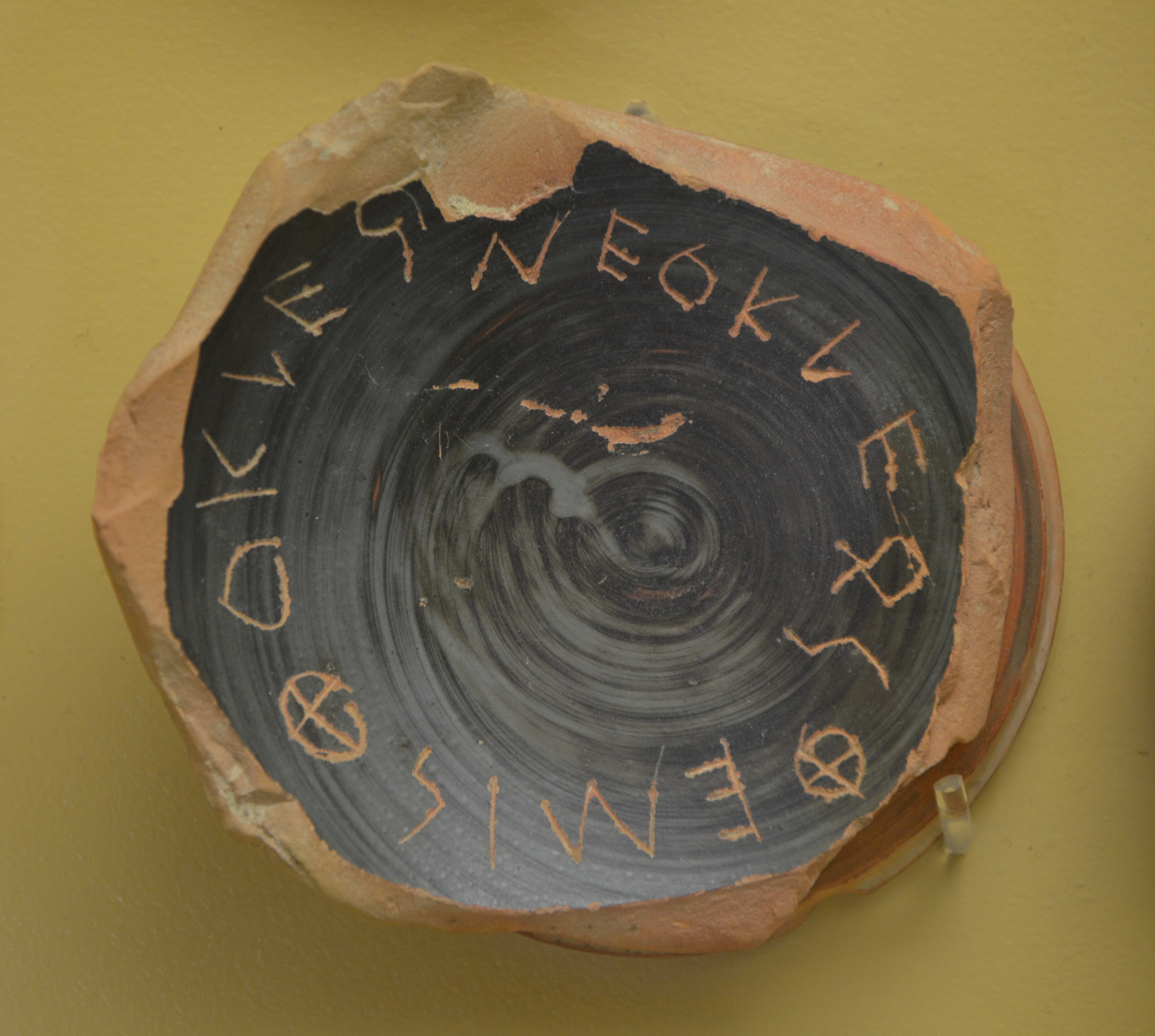
Example of a Greek Ostracon, suggesting the Ostracization of Themistocles, from the Stoà of Attalus Museum (482 BC)

Tyranny and democracy had arisen at Athens out of clashes between regional and factional groups organized around politicians, including Cleisthenes. As a reaction, in many of its features the democracy strove to reduce the role of factions as the focus of citizen loyalties. Ostracism may have been intended to work in the same to similar ends: by temporarily decapitating a faction, it could help defuse confrontations that threatened the order of the State.

In later decades when the threat of tyranny was remote, ostracism seems to have been used to decide between radically opposed policies. For instance, in 443 BC Thucydides, son of Melesias (not to be confused with the historian of the same name) was ostracized. He led an aristocratic opposition to Athenian imperialism and in particular to Pericles' building program on the acropolis, which was funded by taxes created for the wars against the Achaemenid Empire. By expelling Thucydides the Athenian people sent a clear message about the direction of Athenian policy. Similar but controversial claims have been made about the ostracism of Cimon in 461 BC.

The motives of individual voting citizens cannot be known. Many of the surviving ostraka name people otherwise unattested. They may well be just someone the submitter disliked, and voted for in a moment of private spite. Some ostraka bear the word "Limos" (hunger) instead of a human name. As such, it may be seen as a secular, civic variant of Athenian curse tablets, studied in scholarly literature under the Latin name defixiones, where small dolls were wrapped in lead sheets written with curses and then buried, sometimes stuck through with nails for good measure.

In one anecdote about Aristides, known as "the Just", who was ostracised in 482, an illiterate citizen, not recognising him, asked him to write the name Aristides on his ostrakon. When Aristides asked why, the man replied it was because he was sick of hearing him being called "the Just". Perhaps merely the sense that someone had become too arrogant or prominent was enough to get someone's name onto an ostrakon. Ostracism rituals could have also been an attempt to dissuade people from covertly committing murder or assassination of intolerable or emerging individuals of power so as to create an open arena or outlet for those harbouring primal frustrations and urges or political motivations. The solution for murder, in Gregory H. Padowitz's theory, would then be "ostracism" which would ultimately be beneficial for all parties—the ostracised individual would live and get a second chance and society would be spared feuds, civil war, political tensions and/or murder.

== Fall into disuse ==
The last ostracism, that of Hyperbolos in or near 417 BC, is narrated by Plutarch in three separate lives: Hyperbolos is pictured urging the people to expel one of his rivals, but they, Nicias and Alcibiades, laying aside their hostility for a moment, use their influence to have him ostracised instead. According to Plutarch, the people then become disgusted with ostracism and abandoned the procedure forever.

In part ostracism lapsed as a procedure at the end of the fifth century because it was replaced by the graphe paranomon, a regular court action under which a much larger number of politicians might be targeted, instead of just one a year as with ostracism, and with greater severity.

It may already seemed like an anachronism as factional alliances organised around important men became less significant and power was more specifically located in the interaction of the individual speaker with the power of the assembly and the courts. The threat to the democratic system in the late fifth century came not from tyranny but from oligarchic coups, threats of which became prominent after two brief seizures of power, in 411 BC by "the Four Hundred" and in 404 BC by "the Thirty", which were not dependent on single powerful individuals. Ostracism was not an effective defence against the oligarchic threat and it was not so used.

== Analogues ==
Other cities are known to have set up forms of ostracism on the Athenian model, namely Megara, Miletos, Argos and Syracuse, Sicily. In the last of these it was referred to as petalismos, because the names were written on olive leaves. Little is known about these institutions. Furthermore, pottery shards identified as ostraka have been found in Chersonesos Taurica, leading historians to the conclusion that a similar institution existed there as well, in spite of the silence of the ancient records on that count.

A similar modern practice is the recall election, in which the electoral body removes its representation from an elected officer.

Unlike under modern voting procedures, the Athenians did not have to adhere to a strict format for the inscribing of ostraka. Many extant ostraka show that it was possible to write expletives, short epigrams or cryptic injunctions beside the name of the candidate without invalidating the vote. For example:

- Kallixenes, son of Aristonimos, "the traitor"
- Archen, "lover of foreigners"
- Agasias, "the donkey"
- Megacles, "the adulterer"

== Modern usage ==
Ostracism is evident in several animal species, as well as in modern human interactions. The social psychologist Kipling Williams defines ostracism as "any act or acts of ignoring and excluding of an individual or groups by an individual or a group" without necessarily involving "acts of verbal or physical abuse".

Williams suggests that the most common form of ostracism is silent treatment, wherein refusing to communicate with a person effectively ignores and excludes them.

=== Computer networks ===
Ostracism in the context of computer networks (such as the Internet) is termed "cyberostracism". In email communication, in particular, it is relatively easy to engage in silent treatment, in the form of "unanswered emails" or "ignored emails". Being ostracised on social media is seen to be threatening to the fundamental human needs of belonging, self-esteem, control and meaningful existence. Cyber-rejection (receiving "dislikes") caused more threat to the need of belonging and self-esteem, and lead to social withdrawal. Cyber-ostracism (being ignored or receiving fewer "likes") conversely lead to more prosocial behavior. Ostracism is thought to be associated with social media disorder.

=== Reactions ===
Williams and his colleagues have charted responses to ostracism in some five thousand cases, and found two distinctive patterns of response. The first is increased group-conformity, in a quest for re-admittance; the second is to become more provocative and hostile to the group, seeking attention rather than acceptance.

=== Age ===
Older adults report experiencing ostracism less frequently, with a particular dip being around the age of retirement. Regardless of age, ostracism is strongly associated with negative emotions, reduced life satisfaction and dysfunctional social behaviour.

=== Whistleblowing ===
Research suggests that ostracism is a common retaliatory strategy used by organizations in response to whistleblowing. Kipling Williams, in a survey on US whistleblowers, found that all respondents reported post-whistleblowing ostracism. Alexander Brown similarly found that post-whistleblowing ostracism is a common response, and indeed describes ostracism as a form of "covert" reprisal, as it is normally so difficult to identify and investigate.

=== Ghahr and Âshti ===
Ghahr and Âshti is a culture-specific Iranian form of personal shunning, most frequently of another family member in Iran. While modern Western concepts of ostracism are based upon enforcing conformity within a societally-recognized group, Ghahr is a private, family-orientated affair of conflict or display of anger that is never disclosed to the public at large, as to do so would be a breach of Iranian social etiquette.

Ghahr is avoidance of a lower-ranking family member who has committed a perceived insult. It is one of several ritualised social customs of Iranian culture.

Gozasht means 'tolerance, understanding and a desire or willingness to forgive' and is an essential component of Ghahr and Âshti for the psychological needs of closure and cognition.

== See also ==
- Cancel culture
- Contempt
- Isolation to facilitate abuse
- McCarthyism
- Petalism
- Relegatio
- Social control
- Witch-hunt
