= Nomothetai =

Legislative panels in fourth-century BCE Athens

Nomothetai (νομοθέται, singular: νομοθέτης, nomothetēs, "lawgivers") were lawmaking panels in classical Athens that approved or repealed laws (nomoi). They were established after the restoration of democracy in 403 BCE to separate the passing by the citizen Assembly (Ekklesia) of temporary decrees from the making of permanent laws.

They continued through the fourth century BCE but ended with the end of democracy after Athens lost its independence following the Lamian War (322 BCE).

== History ==
After the overthrow of the Thirty Tyrants, Athens in 403 BCE restored democracy. One change made was to introduce nomothetai to stop arbitrary legislation. Before this reform, apart from decrees (psephisma) not being able to contradict existing laws (nomos), little distinction existed between how they were passed.

Inscriptions support this distinction: laws use the phrase dedokthai tois nomothetais ("resolved by the lawgivers"), while decrees read dedokthai tōi dēmōi ("resolved by the people").

== Membership ==
According to Mogens H. Hansen, the nomothetai were selected from the 6,000 sworn jurors (dikastai) who took the Heliastic Oath. Passages in Against Timocrates (24.20–23) refer to "those who have sworn the Heliastic Oath," suggesting the nomothetai acted as a legislative court. Other scholars, suggest, however, that the nomothetai were a special meeting of the citizen Assembly convened for lawmaking. Aeschines (Against Ctesiphon 3.39) describes the prytaneis summoning the Assembly "as nomothetai," implying that the same citizens could act as lawgivers under different procedures. More recently, the idea they were jurors has been reaffirmed.

The nomothetai were presided over by proedroi (chairmen) and an epistates (president). They voted by show of hands (cheirotonia), unlike jury courts, which used secret ballots.

== Lawmaking process ==
Reconstructing the procedure of nomothesia—the making or repeal of laws—is difficult, since Demosthenes' speeches dealing with them have been identified to include later additions. However, other court speeches and political orations suggest the process had the following stages:

- The Assembly voted on whether new laws were needed (diacheirotonia).
- Approved proposals were displayed publicly on whitened boards (leukomata) in the Agora, near the Monument of the Eponymous Heroes (Against Leptines 20.94).
- The proposals were read aloud and discussed in later meetings.
- At the third Assembly, the nomothetai were appointed.
- Advocates (synegoroi) were chosen to defend existing laws proposed for repeal (Against Timocrates 24.36).
- Any conflicting laws had to be repealed before new ones could take effect (Against Leptines 20.93).

== Related procedures ==
=== Inspection law ===
According to Aeschines (Against Ctesiphon 3.38–40), an annual "Inspection Law" required the Thesmothetai (junior archons) to check existing laws for contradictions. If inconsistencies were found, the prytaneis convened the Assembly as nomothetai to decide which law should remain in force.

=== Judicial review ===
Laws passed by the nomothetai could be challenged in court through a graphē nomōn mē epitēdeion theinai ("indictment against an inexpedient law"). If the challenge succeeded, the law was annulled and the proposer could face fines, loss of civic rights (atimia), or other penalties.

After 403 BCE, this review applied to laws, while decrees remained subject to the older graphē paranomōn ("indictment for an illegal proposal").

=== Laws concerning individuals ===
When a proposed law applied to a specific person (nomos ep' andri), such as a grant of citizenship, the Assembly first had to approve it by secret ballot with at least 6,000 votes before referring it to the nomothetai.

== Hellenistic period ==
The nomothetai disappeared after Athens' defeat in the Lamian War (322 BCE). Under the oligarchic regime of Demetrius of Phalerum (317–307 BCE), legislative review was handled by officials known as nomophylakes ("guardians of the laws"), who examined proposals before debate. The nomothetai briefly reappeared after democracy was restored in 307 BCE but are not mentioned after the early third century BCE.

== See also ==
- Ancient Greek law
- Graphe paranomon
- Law court (ancient Athens)
