= Exile =

Event by which a person is forced away from home

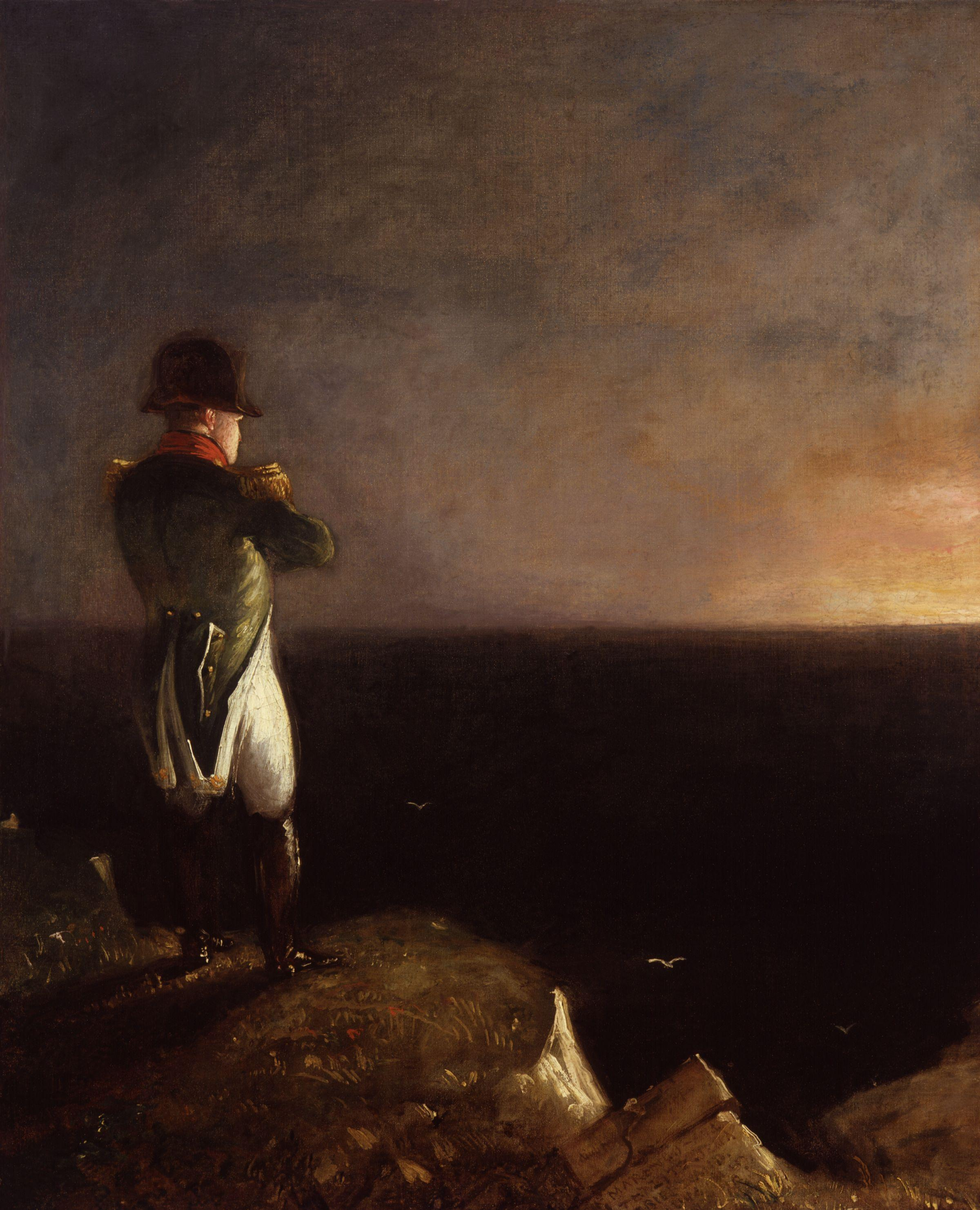
Painting of Napoleon in exile on Saint Helena

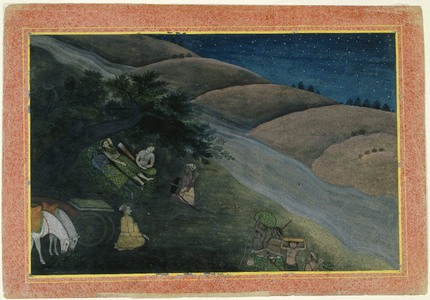
The First Night in Exile – This painting comes from a series illustrating the Ramayana, a Hindu epic poem. It depicts prince Rama, who is wrongly exiled from his father's kingdom, accompanied only by his wife and brother.

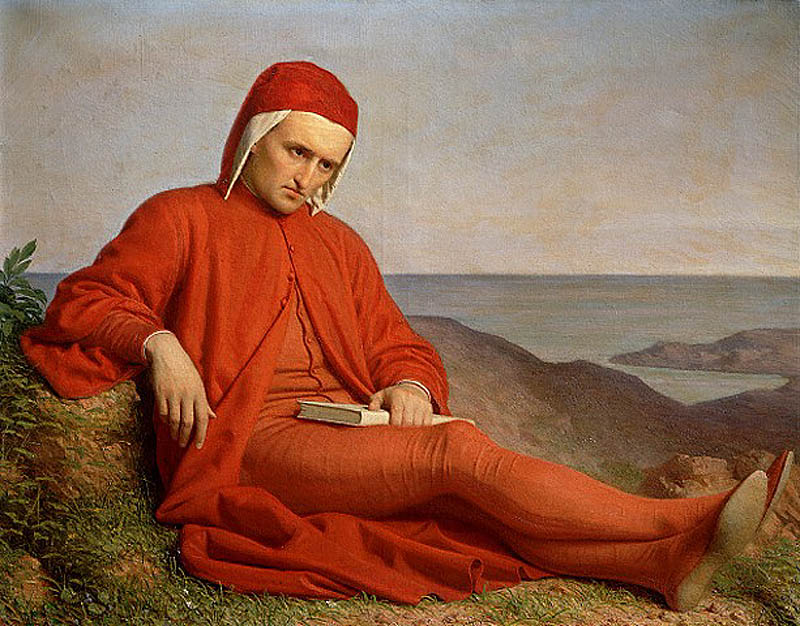
Dante in Exile by Domenico Petarlini

Exile or banishment is primarily penal expulsion from one's native country, and secondarily expatriation or prolonged absence from one's homeland under either the compulsion of circumstance or the rigors of some high purpose. Usually persons and peoples suffer exile, but sometimes social entities like institutions (e.g. the papacy or a government) are forced from their homeland.

In Roman law, exsilium denoted both voluntary exile and banishment as a capital punishment alternative to death. Deportation was forced exile, and entailed the lifelong loss of citizenship and property. Relegation was a milder form of deportation, which preserved the subject's citizenship and property.

The term diaspora describes group exile, both voluntary and forced. "Government in exile" describes a government of a country that has relocated and argues its legitimacy from outside that country. Voluntary exile is often depicted as a form of protest by the person who claims it, to avoid persecution and prosecution (such as tax or criminal allegations), an act of shame or repentance, or isolating oneself to be able to devote time to a particular pursuit.

Article 9 of the Universal Declaration of Human Rights states that "No one shall be subjected to arbitrary arrest, detention or exile."

== For individuals ==
=== History ===
Banishment was used as a punishment in ancient societies such as Babylon, Greece and Rome. It is stipulated as the punishment for incest with one's daughter in the Code of Hammurabi, for manslaughter in Mosaic law, for murder in Athens according to Draco's homicide law, and for rape according to the ancient Indian text Manusmriti. A special form of banishment known as ostracism was practiced in Athens, in which citizens could vote for the expulsion of any citizen for ten years. Ostracism did not entail the loss of property or citizenship, and the ostracized person could return after ten years without disgrace or further penalty. Banishment was the punishment for a variety of offenses in Ancient Rome. In Roman law, exsilium denoted both voluntary exile and banishment as an alternative to capital punishment. When allowed as an alternative to death, it was accompanied by an administrative decree called interdictio aquae et ignis ("interdiction of water and fire"), which declared the offender an outlaw, allowing any person who encountered him or her within the borders of the country to kill him or her. During the Late Republic, there was consensus among the public and legislators to reduce the incidence of capital punishment by allowing condemned persons to go into voluntary exile. Deportation was forced exile, and entailed the lifelong loss of citizenship and property. Relegation was a milder form of deportation, which preserved the subject's citizenship and property. The Tang Code of 7th-century China lists a number of crimes punishable by banishment.

Exile was also imposed as a punishment in many societies in medieval Europe. Germanic peoples such as the Franks and Danes are known to have used it. In England, it can be traced back to the 12th century. At that time, a criminal could be allowed to claim sanctuary in a church; if they confessed to their crimes within forty days and took an oath to leave the country and not return without royal permission, they would be allowed to safely go into exile. This practice was abolished by King James I in 1623. Banishment was also a common punishment in the Netherlands: from 1650 to 1750, at least 97 percent of non-capital sentences passed in Amsterdam included some form of banishment. In 1597, the English parliament empowered magistrates to deport "rogues and vagabonds 'beyond the seas' ", and in 1615 James I permitted the pardoning of felons on condition of banishment to the Americas. However, it was only after the passing of the Transportation Act of 1718 that banishment to British colonies overseas, termed "transportation", began to be applied systematically as a punishment for serious crimes. Hundreds of convicts were transported annually to the colonies and sold as servants. About 50,000 people were subjected to the punishment throughout the 18th century, including more than two-thirds of all felons convicted at London's main criminal court, Old Bailey. The practice of transportation in Britain continued well into the 19th century. France also employed banishment to colonies as a punishment, but on a smaller scale than Britain; it was in use to a limited extent until the mid-20th century. The Russian Empire and Qing China used exile as a means to populate frontier territories. Prison colonies became obsolete as the amount of habitable unsettled territory in the world decreased, and prisons became the normal method for dealing with convicts.

Banishment was frequently used as a punishment in the Thirteen Colonies, but it fell into disfavor under the United States. There is no federal law in the United States controlling banishment as a punishment. In the case Cooper v. Telfair (1800), the US Supreme Court established that legislatures have the right to confiscate the property of and banish individuals who take up arms against the United States. At least one legal scholar has argued that this Supreme Court ruling "offered a definitive ruling on the legality of banishment." However, another scholar has argued that this reasoning cannot be easily used in the case of ordinary offenses, "where the security of the country is not at stake." Some US states allow intrastate banishment, although the practice is rare and its legality and constitutionality in many US jurisdictions has been described as "still an open question" by one scholar. Interstate banishment (i.e., expulsion from one US state to another) has been allowed in the United States only in isolated instances. The state of Georgia and Native American tribes are the two main users of banishment in the US, and often banish criminals from their tribal lands or judicial circuits.

=== International law and contemporary use ===
Denaturalization, or depriving a person of their citizenship, can be viewed as a modern form of banishment. Denaturalization does not necessarily result in an individual losing the right of legal residence in the country that revokes their citizenship, but it often does. Modern international law severely limits the circumstances under which a person can be deprived of their citizenship. Countries which permit the deprivation of citizenship after a criminal conviction for a serious offense include the Netherlands, Belgium, and France. Most states only allow the deprivation of citizenship if it will not cause the person to become stateless.

=== Exiled heads of state ===
In some cases the deposed head of state is allowed to go into exile following a coup or other change of government, allowing a more peaceful transition to take place or to escape justice.

=== Avoiding tax or legal matters ===
A wealthy citizen who moves to a jurisdiction with lower taxes is termed a tax exile. Creative people such as authors and musicians who achieve sudden wealth sometimes choose this. Examples include the British-Canadian writer Arthur Hailey, who moved to the Bahamas to avoid taxes following the runaway success of his novels Hotel and Airport, and the English rock band the Rolling Stones who, in the spring of 1971, owed more in taxes than they could pay and left Britain before the government could seize their assets. Members of the band all moved to France for a period of time where they recorded music for the album that came to be called Exile on Main Street, the Main Street of the title referring to the French Riviera. In 2012, Eduardo Saverin, one of the founders of Facebook, made headlines by renouncing his U.S. citizenship before his company's IPO. The dual Brazilian/U.S. citizen's decision to move to Singapore and renounce his citizenship spurred a bill in the U.S. Senate, the Ex-PATRIOT Act, which would have forced such wealthy tax exiles to pay a special tax in order to re-enter the United States.

In some cases a person voluntarily lives in exile to avoid legal issues, such as litigation or criminal prosecution. An example of this is Asil Nadir, who fled to the Turkish Republic of Northern Cyprus for 17 years rather than face prosecution in connection with the failed £1.7 bn company Polly Peck in the United Kingdom.

=== Avoiding violence or persecution, or in the aftermath of war ===
Examples include:

- Iraqi academics asked to return home "from exile" to help rebuild Iraq in 2009
- People undertaking a religious or civil liberties role in society may be forced into exile due to threat of persecution. For example, in Czechoslovakia, nuns were internally exiled to small villages along the northern border that had been stripped of their original German populations (such as Bílá Voda) following the Communist coup d'état of 1948.
- Thibaw Min and Supayalat were exiled to India after Third Anglo-Burmese War, named Pataw Mu.

=== Euphemism for convict ===
Exile, government man and assigned servant were all euphemisms used in the 19th century for convicts under sentence who had been transported from Britain to Australia.

== For groups, nations, and governments ==
=== Nation in exile ===
When a large group, or occasionally a whole people or nation is exiled, it can be said that this nation is in exile, or "diaspora". Nations that have been in exile for substantial periods include the Israelites by the Assyrian king Sargon II in 720 BCE, the Judeans who were deported by Babylonian king Nebuchadnezzar II in 586 BC, and the Jews following the destruction of the second Temple in Jerusalem in AD 70. Jewish prayers include a yearning to return to Jerusalem and the Land of Israel, such as "Next Year in Jerusalem".

After the Partitions of Poland in the late 18th century, and following the uprisings (like Kościuszko Uprising, November Uprising and January Uprising) against the partitioning powers (Russia, Prussia and Austria), many Poles have chosen – or been forced – to go into exile, forming large diasporas (known as Polonia), especially in France and the United States. The entire population of Crimean Tatars (numbering 200,000 in all) that remained in their homeland of Crimea was exiled on 18 May 1944 to Central Asia as a form of ethnic cleansing and collective punishment on false accusations.

Since the Cuban Revolution, over a million Cubans have left Cuba. Most of these self-identified as exiles as their motivation for leaving the island is political in nature. At the time of the Cuban Revolution, Cuba only had a population of 6.5 million, and was not a country that had a history of significant emigration, it being the sixth largest recipient of immigrants in the world as of 1958. Most of the exiles' children also consider themselves to be Cuban exiles. Under Cuban law, children of Cubans born abroad are considered Cuban citizens. An extension of colonial practices, Latin America saw widespread exile, of a political variety, during the 19th and 20th century. Exiled political groups often develop complex media strategies, including diaspora engagement and investigative reporting, to maintain visibility, mobilise support, and address challenges of operating outside their home country.

=== Government in exile ===
During a foreign occupation or after a coup d'état, a government in exile of a such afflicted country may be established abroad. One of the most well-known instances of this is the Polish government-in-exile, a government in exile that commanded Polish armed forces operating outside Poland, and the African-based Free French Forces government of Charles de Gaulle during the German Occupation of Poland and France in WWII. Other post-war examples include the client All Palestine Government established by the Egyptian Kingdom, and the Central Tibetan Administration, commonly known as the Tibetan government-in-exile, and headed by the 14th Dalai Lama.

=== For inanimate objects ===
Ivan the Terrible once exiled to Siberia an inanimate object: a bell. "When the inhabitants of the town of Uglich rang their bell to rally a demonstration against Ivan the Terrible, the cruel Czar executed two hundred (nobles), and exiled the Uglich bell to Siberia, where it remained for two hundred years."

== In popular culture ==
=== Drama ===
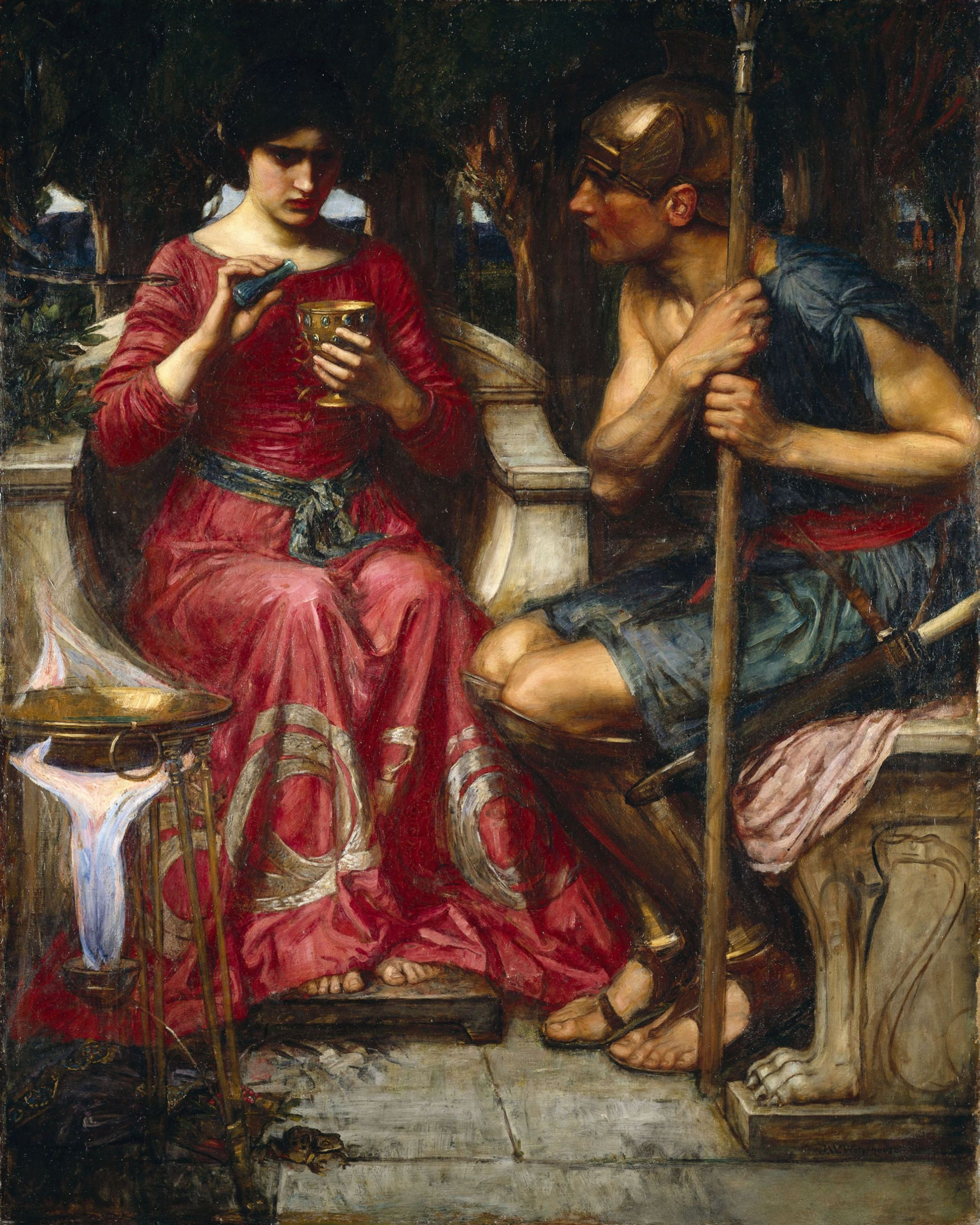
Jason and Medea, by John William Waterhouse, 1907

Exile is an early motif in ancient Greek tragedy. In the ancient Greek world, this was seen as a fate worse than death. The motif reaches its peak on the play Medea, written by Euripides in the fifth century BC, and rooted in the very old oral traditions of Greek mythology. Euripides' Medea has remained the most frequently performed Greek tragedy through the 20th century.

=== Art ===
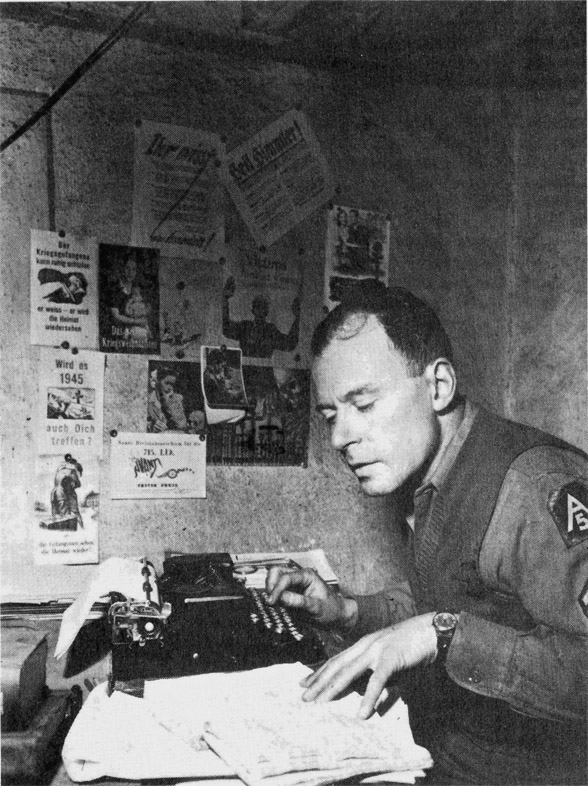
Exiled Klaus Mann as Staff Sergeant of the 5th US Army, Italy 1944

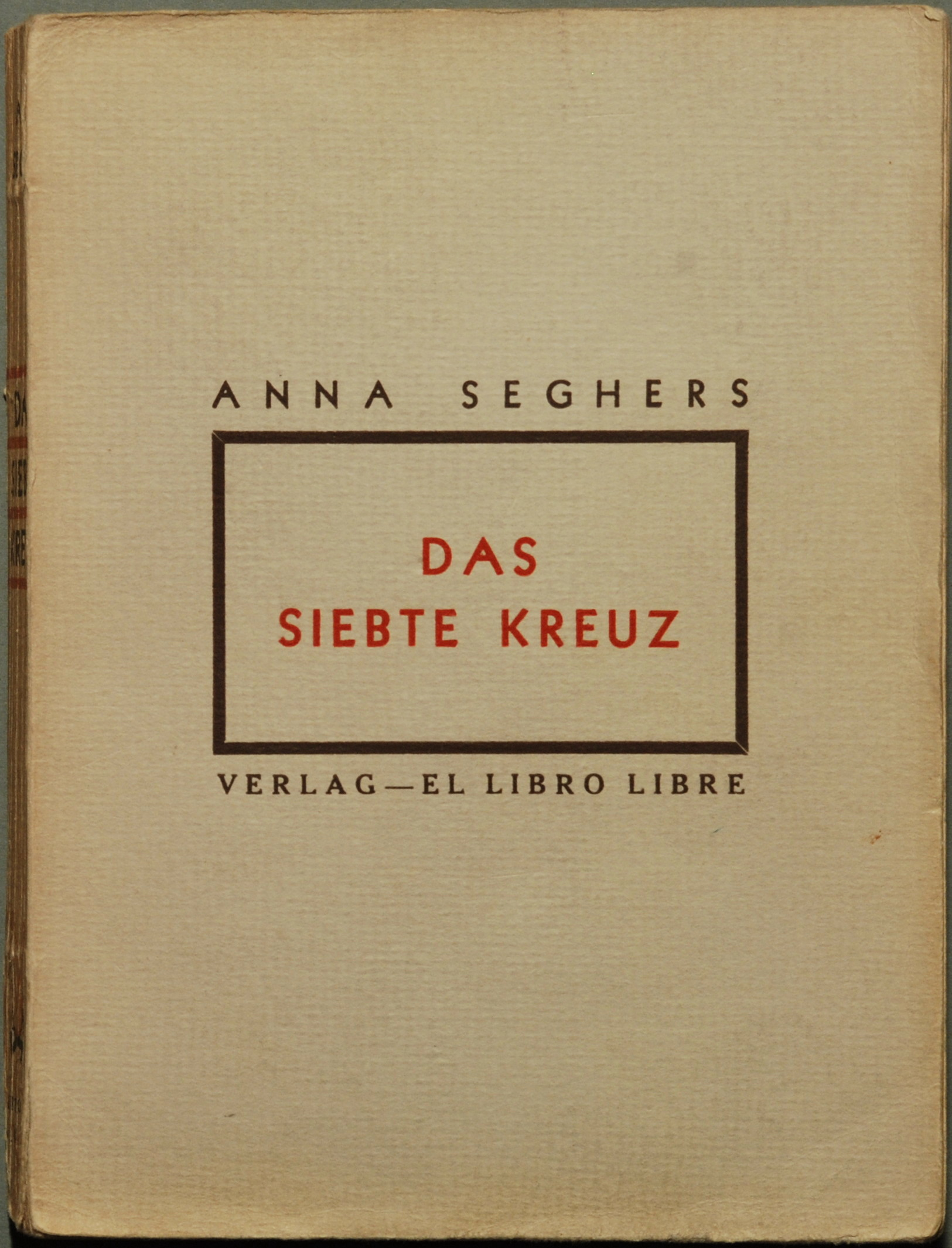
Cover of Anna Seghers' Das siebte Kreuz

After Medea was abandoned by Jason and had become a murderess out of revenge, she fled to Athens and married king Aigeus there, and became the stepmother of the hero Theseus. Due to a conflict with him, she must leave the Polis and go away into exile. John William Waterhouse (1849–1917), the English Pre-Raphaelite painter's famous picture Jason and Medea shows a key moment before, when Medea tries to poison Theseus.

=== Literature ===
In ancient Rome, the Roman Senate had the power to declare the exile to individuals, families or even entire regions. One of the Roman victims was the poet Ovid, who lived during the reign of Augustus. He was forced to leave Rome and move away to the city of Tomis on the Black Sea, now Constanța. There he wrote his famous work Tristia (Sorrows) about his bitter feelings in exile. Another, at least in a temporary exile, was Dante.

The German-language writer Franz Kafka described the exile of Karl Rossmann in the posthumously published novel Amerika.

During the period of National Socialism in the first few years after 1933, many Jews, as well as a significant number of German artists and intellectuals fled into exile; for instance, the authors Klaus Mann and Anna Seghers. So Germany's own exile literature emerged and received worldwide credit. Klaus Mann finished his novel Der Vulkan (The Volcano: A Novel Among Emigrants) in 1939 describing the German exile scene, "to bring the rich, scattered and murky experience of exile into epic form", as he wrote in his literary balance sheet. At the same place and in the same year, Anna Seghers published her famous novel Das siebte Kreuz (The Seventh Cross, published in the United States in 1942).

Important exile literature in recent years include that of the Caribbean, many of whose artists emigrated to Europe or the United States for political or economic reasons. These writers include Nobel Prize winners V. S. Naipaul and Derek Walcott as well as the novelists Edwidge Danticat and Sam Selvon.

== See also ==
- Banishment in the Torah
- Ban (law)
- Defection
- Echols County, Georgia, the U.S. state of Georgia has at times banished criminals from all of its counties except this one.
- Émigré
- Minus six – form of exile in the Soviet Union
- Outlawry
- Penal colony
- Petalism
- Porcian Laws, the Roman laws granting citizens the right to voluntary exile in place of capital punishment
- Refugee
- Right of asylum (political asylum)
- Shimanagashi
- Category:Exiles by nationality
- Category:Armies in exile
