= Astrateias graphe =

Ancient Greek law

Astrateias Graphe (Ancient Greek: ἀστρατείας γραφή) was a legal charge in Ancient Athens that could be brought against citizens who failed to appear for required military service. People accused of this offense were tried in courts consisting of fellow soldiers and presided over by strategoi.

== Definition ==
The offense of astrateia consisted at minimum of refusal to serve in the military when called upon. Scholars debate the precise relationship between astrateias and related offenses of cowardice (δειλίας), unauthorized retreat during battle (λιποταξίου) and desertion (λιποστρατίου), with some treating one of these terms as an umbrella term that includes the others.

== Legal process ==
An accusation of astrateia could be brought by a citizen. The accused would be tried in a court consisting of a general (Strategos) and soldiers who had served in the associated military campaign. For this reason cases could be tried after the conclusion of the campaign in which the accused failed to serve. If convicted, the defendant and his descendants would have their citizenship revoked (atimia).
