= Opsigamiou Graphe, Kakogamiou Graphe and Agamiou Graphe =

The Opsigamiou Graphe (Ancient Greek: ὀψιγαμίου γραφή), Kakogamiou Graphe (Ancient Greek: κακογαμίου γραφή) and Agamiou Graphe (Ancient Greek: ἀγαμίου γραφή), were legal procedures in ancient Sparta aimed at regulating marriage. It was used to bring proceedings against individuals who married too late (opsigamiou), married unsuitably (kakogamiou), or did not marry at all (agamiou). Those found guilty of these offenses were penalized with atimia (ἀτιμία).

== Legal Proceedings and Categories of Offenses ==
- Opsigamiou/Late Marriage (γραφὴ ὀψιγαμίου): Those who married later than the acceptable age faced legal action.
- Kakogamiou/Unsuitable Marriage (γραφὴ κακογαμίου): Individuals who entered into marriages deemed inappropriate by Spartan standards could be subject to prosecution.
- Agamiou/Celibacy (γραφὴ ἀγαμίου): Individuals who did not marry at all.

The penalty for being found guilty of any of these offenses was atimia, which stripped individuals of their civic rights and social standing.

Plutarch further details additional penalties for unmarried individuals, including exclusion from certain public activities, mockery in public rituals, and even physical punishment during certain festivals.

== In democratic Athens ==
The existence of a similar legal procedures in Athens during the democratic period is doubtful. Modern scholars have rejected the evidence presented in passages by ancient authors. Moreover, no mention of agamiou graphe appears in the works of Athenian orators, even in cases where proving someone's unmarried status.

Athenian society valued individual liberty highly, and this is likely why no such law was enacted in Athens. Despite the lack of a similar law, Athens did impose certain societal expectations regarding marriage, especially for those involved in public life. Individuals who aspired to positions such as orators or generals were required to have children, according to the laws.

== Plato ==
Plato, in his work Laws, also addressed the issue of marriage and celibacy. He proposed that all citizens should be compelled to marry before the age of 35. This would be enforced through fines and atimia, reflecting the importance he placed on marriage for the benefit of the state. Additionally, Plato argued that citizens should select spouses not based on personal pleasure but with the state's interests in mind, further emphasizing the communal nature of marriage in his ideal society.
