= Damon of Athens =

5th-century BC Greek musicologist

Damon (Ancient Greek: Δάμων, gen.: Δάμωνος), son of Damonides, was a Greek musicologist of the fifth century BC. He belonged to the Athenian deme of Oē (sometimes spelled "Oa"). He is credited as teacher and advisor of Pericles.

== Music ==
Damon's expertise was supposed to be musicology, though some believed this was a cover for a broader influence over Pericles' political policy. For instance, Damon is said to have been responsible for advising Pericles to institute the policy of paying jurors for their service; this policy was widely criticized, and Damon is said to have been ostracized for it (see the Aristotelian Athenaion Politeia), probably sometime in the last third of the 5th century BCE.

Plato invokes Damon many times in the Republic as the musical expert to be deferred to concerning the details of rhythmical education. In Plato's Laches, Damon is said to have been a student of Prodicus and of Agathocles. The former was an unabashed sophist, while the latter is said (in Plato's Protagoras) to have used musical expertise as a front for being a sophist.

== Damonides ==
The extant texts of the Aristotelian Constitution of the Athenians mention Damonides as an advisor to Pericles. The mention there of "Damonides" is now almost universally considered an editorial slip of pen, where the original text read "Damon, son of Damonides" instead. This seems to be confirmed by ostraka that have been recovered and that bear the name "Damon son of Damonides".

== See also ==
- List of speakers in Plato's dialogues
