= Graphe paranomon =

Form of legal action used in ancient Athens

The graphḗ paranómōn (Ancient Greek: γραφή παρανόμων), was a form of legal action believed to have been introduced at Athens under the democracy sometime around the year 415 BC; it has been seen as a replacement for ostracism, which fell into disuse around the same time, although this view is not held by David Whitehead, who points out that the graphe paranomon was a legal procedure with legal ramifications, including shame, and the convicted had officially committed a crime, whereas the ostrakismos was not shameful in the least.

The name means "suit against (bills) contrary to the laws." The suit could be brought against laws or decrees that had already been passed, or earlier when they were merely proposals. Once someone announced under oath that he intended to bring such a suit, the legislation or decree in question was suspended until the matter was resolved. The thinking was that, as there was no mechanism in Athens for unmaking a law, any new law should not be in contradiction with the already existing laws.

The suit served a double function. Firstly, it provided a means of reviewing and perhaps rescinding decrees and legislation passed by the assembly. In this it seems to resemble a court of review such as the modern U.S. Supreme Court. However, the judges (who in English are usually referred to as jurors) of the judicial formations of the Athenian court of Heliaia were, like those attending assembly, ordinary citizens and not legal experts, just as the court used was a general one and not a panel devoted to legislative matters. (Jurors, it is true, had a slightly higher status, as they had to be over thirty, not twenty as for the assembly, and they were under oath.) The mechanism can be compared to the upper houses found in many modern democracies. However, in Athens this review was not automatic, but had to be initiated by a citizen. Unlike both an upper house or a specially established court, the review was not framed as an impartial and objective re-examination, but was couched as a prosecution to be defended by a defendant who stood to suffer a penalty in the event of conviction.

In this lies its second function: it provided a weapon with which rival Athenian politicians could damage or eliminate each other, or from another perspective, a means by which the Athenian demos could favor or punish the leaders who served it. The suit was brought against the speaker who had proposed the motion in the assembly: he was regarded as having misled the people and corrupted the laws of the state, since the assembly itself was not accountable to anyone and by a kind of structural fiction (see legal fiction) could do no wrong. The liability of the proposer expired after one year; after that the law itself could still be attacked and rescinded, but the proposer would not suffer any penalty. After five years the law itself was no longer subject to a suit.

The penalty for conviction was usually a fine, sometimes small but sometimes so large it could not be paid. In this case disenfranchisement (atimia) would result, effectively ending a political career. Because of this, active politicians began recruiting surrogates to propose bills that they themselves had authored. Penalties would then fall on the surrogate rather than on the politician himself.

Very many of the known prosecutions concern not substantive legislation but honorary decrees, seemingly of little importance from a modern viewpoint. These did however allow discussion of a wide range of questions and issues. A signal example is the pair of speeches surviving from a graphē paranómōn from 333 BC, Demosthenes' On the Crown in response to Aeschines' Against Ctesiphon.

== See also ==
- Judicial review
