= Petalism =

Penalty of exile in Greek Syracuse

Petalism (Ancient Greek: πεταλισμός, petalismos), was an ancient Syracusan variant of ancient Athens's ostracism, wherein a citizen was temporarily removed from the city and public life. It was first and exclusively recorded in Diodorus Siculus's Bibliotheca historica.

== Institution ==
Following a failed coup by Tyndarides in 454 BCE, the Syracusan assembly sought to check the power of potential tyrants and prevent future political uprisings. Consequently, the assembly turned to Athens's institution of ostracism as an example, adopting and adapting the system for their own use. Thus, the assembly established their own system known as petalism.

== Execution and differences from ostracism ==
Based upon the Athenian practice of ostracism, Syracusan citizens would vote on an influential individual to be cast out from the city, with their votes being recorded and submitted on olive leaves, rather than the traditional piece of pottery (ὄστρακον, ostrakon) used in ostracism. Additionally, the individual to be ostracized was determined by whoever received the greatest number of votes, with no set threshold number of votes required. As a result, one citizen was guaranteed to be sentenced after a vote, with the individual then being "exiled" for a period of five years, compared to the sentence of ten years given to Athens's ostracized.

== Effects and discontinuation ==
Following the employment of the practice, rich and respectable citizens began to fear exile, so they withdrew from public affairs. During their seclusion, the affluent members of Syracusan society attended to personal business while living in luxury, resulting in a growing wealth divide. Consequently, with the most prominent citizens avoiding public affairs, leadership was left to less capable individuals, leading to increasing factional and revolutionary conflicts. By 450 BCE, the practice had largely been abandoned by the Syracusan assembly before eventually being abolished altogether.
