= Greek democracy =

Form of governance in ancient Greek city-states

During the Classical era and Hellenistic era of Classical Antiquity, many Hellenic city-states had adopted democratic forms of government, in which free (non-slave), native (non-foreigner) adult male citizens of the city took a major and direct part in the management of the affairs of state, such as declaring war, voting supplies, dispatching diplomatic missions and ratifying treaties. These activities were often handled by a form of direct democracy, based on a popular assembly. Others, of judicial and official nature, were often handled by large juries, drawn from the citizen body in a process known as sortition.

== Democracy in Greek city-states ==
By far the most well-documented and studied example is the Athenian democracy in Athens. Although Athens is the most familiar of the democratic city-states in ancient Greece, it was not the only one, nor was it the first; multiple other city-states adopted similar democratic constitutions before Athens. By the late 4th century BC, as many as half of the over one thousand existing Greek cities might have been democracies.

There are documented examples of at least fifty-two Greek city-states including Corinth, Thebes, Megara, Syracuse and Tarentum that also had democratic regimes during part of their history.

According to Ober (2015), the proportion of Greek city-states with democratic regimes gradually increased from the mid 6th century BC to the end of the 4th century BC, when perhaps half of the one-thousand Greek city-states in existence at the time had democratic regimes.

== Federal Leagues ==
During the period from the 4th to the early 2nd centuries BC, the political center of gravity in Greece shifted from individual city-states to federal leagues, such as the Boeotian League, Aetolian League, Achaean League, Epirote League, League of the Macedonians, Acarnanian League. These were confederations that jointly handled the foreign and military affairs for the member cities. Their internal structure was democratic with respect to the member cities, that is, each city within the league had a weight roughly proportional to its size and power. On the other hand, the cities themselves were largely represented in the leagues by their wealthy elites if they had an oligarchic form of government (another common form of government during the late Classical and Hellenistic periods) or by their Tyrant if they had a tyrannical form of government.

These federal leagues differed from earlier groupings of Greek city-states, like the Peloponnesian League, the Delian League and the Hellenic League in that they were not dominated by a single state as the earlier leagues used to be dominated by Sparta, Athens, and Macedon respectively.

== See also ==
- Athenian democracy
- Ionian League
- Amphictionic League
- List of ancient Greek alliances
- Roman Republic
