= Relegatio =

Form of exile in Roman law

Relegatio (or relegatio in insulam) under Roman law was the mildest form of exile, involving banishment from Rome, but not loss of citizenship, or confiscation of property. It was a sentence used for adulterers, those that committed sexual violence or manslaughter, and procurers.

A notable victim of relegatio was Ovid.

== Origins ==
Under the early Republic, citizens could be cut off from the community – fire and water – by the interdictio aquae et ignis. To forestall this, they sometimes went into voluntary exile (exilium), where citizenship might be maintained or lost but property would normally be retained. By contrast, relegatio was mainly employed to expel foreigners from Rome: only under the late Republic did it begin to be applied to political figures within Rome.

== Under the Empire ==
The emperors made relegatio one of their main weapons of banishment, alongside deportatio. Relegatio might be for a specific period or for life; it might be to a fixed spot, or simply outside Rome or Italy. The exile could take place in any isolated place, not necessarily an island. Tacitus describes how one senator "chose the famous and agreeable island of Lesbos for his exile". In any case, it remained a softer penalty than the alternative of deportatio, which generally entailed loss of citizenship and property as well as banishment to a specific spot. A relegatio sentence was often only temporary and once the sentenced was pardoned, they could return to Rome.

The poet Ovid was exiled under relegatio to Tomis, in what is modern-day Romania. In his writing, he never clearly stated what caused this exile. Ovid in his exile made play of the fact that he remained a citizen in charge of his property in Rome, though he was unable either to have his relegatio rescinded or his exile switched to a more pleasant spot. By contrast, Juvenal (at least in Gilbert Highet’s reconstruction) was subjected to deportatio; and though his sentence was eventually repealed he returned to Rome a ruined man.

Under the later Empire, jurists set up a hierarchy of banishments: temporary relegatio, then permanent relegatio, relegatio to an island or fixed spot, and finally deportation.

== Cultural echoes ==
Epictetus praised a stoic senator who heard he had been condemned in his absence: "'To exile', says he, 'or to death?' – 'To exile' – 'What about my property?' – 'It has not been confiscated' – 'Well then, let us go to Arica [first stop outside Rome] and take our lunch there'".

== See also ==
- Damnatio memoriae
