= Atimia =

Form of disenfranchisement

Atimia (Ancient Greek: Ατιμία) was a form of disenfranchisement used in ancient Greek cities.

Under democracy in ancient Greece, only free adult Greek males were enfranchised as full citizens. Women, foreigners, children and slaves were not full citizens; they could not vote or hold public office, and they had to have adult male citizens act as guardians of their property and other interests. A man who was made atimos, literally meaning without honour or value, was likewise disenfranchised and disempowered, making him unable to carry out the political functions of a citizen. He could not attend assembly meetings, serve as a juror in Heliaia or bring actions before the courts.

Being barred from assembly would effectively end a citizen's political ambition. Not being able to use the courts to defend oneself against enemies could be socially crippling. It also meant the loss of the small income that jury service and attendance at the assembly provided, which could be significant for poor people unable to work.

Atimia could be inflicted as a penalty by the courts for crimes such as bribery, embezzlement, false witness, and breach of duty as a public officer. A temporary form of atimia was automatically imposed if a debt to the state was unpaid after a certain time, for instance if someone was unable to pay a fine. There was no upper limit on the fines courts could impose and they could well be larger than a person's entire estate. Just as this debt was inheritable, so was the status.

Failure to abide by atimia was seen as an attack on the power of the people, represented by the courts that had imposed it. Failing to comply with atimia could lead to the death penalty.

== See also ==
- Infamia
- Outlawry
