= Aristoi =

Label given to noblemen in ancient Greek society

The Aristoi (Greek: ἄριστοι) was the label given to the noblemen in ancient Greek society, and in particular ancient Athens. The term literally means "best", with the denotation of best in terms of birth, rank, and nobility, but also usually possessing the connotation of also being the morally best. Goldman emphasizes that the notion of 'good work' has been a persistent theme in defining the ideals of excellence, suggesting that Aristoi were not only leaders but also exemplars of ethical conduct and civic responsibility. The term in fact derives similarly with arete: "The root of the word is the same as aristos, the word which shows superlative ability and superiority, and "aristos" was constantly used in the plural to denote the nobility."

== History ==
Originally, the Aristoi were tightly knit families who had noble lineage, such as the Bacchiadae in ancient Corinth.

In the early 6th century BC, Solon promulgated constitutional reforms in Athens. Among the changes, the status and power of the old aristocracy was altered by making wealth rather than birth a criterion for holding political position. This system was called a Timocracy (Greek: τιμοκρατία).

This division called for a new division. Thus, citizens were organized based on their land production:

1. Pentacosiomedimni (or Pentakosiomedimnoi), who had at least 500 medimnoi of wet or dry goods (or their equivalent) as yearly income
2. Hippeis, who had at least 300 medimnoi (or their equivalent) as yearly income
3. Zeugitae, who were possessors of a yoke of oxen, with at least 150 medimnoi (or their equivalent) as yearly income
4. Thetes, who were workers for wages, or had less than 150 medimnoi (or their equivalent) as yearly income

This new system established the pentakosiomedimnoi as the aristoi. As such, they were often split into powerful family factions or clans, who controlled all of the important political positions in the polis. Their wealth usually came from both having property the most fertile or protected lands. However, as the status was predicated on his wealth, and losing it would cause the loss of nobility, the advent of sea trade routes placed the aristoi at risk of losing everything through failed overseas investments.

Pittacus of Mytilene instituted a law stating that crimes committed in drunkenness should be punished twofold; this law was directed predominantly against the aristocrats, as they were more often guilty of drunk and violent behaviour. As such, it was greatly appreciated by the common people.

=== Customs ===
In Classical Athens, Thucydides testifies concerning the customs of both citizens and of the rich. He writes that no one bears weapons within the polis, as it permits "an easier and more luxurious mode of life". Where the archaic aristocracy used to carry weapons on their person in the city, the practice was completely abandoned due to cultural shifts. Among the causes were legal changes; an example was the forbidding of people to bear arms in the agora under the penalty of death. The iconography of vases bear witness to this change depicting the transition from men carrying swords, then spears, then staffs, then – for a brief period of time – parasols, to eventually nothing. They even considered various reasons behind this transformation. Among the causes were legal reforms, such as banning weapons in the agora under threat of death.

Thucydides also speaks of how the Aristoi took cultural cues from the orient, such as "the luxury of wearing undergarments of linen, and fastening a knot of their hair with a tie of golden grasshoppers." This went out of fashion after the Athenian elite began to mimic the Lacedaemonians, wearing more modest garments in order "to assimilate their way of life to that of the common people".

The information in Athens, where elites began adopting more modest behaviors and styles was influence by broader civilizing trends. For example, the aristocratic adoption of Spartan simplicity reflects a deliberate effort that will align with the democratic values. This shift wasn't just about aesthetics but also signified a moral and political commitment to a shared civic identity.

== Influences ==
The Aristoi Classical Academy, formerly West Houston Charter School, takes its name from the concept.

== See also ==
- History of Athens
