= Solonian constitution =

Constitution of ancient Athens, 6th century BC

The Solonian constitution was created by Solon in the early 6th century BC. At the time of Solon, the Athenian State was almost falling to pieces in consequence of dissensions between the parties into which the population was divided. Solon wanted to revise or abolish the older laws of Draco. He promulgated a code of laws embracing the whole of public and private life, the salutary effects (Note: Effecting or designed to effect an improvement) of which lasted long after the end of his constitution.

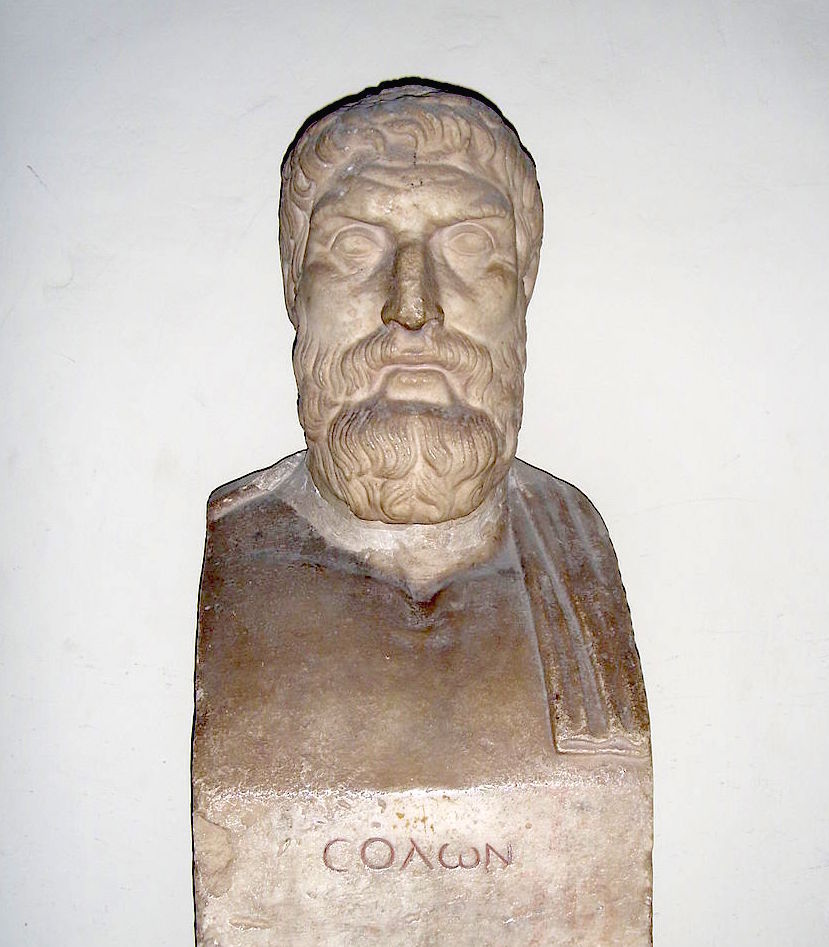
Bust of Solon in Vatican Museums

Under Solon's reforms, all debts were abolished and all debt-slaves were freed. The status of the hectemoroi (the "one-sixth workers"), who farmed in an early form of serfdom, was also abolished. These reforms were known as the Seisachtheia. (Note: the "shaking-off of burdens".) Solon's constitution reduced the power of the old aristocracy by making wealth rather than birth a criterion for holding political positions, a system called timokratia (timocracy). Citizens were also divided based on their land production: pentacosiomedimnoi, hippeis, zeugitae, and thetes. The lower assembly was given the right to hear appeals, and Solon also created the higher assembly. Both of these were meant to decrease the power of the Areopagus, the aristocratic council. Despite the division between classes and citizens, Solon felt these classes were connected as one. Solon felt that a disservice against even just one member of the society would indirectly be a disservice against every member of the society. The only parts of Draconian constitution that Solon kept were the laws regarding homicide. The constitution was written as poetry, and as soon as it was introduced, Solon went into self-imposed exile for ten years so he would not be tempted to take power as a tyrant.

Religion

There was also a religious impact that played a role in the archaic city. Within the clans there was never a recovery of military impact, but religion had always influenced political potential. Generations beyond the years had gone on and religion was not forgotten as the advancement of the political system did.

== Classes ==
=== Pentacosiomedimnoi ===
The pentacosiomedimni or pentakosiomedimnoi (Ancient Greek: πεντακοσιομέδιμνοι) were the top class of citizens: those whose property or estate could produce at least 500 medimnoi of wet or dry goods (or their equivalent), per year. They were eligible for all top positions of government in Athens. These were:

- Nine archons and treasurers
- Council of Areopagus (as ex-archons)
- Council of 500
- Ecclesia

The pentacosiomedimnoi could also serve as generals (strategoi) in the Athenian army.

=== Hippeis ===
Prior to the rule of Solon, the term hippeus came from the word "horse"; as those who were rich enough to buy a horse would flaunt their superiority by selecting names that began or ended with the word "hippos". However, Solon later changed the meaning of the hippeus, as it became the second highest of the four social classes. It was composed of men who had at least 300 medimnoi or their equivalent as yearly income. The Hippeus were also called the Knights in Aristotle's Athenian Constitution (circa 350 BC). Aristotle gave an alternate characterization for the class of Hippeus as 'those who were able to maintain a horse'. This assumption appears to be on the basis of the inscription of the statute of Diphilus.

=== Zeugitae ===
The zeugitae (Ancient Greek: ζευγῖται, romanized: zeugitai) were those whose property or estate could produce at least 200 medimnoi of wet or dry goods (or their equivalent), per year. The term appears to have come from the Greek word for "yoke", which has led modern scholars to conclude that zeugitae were either men who could afford a yoked pair of oxen or men who were "yoked together" in the phalanx—that is, men who could afford their own hoplite armor.

The zeugitae could serve as hoplites in the Athenian army. The idea was that one could serve as a hoplite if he had enough money to equip himself in that manner, i.e. he could produce 200 medimnoi or more per year.

At the time of Solon's reforms, zeugitae were granted the right to hold certain minor political offices. Their status rose through the years; in 457/6 BC, they were granted the right to hold the archonship, and in the late 5th century moderate oligarchs advocated for the creation of an oligarchy in which all men of hoplite status or higher would be enfranchised, and such a regime was indeed established for a time during the Athenian coup of 411 BC.

They were eligible for a few positions of government in Athens such as:

- Council of 400
- Lower offices of state
- Ecclesia
- In 457−456 BC, the archonship was opened to zeugitae

=== Thetes ===
The thetes (Ancient Greek: θῆτες, romanized: thêtes, sing. Ancient Greek: θής, romanized: thēs, 'serf') were the lowest social class of citizens. The thetes were those who were workers for wages, or had less than 200 medimnoi (or their equivalent) as yearly income. (Thus, the wage ratio of pentacosiomedimni to thetes could be as little as 2.5). This distinction spanned from some time earlier than 594−593 BC until 322 BC. The thetes were defined as citizens who did not qualify as zeugitae, although the thetes may have predated the Solonian reforms. They could participate in the Ecclesia (the Athenian assembly), and could be jurors serving in the law court of the Heliaia, but were not allowed to serve in the Boule or serve as magistrates.

In the reforms of Ephialtes and Pericles around 460–450 BC, the thetes were empowered to hold public office.

Twelve thousand thetes were disenfranchised and expelled from the city after the Athenian defeat in the Lamian War. There is debate among scholars whether this represented the entire number of thetes, or simply those who left Athens, the remainder staying behind.

Unlike the popular concept of galley slaves, ancient navies generally preferred to rely on free men to row their galleys. In the 4th and 5th century, Athens generally followed a naval policy of enrolling citizens from the lower classes (the thetes), metics and hired foreigners. However, under some conditions, for example during the Mytilenean revolt, higher classes were enrolled as rowers also. This made them crucial in the Athenian Navy and therefore gave them a role in Athens' affairs.

== Details ==
Of the population dissatisfied, the inhabitants of the northern mountainous region of Attica, and the poorest and most oppressed section of the population, the diacrii, demanded that the privileges of the nobility, which had till then been obtained, should be utterly set aside. Another party, prepared to be contented by moderate concessions, was composed of the parali, the inhabitants of the "Paralia", the coast. The third was formed by the nobles, called pedici or pediaci, (Note: The city of Athens was anciently divided into three districts, one sunny slope of a hill, one other on the beach of the sea, and the third in the middle of the plain between the hill and the sea. The inhabitants of the intermediate district were called pediani, pediaci or pedici, those of the hill were referred to as the diacrii, and those of the shore as the paralii. These three classes of inhabitants formed many factions. Pisistratus availed of pediani against diacrii. In the time of Solon, when he had choose a form of government, the democratic diacrii they wanted, the pediani asked the aristocracy, and the paralii a mixed government.) because their property lay for the most part in the pedion, (Note: The Greek word, pedion (πεδίον) means 'plain', 'flat', 'field'.) the level and most fruitful part of the country. Solon, who enjoyed the confidence of all parties on account of his tried insight and sound judgment, was chosen archon by a compromise, with full power to put an end to the difficulties, and to restore peace by means of legislation. One of the primary measures of Solon was the Seisachtheia ("dis-burdening ordinance"). This gave an immediate relief by cancelling all debts, public and private. At the same time, he made it illegal for the future to secure debts upon the person of the debtor. (Note: In ancient Greece, the power of creditors over the persons of their debtors was absolute; and, as in all cases where despotic control is tolerated, their rapacity was boundless. They compelled the insolvent debtors to cultivate their lands like entile, to perform the service of beasts of burthen, and to transfer to them their sons and daughters, whom they exported as slaves to foreign countries.: For more, see 1832 Select Committee report: "Imprisonment for Debt" in Reports of Committees of The House of Representatives.) Solon also altered the standard of coinage [and of weights and measures], by introducing the Euboic standard (Note: Used around the Euboea) in place of the Pheidonian (Note: Used by Pheidon, king of Argos) or Aeginetan standard. (Note: Used around the Aegina) 100 new drachmae were thus made to contain the same amount of silver as 73 old drachmae.

=== Timocracy ===
By this measure he pleased neither party, but the rich were dissatisfied at the loss of their securities, and the poor were still more so because the land was not divided afresh, as they hoped it would be, and because he had not, like Lykurgus, established absolute equality.

— Plutarch, Life of Solon 16:1
Translation:

... [Solon], wishing to leave all magistracies as he found them, in the hands of the wealthy classes, but to give the people a share in the rest of the constitution, from which they were then excluded, took a census of the wealth of the citizens, and made a first class of those who had an annual income of not less than five hundred medimni of dry or liquid produce; these he called pentakosiomedimni. The next class were the Hippeis, or knights, consisting of those who were able to keep a horse, or who had an income of three hundred medimni. The third class were the Zeugitae, whose property qualification was two hundred medimni of dry or liquid produce; and the last class were the Thetes, whom Solon did not permit to be magistrates, but whose only political privilege was the right of attending the public assemblies and sitting as jurymen in the law courts. This privilege was at first insignificant, but afterwards became of infinite importance, because most disputes were settled before a jury. Even in those cases which he allowed the magistrates to settle, he provided a final appeal to the people.

— Plutarch, Life of Solon 18:1

Solon further instituted a timocracy, (τιμοκρατία) and those who did not belong to the nobility received a share in the rights of citizens, (Note: by which the exclusive rights which the nobles had till then possessed were set aside) according to a scale determined by their property and their corresponding services to the Athenian State. For this purpose, he divided the population into four classes, (Note: Not unlike the four occupations of Ancient China.) founded on the possession of land:

1. pentacosiomedimni (or pentacosiomedimnoi) – who had at least 500 medimni of produce as yearly income
2. hippeis – knights, with at least 300 medimni
3. zeugitae – possessors of a yoke of oxen, with at least 200 medimni
4. thetes – workers for wages, with less than 200 medimni of yearly income

Solon's legislation only granted to the first three of these four classes a vote in the election of responsible officers, and only to the first class the power of election to the highest offices; as, for instance, that of archon. The first three classes were bound to serve as hoplites; the cavalry was raised out of the first two, while the fourth class was only employed as light-armed troops or on the fleet, and apparently for pay. The others served without pay. The holders of office in the State were also unpaid.

Each division had different rights; for example, the pentacosiomedimnoi could be archons, while thetes could only attend the Athenian assembly. The fourth class was excluded from all official positions, but possessed the right of voting in the general public assemblies (the Heliaia) which chose officials and passed laws. They had also the right of taking part in the trials by jury which Solon had instituted.

=== Council of the Four Hundred ===
Solon established a constitutional order with a single chief consultative body, and a single administrative body. Solon established as the chief consultative body the Council of the Four Hundred, (Note: According to Aristotle's Constitution of Athens, 4, a Council of 401 members was part of Dracon's constitution (about 621 B.C.). The members were selected by lot from the whole body of citizens. Solon (who was archon in 594) reduced the Council to 400, one hundred from each of the four tribes; and extended in some particulars the powers already possessed by the Areopagus (ib. 8). See Boule) in which only the first three classes took part, and as chief administrative body the Areopagus, which was to be filled up by those who had been archons.

== See also ==
- History of democracy
- Reforms of Cleisthenes
- The Other Greeks

== References and citations ==
=== Sources ===
- Fine, John V. A. (1983). The Ancient Greeks: A critical history. Cambridge, Massachusetts (US): Belknap Press of Harvard University Press. ISBN 0-674-03314-0.
- Kagan, Donald (2003). The Peloponnesian War. New York: Viking. ISBN 0-670-03211-5.
- Renshaw, James (2008). In search of the Greeks. London, England: Bristol Classical Press; A & C Black. ISBN 978-1-85399-699-3.
- Ruschenbusch, Eberhard (1979). "Zur Besatzung athenischer Trieren". Historia. 28 (1): 106–110. ISSN 0018-2311. JSTOR 4435656.
- Whitehead, David (December 1981). "The Archaic Athenian ΖΕΥΓΙΤΑΙ". The Classical Quarterly. 31 (2): 282–286. doi:10.1017/S0009838800009599. ISSN 1471-6844. S2CID 197903099.
- James H. Oliver. (2003). The Solonian Constitution and a Consul of A.D. 149. Greek, Roman and Byzantine Studies, 13(1), 99–107. https://grbs.library.duke.edu/index.php/grbs/article/view/9671/4505

==== Primary ====
- Aristotle (1952). Constitution of the Athenians. Translated by Horace Rackham. Cambridge, Massachusetts; London, England: Harvard University Press; William Heinemann Limited – via Perseus Digital Library.
  - Aristotle's Athenian Constitution, Chapter 4
  - Aristotle's Athenian Constitution, Chapter 10
- Plutarch's Lives: Solon. (1914 edition, with English translation by Bernadotte Perrin). London, England: William Heinemann Ltd. – digitised and published online by Perseus Digital Library, Cambridge, Massachusetts. Harvard University Press.
  - "18: section 1". Plutarch's Lives: Solon. Translated by Bernadotte Perrin. London, England: William Heinemann Limited. 1914 – via Perseus Digital Library, Cambridge, Massachusetts. Harvard University Press.
  - "16: section 1". Plutarch's Lives: Solon. Translated by Bernadotte Perrin. London, England: William Heinemann Limited. 1914a – via Perseus Digital Library, Cambridge, Massachusetts. Harvard University Press.
