= Pebam Chittaranjan Mangang =

Indian civil right activist

Pebam Chittranjan Mangang was an Indian civil right activist from Manipur. He self-immolated on 58th Independence Day (15 August 2004) in protest against imposition of AFSPA in the state at Bishnupur Bazaar. His demands were to repeal AFSPA from the Northeast and to stop the violence carried out to the common people under this draconian law. He died on the following day. Every year many civil society organisations and student unions observed his death anniversary across the state.
