= Solon =

Athenian statesman (c. 639 – c. 559 BC)

- Σόλων
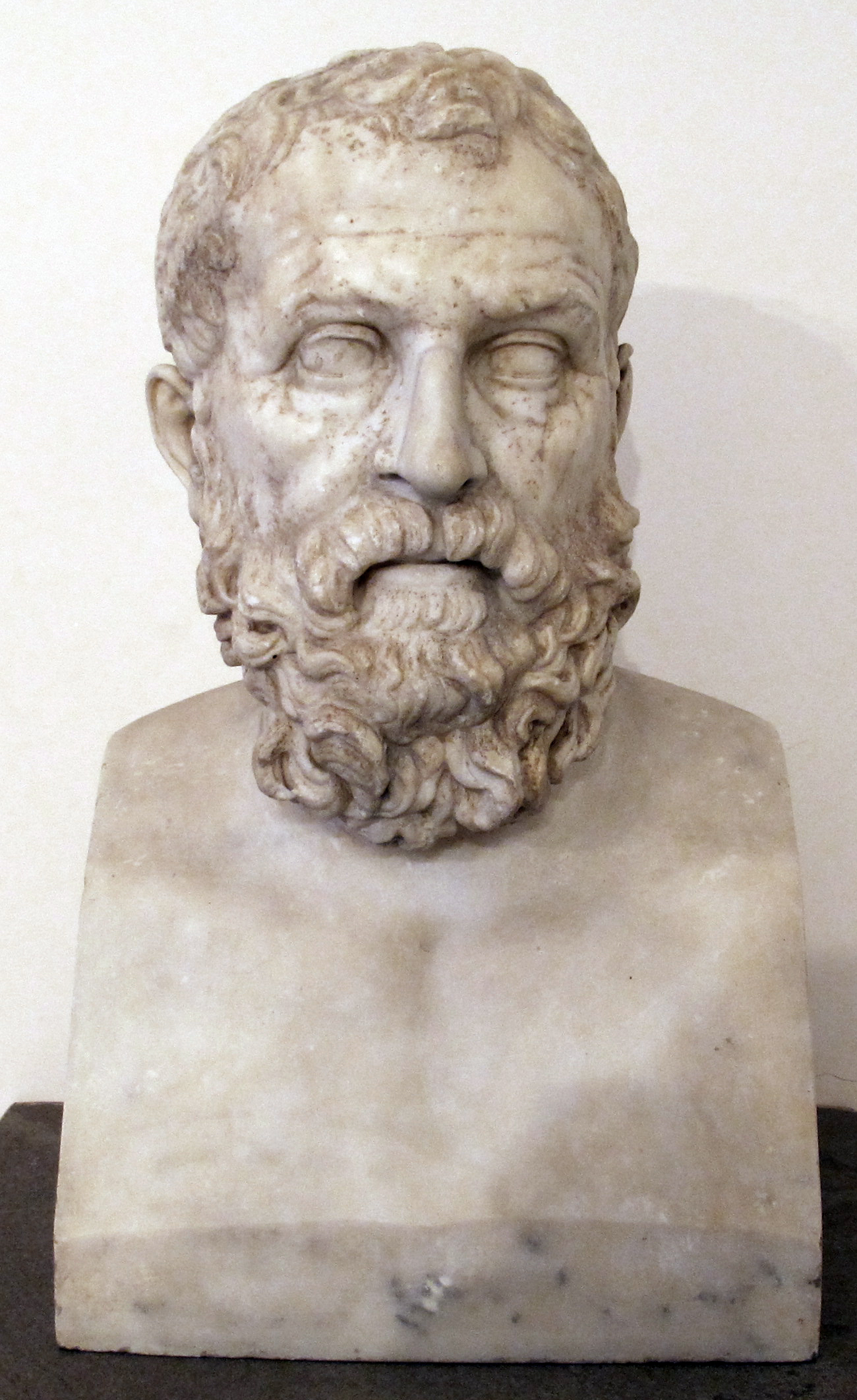
- Bust of Solon, copy from a Greek original (c. 110 BC) from the Farnese Collection, now at the National Archaeological Museum, Naples
- Born: c. 639 BC; Athens
- Died: c. 559 BC (aged 80) (Note: Solon died at 80 (Diogenes), and according to Phanias, he died within 2 years of Peisistratus' tyranny in Athens 561/560 BC, putting his death at about 559 BC or 558 BC, aged 80, and his birth at 639 BC or 638 BC.); Cyprus
- Occupations: Statesman, lawmaker, poet

Solon (/ˈsoʊlən/; Ancient Greek: Σόλων; c. 639 – c. 559 BC) was an archaic Athenian statesman, lawmaker, political philosopher (philosopher in an etymological sense), and poet. He was one of the Seven Sages of Greece and is credited with laying the foundations for Athenian democracy. Solon's efforts to legislate against political, economic and moral decline resulted in his constitutional reform reforming most of Draco's laws.

Solon's reforms included debt relief later known and celebrated among Athenians as the seisachtheia (shaking off of burdens). He is described by Aristotle in the Athenian Constitution as "the first people's champion". Demosthenes credited Solon's reforms with starting a golden age.

Modern knowledge of Solon is limited by the fact that his works only survive in fragments and appear to feature interpolations by later authors. It is further limited by the general scarcity of documentary and archaeological evidence covering Athens in the early 6th century BC.

Ancient authors such as Philo of Alexandria, Herodotus, and Plutarch are the main sources, but wrote about Solon long after his death. Fourth-century BC orators, such as Aeschines, tended to attribute to Solon all the laws of their own, much later times.

== Biography ==
=== Early life and ancestry ===
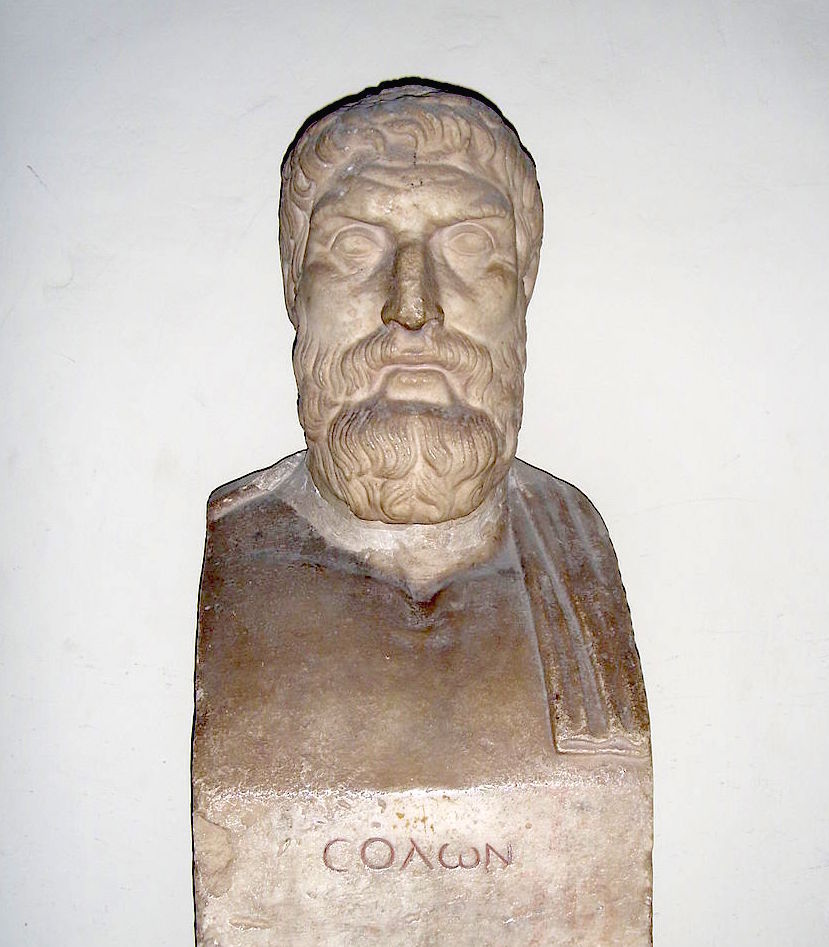
Bust of Solon in Vatican Museums

Solon was born in Athens around 630 BC. His family was distinguished in Attica because they belonged to a noble or Eupatrid clan. Solon's father was probably Execestides. If so, his lineage could be traced back to Codrus, the last King of Athens. According to Diogenes Laërtius, he had a brother named Dropides, who was an ancestor (six generations removed) of Plato. According to Plutarch, Solon was related to the tyrant Pisistratus, for their mothers were cousins. Solon is said to have done business in maritime trade which later authors in antiquity judged unaristocratic.

=== Defeat of Megara ===
When Athens and its neighbor and rival in the Saronic Gulf, Megara, were contesting the possession of Salamis, Solon was made leader of the Athenian forces. After repeated disasters, Solon was able to improve the morale of his troops through a nationalist poem he wrote about the island. Supported by Pisistratus, he defeated the Megarians either by means of a cunning trick or more directly through heroic battle around 595 BC. The Megarians, however, refused to give up their claim. The dispute was referred to the Spartans, who eventually awarded possession of the island to Athens on the strength of the case that Solon put to them. Plutarch professes admiration of Solon's elegy. The same poem was said by Diogenes Laërtius to have stirred Athenians more than any other verses that Solon wrote:

Let us go to Salamis to fight for the island
We desire, and drive away from our bitter shame!

One fragment describes assorted breads and cakes:

They drink and some nibble honey and sesame cakes (itria), others their bread, other gouroi mixed with lentils. In that place, not one cake was unavailable of all those that the black earth bears for human beings, and all were present unstintingly. (Note: The place of abundance described in Solon's fragment about cakes is unknown. Some authors speculate that it may have been Persia based on comments from Herodotus that cake was the most significant part of a meal, one of the Greek city-states, or even a literary allusion to 'paradise'. Though Athenaeus is not able to identify the hours cake from Solon's poem, he describes it as a plakous indicating it was a type of 'flat cake'. Similar cakes are described by Philoxenus of Cythera.)

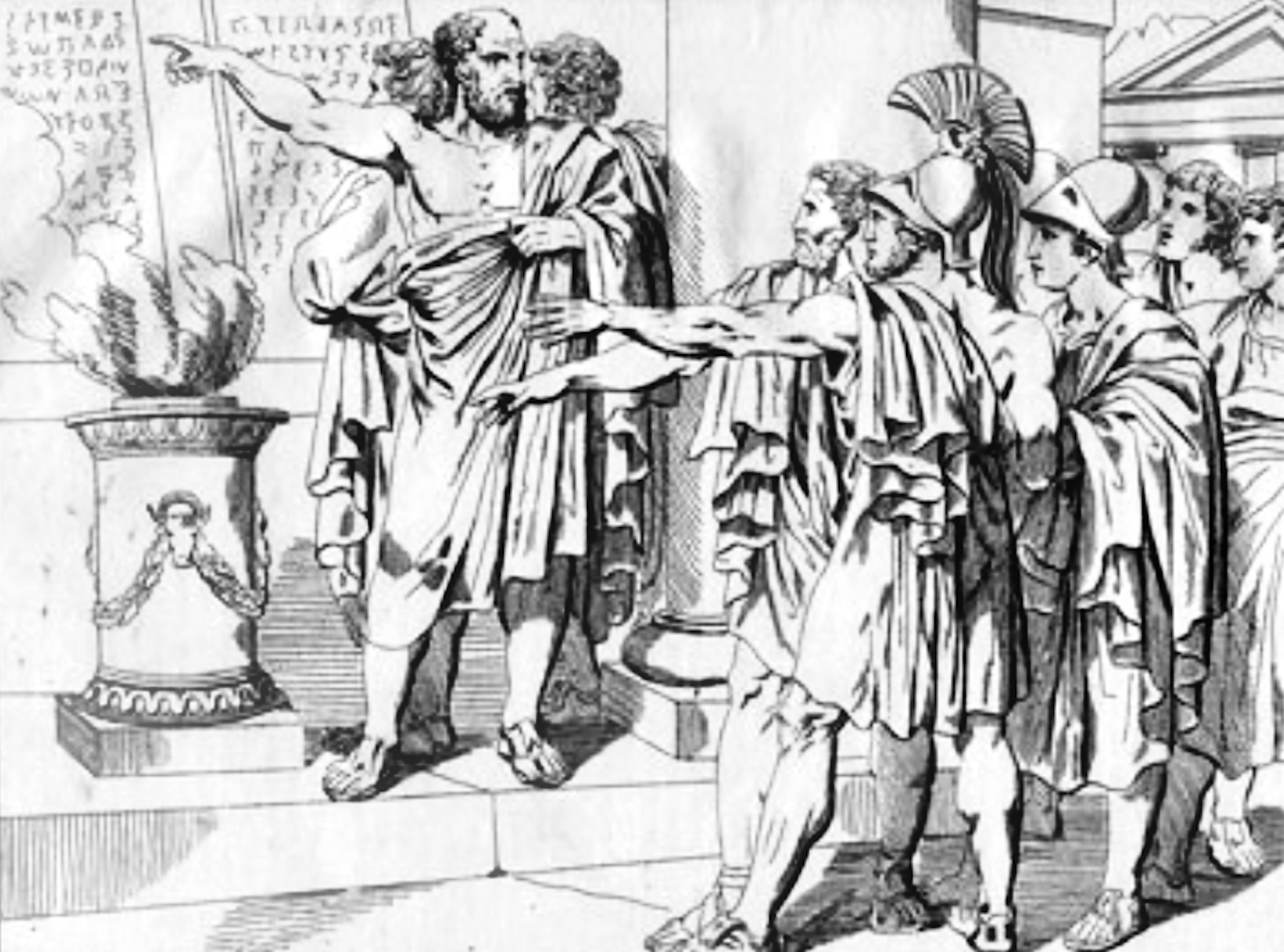
"Solon demands to pledge respect for his laws", book illustration (Augsburg 1832)

=== Archonship ===
According to Diogenes Laertius, in 594 BC, Solon was chosen archon, or chief magistrate. Solon repealed all of Draco's laws except those relating to homicide.

During Solon's time, many Greek city-states had seen the emergence of tyrants, opportunistic noblemen who had taken power on behalf of sectional interests. (Note: In Sicyon, Cleisthenes had usurped power on behalf of an Ionian minority. In Megara, Theagenes had come to power as an enemy of the local oligarchs. The son-in-law of Theagenes, an Athenian nobleman named Cylon, made an unsuccessful attempt to seize power in Athens in 632 BC.) Solon was described by Plutarch as having been temporarily awarded autocratic powers by Athenian citizens on the grounds that he had the wisdom to sort out their differences for them in a peaceful and equitable manner. Some modern scholars believe these powers were in fact granted some years after Solon had been archon, when he would have been a member of the Areopagus and probably a more respected statesman by his peers.

As archon, Solon discussed his intended reforms with some friends. Knowing that he was about to cancel all debts, these friends took out loans and promptly bought some land. Suspected of complicity, Solon complied with his own law and released his own debtors, amounting to five talents (or 15 according to some sources). His friends never repaid their debts.

=== Travels ===
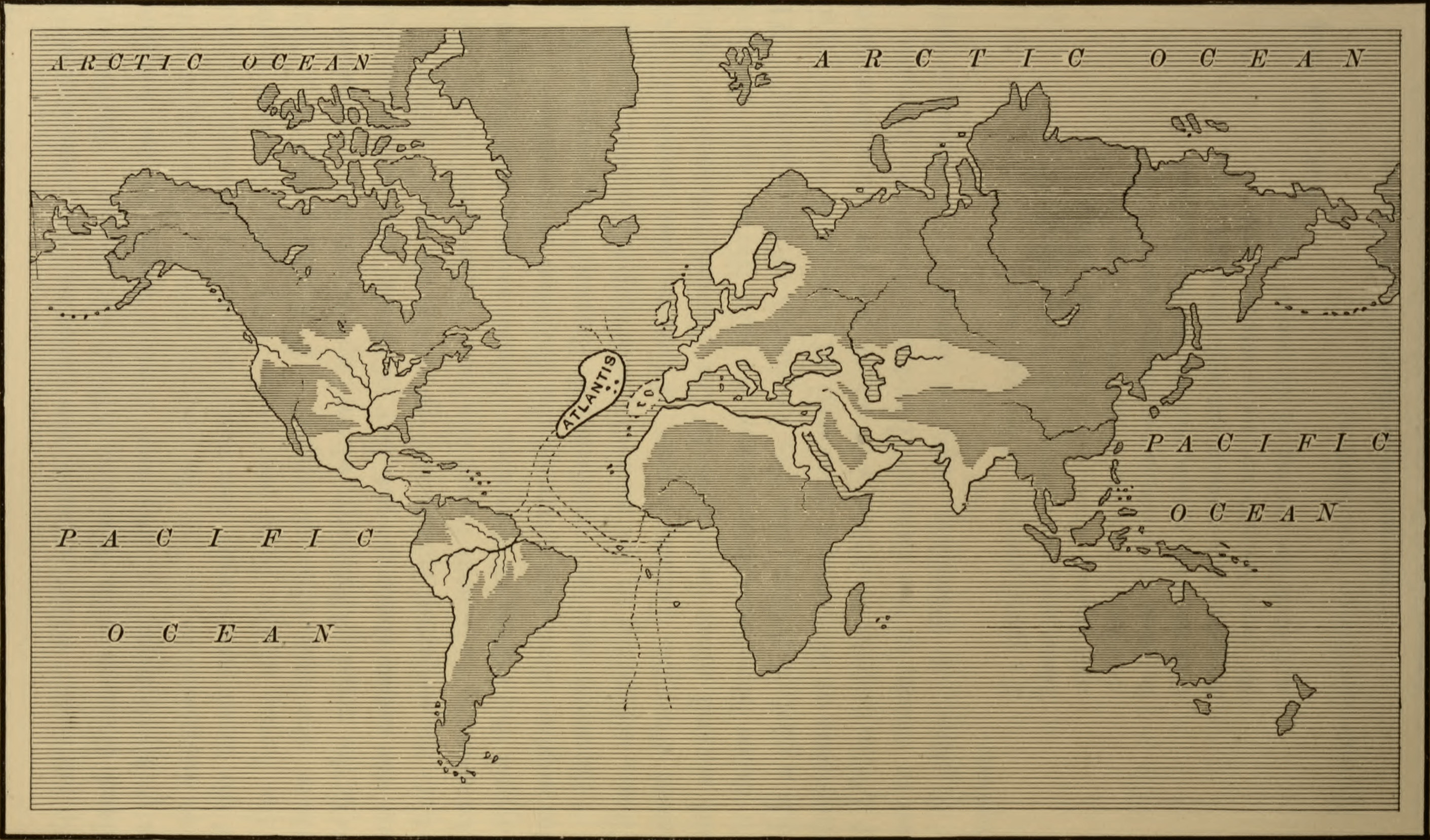
Solon is Plato's source for the story of Atlantis

After completing his work of reform, Solon surrendered his extraordinary authority and traveled abroad for ten years, so that the Athenians could not induce him to repeal any of his laws. (Note: According to Herodotus the country was bound by Solon to maintain his reforms for 10 years, whereas according to Plutarch and the author of the Athenian Constitution (reputedly Aristotle) the contracted period was instead 100 years. A modern scholar considers the time-span given by Herodotus to be historically accurate because it fits the 10 years that Solon was said to have been absent from the country.)

Within four years of Solon's departure, the old social rifts re-appeared, but with some new complications. There were irregularities in the new governmental procedures, elected officials sometimes refused to stand down from their posts and occasionally important posts were left vacant. It has even been said that some people blamed Solon for their troubles. Eventually one of Solon's relatives, Pisistratus, ended the factionalism by force, thus instituting an unconstitutionally gained tyranny. In Plutarch's account, Solon accused Athenians of stupidity and cowardice for allowing this to happen.

Solon's first stop in his travels was Egypt. There, according to Herodotus, he visited the Pharaoh of Egypt, Amasis II. According to Plutarch, he spent some time and discussed philosophy with two Egyptian priests, Psenophis of Heliopolis and Sonchis of Sais. A character in two of Plato's dialogues, Timaeus and Critias, claims Solon visited Neith's temple at Sais and received from the priests there an account of the history of Atlantis. Next, Solon sailed to Cyprus, where he oversaw the construction of a new capital for a local king, who named it Soloi in gratitude.

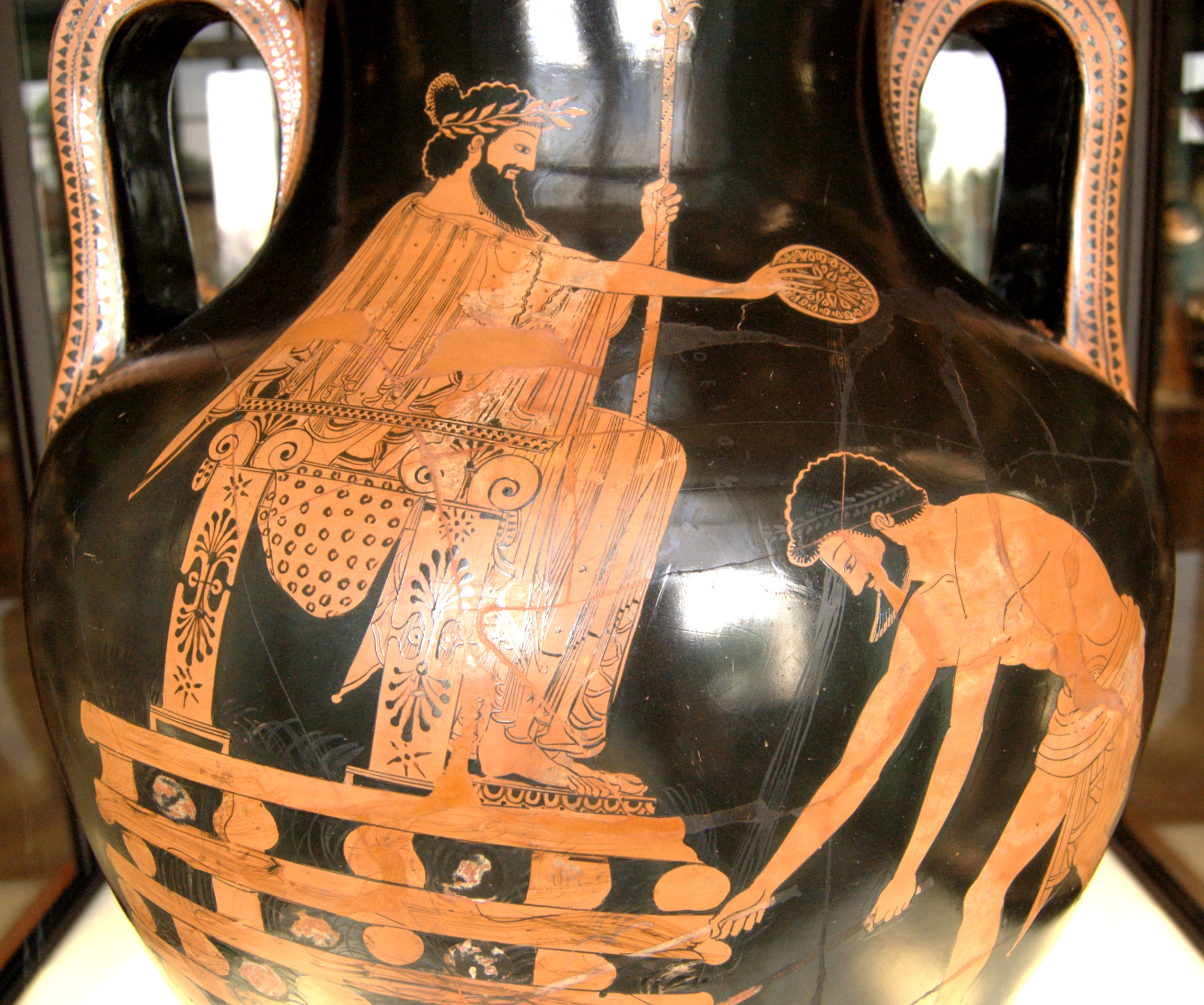
Croesus awaits fiery execution (Attic red-figure amphora, 500–490 BC, Louvre G 197)

Solon's travels finally brought him to Sardis, capital of Lydia. According to Herodotus and Plutarch, he met with Croesus and gave the Lydian king advice, which Croesus failed to appreciate until it was too late. Croesus had considered himself to be the happiest man alive and Solon had advised him, "Count no man happy until he be dead." The reasoning was that at any minute, fortune might turn on even the happiest man and make his life miserable. It was only after he had lost his kingdom to the Persian king Cyrus, while awaiting execution, that Croesus acknowledged the wisdom of Solon's advice.

=== Death and legacy ===
After his return to Athens, Solon became a staunch opponent of Pisistratus. In protest, and as an example to others, Solon stood outside his own home in full armour, urging all who passed to resist the machinations of the would-be tyrant. His efforts were in vain. Solon died shortly after Pisistratus usurped by force the autocratic power that Athens had once freely bestowed upon him. Solon died in Cyprus around the age of 70 and, in accordance with his will, his ashes were scattered around Salamis, the island where he was born.

Pausanias listed Solon among the Seven Sages, whose aphorisms adorned Apollo's temple in Delphi. Stobaeus in the Florilegium relates a story about a symposium where Solon's young nephew was singing a poem of Sappho's: Solon, upon hearing the song, asked the boy to teach him to sing it. When someone asked, "Why should you waste your time on it?", Solon replied, "ἵνα μαθὼν αὐτὸ ἀποθάνω", "So that I may learn it before I die." Ammianus Marcellinus, however, told a similar story about Socrates and the poet Stesichorus, quoting the philosopher's rapture in almost identical terms: ut aliquid sciens amplius e vita discedam, meaning "in order to leave life knowing a little more".

== Historical rivalries ==
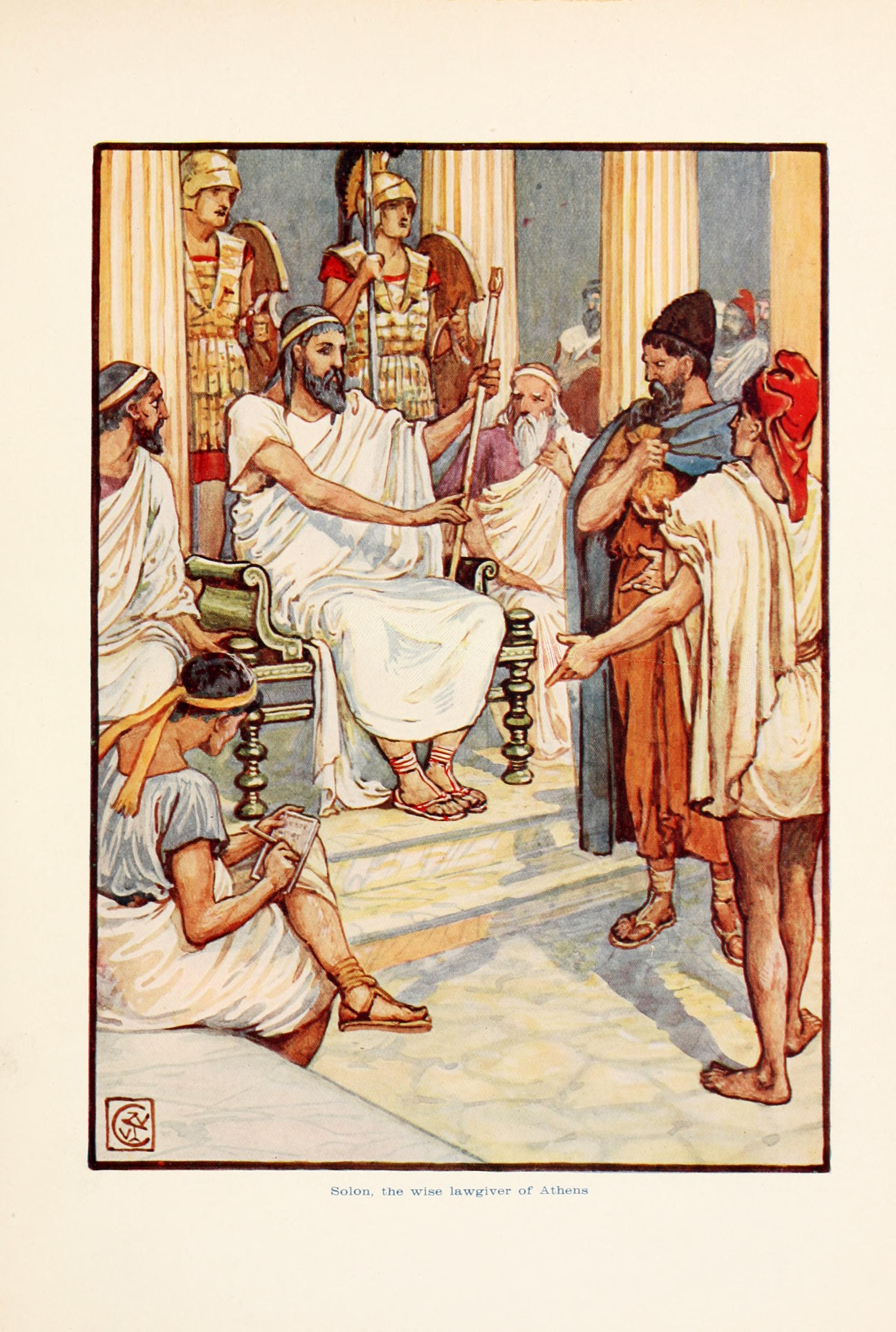
"Solon, the wise lawgiver of Athens", illustration by Walter Crane, from The Story of Greece, told to boys and girls, by Mary Macgregor (1910s)

The social and political upheavals that characterized Athens in Solon's time have been variously interpreted by historians from ancient times to the present day. The historical account of Solon's Athens has evolved over many centuries into a set of contradictory stories or a complex story that might be interpreted in a variety of ways. As further evidence accumulates, and as historians continue to debate the issues, Solon's motivations and the intentions behind his reforms will continue to attract speculation.

Two contemporary historians have identified three distinct historical accounts of Solon's Athens, emphasizing quite different rivalries: economic and/or ideological rivalry, regional rivalry, and rivalry between aristocratic clans. These different accounts provide a convenient basis for an overview of the issues involved.

=== Economic and ideological ===
Economic and ideological rivalry is a common theme in ancient sources. This sort of account emerges from Solon's poems, in which he casts himself in the role of a noble mediator between two intemperate and unruly factions. This same account is substantially taken up about three centuries later by the author of the Aristotelian Athenaion Politeia but with an interesting variation:

... there was conflict between the nobles and the common people for an extended period. For the constitution they were under was oligarchic in every respect and especially in that the poor, along with their wives and children, were in slavery to the rich...All the land was in the hands of a few. And if men did not pay their rents, they themselves and their children were liable to be seized as slaves. The security for all loans was the debtor's prison up to the time of Solon. He was the first people's champion.

Here Solon is presented as a partisan in a democratic cause whereas, judged from the viewpoint of his own poems, he was instead a mediator between rival factions. A still more significant variation in the ancient historical account appears in the writing of Plutarch in the late 1st – early 2nd century AD:

Athens was torn by recurrent conflict about the constitution. The city was divided into as many parties as there were geographical divisions in its territory. For the party of the people of the hills was most in favour of democracy, that of the people of the plain was most in favour of oligarchy, while the third group, the people of the coast, which preferred a mixed form of constitution somewhat between the other two, formed an obstruction and prevented the other groups from gaining control.

=== Regional ===
Regional rivalry is a theme commonly found among modern scholars. "The new picture which emerged was one of strife between regional groups, united by local loyalties and led by wealthy landowners. Their goal was to take control of the central government at Athens and with it dominate over their rivals from other districts of Attica."
Regional factionalism was inevitable in a relatively large territory such as Athens possessed. In most Greek city states, a farmer could conveniently reside in a town and travel to and from his fields every day. According to Thucydides, on the other hand, most Athenians continued to live in rural settlements right up until the Peloponnesian War. The effects of regionalism in a large territory could be seen in Laconia, where Sparta had gained control through intimidation and resettlement of some of its neighbours and enslavement of the rest. Attika in Solon's time seemed to be moving towards a similarly ugly solution with many citizens in danger of being reduced to the status of helots.

=== Clan ===
Rivalry between clans is a theme recently developed by some scholars, based on an appreciation of the political significance of kinship groupings. According to this account, bonds of kinship rather than local loyalties were the decisive influence on events in archaic Athens. An Athenian belonged not only to a phyle or tribe and one of its subdivisions, the phratry or brotherhood, but also to an extended family, clan or genos. It has been argued that these interconnecting units of kinship reinforced a hierarchic structure with aristocratic clans at the top. Thus rivalries between aristocratic clans could engage all levels of society irrespective of any regional ties. In that case, the struggle between rich and poor was the struggle between powerful aristocrats and the weaker affiliates of their rivals or perhaps even with their own rebellious affiliates.

== Solon's reforms ==
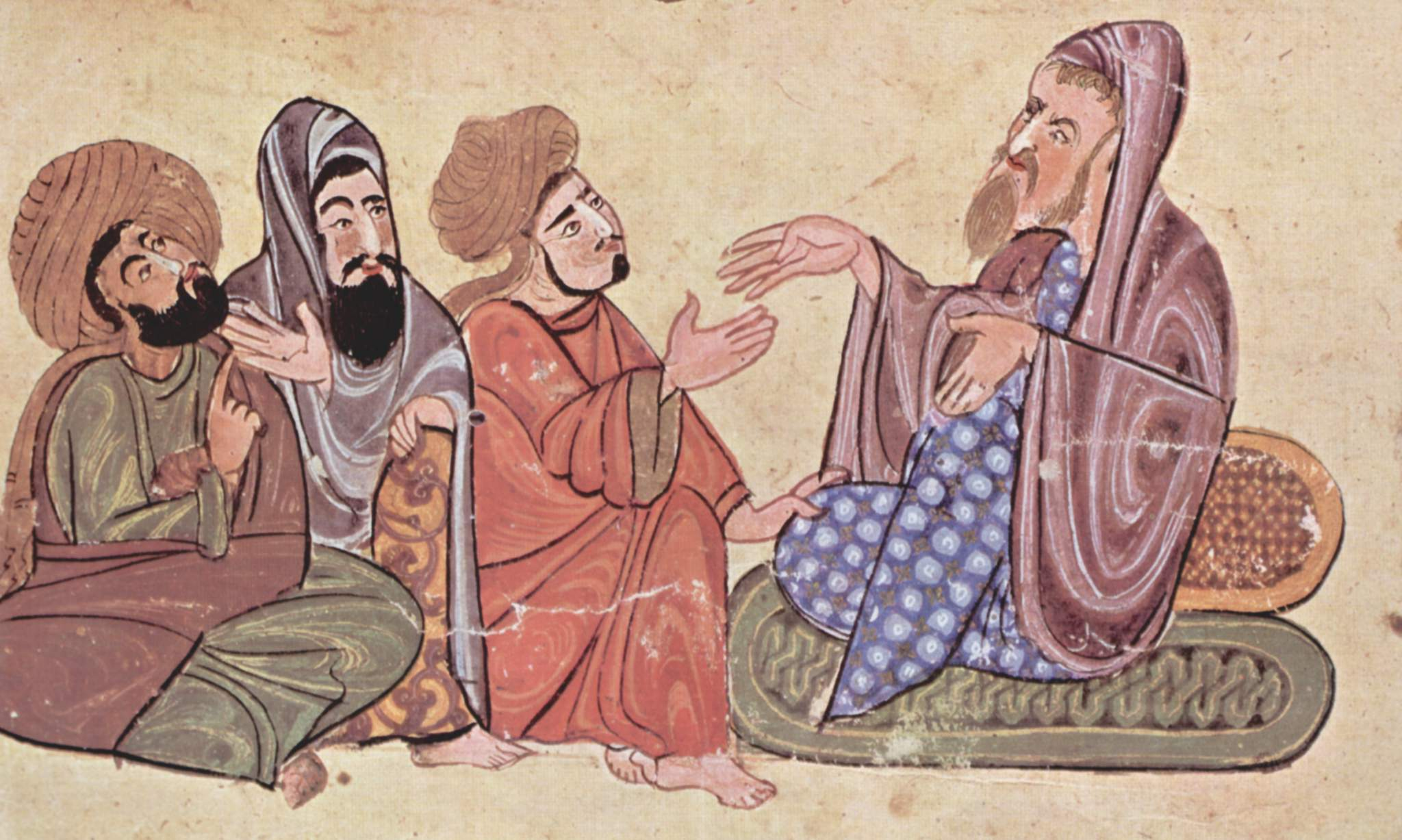
Solon, depicted with pupils in an Islamic miniature

Solon's laws were inscribed on axones, large wooden slabs or cylinders attached to a series of axles that stood upright in the Prytaneion. (Note: These axones appear to have operated on the same principle as a turntable, allowing both convenient storage and ease of access.) Originally the axones recorded laws enacted by Draco in the late 7th century (traditionally 621 BC). Nothing of Draco's codification has survived except for a law relating to homicide, yet there is consensus among scholars that it did not amount to anything like a constitution.

During his visit to Athens, Pausanias, the 2nd century AD geographer reported that the inscribed laws of Solon were still displayed by the Prytaneion. Fragments of the axones were still visible in Plutarch's time but today the only records we have of Solon's laws are fragmentary quotes and comments in literary sources such as those written by Plutarch himself. Moreover, the language of his laws was archaic even by the standards of the fifth century and this caused interpretation problems for ancient commentators. Modern scholars doubt the reliability of these sources and our knowledge of Solon's legislation is therefore actually very limited in its details.

Generally, Solon's reforms appear to have been constitutional, economic, moral, and sexual in their scope. This distinction, though somewhat artificial, does at least provide a convenient framework within which to consider the laws that have been attributed to Solon. Some short-term consequences of his reforms are considered at the end of the section.

=== Constitutional ===
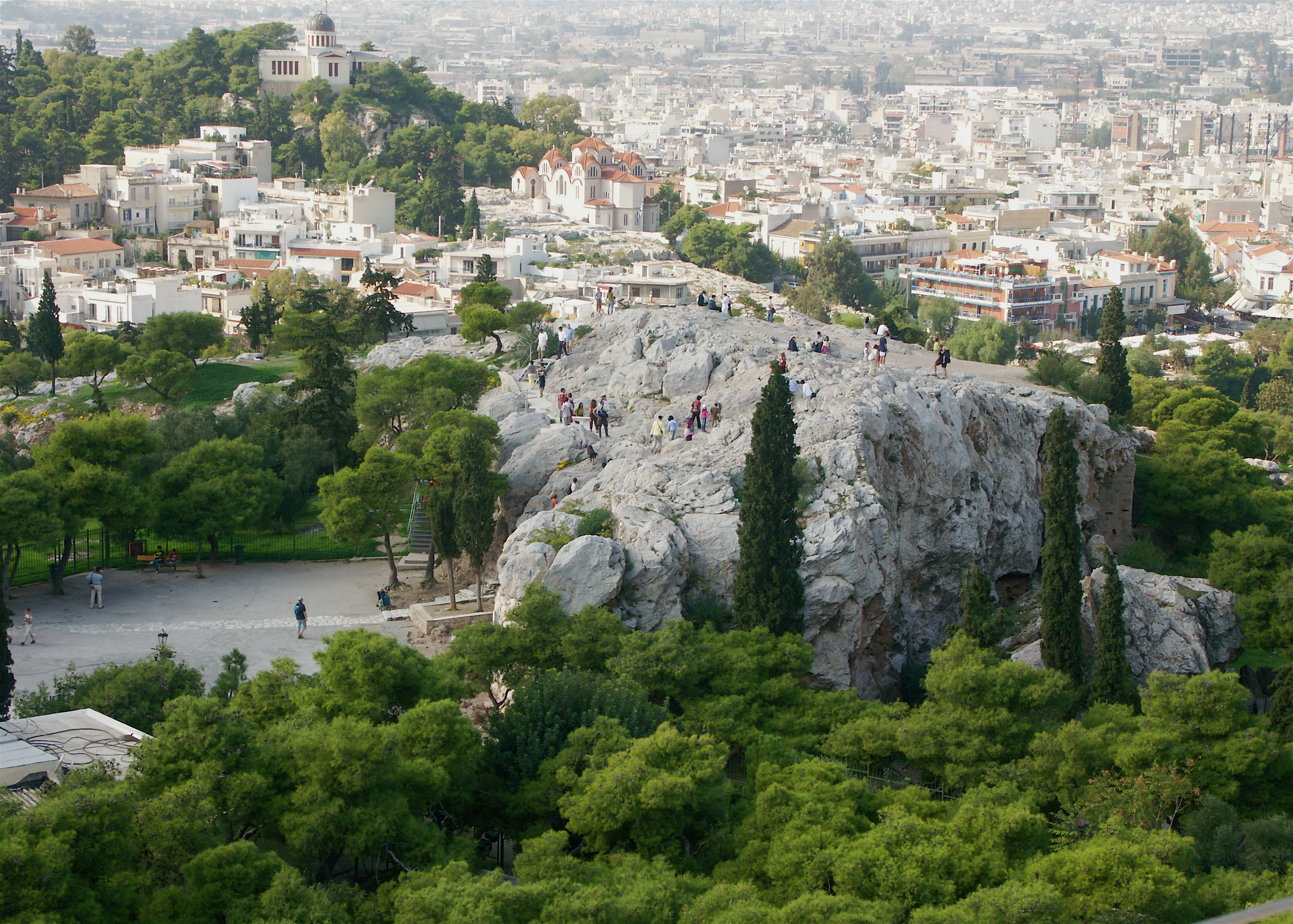
The Areopagus, as viewed from the Acropolis, is a monolith where Athenian aristocrats decided important matters of state during Solon's time.

Depending on how we interpret the historical facts known to us, Solon's constitutional reforms were either a radical anticipation of democratic government, or they merely provided a plutocratic flavour to a stubbornly aristocratic regime, or else the truth lies somewhere between these two extremes. (Note: "In all areas then it was the work of Solon which was decisive in establishing the foundations for the development of a full democracy."—Marylin B. Arthur, "The Origins of the Western Attitude Toward Women", in Women in the Ancient World: The Arethusa Papers, John Patrick Sullivan (ed.), State University of New York (1984), p. 30. "In making their own evaluation of Solon, the ancient sources concentrated on what were perceived to be the democratic features of the constitution. But ... Solon was given his extraordinary commission by the nobles, who wanted him to eliminate the threat that the position of the nobles as a whole would be overthrown".— Stanton, G. R. Athenian Politics c. 800–500 BC: A Sourcebook, Routledge, London (1990), p. 76.)

Before Solon's reforms, the Athenian state was administered by nine archons appointed or elected annually by the Areopagus on the basis of noble birth and wealth. (Note: The Areopagus comprised former archons and it therefore had, in addition to the power of appointment, extraordinary influence as a consultative body. The nine archons took the oath of office while ceremonially standing on a stone in the agora, declaring their readiness to dedicate a golden statue if they should ever be found to have violated the laws.) There was an assembly of Athenian citizens (the Ekklesia) but the lowest class (the Thetes) was not admitted and its deliberative procedures were controlled by the nobles. There therefore seemed to be no means by which an archon could be called to account for breach of oath unless the Areopagus favoured his prosecution.

According to the Athenian Constitution, Solon legislated for all citizens to be admitted into the Ekklesia and for a court (the Heliaia) to be formed from all the citizens. The Heliaia appears to have been the Ekklesia, or some representative portion of it, sitting as a jury. By giving common people the power not only to elect officials but also to call them to account, Solon appears to have established the foundations of a true republic. (Note: Some scholars have doubted whether Solon actually included the Thetes in the Ekklesia, this being considered too bold a move for any aristocrat in the archaic period. Ancient sources credit Solon with the creation of a Council of Four Hundred, drawn from the four Athenian tribes to serve as a steering committee for the enlarged Ekklesia. However, many modern scholars have doubted this also.)

==== Classes ====
There is consensus among scholars that Solon lowered the requirements – those that existed in terms of financial and social qualifications – which applied to election to public office. The Solonian constitution divided citizens into four political classes defined according to assessable property a classification that might previously have served the state for military or taxation purposes only. The standard unit for this assessment was one medimnos (approximately 12 gallons) of cereals and yet the kind of classification set out below might be considered too simplistic to be historically accurate.

- Pentakosiomedimnoi
  - valued at 500 medimnoi or more of cereals annually.
  - eligible to serve as strategoi (generals or military governors)
- Hippeis
  - valued at 300 medimnoi or more annually.
  - approximating to the medieval class of knights, they had enough wealth to equip themselves for the cavalry
- Zeugitai
  - valued at 200 medimnoi or more annually.
  - approximating to the medieval class of yeoman, they had enough wealth to equip themselves for the infantry (hoplite)
- Thetes
  - valued up to 199 medimnoi annually or less
  - manual workers or sharecroppers, they served voluntarily in the role of personal servant, or as auxiliaries armed for instance with the sling or as rowers in the navy.

According to the Athenian Constitution, only the pentakosiomedimnoi were eligible for election to high office as archons and therefore only they gained admission into the Areopagus. A modern view affords the same privilege to the hippeis. The top three classes were eligible for a variety of lesser posts and only the thetes were excluded from all public office.

=== Economic ===
The real motives behind Solon's economic reforms are as questionable as his real motives for constitutional reform. Were the poor being forced to serve the needs of a changing economy, was the economy being reformed to serve the needs of the poor, or were Solon's policies the manifestation of a struggle taking place between poorer citizens and the aristocrats?

Solon's economic reforms need to be understood in the context of the primitive, subsistence economy that prevailed both before and after his time. Most Athenians were still living in rural settlements right up to the Peloponnesian War. Opportunities for trade even within the Athenian borders were limited. The typical farming family, even in classical times, barely produced enough to satisfy its own needs. Opportunities for international trade were minimal. It has been estimated that, even in Roman times, goods rose 40% in value for every 100 miles they were carried over land, but only 1.3% for the same distance were they carried by ship and yet there is no evidence that Athens possessed any merchant ships until around 525 BC. Until then, the narrow warship doubled as a cargo vessel. Athens, like other Greek city states in the 7th century BC, was faced with increasing population pressures and by about 525 BC it was able to feed itself only in good years.

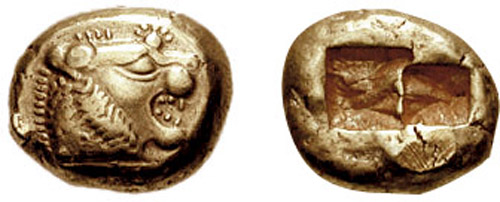
The Croeseid, one of the earliest known coins. It was minted in the early 6th century BC in Lydia. Coins such as this might have made their way to Athens in Solon's time but it is unlikely that Athens had its own coinage at this period.

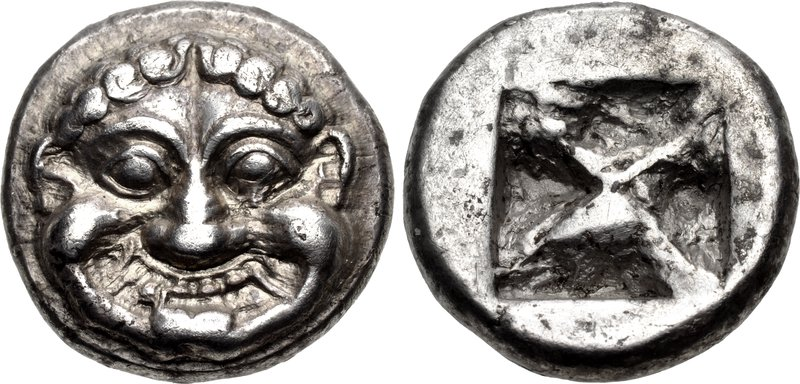
The earliest known coinage of Athens, c. 545–515 BC

Solon's reforms can thus be seen to have taken place at a crucial period of economic transition, when a subsistence rural economy increasingly required the support of a nascent commercial sector. The specific economic reforms credited to Solon are these:

- Fathers were encouraged to find trades for their sons; if they did not, there would be no legal requirement for sons to maintain their fathers in old age.
- Foreign tradesmen were encouraged to settle in Athens; those who did would be granted citizenship, provided they brought their families with them.
- Cultivation of olives was encouraged; the export of all other fruits was prohibited.
- Competitiveness of Athenian commerce was promoted through revision of weights and measures, possibly based on successful standards already in use elsewhere, such as Aegina or Euboia or, according to the ancient account but unsupported by modern scholarship, Argos.

==== Coinage ====
It is generally assumed, on the authority of ancient commentators, that Solon also reformed the Athenian coinage. However, recent numismatic studies now lead to the conclusion that Athens probably had no coinage until around 560 BC, well after Solon's reforms. Nevertheless, there are now reasons to suggest that monetization had already begun before Solon's reforms. By the early sixth century the Athenians were using silver in the form of a variety of bullion silver pieces for monetary payments. Drachma and obol as a term of bullion value had already been adopted, although the corresponding standard weights were probably unstable.

==== Foreign trade ====
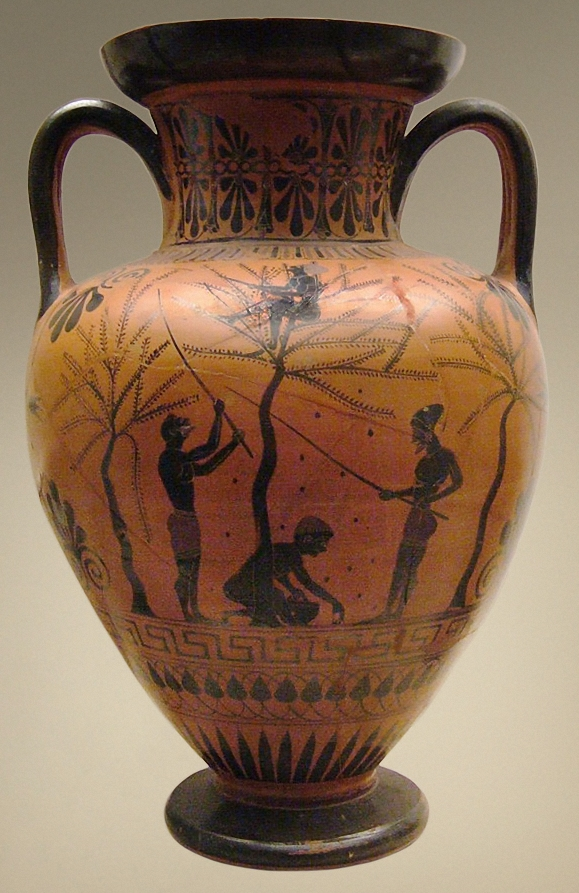
This 6th century Athenian black-figure urn, in the British Museum, depicts the olive harvest. Many farmers, enslaved for debt, would have worked on large estates for their creditors.

Solon's economic reforms succeeded in stimulating foreign trade. Athenian black-figure pottery was exported in increasing quantities and good quality throughout the Aegean between 600 BC and 560 BC, a success story that coincided with a decline in trade in Corinthian pottery. The ban on the export of grain might be understood as a relief measure for the benefit of the poor. However, the encouragement of olive production for export could actually have led to increased hardship for many Athenians to the extent that it led to a reduction in the amount of land dedicated to grain. Moreover, an olive tree produces no fruit for the first six years (but farmers' difficulty of lasting until payback may also give rise to a mercantilist argument in favour of supporting them through that, since the British case illustrates that "One domestic policy that had a lasting impact was the conversion of 'waste lands' to agricultural use. Mercantilists felt that to maximize a nation's power all land and resources had to be used to their utmost").

=== Moral ===
In his poems, Solon portrays Athens as being under threat from the unrestrained greed and arrogance of its citizens. Even the earth (Gaia), the mighty mother of the gods, had been enslaved. The visible symbol of this perversion of the natural and social order was a boundary marker called a horos, a wooden or stone pillar indicating that a farmer was in debt or under contractual obligation to someone else, either a noble patron or a creditor.

==== Seisachtheia ====
Up until Solon's time, land was the inalienable property of a family or clan and it could not be sold or mortgaged. This was no disadvantage to a clan with large landholdings since it could always rent out farms in a sharecropping system. A family struggling on a small farm however could not use the farm as security for a loan even if it owned the farm. Instead the farmer would have to offer himself and his family as security, providing some form of slave labour in lieu of repayment. Equally, a family might voluntarily pledge part of its farm income or labour to a powerful clan in return for its protection. Farmers subject to these sorts of arrangements were loosely known as hektemoroi indicating that they either paid or kept a sixth of a farm's annual yield. In the event of 'bankruptcy', or failure to honour the contract stipulated by the horoi, farmers and their families could in fact be sold into slavery.

Solon's reform of these injustices was later known and celebrated among Athenians as the seisachtheia (shaking off of burdens). As with all his reforms, there is considerable scholarly debate about its real significance. Many scholars are content to accept the account given by the ancient sources, interpreting it as a cancellation of debts, while others interpret it as the abolition of a type of feudal relationship, and some prefer to explore new possibilities for interpretation. The reforms included:

- annulment of all contracts symbolised by the horoi.
- prohibition on a debtor's person being used as security for a loan, i.e., debt slavery.
- release of all Athenians who had been enslaved.

The removal of the horoi clearly provided immediate economic relief for the most oppressed group in Attica, and it also brought an immediate end to the enslavement of Athenians by their countrymen. Some Athenians had already been sold into slavery abroad and some had fled abroad to escape enslavement – Solon proudly records in verse the return of this diaspora. It has been cynically observed, however, that few of these unfortunates were likely to have been recovered. It has been observed also that the seisachtheia not only removed slavery and accumulated debt but may also have removed the ordinary farmer's only means of obtaining further credit.

The seisachtheia however was merely one set of reforms within a broader agenda of moral reformation. Other reforms included:

- the abolition of extravagant dowries.
- legislation against abuses within the system of inheritance, specifically with relation to the epikleros (i.e. a female who had no brothers to inherit her father's property and who was traditionally required to marry her nearest paternal relative in order to produce an heir to her father's estate).
- entitlement of any citizen to take legal action on behalf of another.
- the disenfranchisement of any citizen who might refuse to take up arms in times of civil strife, and war, a measure that was intended to counteract dangerous levels of political apathy.

Demosthenes claimed that the city's subsequent golden age included "personal modesty and frugality" among the Athenian aristocracy.

=== Sexual ===
As a regulator of Athenian society, Solon, according to some authors, also formalized its sexual mores. According to a surviving fragment from a work ("Brothers") by the comic playwright Philemon, Solon established publicly funded brothels at Athens in order to "democratize" the availability of sexual pleasure. While the veracity of this comic account is open to doubt, at least one modern author considers it significant that in Classical Athens, three hundred or so years after the death of Solon, there existed a discourse that associated his reforms with an increased availability of heterosexual contacts.

Ancient authors also say that Solon regulated pederastic relationships in Athens; this has been presented as an adaptation of custom to the new structure of the polis. According to various authors, ancient lawgivers (and therefore Solon by implication) drew up a set of laws that were intended to promote and safeguard the institution of pederasty and to control abuses against freeborn boys. In particular, the orator Aeschines cites laws excluding slaves from wrestling halls and forbidding them to enter pederastic relationships with the sons of citizens. Accounts of Solon's laws by 4th-century orators like Aeschines, however, are considered unreliable for a number of reasons:

Attic pleaders did not hesitate to attribute to him (Solon) any law which suited their case, and later writers had no criterion by which to distinguish earlier from later works. Nor can any complete and authentic collection of his statutes have survived for ancient scholars to consult.

Besides the alleged legislative aspect of Solon's involvement with pederasty, there were also suggestions of personal involvement. Ancient readers concluded, based on his own erotic poetry, that Solon himself had a preference for boys. According to some ancient authors Solon had taken the future tyrant Pisistratus as his eromenos. Aristotle, writing around 330 BC, attempted to refute that belief, claiming that "those are manifestly talking nonsense who pretend that Solon was the lover of Pisistratus, for their ages do not admit of it", as Solon was about thirty years older than Pisistratus. Nevertheless, the tradition persisted. Four centuries later Plutarch ignored Aristotle's skepticism and recorded the following anecdote, supplemented with his own conjectures:

And they say Solon loved [Pisistratus]; and that is the reason, I suppose, that when afterwards they differed about the government, their enmity never produced any hot and violent passion, they remembered their old kindnesses, and retained "Still in its embers living the strong fire" of their love and dear affection.

A century after Plutarch, Aelian also said that Pisistratus had been Solon's eromenos. Despite its persistence, however, it is not known whether the account is historical or fabricated. It has been suggested that the tradition presenting a peaceful and happy coexistence between Solon and Pisistratus was cultivated during the latter's dominion, in order to legitimize his own rule, as well as that of his sons. Whatever its source, later generations lent credence to the narrative. Solon's presumed pederastic desire was thought in antiquity to have found expression also in his poetry, which is today represented only in a few surviving fragments. The authenticity of all the poetic fragments attributed to Solon is however uncertain – in particular, pederastic aphorisms ascribed by some ancient sources to Solon have been ascribed by other sources to Theognis instead.

== Poems ==
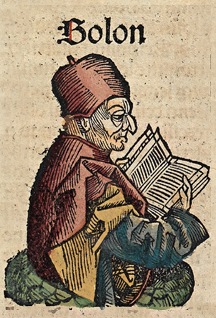
Solon, depicted as a medieval scholar in the Nuremberg Chronicle

It is recorded that Solon wrote poetry for pleasure, as patriotic propaganda, and in defence of his constitutional reform. Solon's verses have come down to us in fragmentary quotations by ancient authors such as Plutarch and Demosthenes, who used them to illustrate their own arguments. It is possible that some fragments have been wrongly attributed to him and some scholars have detected interpolations by later authors. He was also the first citizen of Athens to reference the goddess Athena (fr. 4.1–4).

The literary merit of Solon's verse is generally considered unexceptional. Solon's poetry can be said to appear 'self-righteous' and 'pompous' at times and he once composed an elegy with moral advice for a more gifted elegiac poet, Mimnermus. Most of the extant verses show him writing in the role of a political activist determined to assert personal authority and leadership. They have been described by the German classicist Wilamowitz as a "versified harangue" (Eine Volksrede in Versen). According to Plutarch, however, Solon originally wrote poetry for amusement, discussing pleasure in a popular rather than philosophical way. Solon's elegiac style is said to have been influenced by the example of Tyrtaeus. He also wrote iambic and trochaic verses, which, according to one modern scholar, are livelier and more direct than his elegies and possibly paved the way for the iambics of Athenian drama.

Solon's verses are mainly significant for historical rather than aesthetic reasons, as a personal record of his reforms and attitudes. However, poetry is not an ideal genre for communicating facts and very little detailed information can be derived from the surviving fragments. According to Solon the poet, Solon the reformer was a voice for political moderation in Athens at a time when his fellow citizens were increasingly polarized by social and economic differences:

πολλοὶ γὰρ πλουτεῦσι κακοί, ἀγαθοὶ δὲ πένονται:
ἀλλ' ἡμεῖς αὐτοῖς οὐ διαμειψόμεθα
τῆς ἀρετῆς τὸν πλοῦτον: ἐπεὶ τὸ μὲν ἔμπεδον αἰεί,
χρήματα δ' ἀνθρώπων ἄλλοτε ἄλλος ἔχει.

Translation:

Some wicked men are rich, some good are poor;
We will not change our virtue for their store:
Virtue's a thing that none can take away,
But money changes owners all the day.

Here translated by the English poet John Dryden, Solon's words define a 'moral high ground' where differences between rich and poor can be reconciled or maybe just ignored. His poetry indicates that he attempted to use his extraordinary legislative powers to establish a peaceful settlement between the country's rival factions:

ἔστην δ' ἀμφιβαλὼν κρατερὸν σάκος ἀμφοτέροισι:
νικᾶν δ' οὐκ εἴασ' οὐδετέρους ἀδίκως.

Translation:

Before them both, I held my shield of might
And let not either touch the other's right.

His attempts evidently were misunderstood:

χαῦνα μὲν τότ' ἐφράσαντο, νῦν δέ μοι χολούμενοι
λοξὸν ὀφθαλμοῖς ὁρῶσι πάντες ὥστε δήϊον.

Translation:

Formerly they boasted of me vainly; with averted eyes
Now they look askance upon me; friends no more but enemies.

== See also ==
- Adultery in Classical Athens
- Solonia, a genus of flowering plants named after Solon

== Bibliography ==
- A. Andrews, Greek Society, Penguin, 1967
- J. Blok and A. Lardinois (eds), Solon of Athens: New Historical and Philological Approaches, Leiden, Brill, 2006
- Cary, Cambridge Ancient History, Vol. III, Cambridge Uni. Press, 1925
- Connor, The New Politicians of Fifth-Century Athens, Princeton, 1971
- R. Develin, Historia, Vol. 26, 1977
- Dillon, M and L Garland. Ancient Greece: Social and Historical Documents from Archaic Times to the Death of Alexander the Great. London: Routledge, 2010.
- V. Ehrenberg, From Solon to Socrates: Greek History and Civilization, Routledge, 1973
- J. Ellis and G. Stanton, Phoenix, Vol. 22, 1968, 95–99
- G. Forrest, 'Greece: The History of the Archaic Period', in The Oxford History of the Classical World, ed. Boardman J., Griffin J. and Murray O., Oxford University Press, New York, 1995
- Frost, 'Tribal Politics and the Civic State', AJAH, 1976
- P. Garnsey, Famine and Food Supply in Graeco-Roman World, Cambridge Uni. Press, 1988
- J. Goldstein, Historia, Vol. 21, 1972
- M. Grant, The Rise of the Greeks. New York: Charles Scribner's Sons, 1988
- E. Harris, 'A New Solution to the Riddle of the Seisachtheia', in The Development of the Polis in Archaic Greece, eds. L. Mitchell and P. Rhodes, Routledge, 1997
- C. Hignett, A History of the Athenian Constitution to the End of the Fifth Century B.C., Oxford University Press, 1952
- K. Hubbard, Homosexuality in Greece and Rome: A Sourcebook of Basic Documents, Uni. California Press, 2003
- H. Innis, Empire and Communications, Rowman and Littlefield, 2007
- G. Kirk, Historia, Vol. 26, 1977
- D. Lewis, 'Cleisthenes and Attica', Historia, 12, 1963
- M. Miller, Arethusa, Vol. 4, 1971
- I. Morris, The Growth of City States in the First Millennium BC, Stanford, 2005
- Björn Onken, "Ein Seehändler unter den sieben Weisen? Anmerkungen zur Biographie des Solon" [A sea merchant among the seven sages? Notes on the biography of Solon]. In: Ruffing, Kai; Droß-Krüpe, Kerstin (eds) (2018). Emas non quod opus est, sed quod necesse est. Beiträge zur Wirtschafts-, Sozial-, Rezeptions- und Wissenschaftsgeschichte der Antike. Festschrift für Hans-Joachim Drexhage zum 70. Geburtstag. Philippika, vol. 125. Wiesbaden: Harrassowitz, pp. 37–44.
- M. Ostwald, From Popular Sovereignty to the Sovereignty of the Law: Law, Society and Politics in Fifth-Century Athens, Berkeley, 1986
- P. Rhodes, A Commentary on the Aristotelian Athenian Politeia, Oxford University Press, 1981
- K. Robb, Literacy and Paideia in Ancient Greece, Oxford University Press, 1994
- R. Sealey, 'Regionalism in Archaic Athens', Historia, 9, 1960
- G. R. Stanton, Athenian Politics c. 800–500 BC: A Sourcebook, London, Routledge, 1990
- W. Woodhouse, 'Solon the Liberator: A Study of the Agrarian Problem', in Attika in the Seventh Century, Oxford University Press, 1938

=== Collections of Solon's surviving verses ===
- Martin Litchfield West, Iambi et elegi Graeci ante Alexandrum cantati, v. 2: Callinus. Mimnermus. Semonides. Solon. Tyrtaeus. Minora Adespota, Oxford: Clarendon Press, 1972, revised edition 1992 x + 246 pp.
- T. Hudson-Williams, Early Greek Elegy: Elegiac Fragments of Callinus, Archilochus, Mimmermus, Tyrtaeus, Solon, Xenophanes, and Others, Taylor and Francis (1926), ISBN 0-8240-7773-3.
- H. Miltner Fragmente / Solon, Vienna (1955)
- Christoph Mülke, Solons politische Elegien und Iamben (Fr. 1–13, 32–37 West), Munich (2002), ISBN 3-598-77726-4.
- Noussia-Fantuzzi, Maria, Solon the Athenian, the Poetic Fragments. Brill (2010).
- Eberhard Preime, Solon: Dichtungen. Sämtliche Fragmente. Munich (1940).
- Kathleen Freeman, The Work and Life of Solon, with a translation of his poems, Cardiff, University of Wales Press Board 1926. OCLC 756460254

=== Collections of Solon's laws ===
- Leão, D. F.; Rhodes, P. J. (2016). The Laws of Solon: A New Edition with Introduction, Translation and Commentary. Bloomsbury Publishing. ISBN 978-0-85773-930-8.
- Ruschenbusch, Eberhard (1966). Nomoi. Die Fragmente des Solonischen Gesetzeswerkes. Wiesbaden: F. Steiner.
- Schmitz, Winfried (2023). Leges Draconis et Solonis (LegDrSol): eine neue Edition der Gesetze Drakons und Solons mit Übersetzung und historischer Einordnung. Stuttgart: Franz Steiner Verlag. ISBN 9783515133616.
