= Sonchis of Sais =

6th century BC Egyptian priest

Sonchis of Saïs or the Saïte (Ancient Greek: Σῶγχις ὁ Σαΐτης, Sō̂nkhis o Saḯtēs; fl. 594 BC) was an Egyptian priest, who is mentioned in Greek writings for relating the account of Atlantis. His status as a historical figure is a matter of debate.

The Platonic dialogues Timaeus and Critias, written around 360 BC, recount (through the voice of Critias) how the Athenian statesman Solon (638–558 BC) traveled to Egypt and in the city of Sais encountered the priests of the goddess Neith. A very aged priest tells him that 9000 years earlier, Athens had been in conflict with the great power of Atlantis, which was then destroyed in a catastrophe.

Plato's dialogue does not mention a name for the priest, but Plutarch (46–120 AD), in his Life of Solon identified the aged priest as Sonchis:

Near Nilus' mouth, by fair Canopus' shores, and spent some time in study with Psenophis of Heliopolis, and Sonchis the Saïte, the most learned of all the priests; from whom, as Plato says, getting knowledge of the Atlantic story, he put it into a poem, and proposed to bring it to the knowledge of the Greeks.

Plutarch gives a more detailed description on the Greek philosophers who visited Egypt and received advice by the Egyptian priests in his book On Isis and Osiris. Thus, Thales of Miletus, Eudoxus of Cnidus, Solon, Pythagoras, (some say Lycurgus of Sparta also) and Plato, traveled into Egypt and conversed with the priests. Eudoxus was instructed by Chonupheus of Memphis, Solon by Sonchis of Saïs and Pythagoras by Oenuphis of Heliopolis.
