= Hippeis =

Ancient Greek social class, those who could afford to do service as cavalry

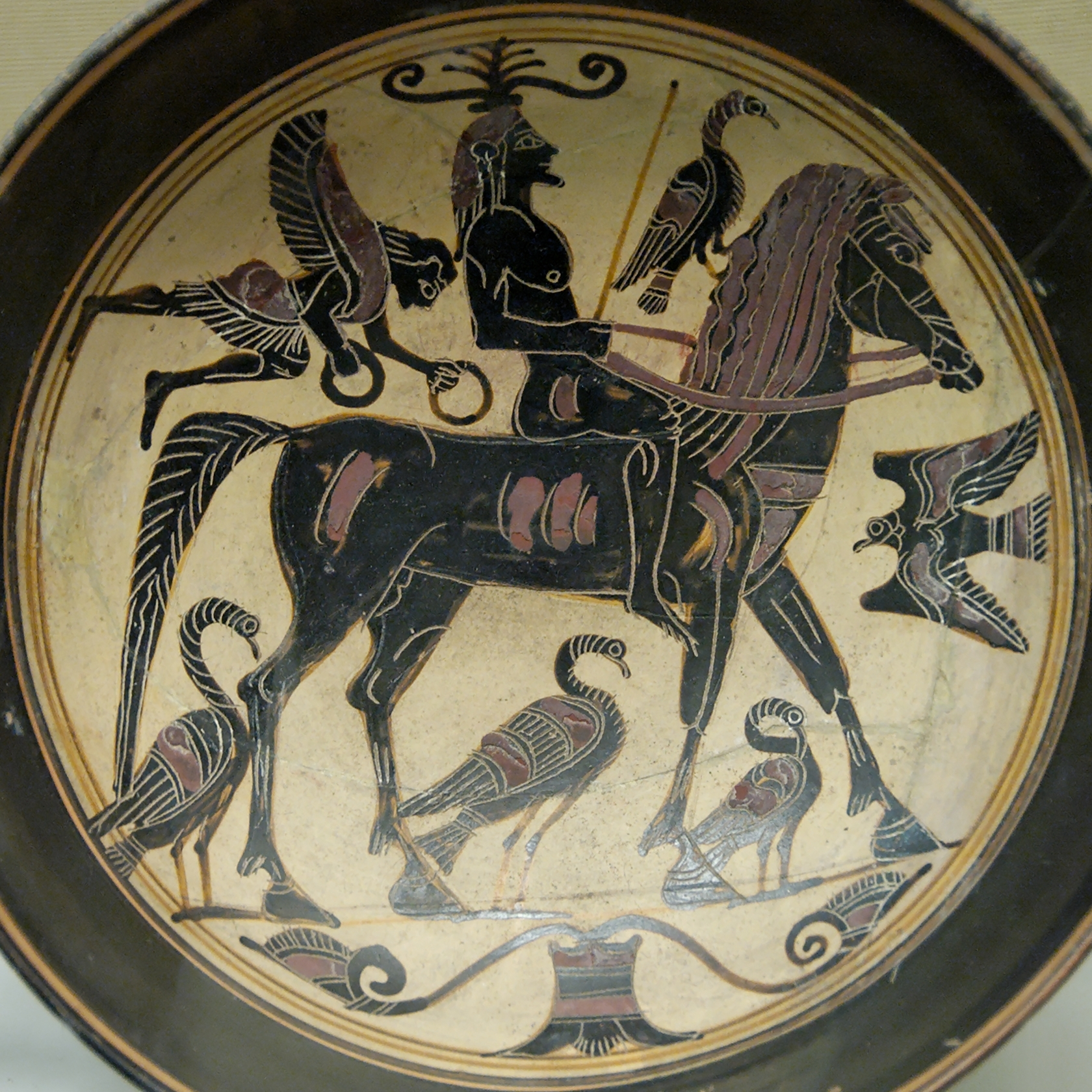
A Laconian black-figured cup by Rider Painter featuring a member of the hippeus.

Hippeis (Ancient Greek: ἱππεῖς, singular ἱππεύς, hippeus) is a Greek term for cavalry. In ancient Athenian society, after the political reforms of Solon, the hippeus was the second highest of the four social classes. It was composed of men who had at least 300 medimnoi or their equivalent as yearly income. According to the Timocratic Constitution, the average citizen had a yearly income of less than 200 medimnoi. This gave the men who made 300 medimnoi the ability to purchase and maintain a war horse during their service to the state.

Its counterparts were the Roman equites (equestrians) and medieval knights.

== Early formation ==
In Sparta, the hippeus was the royal guard of honour. It consisted of 300 Spartan youths under the age of thirty. They would serve as heavily armed infantry soldiers in the King's bodyguard. The Athenian cavalry was formed after the Greco-Persian War in the 5th century BC; it originally consisted of 300 men and then increased to 1,200 men following Athens' Golden Age. This included 200 mounted bowmen (hippotoxōtæ), replaced between 395 and 360BC by the javelin-armed prodromoi, and 1,000 Athenian citizens. The hippeus continued drilling in times of peace. They also took part in processions at public festivals. They were commanded by two hipparchi, who superintended the levy. Subordinated to each hipparch were five phylarchi, who each commanded a phyla. Both sets of officers were drawn from the two highest classes. It was the duty of the boule (council) to see that the cavalry was in good condition and to examine new members with respect to their equipment and eligibility.

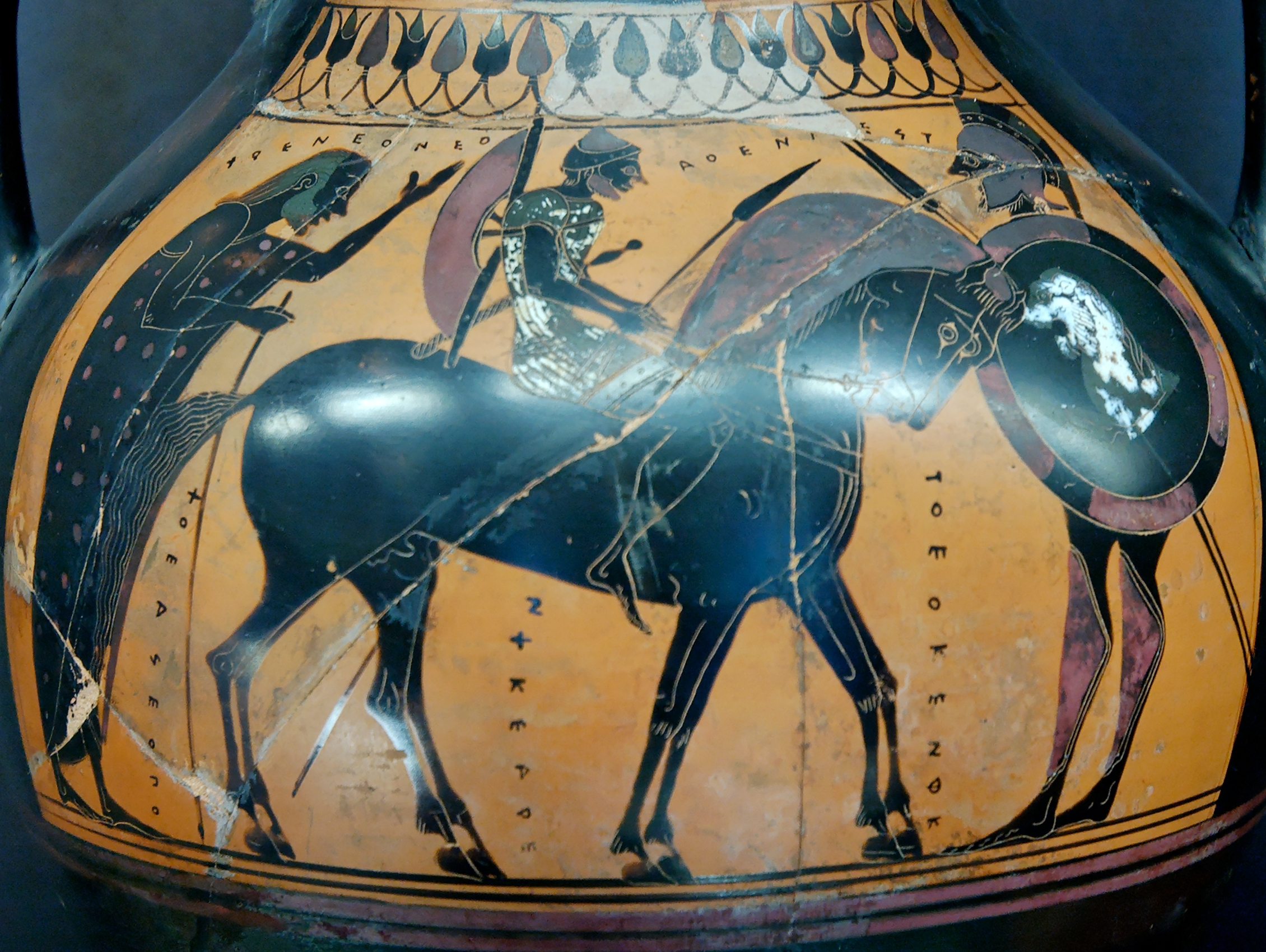
Fully armed Hippeus. Attic black-figure amphora, 550–540 BC (Louvre)

The number of horsemen dispatched was determined by the decree of the popular assembly. Every horseman received equipment money on joining and a subsidy for keeping a groom and two horses; this grew to be an annual grant from the state, amounting to forty talents, but regular pay was only given in the field.

=== Sparta's cavalry ===
In 424 BC, a regular body of horses was formed, remedying long-standing neglect when compared with the infantry. The rich had only to provide horses, equipment, and armour; in time of war, those deemed unfit for service as hoplites were drafted to the cavalry and dispatched without any preliminary drill. In later times, every hoplite mora seems to have been allotted 60 cavalry. By enlisting mercenaries and introducing allies into their forces, the Spartans eventually obtained better cavalry.

== Citizen cavalry ==
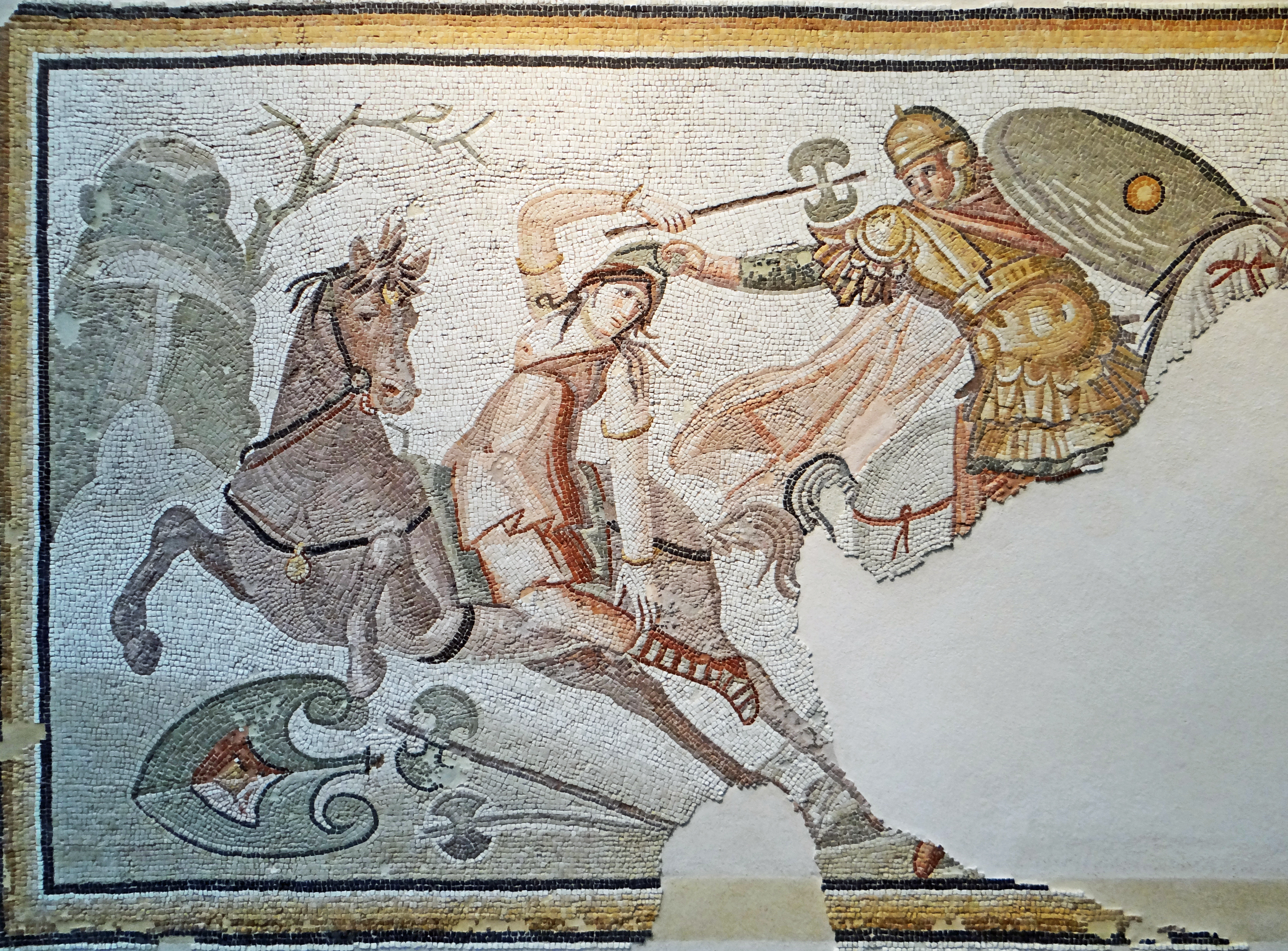
Roman mosaic depicting hippeus in combat with Amazon, 4th century AD (Louvre)

The utility of the Greek citizen-cavalry was low on account of their heavy armor, their metal helmet, and their coat of mail, their metal-fringed kilts, their cuisses reaching to the knee and their leather leggings. They did not take shields into battle. As offensive weapons, they had a straight two-edged sword and a spear, used either as a lance or thrown as a javelin. Horseshoes and stirrups were unknown to the Greeks. The closest approximation to a saddle was either a saddle cloth or a piece of felt that was firmly fastened under the horse's belly. The Thessalians were considered the best riders. Trained in horsemanship as well as infantry warfare, the Sacred Band of Thebes may have accompanied the great Theban cavalry commander Pelopidas to Pelopidas's fatal confrontation with Alexander of Pherae in 364 (Pelopidas taught Philip II of Macedon many cavalry skills). Cavalry first became important in the Macedonian army under Philip II of Macedon and his son Alexander the Great. Although in earlier times the number of horsemen in the Greek forces was low, in Alexander's later army they formed nearly a sixth. The Macedonian cavalry was divided into heavy and light, both consisting of squadrons (ilai) of an average strength of 200 men. The light cavalry, which was formed under the name of prodromoi (skirmishers), consisted of Macedonian sarissophoroi, so-called from the sarissa, a lance from 14 to 16 feet (4.9 m) long (Polybius, XVIII, 12), and of Thracian horsemen. The heavy-cavalry men each had a mounted servant and probably a led horse to transport baggage and forage. After Alexander, Tarentini equites, or light-armed spearmen, with two horses each, emerged (192 BC, Livy, XXXV 28, 29).

== Evolution ==
Three main evolutionary stages transpired in ancient Greece, starting in the Mycenaean period approximately 1400 BC. The first stage consisted of turning a regular horse into a war horse and using it to pull a chariot, which was used to carry infantrymen to battle and to transport the injured. In the second stage, the chariot was replaced as the fighting platform by the horse itself. Mounted soldiers were used to screen the army, harass the enemy and pursue fleeing enemies. In the third stage, in the 4th century, the cavalry charge emerged.

== See also ==
- Corpus vasorum antiquorum
- The Knights
- The Sacred Band of Stepsons, fictional ancient cavalry
- Pentacosiomedimni, the class above, who had at least 500 medimnoi of wet or dry goods (or their equivalent) as yearly income
- Zeugitae, the class below, who were possessors of a yoke of oxen, with at least 150 medimnoi (or their equivalent) as yearly income
- Thetes, the lowest class, who were workers for wages, or had less than 150 medimnoi (or their equivalent) as yearly income
- Solon, the reformer who established the hippeis
