= Draco (legislator) =

First legislator of Athens in Ancient Greece

- Δράκων
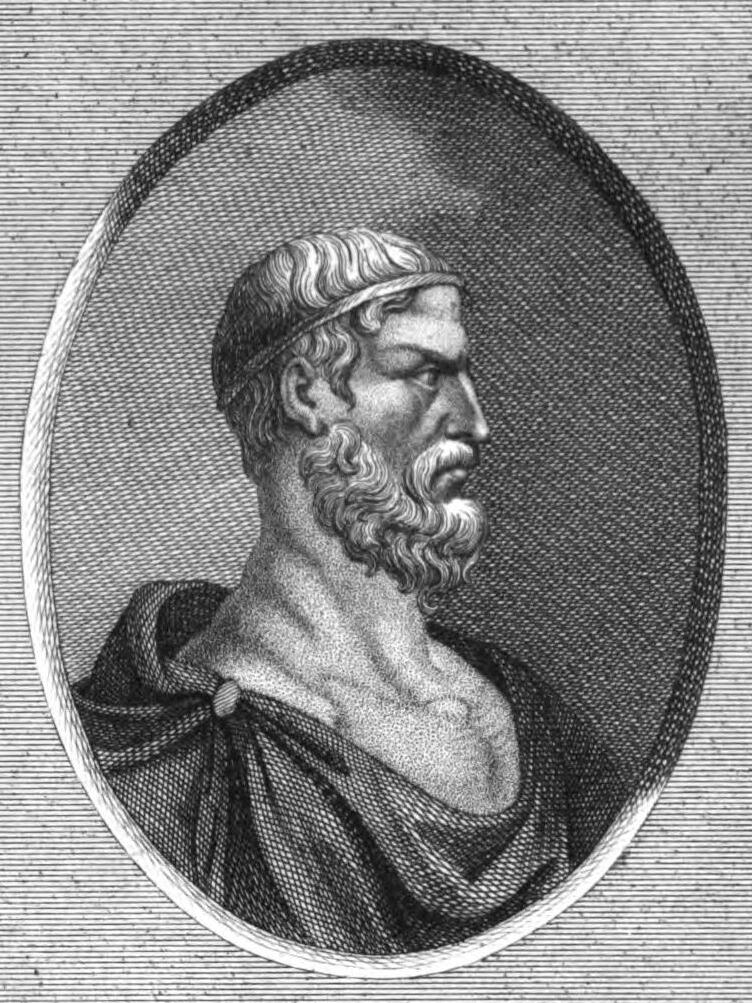
- Engraved portrait, 1833
- Born: Before 620 BC
- Died: 600 BC; Athens, Greece
- Occupation: Legislator
- Known for: Draconian constitution
- Successor: Solon

Draco (Note: /ˈdreɪkoʊ/; Ancient Greek: Δράκων, romanized: Drakōn) was the first legislator of Athens in Ancient Greece according to Athenian tradition and was active about 625 to 600 BC. He replaced the system of oral law and blood feud by the Draconian constitution, a written code to be enforced only by a court of law. His laws were supposed to have been very harsh, establishing the death penalty for most offenses. Tradition held that all of his laws were repealed by Solon, save for those on homicide. An inscription from 409/8 BC contains part of the current law and refers to it as "the law of Draco about homicide". Nothing is known about the specifics of other laws established by Draco.

According to some scholars, Draco may have been a fictional figure, entirely or in part. Biographical information about him is almost entirely lacking; he was held to have established his legal code in the year 621/620 BC. Since the 18th century, the adjective draconian (δρακόντειος, drakónteios) refers to similarly unforgiving rules or laws.

== History ==
Nothing is known about Draco's life except that he established his legal code during the reign of the archon Aristaechmus in the year 621/620 BC. The Suda, the 10th-century Byzantine encyclopedia, records a folkloric story about Draco's death: he went to Aegina to establish laws and was suffocated in the theater when his supporters honored him by throwing many hats, shirts and cloaks on him. Some scholars question whether Draco was a real historical figure or consider that he may have been partially fictional. Karl Julius Beloch hypothesized that Draco was not a person; drakon means 'serpent' in Greek, and a sacred serpent on the acropolis was worshipped in the Athenian religion. Therefore, the "laws of Draco" may have been laws issued in the name of the sacred serpent by its priests; later, this origin was forgotten and Draco was reinterpreted as a lawgiver. Raphael Sealey notes that this hypothesis helps explain how the seemingly protracted development of Athenian homicide law could be attributed to a single source. However, most scholars believe that Draco really did establish laws on homicide and other offenses, and some accept the attribution to him of the inscription partially recording the homicide law.

== Draconian constitution ==
The laws (θεσμοί – thesmoi) that he laid were the first written constitution of Athens. So that no one would be unaware of them, they were posted on wooden tablets (ἄξονες – axones), where they were preserved for almost two centuries on steles of the shape of four-sided pyramids (κύρβεις – kyrbeis). The tablets were called axones, perhaps because they could be pivoted along the pyramid's axis to read any side.

The constitution featured several major innovations:

- Instead of oral laws known to a special class, arbitrarily applied and interpreted, all laws were written, thus being made known to all literate citizens (who could appeal to the Areopagus for injustices): "the constitution formed under Draco, when the first code of laws was drawn up". (Aristotle: Athenian Constitution, Part 5, Section 41)
- The laws distinguish between murder and involuntary homicide, a novel concept at that time.

The laws were particularly harsh. For example, any debtor whose status was lower than that of his creditor was forced into slavery. The punishment was more lenient for those owing a debt to a member of a lower class. The death penalty was the punishment for even minor offences, such as stealing a cabbage. Concerning the liberal use of the death penalty in the Draconic code, Plutarch states:

It is said that Drakon himself, when asked why he had fixed the punishment of death for most offences, answered that he considered these lesser crimes to deserve it, and he had no greater punishment for more important ones.

All Draco's laws were repealed by Solon in the early 6th century BC, with the exception of the homicide law.

== Homicide law ==
After much debate, the Athenians decided to revise the laws, including the homicide law, in 409 BC. The text of the homicide law is partially preserved in a fragmentary inscription. It states that it is up to the victim's relatives to prosecute a killer.

According to the preserved part of the inscription, unintentional homicides received a sentence of exile. It is not clear whether Draco's law specified the punishment for intentional homicide. In 409 BC, intentional homicide was punished by death, but Draco's law begins: "καὶ ἐὰμ μὲ 'κ [π]ρονοί[α]ς [κ]τ[ένει τίς τινα, φεύγ]ε[ν]." Although ambiguous and difficult to translate, one suggested translation is: "Even if a man not intentionally kills another, he is exiled."

== Council of Four Hundred ==
Draco introduced the lot-chosen Council of Four Hundred, distinct from the Areopagus, which evolved in later constitutions to play a large role in Athenian democracy. Aristotle notes that Draco, while having the laws written, merely legislated for an existing unwritten Athenian constitution such as setting exact qualifications for eligibility for office.

According to Aristotle, Draco extended the franchise to all free men who could furnish themselves with a set of military equipment. However, this claim is not based on the authentic tradition, thus untrue as claimed by Welwei in 1998. They elected the Council of Four Hundred from among their number; nine archons and the treasurers were drawn from persons possessing an unencumbered property of not less than ten minas, the generals (strategoi) and commanders of cavalry (hipparchoi) from those who could show an unencumbered property of not less than a hundred minas and had children born in lawful wedlock over ten years of age. Thus, in the event of their death, their estate could pass to a competent heir. These officers were required to hold to account the prytanes (councillors), strategoi (generals) and hipparchoi (cavalry officers) of the preceding year until their accounts had been audited. "The Council of Areopagus was guardian of the laws, and kept watch over the magistrates to see that they executed their offices in accordance with the laws. Any person who felt himself wronged might lay an information before the Council of Areopagus, on declaring what law was broken by the wrong done to him. But, as has been said before, loans were secured upon the persons of the debtors, and the land was in the hands of a few."

== Legacy ==
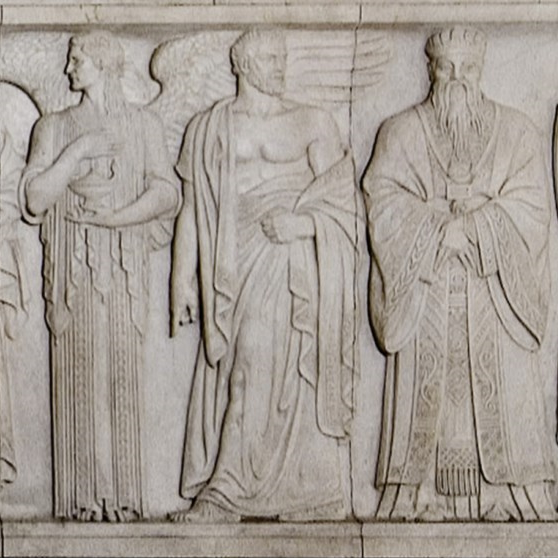
Sculpture of Draco (center) in the United States Supreme Court Building, standing between the "Light of Wisdom" (left) and Confucius

Because of his infamous legal code, Draco is the eponym of the adjective draconian (often capitalized), which describes not only excessively severe or cruel legislation, but also any such punishment or rule. With reference to legislation, the word has been used in this sense in English since 1777.

On the south frieze of the courtroom of the United States Supreme Court Building, designed by Adolph Alexander Weinman, Draco is depicted as one in a procession of the "great lawgivers of history". Owing to his controversial legacy, the inclusion of Draco in the frieze was questioned by The Atlantic.

== See also ==
- Ancient Greek law
- Hammurabi, a Babylonian who wrote some of the earliest codes of law
- Cruel and unusual punishment
- Retributive justice
- List of Ancient Greeks
- List of eponymous laws (those named after their inventor)
