= Seisachtheia =

Ancient Athenian debt-relief program by Solon

Seisachtheia (Greek: σεισάχθεια, from σείειν seiein, to shake, and ἄχθος achthos, burden, i.e. the relief of burdens) was a set of laws instituted by the Athenian lawmaker Solon (c. 638 BC–558 BC) in order to rectify the widespread serfdom and slavery that had run rampant in Athens by the 6th century BC, by debt relief.

== Debt in Athenian society ==
Under the pre-existing legal status, according to the account of the Constitution of the Athenians attributed to Aristotle, debtors unable to repay their creditors would surrender their land to them, then becoming hektemoroi, i.e. serfs who cultivated what used to be their own land and gave one sixth of produce to their creditors.

Should the debt exceed the perceived value of the debtor's total assets, then the debtor and his family would become the creditor's slaves as well. The same would result if a man defaulted on a debt whose collateral was the debtor's personal freedom.

== Seisachtheia reforms ==
The seisachtheia laws immediately cancelled all outstanding debts, retroactively emancipated all Athenian previously enslaved debtors, reinstated all confiscated serf property to the hektemoroi, and forbade the use of personal freedom as collateral in all future debts.

== How the seisachtheia worked and its controversies ==
The desire for socioeconomic balance manifested itself in legal developments that were made in pursuance of greater equality and balance between the rich and poor, whereby policies like the seisachtheia sought to strike that important balance. Nevertheless, controversies regarding the implementation of seemingly equality-achieving policies remained.

How the seisachtheia worked is the subject of academic dispute due to divisions of opinion between ancient scholars. Aristotle and Plutarch observed that the seisachtheia worked by “prohibiting all loans on the security of the debtor’s person” and achieving “disburdenment” by the “cancelling of debts”. On this understanding of seisachtheia, many debt slaves were freed and could keep the value that their purchased land carried. However, other ancient scholars, namely Androtion, reported that Solon’s seisachtheia had only reduced the value of the interest due to their reform of the currency. However, the credibility of Androtion’s view has been the subject of criticism by modern scholars, because, in contrast with the widely accepted view propounded by Aristotle in ‘The Constitution of the Athenians’, scholars have concluded that ‘the only possible reason’ for Androtion’s view for disagreeing with Aristotle’s view is due to ‘political bias’ and to advance his ‘conservative’ agenda in the face of fourth-century social revolution demanding the redistribution of land and cancellation of debts. P. Harding offers an alternative view to understanding Androtion’s observations of seisachtheia, arguing that Androtion mistakenly applied ‘fourth-century economic conditions to sixth-century affairs’ such that it required making the unrealistic assumption that Athenians understood the sophisticated practical effects of currency reform in Solon’s time. Harding also rebuts the ‘conservative agenda’ argument because, since Athenian citizens in Androtion’s time were already ‘clearly conservative’ when it came to property rights, it was pointless to misreport seisachtheia as merely currency reform to trick Athenian citizens into thinking that the conservative approach to property rights was backed by Solon’s reforms because citizens would have supported the conservative approach either way.

There is also scepticism behind Solon’s motives in enacting the seisachtheia. By discharging all debts, all debt slaves were freed from slavery. This angered the upper-class landowners, especially those of the pentakosiomedimnoi class, who had lost their slaves as a result of the seisachtheia. Since the upper classes monopolised political power in Athens, going against their will would appear to spell disaster for Solon’s political advancement. On the surface, it would seem as though the enactment of the seisachtheia was a misstep in his political career, but Solon, in his poetry, states that: “Since by the force of law I won my ends And kept my promise. Equal laws I gave To evil and to good, with even hand Drawing straight justice for the lot of each.” Aristotle’s observations reinforce Solon’s self-proclaimed goodwill, where Aristotle states that Solon “preferred instead to incur the hostility of both parties by placing his honour and the general welfare above his personal aggrandisement”. However, some, like the “partisans of the popular party” who belong to the upper class, were sceptical of Solon’s supposed moral uprightness, raising the accusation that Solon’s “friends stole a march on him” or that Solon “had a share in the fraud himself” by buying large amounts of land at a loss, and once the debt had been cancelled by seisachtheia, “they became wealthy”. Aristotle vouched for Solon’s character by arguing that, due to his “moderate and public-spirited” nature, it is only logical to conclude that these accusations are “false”. Likewise, Plutarch cited Solon’s “well-known sacrifice of five talents”, or even fifteen talents by Polyzelus the Rhodian’s account, as having “dissipated” the accusations of fraud.

However, Plutarch does recognise that Solon’s friends, namely Conon, Cleinias, and Hipponicus, became known as “chreocopidae” (or “debt-cutters”) for their fraudulent acts. P. J. Rhodes notes that modern scholars have ‘plausibly suggested’ that the story of Solon’s friends profiting from the seisachtheia was to ‘discredit those men’. There are further grounds that the accusations levied against Solon’s friends are baseless, since vast expanses of land could not be purchased in such a short period given that Solonian Athens was a society ‘in which land changed hands with difficulty and coinage was not yet used’. It is also notable that Aristotle completely omits to mention the accusations launched against Solon’s friends.

== See also ==
- Slavery in ancient Greece
- Jubilee (biblical)
