= Draconian constitution =

Law code in Ancient Greece

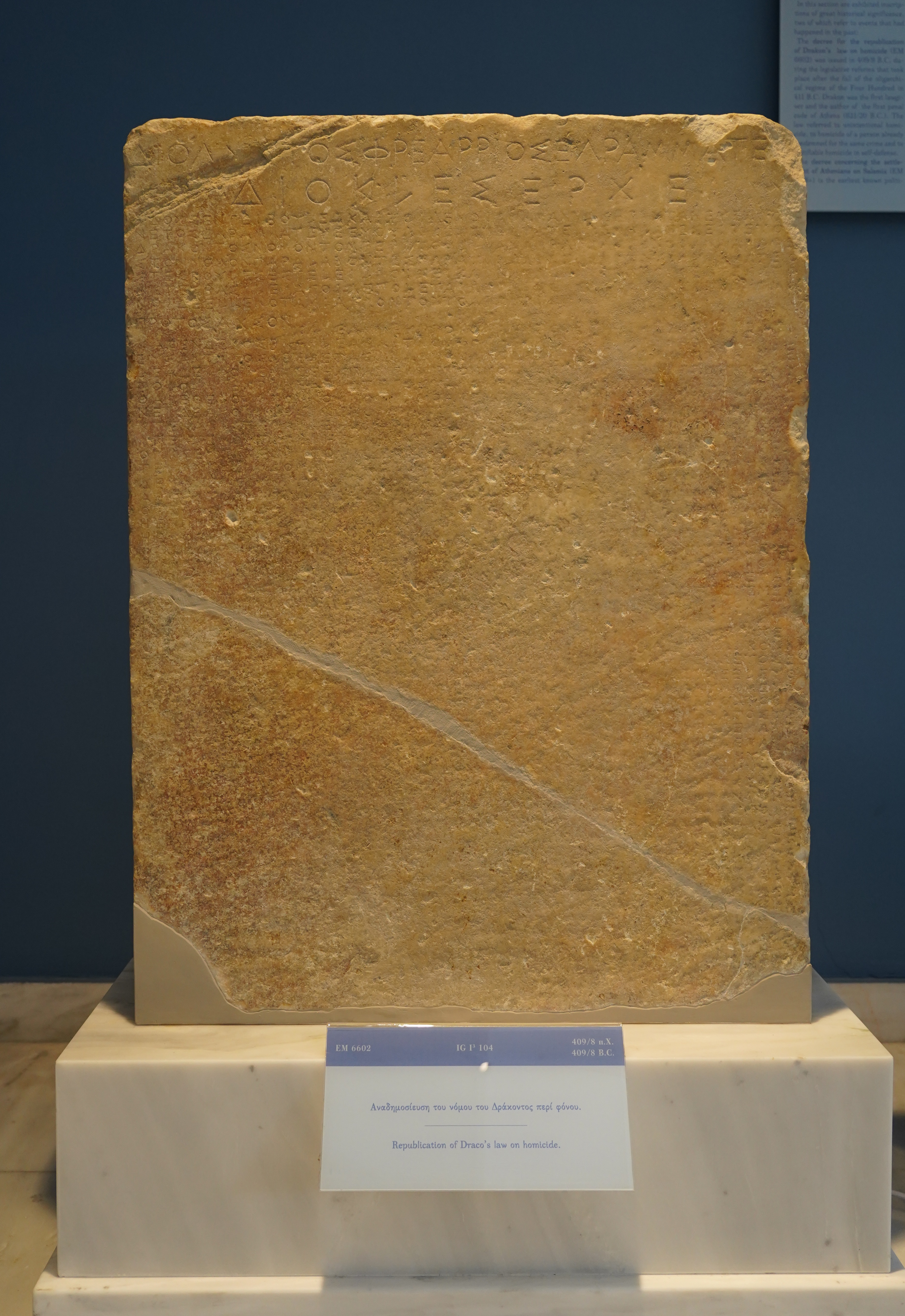
- Republication of Draco's law on homicide (408–409 BC)
- Created: c. 620 BC
- Author: Draco
- Signatories: Athenian aristocracy
- Purpose: To resolve unequal accessibility to the acquirement of legal knowledge of oral law by replacing such with a written constitution

The Draconian constitution, or Draco's code, was a written law code created by Draco in Athens around 620 BC, in response to the unjust interpretation and modification of oral law by Athenian aristocrats. In the mid-seventh century BC, Ancient Greek societies began to codify basic law; this started in Athens with the emergence of Draco's code. The people of Athens commissioned Draco to devise a written law code and constitution, giving him the title of the first legislator of Athens. The literate could read the code at a central location accessible to anyone. This enactment of a rule of law was an early precursor to Athenian democracy.

Punishments for breaking the laws were severe, often death. The term "draconian", meaning excessively severe, thus derives from Draco's name and his law code. It is often applied to laws or other government measures.

== Background ==
The need for written laws began with the unequal access to legal knowledge of the aristocracy as compared with the general populace; the established laws of Athens were inefficiently formulated in the spoken language and often modified and re-evaluated. The aristocratic exploitation of this system began during the mid-seventh century BC, and laws were often amended to benefit the aristocracy. This triggered feuds by families ignorant of the law in an attempt to obtain justice.

To minimize the incidence of these feuds, the governing aristocratic families of Athens decided to abandon their concealed system of legal proposals and amendments and promulgate them to Athenian society in writing. They authorized Draco, an aristocratic legislator, to construct the written constitution, and he began to write the text around 620 BC. To promulgate the new constitution, its text was inscribed on displaying devices. As a result, the Draconian constitution was accessible to the literate.

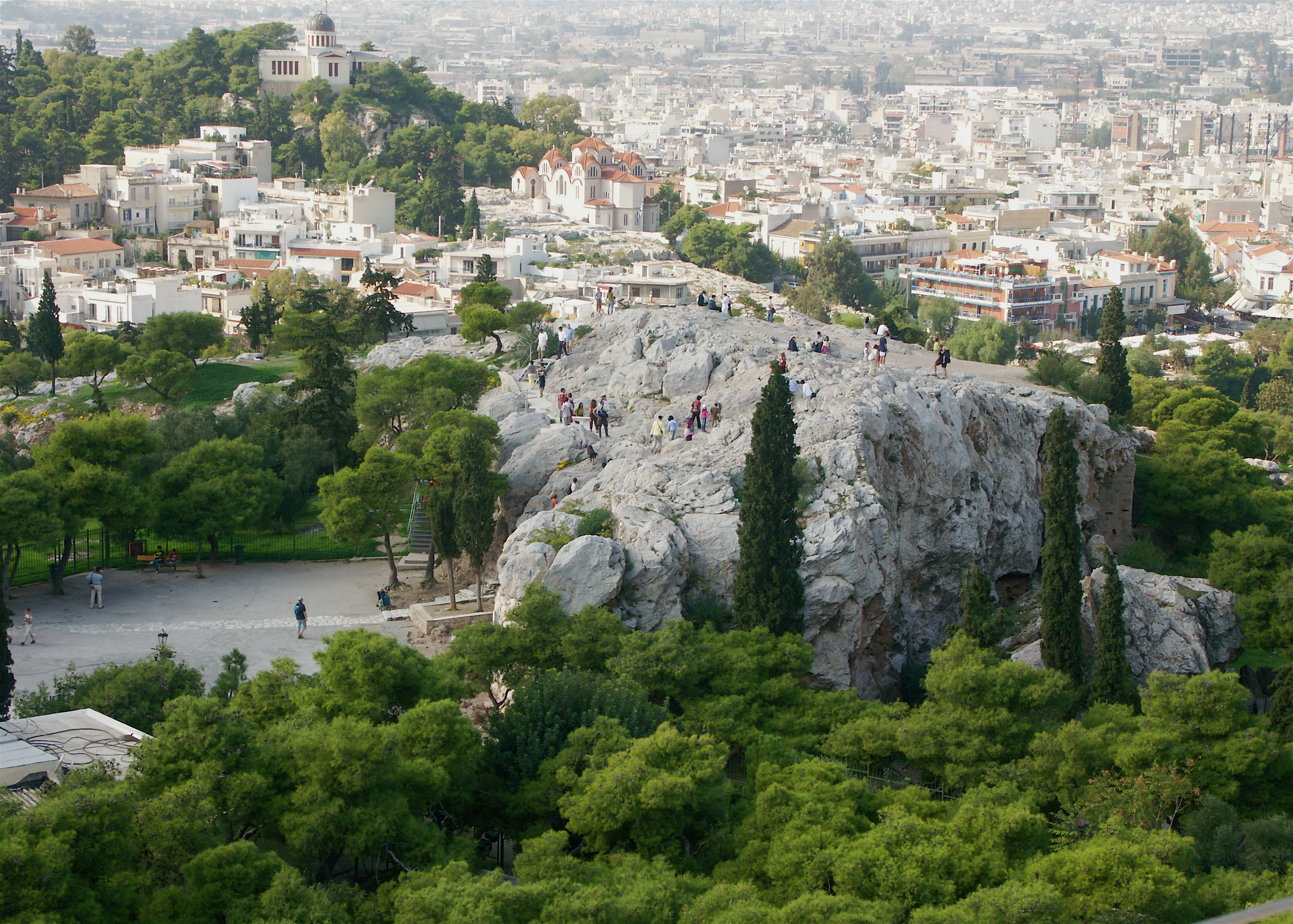
The Areopagus

Draco introduced the concepts of intentional and unintentional homicide, with both crimes adjudicated at the Areopagus. Since murder cases were tried by the state, feuds as a form of justice became illegal. The homicide laws were the only laws retained by the early-6th-century BC Solonian Constitution.

And Draco himself, they say, being asked why he made death the penalty for most offences, replied that in his opinion the lesser ones deserved it, and for the greater ones no heavier penalty could be found.

— Plutarch, Life of Solon

Although the full Draconian constitution no longer exists, severe punishments were reportedly meted out to those convicted of offenses as minor as stealing an apple. There may have been only one penalty, execution, for all convicted violators of the Draconian constitution and the laws were said to be written in blood instead of ink. These legends have become part of the English language, with the adjective "draconian" referring to unusually harsh punishment.

== Suffrage ==
Hoplites were entitled to participate in political life; they could vote and hold minor state official positions. To hold higher positions, property was required. Hoplites with debt-free property valued at ten minas or more could serve as an eponymous archon or a Treasurer. The Athenian strategoi (generals) and hipparchoi (cavalry commanders) were chosen from those holding unencumbered property worth at least 100 minas with offspring over 10 years of age who were born in wedlock. Four hundred and one Council members were chosen by lot from hoplites at least 30 years of age. No one could be elected by lot more than once to serve on the council until the Council "cast the lot afresh": again included every eligible individual for the next Council when everyone had served a turn. Election to political positions in Athens was based on sortition except for the Areopagus, which consisted of retired archons.

== Council and assembly ==
The council was another concept Draco introduced to Athenian government in his constitution. In Aristotle's Constitution of the Athenians, the council was vaguely characterized as a magistracy. The Assembly was another Athenian magistracy which was described in detail by Aristotle.

Council or Assembly members who were absent from a meeting were fined, with the fines proportionate to social class. If the absent member was from the pentacosiomedimnus class, they were fined three drachmas. Knights were fined two drachmas, and zeugites one drachma.

== In Constitution of the Athenians ==
=== Setting ===
Aristotle's timeline of the Draconian constitution is characterized by the vague phrase "not very long after":

Such, then, is the relative chronological precedence of these offices. At that time the nine Archons did not all live together. The King occupied the building now known as the Boculium, near the Prytaneum, as may be seen from the fact that even to the present day the marriage of the King's wife to Dionysus takes place there. The Archon lived in the Prytaneum, the Polemarch in the Epilyceum. The latter building was formerly called the Polemarcheum, but after Epilycus, during his term of office as Polemarch, had rebuilt it and fitted it up, it was called the Epilyceum. The Thesmothetae occupied the Thesmotheteum. In the time of Solon, however, they all came together into the Thesmotheteum. They had power to decide cases finally on their own authority, not, as now, merely to hold a preliminary hearing. Such then was the arrangement of the magistracies. The Council of Areopagus had as its constitutionally assigned duty the protection of the laws; but in point of fact it administered the greater and most important part of the government of the state, and inflicted personal punishments and fines summarily upon all who misbehaved themselves. This was the natural consequence of the facts that the Archons were elected under qualifications of birth and wealth, and that the Areopagus was composed of those who had served as Archons; for which latter reason the membership of the Areopagus is the only office which has continued to be a life-magistracy to the present day.

Such was, in outline, the first constitution, but not very long after the events above recorded, in the archonship of Aristaichmus, Draco enacted his ordinances.

— Aristotle, Constitution of the Athenians chapters 3 and 4, translated by Frederic G. Kenyon

Given the founding of Athens by Cecrops I and its first constitution in 1556 BC, its legal framework would have functioned for over 900 years before Draco codified the laws and drafted his constitution around 620 BC. Therefore, subsequently, commentators assume that the phrase "not very long after" refers instead to the more recent Cylonian affair.

=== Prytanes ===
Aristotle's undefined use of "Prytanes" refers to a number of Athenian state positions during and after the development of the Draconian constitution:

Such was, in outline, the first constitution, but not very long after the events above recorded, in the archonship of Aristaichmus, Draco enacted his ordinances. Now his constitution had the following form. The franchise was given to all who could furnish themselves with a military equipment. The nine Archons and the Treasurers were elected by this body from persons possessing an unencumbered property of not less than ten minas, the less important officials from those who could furnish themselves with a military equipment, and the generals [Strategi] and commanders of the cavalry [Hipparchi] from those who could show an unencumbered property of not less than a hundred minas, and had children born in lawful wedlock over ten years of age. These officers were required to hold to bail the Prytanes, the Strategi, and the Hipparchi of the preceding year until their accounts had been audited, taking four securities of the same class as that to which the Strategi and the Hipparchi belonged.

— Aristotle, Constitution of the Athenians chapter 4, translated by Frederic G. Kenyon

"Prytanes" later referred to the fifty members of the council, although their only other appearance in the context of the Draconian constitution was in Herodotus' account of the Cylonian affair (where the "Prytanes of Naucrari" are mentioned). This may have occurred due to Herodotus' (a Dorian) habit of referring to the first magistrates of Dorian cities as "Prytanes of Naucrari" and conflating them with the first magistrates of Athens (the Archons). Thucydides' more-detailed version also refers to Herodotus' "Prytanes of Naucrari." He wrote: "Those to whom the people had confided the keeping of the citadel, seeing the partisans of Cylon perish at the feet of the statue of Minerva, caused them to go out of the citadel, promising them that no harm would be done to them." As Thucydides had mentioned in his account of the Cylonian affair, the nine Archons were the people entrusted with the citadel.

=== Relationships among Athenian officials ===
A relationship between current officials and the Prytanes, strategoi and hipparchoi of the preceding year concerning financial securities is a controversial text in the Oxford Classical Text edition of Aristotle's Constitution of the Athenians, translated by Frederic G. Kenyon:

These officers were required to hold to bail the Prytanes, the Strategi, and the Hipparchi of the preceding year until their accounts had been audited, taking four securities of the same class as that to which the Strategi and the Hipparchi belonged.

— Aristotle, Constitution of the Athenians, chapter 4 (Kenyon translation)

=== Draco's position ===
Until the discovery of Aristotle's Constitution of the Athenians, Draco was not considered a political reformer. Although the Draconian constitution is not mentioned by contemporary historians, his position as a political and constitutional reformer and a lawgiver was emphasized by Aristotle (despite the repeal of most of his laws, except those governing homicide).
