= Medimnos =

Ancient Greek unit of volume

A medimnos (Greek: μέδιμνος, médimnos, plural μέδιμνοι, médimnoi) was an Ancient Greek unit of volume, which was generally used to measure dry food grain. (Note: In ancient Greece, measures of capacity varied depending on whether they were being used to measure solids or liquids. (G.Rachet e M.F.Rachet, Dizionario Larousse della civiltà greca, op. cit.)) In Attica, it was approximately equal to 51.84 litres, although this volume was frequently subject to regional variation. For example, the Spartan medimnos was approximately equal to 71.16 litres. A medimnos could be divided into several smaller units: the tritaios (one third), the hekteus (one sixth), the hemiektos (one twelfth), the choinix (one forty-eighth) and the kotyle (0.27 L).

== History ==
The medimnos originated in Corinth and was adopted as a unit of measurement by Classical Athens and Megara as well as various other Greek poleis.

It was the measure used by Solon to establish a Timocratic Constitution in Athens around 595 BCE. According to this constitution, various amounts of grain needed to be paid as tax to secure certain ranks or social statuses (for example, a payment of 500 medimnoi to become a military commander, but only 200 or less to become an agricultural worker). Since taxes could be paid in any of the foodstuffs common at the time (agricultural crops, wine, meat, fish etc.), it was necessary to adjust the actual volume being paid according to its relative value at the time of payment.

After the reforms introduced in the second century BCE, the medimnos was set at 58.92 liters. The smaller units of division all remained the same, with the exception of the kotyle, which was 1/238 of a medimnos.

It is difficult to ascertain how much a medimnos would have weighed. The weight of a medimnos is currently believed to be 40 kilograms of wheat, or 31 kg of barley. This difference is very significant in attempting to judge how much tribute would have been paid at the time.

It is believed that an active adult male in the sixth century BCE would have needed to consume about eight medimnoi per year (a choinix was considered the daily norm), with a typical female consuming a slightly lower amount. From these figures, it can be estimated that a young family including a father, a mother and three children would have consumed approximately 25 medimnoi every year. The payment required to receive a very high rank, therefore, would feed approximately 20 families.

== Ancient sources ==
According to Herodotus, during the reign of Xerxes II of Persia, the Satrap of Assyria (Tritantaechmes, son of Artabazos I of Phrygia) received an income of just over one medimnos of silver every day. This was equivalent to approximately 55 litres.

According to Polybius, in the Roman army at the time of the Punic Wars “the infantrymen receive two thirds of an Attic medimnos of wheat every month; the cavalry receive seven medimnoi of barley and two of wheat. In the allies' army, the infantry receive the same, while the cavalry receive one and a medimnos and a third of wheat and five medimnoi of barley”.

The historian, Josephus, mentions that during the 13th year of Herod the Great's reign, the country had suffered from a prolonged drought, and the ground was barren and unable to produce fruit on that account. He then petitioned the man who had been made prefect of Egypt by Caesar, who allowed Herod's countrymen to purchase grain and to export it, insofar that "the number of cori of wheat, of ten Attic medimnos apiece, that were given to foreigners, amounted to ten thousand; and the number that was given in his own kingdom was eighty thousand."

Epiphanius of Salamis has, likewise, mentioned the medimnos, saying: "The m^{e}nasis and the medimnos are taken, I think, from the language of the Romans, for in that language medium is interpreted 'middle.' ...But the medimnos varies among the Cyprians; for the people of Salamis, that is to say, of Constantia, have a medimnos of 5 modii, while those of Paphos and the Sicilians measure it as 4½ modii."
