= Dikasterion =

System of citizen jury courts in Classical Athens

The dikasterion, dicasterion or dicasterium (Ancient Greek: δικαστήριον, romanized: dikastērion) was the system of popular jury courts in Classical Athens during the 5th and 4th centuries BCE. Alongside the Assembly (ekklesia) and the Council of 500 (boule), it formed one of the three central pillars of Athenian democracy. The dikastēria heard the vast majority of private suits (dikai) and public prosecutions (graphai)—excluding homicide. The term Heliaia, properly the name of the largest court venue (whose location remains unknown), came to be used by some ancient sources as a synonym for the system as a whole. Modern English-language scholarship predominantly uses dikasterion for the institutional system.

The courts operated without professional judges, prosecutors, or lawyers. Instead, legal functions were done by panels of ordinary citizens known as dikastai, chosen by lot from an annual pool of 6,000 males aged thirty or over. Juries were large, numbering 201, 401, or 501 men, and reaching up to 1,500 or more for major political trials. From the mid-5th century BCE, jurors received a daily wage (dikastikon), a reform intended to ensure that poorer citizens could afford to take part.

A defining characteristic of the dikasterion was that it was not a deliberative body; unlike modern juries, jurors were prohibited from discussing the case among themselves. After hearing strictly timed speeches from the litigants, they immediately cast their verdicts by secret ballot with no possibility of appeal.

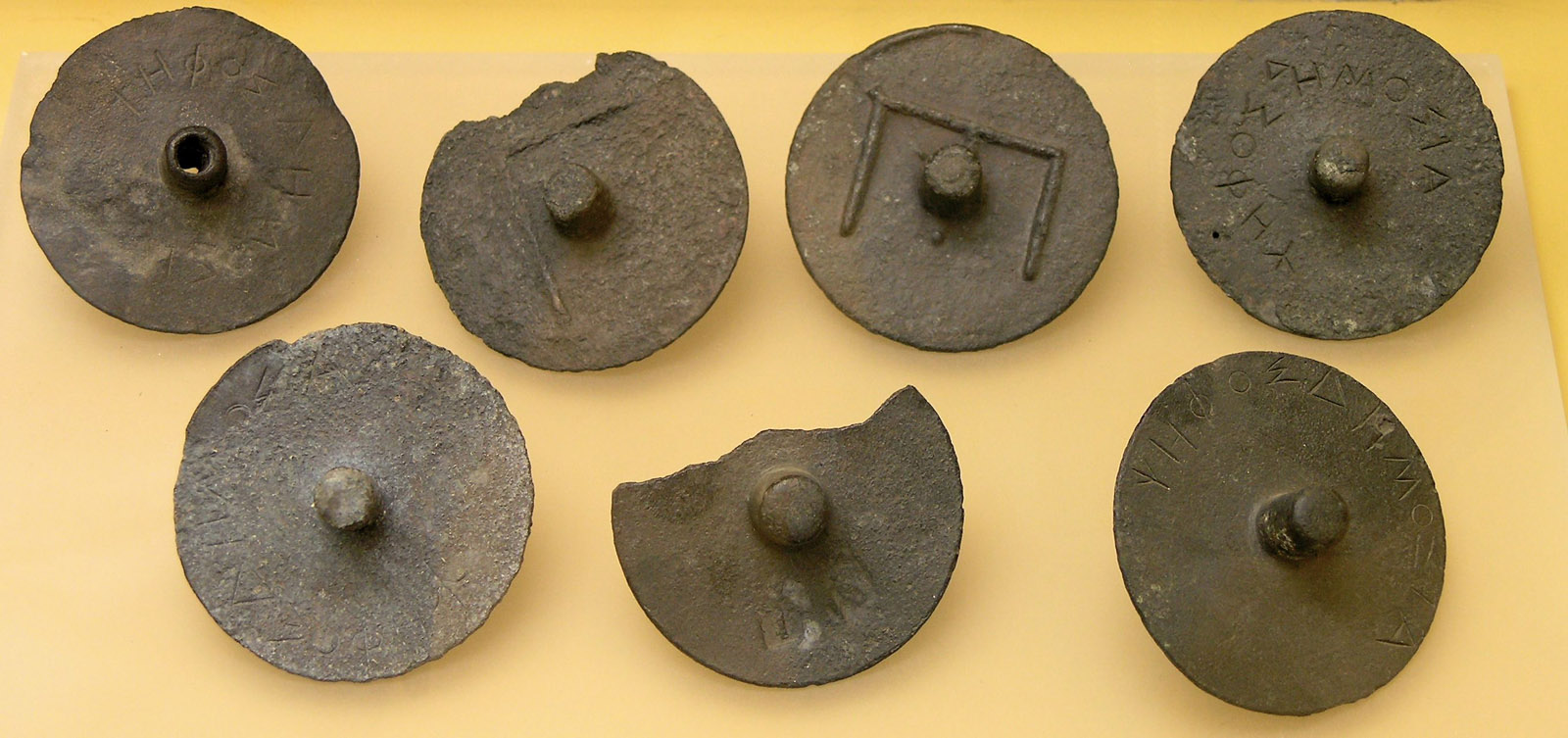
Bronze psephoi from the Ancient Agora of Athens. The hollow-pegged ballot (top) was for conviction, while the solid-pegged one (bottom) was for acquittal, c. 300 BCE. Ancient Agora Museum in Athens.

Beyond resolving legal disputes, the dikasteria exercised a form of constitutional oversight. Through procedures such as the graphe paranomon (indictment for illegal proposals) and the euthyna (audit of officials), the courts could annul decrees passed by the Assembly and hold magistrates accountable for misconduct.

== Courts and citizenship ==
Aristotle in Politics details that citizenship in ancient democracies was tied to voting in courts whose majority vote decided justice:

one factor of liberty is to govern and be governed in turn; for the popular principle of justice is to have equality according to number … the decision of the majority must be final and must constitute justice … whatever is decided by the majority is sovereign.

In his discussion of citizenship, Aristotle noted that in democracies, a citizen was distinguished by the right to participate in both the Assembly and the courts, reflecting the democratic principle that citizens should share in deliberation and judgment. His Constitution of Athens notes that:

the people has made itself master of everything, and administers everything by decrees and by jury courts in which the people is the ruling power.

Such court votes held political importance, as unlike modern courts, the dikasteria were not only legal bodies. Through procedures such as the graphe paranomon (prosecution for unconstitutional proposals), citizens could challenge Assembly laws and decrees before the courts. This procedure allowed courts to annul decrees and penalize proposers, a role some scholars compare to constitutional review. As Christopher Carey notes:

Since the courts could reverse decisions of the Assembly, through the operation of graphe paranomon, and (in the fourth century) through the graphe nomon me epitedeion theinai, it could be (and has been) maintained that the courts were the supreme authority in the state; and in fact this claim is sometimes made by speakers addressing the courts.

Such action depended entirely on ordinary citizens as there were no professional judges, prosecutors, or advocates. This made the law courts central to civic participation in ancient Greek democracy.

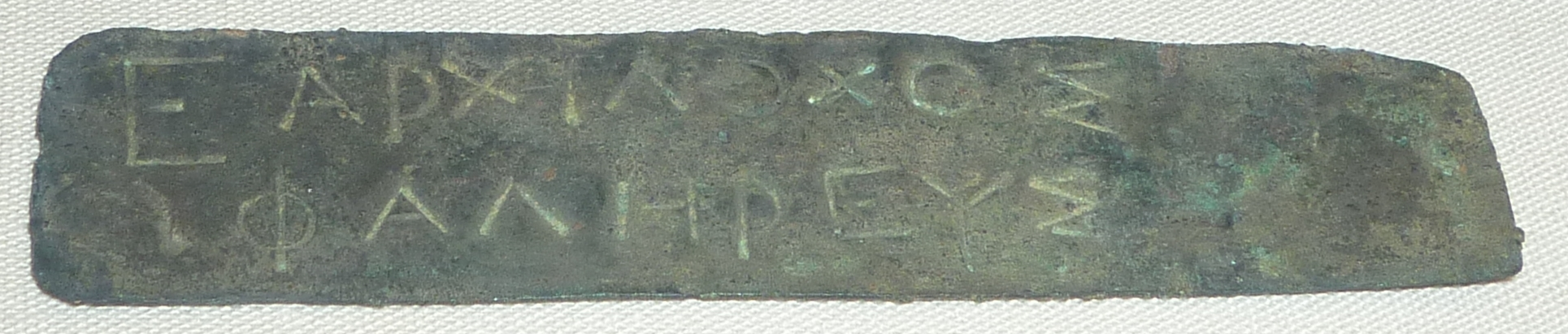
A bronze jury pinakion from about 370–362 BCE, reused after 350 BCE, held in the British Museum.

== Jurors (dikastes) ==
=== Numbers ===
Each year, 6,000 men were chosen by lot to form the pool of potential jurors who might turn up and be jurors on days when courts were in session. On a court day, multiple courts might sit. For private suits involving less than 1,000 drachmas, juries numbered 201; for larger amounts, 401 jurors were used. Public prosecutions had juries of 501. Important political trials, particularly graphe paranomon (prosecution for illegal proposals) and eisangelia (impeachment) cases, could have combined juries of 1,001, 1,501, 2,001 or even 2,501 citizens.

=== Selection ===
Jury service was open to all male citizens aged thirty or over who had not lost their civic rights through atimia (a form of legal dishonor that could result from various offenses including debt to the state or failure to fulfill military obligations).

Before serving in the pool of jurors, they swore the Heliastic Oath, promising to judge according to the laws and decrees of the Assembly and Council, or, where no law existed, according to their own sense of justice. Many jurors travelled to the city, and the opportunity for paid service encouraged participation by citizens of all social classes.

Each juror received a personal identification plaque (pinakion) and was assigned to one of ten sections of 600 men, corresponding to the ten Athenian tribes. Daily court assignments were determined by a system of lotteries to prevent bribery and manipulation. On any given day, several thousand citizens could be serving as jurors across multiple courts.

Contemporary sources, particularly Old Comedy such as Aristophanes' Wasps, often depict jurors as older and poorer citizens, but surviving plaques shows broad participation from across Attica, including rural and coastal demes as noted by Mogens Herman Hansen.

In many cases the plaques are so well preserved that we can read the deme-names of the successive holders; and, astonishingly, it turns out that people from the coastal demes (paralia) and the inland demes (mesogeios) actually prevail over people from the city demes (asty).

=== Payment ===
Payment for jury service (dikastikon) was introduced under Perikles in the mid-fifth century BCE, to enable poor citizens to serve. Initially two obols per day, the rate was later increased to three obols (half a drachma). The pay was modest compared to an ordinary day's wage but provided income for the elderly or unemployed.

… who among intelligent men can fail to be chagrined at what goes on, when we see many of our fellow-citizens drawing lots in front of the law-courts to determine whether they themselves shall have the necessaries of life.

The state's annual expenditure on jury pay was considerable but remained small compared to military costs.

The annual cost to the state of jury pay must have been between 22 and 37 talents; one cannot be more precise, but that is enough to give an idea of its significance in the Athenian budget. The courts cost more than the Council but less than the Assembly, and the whole jury pay for a year was only a fraction of the cost of a single campaign of a few months.

Even in periods of financial strain, jury pay was viewed as a cornerstone of democratic equality.

== Personnel and public access ==
Beyond the jurors themselves, the operation of the dikasteria required various magistrates and administrative personnel.

=== Magistrates ===
The administration of the courts was the duty of the thesmothetai (six junior magistrates) while the daily allotment of juries was controlled by the nine archons plus the secretary of the thesmothetai.

Receiving charges and presiding over the courts depended on legal area. Family and inheritance came under the archons, homicide and sacrilege under the King archon; issues involving metics and other non-Athenians under the Polemarch; political trials under the six thesmothetai; most private suits to the Forty (a board of four from each tribe); and military law under the strategoi.

=== No public prosecutor ===
There was no public prosecutor—all actions were initiated and pursued by private citizens:

At Athens in classical times there was no public prosecutor: the system was "accusatorial", i.e. based on accusations by private individuals. The political leader Lykourgos openly states that illegalities would go unpunished unless some citizen took it upon himself to bring a case: "without an accuser the laws and the courts are worth nothing". Such an "accusatorial" system could only function because an astoundingly large number of citizens took an active part in the law, not only as jurors but also as prosecutors or plaintiffs.

=== No lawyers ===
Paid representatives in court were illegal.

a singular feature of the Athenian courts is the complete absence from their working of professionals or experts. It arose, doubtless, from the wish to make the administration of justice democratic: if all citizens were to be able to take part, the whole legal system must be designed to be run by amateurs, and, if all citizens were in principle to have equal influence, it was necessary to inhibit the growth of a professional corps of advocates or magistrates, since if some are amateurs and others professionals the professionals will always get the upper hand and your democracy will turn into an oligarchy.

However, people could pay speech writers known as logographers to prepare what to say in court. Many of these speeches survive such as those written by Antiphon, Lysias, Isaeus, Demosthenes, Dinarchus and Hyperides and provide details about the running of the dikasterion. People could also be represented in court by unpaid friends called synegoros.

=== Randomly assigned tasks ===
Jurors did not only sit in judgment. Ten of them were randomly assigned before the court started to aid its working.

within each court a final selection by lot took place, to choose one juror to control the water-clock, four to carry out the counting of votes, and five to carry out the payment of the jurors when the day’s business was over.

=== Public ===
Proceedings were open to the public as spectators as noted in comedies such as Aristophanes' Acharnians. However, for cases involving the Mysteries, a rope barrier set at a distance of fifty feet kept the uninitiated from hearing their secrets.

== Court workings ==
=== Locations ===
The Athenian court system was extensive. The largest and most famous was the Heliaia, though many other courts handled specialized types of cases. The location of the Heliaia remains unknown, but most courts were near the Athenian Agora.

=== Court schedule ===
Based on surviving evidence about festival calendars and assembly meetings (on which courts did not sit), scholars estimate they met approximately 175–225 days per year. Several could occur simultaneously.

Court days were fixed to the length of the shortest day of the year (about 9.5 hours) to ensure fair treatment regardless of season. For public prosecutions, this was divided into three equal parts: three hours for the prosecution, three for the defense, and three for administrative matters including jury selection, voting, and, if needed, penalty determination.

Private suits had time limits based on the amount in dispute, with the shortest cases taking less than an hour and the longest about two hours. A panel of 401 jurors could hear and judge about four private suits in a day.

=== No deliberation ===
Unlike modern juries, which reach verdicts after shared deliberation such discussion was banned (though jurors reacted to speakers). As explained by Daniela Cammack:

in striking contrast to modern jury practice, there was no formal opportunity for group discussion after the presentation of the case. This seems to have been standard practice across ancient Greece. Aristotle remarks that unlike arbitrators, who worked in small groups and were expected to discuss cases with one another, judges in most communities were prohibited from “speaking together” (koinologeomai, a term that also means “come to an agreement”). Judges thus arrived at their verdicts more or less by themselves: no doubt informed by the reactions of other judges while the speeches were progressing, but without being accountable to anyone else, without any pressure to justify their reasoning to others or to agree with others in their assessment of the case, and indeed without engaging with anyone at all during the trial unless they wished to do so. They simply made up their minds, rather quickly, which way to vote, and voted.

=== Secret ballot ===
Aristotle notes the importance of the secret ballot to the jury courts. Alan Boegehold explains why:

Lysias and his hearers understood the danger of immediate, desperate reprisals that can follow open voting. He recalls, in his speech against Agoratos, how the Thirty, by forcing citizens to vote openly, secured the verdicts they wanted. But there are other reprisals. Disapproval by friends, the loss of a favor that was hoped for, fear of these too influenced a man's vote, and it is against these influences and more that the secret ballot protects the voter. Voting is a radical idea, and especially secret voting.

== Legal proceedings ==
=== Amount of litigation ===
Extensive court litigation was recognized by foreigners and comedy writers as playing a central role in Athenian life. Adriaan Lanni details this:

there was a great deal of litigation in Athens. The courts were in session about 200 days a year, and could hear anywhere from four to upward of 40 cases in a day, depending on the type of case. Thucydides tells us that foreigners called the Athenians philodikoi (“lovers of litigation”), and Athenian litigiousness is a common joke in Aristophanes’ comedies. One character jokes that Athenians are only good for serving as jurors, and another looks at a map of Greece and does not recognize Athens because there are no sitting jurors visible. The high frequency of Athenian litigation provides the premise for two of Aristophanes’ plays: the characters in the Birds establish a new city in the sky to avoid the excessive litigation of Athens; and the protagonist of the Wasps is an old man addicted to serving jury service.

=== Types of cases ===
Legal actions fell into private and public prosecutions:

- Private suits (dikai), brought only by the injured party and usually resolved by payment of damages.
- Public prosecutions (graphai), initiated by any citizen and concerned offenses against the state. This included those not in a position to bring a case themselves such as orphans. These had to be against a specific individual. If several were involved, they had to be tried separately. These prosecutions could result in fines, loss of rights, exile, or death.

Homicide cases were tried in separate, older tribunals such as the Areopagus, but most other disputes—from property claims to political offenses—came before the dikasteria.

=== Stages ===
Legal proceedings had the following stages:

=== Initiating a case ===
- Summons (prosklesis): The plaintiff/accuser summoned the defendant personally before two witnesses (kleteres). This constituted a formal invitation to appear before the relevant magistrate on an agreed day.
- Written charges: On the appointed day, the plaintiff submitted a written charge (graphe) to the magistrate, and the defendant provided a written reply (antigraphe). The magistrate could reject charges outside his jurisdiction, improperly formatted, or not recognized by law.
- Court fees: For most private suits, both parties paid court fees called prytaneia (3 drachmas for minor cases, 30 for major ones), which were reimbursed to the winner by the loser. Public prosecutions required a different fee called parastasis.
- Formal objection option: Defendants could file a paragraphe (counter-indictment) claiming the case was inadmissible, which had to be decided by a court before the main case could proceed.
- Publication: The magistrate published the charges at the Monument to the Eponymous Heroes in the Agora.

=== Preliminary hearing ===
- Anakrisis: For public prosecutions, a magistrate conducted this preliminary investigation. For most private suits, an arbitrator (diaitetes) was appointed.
- Arbitration: Arbitrators were citizens in their 60th year (the final year of military liability). They were organized by tribe, with cases assigned by lot. The arbitrator's first priority was settlement; failing that, he issued an award. If either party rejected the award, they could appeal to court. Evidence was collected in sealed containers (echinoi) for court use.

=== Jury selection ===
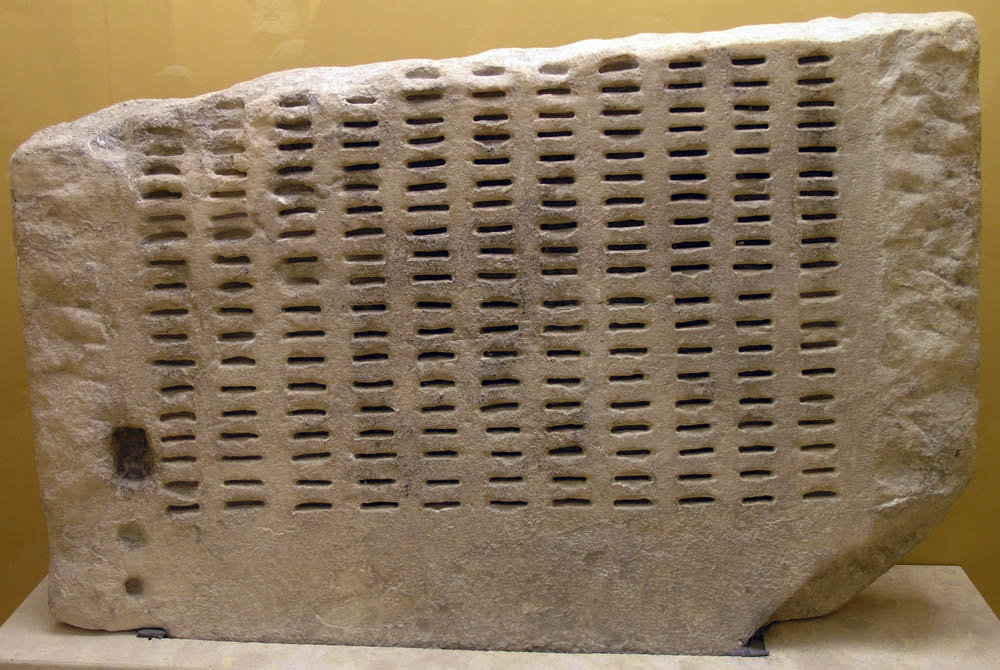
A kleroterion in the Ancient Agora Museum (Athens)

By the end of the fourth century BCE, jury selection had become an elaborate process designed to prevent bribery and corruption:

1. Initial reporting: Potential jurors arrived at dawn and organized by tribe at ten entrance gates to the court complex. Each juror deposited his identification plaque in the appropriate chest according to its letter designation (alpha through kappa).
2. First lottery: At each gate, an archon drew one plaque from each of the ten chests. These ten citizens, in addition to serving as jurors, also then supervised the following allotment using a randomization device called a kleroterion.
3. Section selection: White and black balls were placed in the kleroterion; as the balls were released, whole rows of jurors were either selected (white) or rejected (black) to provide the number of jurors needed for that day.
4. Court assignment: Selected jurors next drew painted acorns marked with letters corresponding to different courts. Their identification plaques were placed in chests with matching letters.
5. Entry tokens: Each juror received a staff matching the color of their assigned court's entrance, which at the courtroom door, they exchanged for another token.
6. Magistrate assignment: A separate lottery determined which magistrate would preside over each court.
7. Court officials selection: A final selection by lot within each court chose one juror to control the water-clock, four to count votes, and five to handle juror payment.

=== Court session ===
- Opening: The session began with the reading of the written charge and the defendant's reply.
- Oath of relevance: Both parties swore to confine their arguments to matters relevant to the case.
- Timed speeches: The water-clock (klepsydra) timed speeches, with the plaintiff/prosecutor speaking first, followed by the defendant. Documents read by the court clerk did not count against speaking time.
- Questioning: Speakers could directly question their opponents, who were obliged to answer.
- Witness challenges: After speeches, parties could announce if they wished to challenge any witness testimony as false.

=== Voting and verdict ===
- No deliberation: Jurors were prohibited from discussing the case among themselves.
- Ballot distribution: Each juror received two bronze voting disks with axles—one hollow (for the plaintiff) and one solid (for the defendant).
- Secret ballot: Jurors filed past two urns, casting their vote disk in an bronze urn and the unused disk in an wooden urn. The ballot was designed to stop observation of how individuals voted.
- Counting: Votes were counted on a special board with holes for the axles, and a herald announced the result.
- Tie votes: If votes were equal, the defendant was acquitted.
- Penalties for unsuccessful prosecution: In public prosecutions, accusers who failed to receive one-fifth of the votes were fined 1,000 drachmas and lost the right to bring similar cases. In some private suits, unsuccessful plaintiffs paid epobelia, a fine of one-sixth of the amount claimed.
- Penalty phase: For cases where the penalty wasn't fixed by law (agones timetoi), a second hearing followed in which both sides proposed penalties and jurors had to choose between them.
- Payment: After the final vote, jurors received their three-obol pay using their tokens.

=== Evidence and standards of proof ===
Athenian trials relied on rhetorical persuasion. Litigants were expected to combine factual arguments with appeals to character and civic values. Evidence included witness statements, contracts, public decrees, and occasionally testimony obtained from enslaved people under torture (basanos). Precedent played no role; each jury was expected to decide independently according to the law and its sense of justice as noted by Mogens Herman Hansen:

It is important that precedent in any formal sense is never adduced as one of the pisteis atechnoi and hardly ever referred to in argument: the Athenians held that the right and power to judge a case rested with the jurors for that case, and they were not to be bound by what others, on another day, might have done.

However, consistency with previous verdicts might have been important has suggested by Adriaan Lanni:

The Athenians had no notion of binding precedent, and in fact the absence of review of verdicts or accountability of jurors made it impossible to enforce any criteria of judgment on the jury. Nevertheless, speakers cite previous decisions in roughly one-fifth of our surviving speeches. Litigants also often state that the verdict in the instant case will deter or encourage particular types of criminals in the future, an argument that assumes that at least some value was placed on consistency across cases.

== Political, constitutional and administrative roles ==
Beyond resolving disputes, the dikasteria served as a mechanism of political accountability in Athens. They supervised magistrates, reviewed decrees, and could punish citizens for misconduct in office. Several key procedures illustrate this role

=== Indictment for illegal proposals ===
The graphe paranomon (indictment against illegal proposals) allowed any citizen to prosecute another for introducing a decree in the Assembly that violated existing laws or harmed the public interest. A successful prosecution annulled the decree and penalized the proposer, who could lose political rights after repeated convictions. This procedure effectively enabled the courts to review and overturn decisions of the Assembly, functioning as a kind of popular constitutional court.

Many celebrated political trials, such as Aeschines’ case against Ctesiphon over the crown for Demosthenes, were graphe paranomon.

=== Eisangelia ===
Eisangelia (denunciation) addressed serious political crimes such as treason, bribery, and attempts to overthrow the democracy. Any citizen could denounce an offender to the Assembly, which decided whether to refer the case to the court. Trials were often held before exceptionally large juries, and penalties could include death or lifelong loss of civic rights. Generals and politicians were frequent targets of eisangelia prosecutions, reflecting both the high accountability and the volatile nature of Athenian public life.

=== Control of magistrates ===
The courts also controlled magistrates through a comprehensive system of pre-service examination (dokimasia), monitoring during office, and end-of-term audit (euthynai).

- During the dokimasia, candidates had to prove citizenship, proper conduct toward parents, and completion of military service; any citizen could object to their appointment.
- While in office, officials were subject to periodic votes of confidence in the Assembly and could be suspended and tried for misconduct.
- At the end of their term, every official who handled public funds faced an audit before a jury. Citizens could file complaints about any aspect of an official's behavior. Convictions for corruption or embezzlement required ten-fold payment of the sums involved.

Robert Sinclair explains the process:

In the 320s this examination (euthynai) involved both the submission of financial accounts to ten auditors (logistai) and ten advocates (synegoroi) appointed by lot from the whole citizen body and a public hearing before examiners (euthynoi) when any citizen was able to lay a complaint. Failure to render proper accounts resulted in prosecution before a Dikasterion, while complaints which seemed to the euthynoi to be well founded were referred to the deme judges in private suits and to a Dikasterion (via the thesmothetai—statute-setters) in public suits.

=== Administrative responsibilities ===
The court had administrative functions not found in modern courts, as noted by Hansen

When public works were put out to auction, the auction took place in the presence of a panel of jurors, who confirmed and witnessed the contract; when confiscated property was sold at public auction by the Eleven, that, too, had to take place before a panel of jurors; and, when a fleet was commissioned, a court had to deal with all the objections (skepseis and antidoseis) put up by the people selected for the trierarchy.

== History ==
=== Development of jury selection ===
The methods for selecting jurors changed over time:

- Fifth century: Each of the ten sections of 600 dikastes was allocated to a dikasterion for an entire year. This system allowed the identity of judges to be known in advance, creating opportunities for bribery and intimidation.
- c. 403 BCE: Following the restoration of democracy after the Thirty Tyrants, daily lottery selection was introduced, so that jurors learned their court assignment only on the morning of the trial.
- 378/377 BCE: The system was further reorganised into the elaborate three-stage lottery described in the Constitution of Athens (63ff.): first, a lottery determined which dikastes would serve that day; second, a lottery assigned each to a specific court; third, a lottery determined which magistrates would preside over each court.

== Famous trials ==
- Trial of Socrates (399 BCE): The philosopher was prosecuted for asebeia (impiety) by Meletus, Anytus, and Lycon. The jury of 501 (some sources say 500) convicted him by a margin reported as 280 to 220, and subsequently voted for the death penalty.
- Aeschines' prosecution of Ctesiphon (330 BCE): A graphe paranomon challenging the decree to crown Demosthenes. The case, heard before a large panel, resulted in Aeschines' defeat; failing to obtain one-fifth of the votes, he was fined and subsequently left Athens.
- Trials in the circle of Pericles: According to Plutarch, Pericles himself faced prosecution twice, and several associates — including Anaxagoras, Phidias, and Aspasia — were tried on various charges in the period before and during the Peloponnesian War.

== Comparison with modern courts ==
The Athenian dikasteria differed from modern courts:

- Amateur participation: All legal functions were done by ordinary citizens rather than professionals. There were no judges; jurors interpreted the law themselves.
- Jury size: Panels of several hundred men made bribery and intimidation difficult and directly expressed the collective judgment of the demos.
- Finality of verdicts: There were no appeals. The large jury size was viewed as sufficient safeguard against error.
- Political role: The courts acted as a means of direct democracy, exercising constitutional oversight and political control rather than maintaining strict separation of powers.
- Citizen prosecution: There were no public prosecutors; all cases were brought by private citizens, which encouraged civic participation but also abuse through frivolous or malicious prosecutions (sycophancy).
- Administrative duties: The courts handled many tasks now done by bureaucracies, including public contracts, property sales, and financial audits.

== See also ==
- Athenian democracy
- Areopagus
- Ancient Greek law
- Graphe paranomon
