= Ephialtes =

5th-century BCE Athenian statesman and general

Ephialtes (Ancient Greek: Ἐφιάλτης, Ephialtēs) was an ancient Athenian politician and an early leader of the democratic movement there. In the late 460s BC, he oversaw reforms that diminished the power of the Areopagus, a traditional bastion of conservatism, and which are considered by many modern historians to mark the beginning of the radical democracy for which Athens would become famous. These powers included the scrutiny and control of office holders, and the judicial functions in state trials. He reduced the property qualifications for holding a public office, and created a new definition of citizenship. In 461 BCE, he was assassinated. Although it remains uncertain who exactly killed him, it is believed to likely be at the instigation of his oligarch opponents. In the wake of his death, the political leadership of Athens passed to his deputy, Pericles.

== Early life and career ==
The first mention we get of Ephialtes' ancestry is in Diodorus Library (11.77) when he presents Ephialtes as the son of Sophonides. We are only told who his father is, and we do not have much information about him besides his name. Ephialtes first appears in the historical record as the strategos commanding an Athenian fleet in the Aegean Sea in 465 BC. Then, in 464 BC, an earthquake hit Sparta, causing a great deal of damage and indirectly resulting in the revolt of the helots. When the Spartans failed to remove the rebel helots from their base on Mount Ithome, in Messenia, they called for help from cities that were still part of the Hellenic League, an alliance formed in 481 BC against the Persians. This spurred much debate among the Athenians as to how to respond. In August 463 BC, Ephialtes represented those who wished to refuse Sparta's request for military assistance. Ephialtes argued that Sparta and Athens were natural rivals, and that Athens should rejoice at Sparta's misfortune — "let Sparta's pride be trampled underfoot." On the pro-Spartan side, Cimon, the most influential Athenian politician and general of the time, advocated that Athenians "ought not to suffer Greece to be lamed, nor their own city to be deprived of her yoke-fellow." Cimon was victorious in the debate, and set out for Sparta with 4,000 hoplites. However, shortly after the Athenians arrived to help the Spartans, their assistance was turned down. Subsequently, harmony between Sparta and Athens was broken and Cimon was ostracized for his misjudgment. The end of Cimon's ascendancy resulted in the emergence of a more radical democratic movement led by Ephialtes.

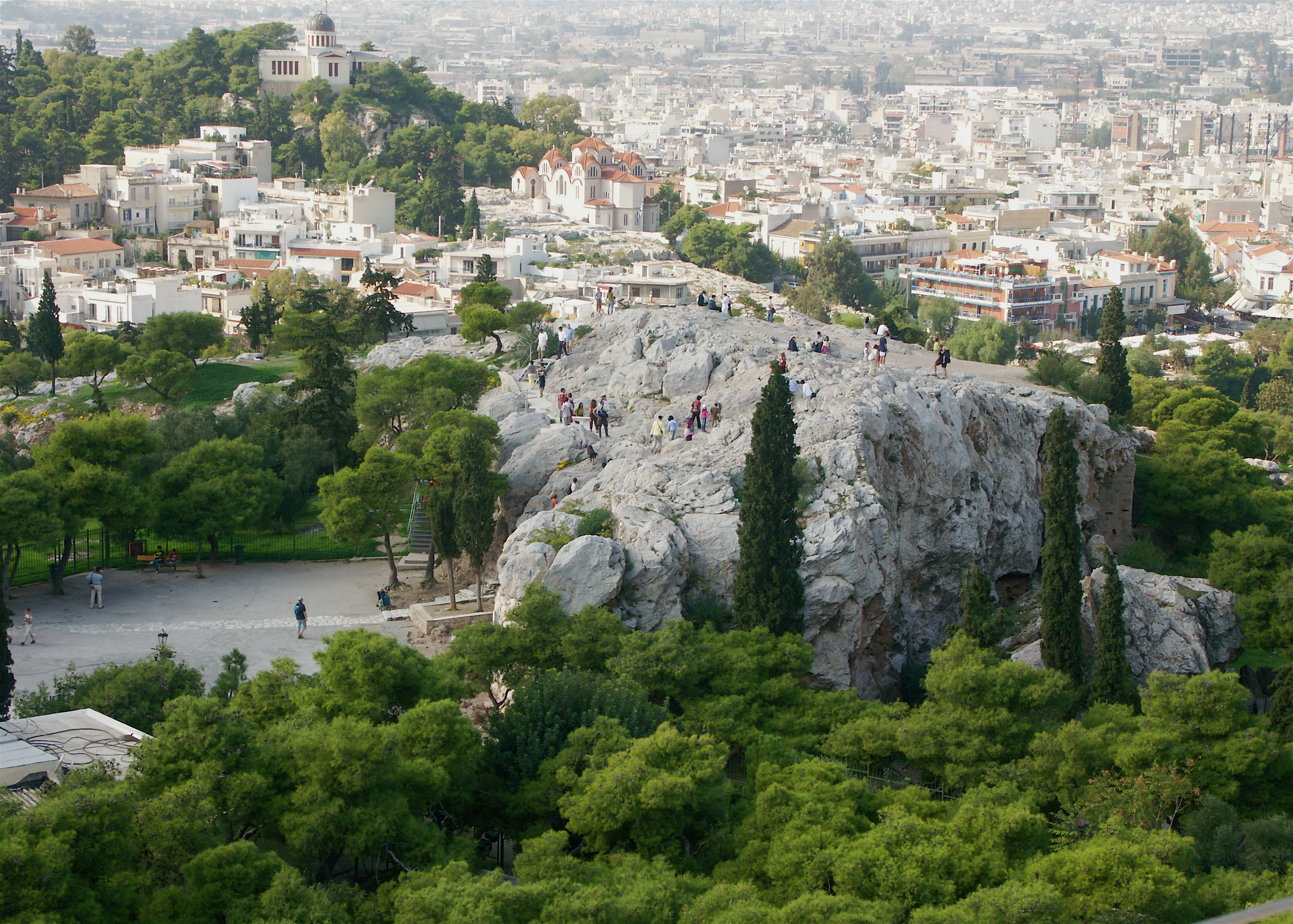
Areopagus from the Acropolis (Athens). The Council would meet on the stone hill in which it was named after.

== Reforms of the Areopagus ==
In about 461 BCE, Ephialtes and his political allies began attacking the Areopagus, a council composed of former archons which was a traditionally conservative force. According to Aristotle and some modern historians, Athens had, since about 470 BC, been governed under an informal "Areopagite constitution", under the leadership of Cimon. The motives of Ephialtes to pass these reforms are debated amongst scholars. By 486 BCE, the Areopagus had transitioned from a council of elected archons to those who were selected by a lottery system. Some scholars argue Ephialtes powers passed reforms to reflect the change in selection because they were no longer distinguished individuals. On the other hand, T.E. Rihll theorizes that Ephialtes transferred the powers of the dokimasia and the euthynai of magistrates to the boule, ekklessia, and dikasteria because the Areopagus had failed to carry out its responsibilities to criticize and question the actions of magistrates due to mismanagement or incompetence.

Ephialtes accelerated this process by prosecuting certain members for maladministration. Having thus weakened the prestige of the council, Ephialtes proposed and had passed in the popular assembly, a sweeping series of reforms which divided up the powers traditionally wielded by the Areopagus among the democratic council of the Boule, the ekklesia itself, and the popular courts. Ephialtes took away from the Areopagus its "added powers which made it the safeguard of the constitution." It remains unknown what additional powers were taken away because it is not specified, but scholars have interpreted the reforms to have transferred the control of public offices such as the dokimasia and euthynai to other bodies. The dokimasia was used as a way to examine the capabilities of people holding office. Similarly, the euthynai was also an examination process all officials underwent which made officials recount the details of their administration as they were leaving office.

The Areopagus remained merely a high court, in control of judging charges of murder and some religious matters. Some historians have argued that Cimon and his hoplites were still in the Peloponnese at the time of this proposal, while others have argued that the proposal followed his return. Those who place the proposals during Cimon's absence suggest that he attempted to overturn them on his return, while those who believe he was present at the proposal believe that he opposed them in the initial debate. All agree that his resistance was doomed to failure by the fact that his hoplite force had just been dismissed by the Spartans, an action which demolished the political standing of Cimon and other pro-Spartan Athenians.

== Death ==
The success of Ephialtes' reforms was rapidly followed by the ostracism of Cimon, which left Ephialtes and his faction firmly in control of the state, although the fully fledged Athenian democracy of later years was not yet fully established; Ephialtes' reforms appear to have been only the first step in the democratic faction's programme. Ephialtes, however, would not live to see the further development of this new form of government: he was assassinated in 461 BC. The earliest source we have on Ephialtes himself and his death is Antiphon (5.68), writing in 420 BC, who states that the identity of the murderer was unknown. “Thus those who murdered Ephialtes, one of your citizens, have never been discovered to this day, and if someone expected his [Ephialtes'] associates to conjecture who were his murderers, and if not, to be implicated in the murder, it would not have been fair to the associates. In addition, the murderers of Ephialtes did not desire to hide the body so there would be no danger of betraying the deed.”

There are varying beliefs on who murdered him. Aristotle, writing c. 325 BCE in his Constitution of the Athenians (25.4) states that Aristodikos of Tanagra was the culprit. According to Plutarch, Idomeneus of Lampsacus accused Ephialtes' political ally, Pericles of murdering him out of jealousy and envy for his reputation among the people. However, Plutarch references Aristotle's Constitution of Athens to argue against this theory.Scholar Robert W. Wallace reasons that had Ephialtes been murdered by somebody outside the radical faction, the radicals would have made Ephialtes a martyr and led a crusade to find the perpetrator. This didn't happen, so the murderer likely came from within Ephialtes' own faction.

== Legacy ==
Overall, Ephialtes' reforms transformed how the political system in Athenian democracy worked. His reforms gave more power to other bodies than they had before, specifically the courts. As a result of this increase in power in the courts, we see other recorded problems that start to arise such as secret balloting in the courts where jurors are able to be bribed. Ephialtes' reforms change the power dynamics in Athenian democratic institutions.

We also know that Ephialtes' bloodline lived on from ancient sources. Demosthenes references Ephialtes in his speech Against Aristocrates which he wrote between 355 and 351 BCE. He is mentioned as the father of Philocrates.
