= Heliastic oath =

Oath sworn by ancient Athenian jurors

The Heliastic oath (Ancient Greek: ἡλιαστικὸς ὅρκος; heliastikos horkos) was an oath sworn by the 6000 dikastes selected each to be jurors in the ancient Athenian law courts. Unlike modern juries, the oath was not sworn at the trial but after their initial selection to be potential jurors on the hill of Ardettos outside the walls of Athens to the south-east.

In Demosthenes' speech Against Timocrates, the oath was quoted, and using quotations from other speeches, we can reconstruct the oath's main lines. The oath was sworn in the names of Zeus, Poseidon, and Demeter, who played a significant role of divine witnesses in Athenian judicial practices. At the end of the oath, the juror said a curse against himself if he should break his oath. Voting in the court was secret though, so a juror could not be accused of breaking the oath. However, the juror could experience divine punishment for breaking the oath.

== Oath ==
Full oath within Against Timocrates:

I will give verdict in accordance with the statutes and decrees of the People of Athens and of the Council of Five-hundred. I will not vote for tyranny or oligarchy. If any man try to subvert the Athenian democracy or make any speech or any proposal in contravention thereof I will not comply. I will not allow private debts to be cancelled, nor lands nor houses belonging to Athenian citizens to be redistributed. I will not restore exiles or persons under sentence of death. I will not expel, nor suffer another to expel, persons here resident in contravention of the statutes and decrees of the Athenian People or of the Council.

I will not confirm the appointment to any office of any person still subject to audit in respect of any other office, to wit the offices of the nine Archons or of the Recorder or any other office for which a ballot is taken on the same day as for the nine Archons, or the office of Marshal, or ambassador, or member of the Allied Congress. I will not suffer the same man to hold the same office twice, or two offices in the same year. I will not take bribes in respect of my judicial action, nor shall any other man or woman accept bribes for me with my knowledge by any subterfuge or trick whatsoever.

I am not less than thirty years old. I will give impartial hearing to prosecutor and defendant alike, and I will give my verdict strictly on the charge named in the prosecution. The juror shall swear by Zeus, Poseidon, and Demeter, and shall invoke destruction upon himself and his household if he in any way transgress this oath, and shall pray that his prosperity may depend upon his loyal observance thereof.

German philologist Max Fränkel (1846 - 1903) reconstructed a summary of the Heliastic Oath, which detailed jurors' pledges to abide by the laws and decisions of the Assembly and Council and to vote based on their understanding of justice when no specific law applied. David C. Mirhady has provided an English translation:

I will vote according to the laws and the votes of the Demos of Athenians and the Council of the Five Hundred, and concerning matters about which there are no laws by the most just understanding, and for the sake of neither favour nor enmity. And I will vote concerning the very matters about which the prosecution is, and I will listen to both the accusers and defendants, both of them equally. I swear these things by Zeus, Apollo, and Demeter, and may I have many good things if I swear well, but destruction for me and my family if I forswear.

Mogens Herman Hansen offers a different translation:

I will cast my vote in consonance with the laws and with the decrees passed by the Assembly and by the Council, but, if there is no law, in consonance with my sense of what is most just, without favour or enmity. I will vote only on the matters raised in the charge, and I will listen impartially to accusers and defenders alike.

== The Oath's Religious and Governmental Impact ==
The oath included a self-imposed curse, where jurors acknowledged the risk of divine retribution if they violated their promise to judge cases impartially, emphasizing the high moral stakes in Athenian legal proceedings. Although court voting was conducted in secret, belief in divine punishment reinforced the oath's significance. The Heliastic Oath was a solemn pledge sworn by jurors in ancient Athenian courts, witnesses to their commitment to fairness and justice. This invocation emphasized the religious and ethical dimensions of Athenian legal practices, linking divine authority to judicial integrity.

== See also ==
- Bouleutic oath
- Heliaia
