= Probolê =

In classical Athenian law, probolê (plural probolai, literally "a throwing forward") was a preliminary accusation, which an intending plaintiff could bring before the ecclesia (assembly) rather than directly to a dikasterion (court). This vote of the ecclesia had no formal effect: it did not bind a successful plaintiff to continue his action in court, nor apparently did it prevent him from doing so if unsuccessful; it imposed no penalty either on plaintiff or on defendant. It did, however, strengthen the hand of the successful plaintiff: after the manner of a straw poll, it showed which way the wind was blowing. We hear of probolê being used in disputes which arise at festivals, and also against sycophants and political leaders who have allegedly deceived the people with false promises.
