= Areopagus (disambiguation) =

The Areopagus was an ancient Greek supreme court.

Areopagus may also refer to:

- Areopagus sermon, a sermon by Paul the Apostle
- Areopagus (poetry), a 16th-century English literary movement
- Areopagus Lodge, a Brazilian Masonic lodge
- Areopagus of Eastern Continental Greece, a regime in Central Greece during the Greek War of Independence
- Supreme Civil and Criminal Court of Greece, a modern Greek supreme court

Areopagite (member of the Areopagus) may refer to:

- Areopagite constitution, an ancient Greek constitution
- Dionysius the Areopagite, ancient Greek Christian bishop and saint of the 1st century
- Pseudo-Dionysius the Areopagite, ancient Greek Christian theologian and Neoplatonic philosopher of the late 5th to early 6th century

== See also ==
- Areopagitica, a 1644 book by John Milton
