= Psephoi =

Ancient Greek voting tokens

Psephos (Ancient Greek: ψῆφος, romanized: psêphos; plural: psephoi, ψῆφοι) was a ballot used by jurors (dikastai) in the law courts of ancient Athens to cast a secret ballot.

Originally, the term referred to a simple pebble, which was used for voting in the early days of Athenian democracy. By the 4th century BCE, these pebbles were replaced by official bronze ballots, known as psephoi. Each juror received two psephoi: one with a solid peg and one with a hollow peg. By concealing the peg with their thumb and forefinger, jurors could vote for the plaintiff (hollow peg) or the defendant (solid peg) without fear of intimidation. The verdict was decided by a simple majority, with a tie resulting in acquittal for the defendant.

== Origin ==
The Greek word psephos (Ancient Greek: ψῆφος) literally means "pebble" or "small stone". In early Athenian practice, jurors cast stones to register their votes, into urns to indicate verdicts. This system, however, was vulnerable to bribery or intimidation. To ensure anonymity, a standardized bronze ballot was introduced, which retained the same name.

== Description ==
Psephoi were circular, coin-like disks about 5 cm (2 in) in diameter, with a cylindrical peg running through the center. They were officially marked, often with the inscription Ψῆφος δημόσια (psêphos dēmosia, "official ballot") and sometimes the owl, symbol of Athens.

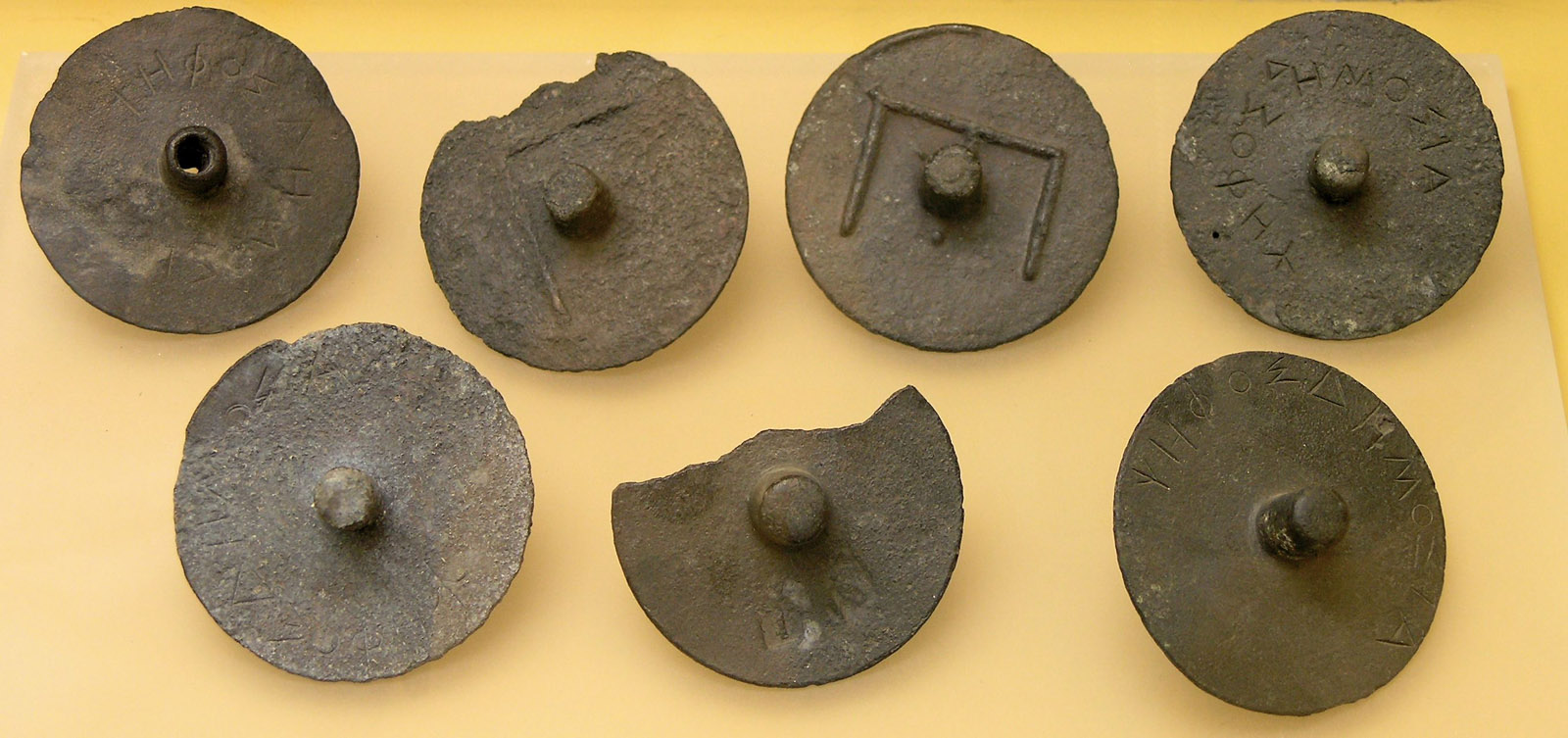
Bronze psephoi from the Ancient Agora of Athens. The hollow-pegged ballot (top) was for conviction, while the solid-pegged one (bottom) was for acquittal, ca. 300 BC. Ancient Agora Museum in Athens.

The crucial design feature was the peg: one ballot given to each juror was solid, while the other was hollow.

- The hollow-pegged psephos was used to vote for the plaintiff (or prosecutor).
- The solid-pegged psephos was used to vote for the defendant.

Excavations in the Agora have found 54 psephoi dating from the 4th to the 2nd centuries. Those from the 4th century are larger than later ones. A few are lead. Their location suggests they were used to vote not just in the courts but also the Boule (Council of 500).

== Voting procedure ==
After the plaintiff and defendant had presented their cases, each juror received one solid and one hollow-pegged ballot. Concealing the ends of the pegs with their fingers, jurors approached two urns:

- a bronze urn where the valid vote was cast;
- a wooden urn where the unused ballot was discarded.

The bronze urn was fitted with a cover that allowed only one ballot to be inserted at a time. This procedure ensured that each juror voted only once and that their choice remained secret. After all jurors had voted, the bronze urn was opened and the ballots were prepared for counting. A simple majority determined the verdict. In the event of a tie, the verdict favored the defendant. If the defendant was found guilty, jurors voted again using the same method to decide between penalties proposed by the prosecution and the defense.

== Counting ==
The actual counting of votes was carried out by four jurors who had been chosen for the task at the start of the proceedings. Once all ballots were cast, slaves carried the bronze urn containing the valid votes to a counting board (pinakion). This board had as many drilled holes as there were ballots. The stems of the psephoi were inserted into these holes, the disk preventing them from falling through. The hollow-stemmed and solid-stemmed ballots were then separated, allowing the results to be tallied quickly and efficiently. The outcome was announced publicly by the court herald.

== See also ==
- Athenian democracy
- Dikastes
- Kleroterion
- Constitution of the Athenians
