= Bouleutic oath =

The bouleutic oath was an oath sworn by the new councillors of the Boule. The oath was sworn after the councillors had passed their dokimasia (investigation) by the out-going Boule. According to Aristotle, the oath was introduced to Athens in 501/0 BC, during the archonship of Hermocreon.

== Contents of the oath ==
The contents of the oath can be constructed using a wide range of different sources. However, these sources cover two hundred years and it is unlikely that the contents of the oath remained the same during these two hundred years. According to Xenophon, the councillors swore "to advise according to the laws." Lysias tells us that they swore "to advise what was best for the city," and Demosthenes tells us that they would do "what was best for the people."

== See also ==
- Heliastic oath
