= Areopagite constitution =

Period in Athenian governance (5th c. BC)

The Areopagite constitution is the modern name for a period in ancient Athens described by Aristotle in his Constitution of the Athenians. According to that work, the Athenian political scene was dominated, between the ostracism of Themistocles in the late 470s BC and the reforms of Ephialtes in 462 BC, by the Areopagus, a traditional court composed of former archons. Modern scholars have debated the existence of this phenomenon, with some concluding that Aristotle and his contemporaries invented it to explain Ephialtes' need to limit the Areopagus' powers, and arguing that the lack of concrete measures establishing the Areopagus' dominance shows that the Areopagite constitution is "palpably unhistorical". Other scholars, such as Donald Kagan, have countered that no concrete measures were necessary, as the Areopagus' dominance was established not through actual changes in the laws but through the prestige of its leading members. Aristotle specifically cites the Areopagites' distribution of money to the public as the citizen body prepared to abandon Athens in the face of the advancing Persian army.

The dominant political figure during this period was Cimon, the son of the famous Miltiades and a hero of the Greco-Persian Wars. To his appeal as a war hero, Cimon added the popularity he won through lavish distribution of the wealth he acquired in his campaigns; Plutarch relates that he opened his lands to the public and held huge public dinners at his home. Cimon pursued an aggressive policy against Persia, while working, in his position as Spartan proxenos at Athens, to secure peace and friendship between those two states. According to the scholars who accept Aristotle's account, Cimon cooperated with other Athenian nobles, many of whom had been ostracized during the ascendancy of Themistocles, to undermine and eventually exile that politician.

The downfall of the Areopagus, and with it Cimon, came in the late 460s BC. After an earthquake at Sparta triggered a helot rebellion, the Spartans appealed to all their allies in the Hellenic League to send them aid. At Athens, a debate took place over whether to grant this request; Cimon and his supporters prevailed, and he was dispatched to the Peloponnese at the head of an army of 4,000 hoplites. When the Athenian force arrived, however, the Spartans dismissed them, alone of all their allies, fearing that they might be receptive to the revolutionary ideas of the revolting helots. While Cimon was gone, meanwhile, Ephialtes proposed a series of reforms in the ecclesia that sharply limited the powers of the Areopagus; these passed, and Cimon was unable to secure their repeal upon his return; shortly afterwards, with his policy of friendship towards Sparta discredited and the democratic party in ascendance, he was exiled. Ephialtes' reforms are considered by Aristotle and modern scholars to mark the end of the Areopagite constitution.
