= Metiochus =

Ancient Greek rhetorician and architect

Metiochus (Ancient Greek: Μητίοχος), also known as Methicus according to some sources, was an ancient Greek rhetorician and architect during the era of Pericles and a close friend of his. Under his design and supervision, a large judicial building was constructed in Athens, named the Meticheion or Methichion (Μητίχιο). This complex consisted of two structures: the first, bearing the name of its architect, housed the sessions of the plenary assembly of the Heliaia. The second, known as the Meizon (Μείζον), hosted the sessions of the Parabyston (Παράβυστον)

== Bibliography ==
- P. Drandakis, Great Greek Encyclopedia, vol. XVII, p. 146, entry Metiochus.
- Walter de Gruyter, Prosopographia Attica, 1964, p. 84
