= Heliaia =

Principal court venue in ancient Athens

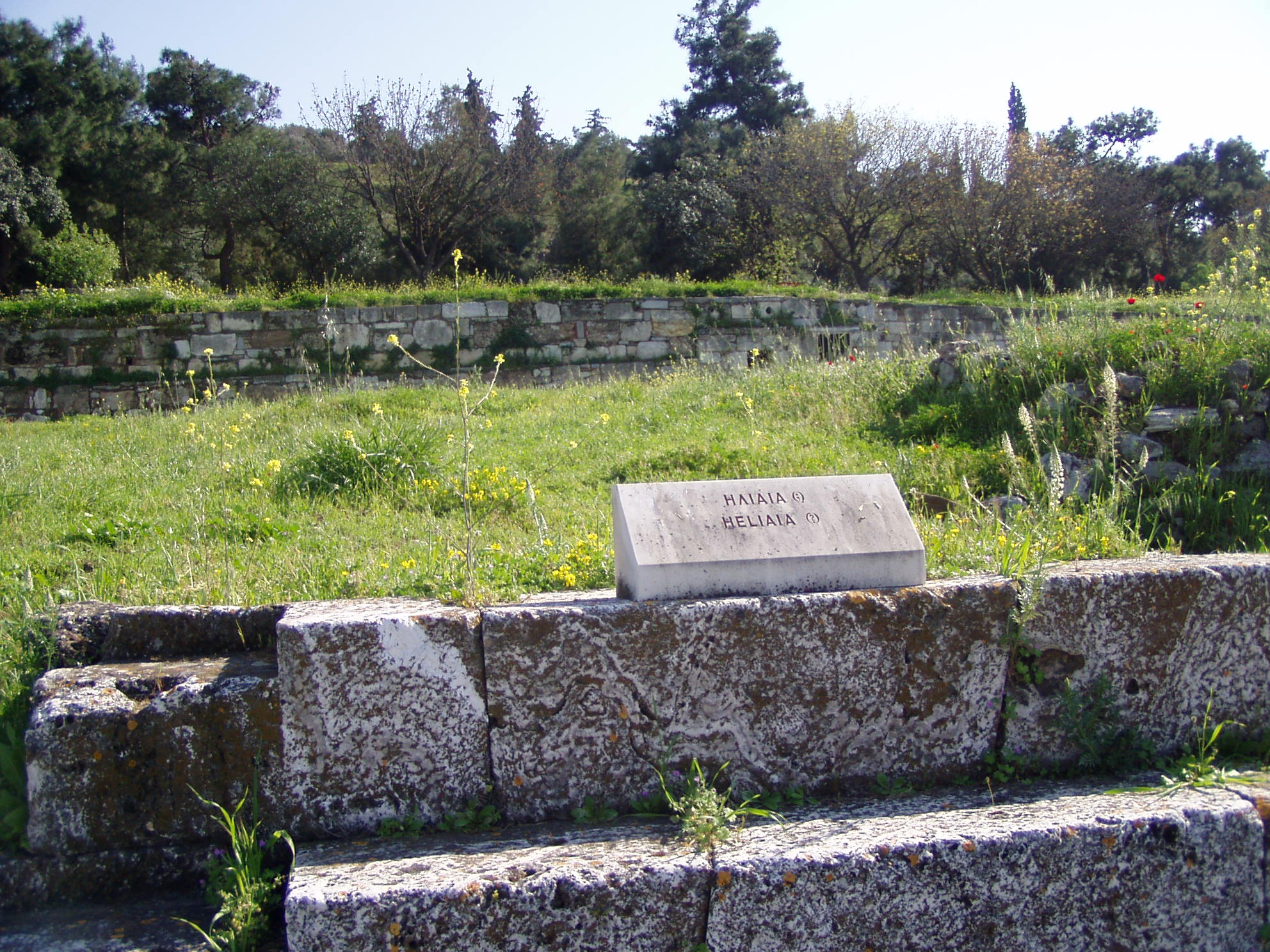
The ruins of Heliaia in the Ancient Agora of Athens.

The Heliaia or Heliaea (Ancient Greek: Ἡλιαία; Doric: Ἁλία Halia) was the largest and most prominent court venue in Classical Athens. The name, which originally designated this specific location, came to be used by ancient sources as a general term for the Athenian popular court system, though modern English-language scholarship typically reserves "Heliaia" for the venue and uses "dikasterion" (pl. dikasteria) for the institutional system.

== Etymology ==
The noun heliaia derives from the Greek verb ἁλίζειν (halizein), meaning "to gather people together." Fifth-century inscriptions render the word as ἐλιαία (eliaia), without the initial eta (IG I³ 40.70–76), reflecting its derivation from roots associated with assembly rather than from ἥλιος (hēlios, "sun").

Cognate terms appear across the Greek world. At Argos, ἁλιαία (haliaia) designated the popular assembly. At Tegea in Arcadia, ἁλιασταί (haliastai) referred to a select body with political and judicial functions (IPArk 3.24–27). These Dorian parallels confirm that the term's root meaning concerns gathering or assembly, not sunlight — though the open-air character of Athenian court sessions may have reinforced the association.

== Meanings of the term ==
In Classical Athens, the noun heliaia carried three related but distinct meanings:

- The institution: the body of 6,000 Athenian citizens (ἡλιασταί, hēliastai) who swore the Heliastic Oath and were eligible to serve as jurors or, in the fourth century, as νομοθέται (nomothetai, legislative panellists)
- A single court: by synecdoche, any particular δικαστήριον (dikastērion) drawn from the larger body — classical sources such as Antiphon (6.21) use heliaia in this narrower sense
- A building: the still-unidentified venue where the largest panels (over 500 and up to 2,500 jurors) gathered, chaired by the thesmothetai (Ath. Pol. 68.1)

Modern scholarship typically uses dikasterion for the court system as an institution, reserving heliaia for the building or for contexts specifically involving the Heliastic Oath.

== Location ==
The physical location of the Heliaia remains unknown. For several decades following excavations in the 1950s, a large unroofed rectangular enclosure at the southwestern corner of the Classical Agora was tentatively identified as the Heliaia. The excavator, Homer A. Thompson, acknowledged this was "nothing more than a likely hypothesis" given the absence of diagnostic material such as dikastic equipment.

The identification appeared on site plans and became widely used, but uncertainty persisted. In the comprehensive 1995 publication of lawcourts in the Athenian Agora, the structure was designated simply as the "Rectangular Peribolos" — a neutral descriptive label avoiding any specific identification.

New epigraphical evidence prompted Ronald S. Stroud in 1998 to propose that the enclosure was in fact the Aiakeion, a shrine dedicated to the hero Aiakos of Aegina. This reidentification has since been widely accepted and is reflected in current Agora Excavations publications.

The search for the Heliaia's actual location continues. Literary sources indicate it was near or within the Agora, but no structure has been positively identified with it.

== The Heliaia and the court system ==
Although "Heliaia" properly designates a venue, ancient sources — particularly orators addressing juries — sometimes used the term to refer to the popular court system generally. This metonymic extension was natural: the Heliaia was the largest and most prestigious venue, hosting the most important political trials, and the annual pool of 6,000 potential jurors swore the Heliastic Oath (ὅρκος ἡλιαστικός) before becoming eligible to serve in any court.

Modern scholarship distinguishes between:

- Heliaia: the specific venue (this article)
- Dikasterion (pl. dikasteria): the institutional system of popular jury courts
- Dikastes (pl. dikastai): the individual citizen-jurors

The institutional development, procedures, and democratic functions of the court system are treated in the main article on the dikasterion.

== The Heliastic Oath ==
Before serving in the annual pool of jurors, citizens swore the Heliastic Oath (ὅρκος ἡλιαστικός), named after this venue. The oath bound jurors to judge according to the laws and decrees of the Assembly and Council, or where no law existed, according to their own sense of justice (γνώμῃ τῇ δικαιοτάτῃ).

The oath was sworn annually. Its text is partially preserved through quotations in the orators, though no complete version survives.

== Relationship to other courts ==
The Heliaia was one of several court venues in Athens, though it was the largest and handled the most significant cases.

Venue	Jurisdiction	Notes
Heliaia	Major political trials, large public prosecutions	Largest panels (up to 2,501 jurors)
Areopagus	Homicide, arson, sacrilege	Composed of former archons; met on the Hill of Ares
Palladion	Unintentional homicide, killing of non-citizens	—
Delphinion	Lawful homicide (e.g., self-defence)	—
Phreatto	Homicide by persons already in exile	Court sat on shore; accused spoke from a boat
Prytaneion	Trials of animals or objects causing death	Archaic survival

The popular courts (dikasteria) other than the Heliaia met in various locations around the Agora. The elaborate daily lottery system for assigning jurors to courts was designed in part to prevent advance knowledge of which venue would hear which case.

== See also ==
- Dikasterion — the Athenian popular court system
- Dikastes — the citizen-jurors
- Heliastic Oath
- Areopagus
- Athenian democracy
- Ancient Greek law
- Graphe paranomon

== Sources ==
- Boegehold, Alan L. (1995). The Lawcourts at Athens: Sites, Buildings, Equipment, Procedure, and Testimonia. The Athenian Agora. Vol. 28. Princeton: American School of Classical Studies at Athens. ISBN 978-0876612286.
- Camp, John McK. (2010). The Athenian Agora: Site Guide (5th ed.). Princeton: American School of Classical Studies at Athens. ISBN 978-0876616574.
- Gagliardi, Lorenzo (2012). "Heliaia". In Bagnall, Roger S. (ed.). The Encyclopedia of Ancient History. Wiley-Blackwell. doi:10.1002/9781444338386.wbeah13110.
- Hansen, Mogens Herman (1987). The Athenian Democracy in the Age of Demosthenes. Oxford: Blackwell. ISBN 978-0631180173.
- Harris, Edward M. (2013). The Rule of Law in Action in Democratic Athens. Oxford: Oxford University Press. ISBN 978-0199899166.
- Robinson, Eric W. (2011). Democracy Beyond Athens. Cambridge. ISBN 9780511977527.
- Stroud, Ronald S. (1998). The Athenian Grain-Tax Law of 374/3 B.C. Hesperia Supplement. Vol. 29. Princeton: American School of Classical Studies at Athens. ISBN 978-0876615294.
- Thompson, Homer A. (1954). "Excavations in the Athenian Agora: 1953". Hesperia. 23: 31–67. doi:10.2307/146723.
