= Law court (ancient Athens) =

Institutions in Ancient Greece

In ancient Athens, law courts were the systems by which Athenians could bring lawsuits against other individuals. The first Athenian law courts were inaccessible to lower-class citizens and were judged by the highest class. By the end of the 4th century BCE, courts had become accessible to free male citizens, with cases determined by juries composed of other citizens. Court cases were held in a variety of buildings, which depended on the crime committed, as well as the type of case that the prosecutor wanted to bring.

== History ==
According to Aristotle, Athenian laws in the time before Draco were under the purview of the Council of the Areopagus. The council was ostensibly limited to this role, but in practice controlled much more of the Athenian state. It was composed of former Archons who were selected by birth and wealth, meaning that the laws were controlled by the highest social classes. Whether the Areopagus was actually the site of court remains unclear, though the council was expected to preside over laws, magistrates, and lawbreakers. However, our understanding of early Athenian law courts remains low. There are few sources on early Athenian law courts that remain, with most information coming from sources written several hundred years after.

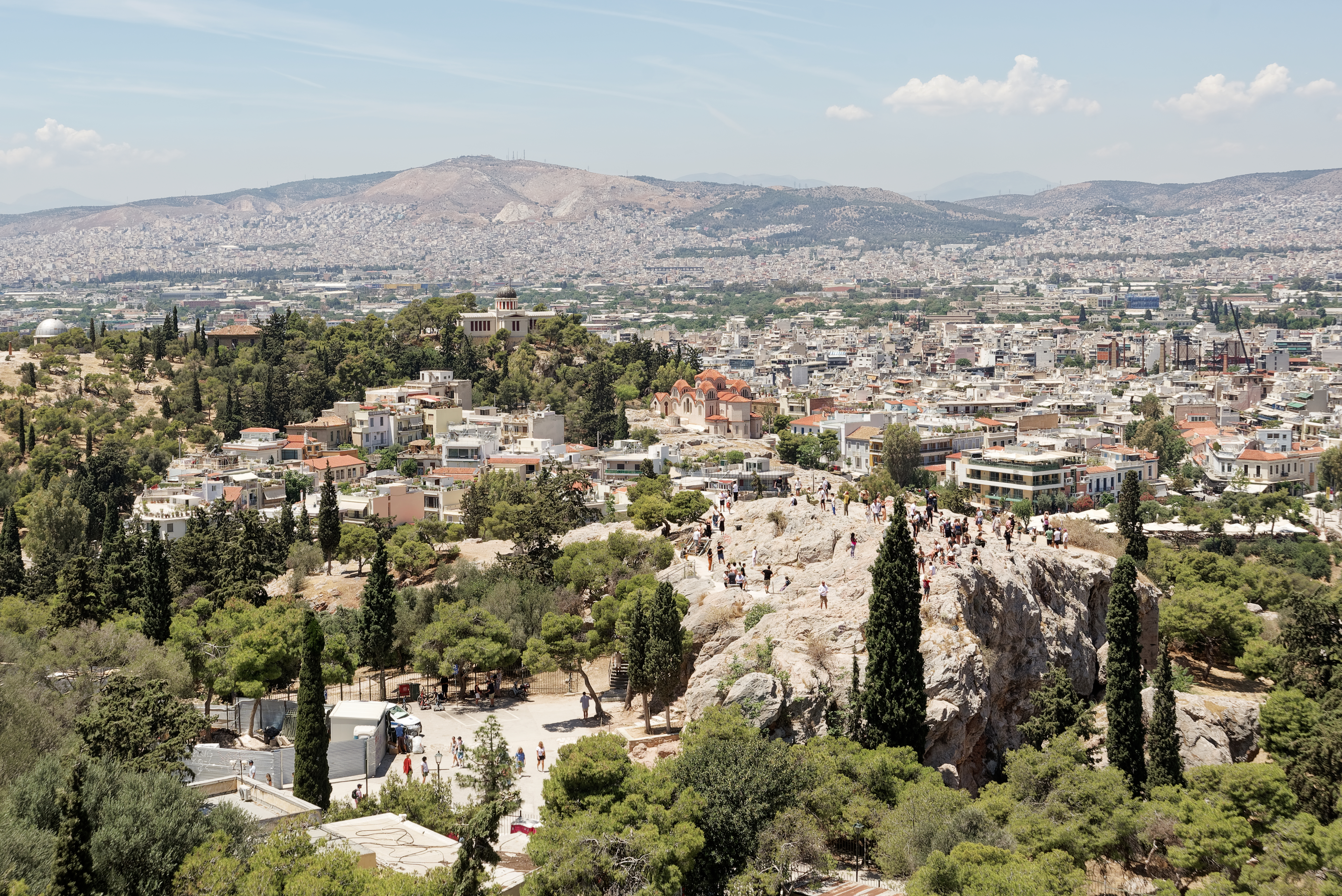
The Areopagus outcropping, location of the oldest Athenian court.

Draco's reforms allowed more of the Athenian population to participate in court. According to Aristotle, laborers were allowed to participate in court for the first time. The Archons were also further randomized, with one of ten possible choices being selected by lottery. Under Solon, participation in law courts was further democratized. Solon divided Athenians into four separate classes (Pentakosiomedimnoi, Hippada Telountes, Zeugitai, and Thetes) based on wealth, with each class allowed to both be jurors and bring lawsuits against others.

The court system was also expanded during this period. The Areopagus no longer reviewed as many cases, instead being relegated to considering homicide charges. Public courts were expanded, with cases being heard by jurors selected from among the Athenian population. Instead of the Areopagus hearing all cases, the reforms of Ephialtes shifted more court cases to the popular courts.

== Description ==
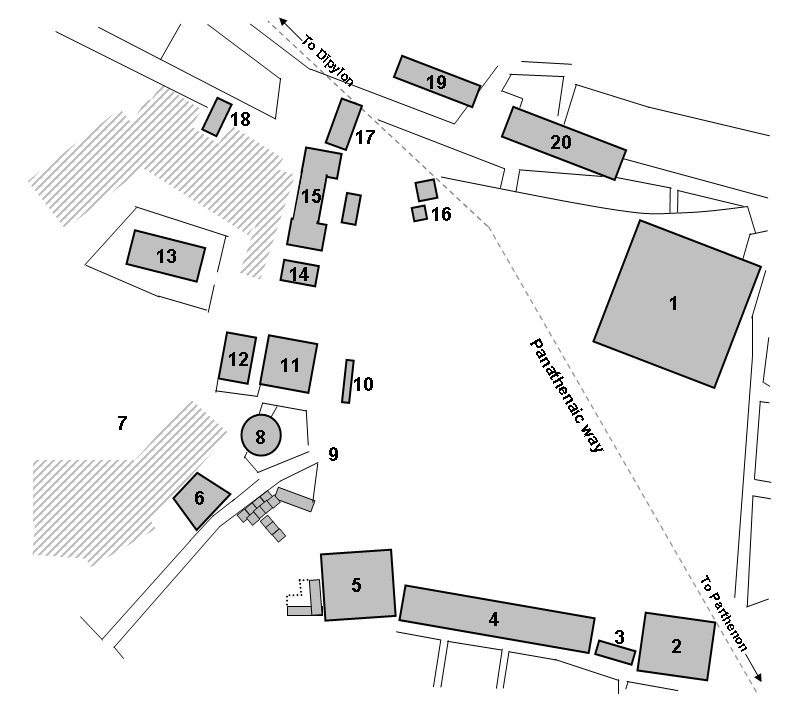
Map of the Athenian Agora. Building 1 was likely used as a law court.

The exact physical locations and number of courts remains unclear. There were likely several court buildings being used at any one time, with up to six courts running at once. A court building would have been required to hold several hundred people at once, with space for both jurors and bystanders to watch the proceedings. The Heliaia, the largest court, would have required a space for several thousand people to attend, either seated or standing. It is unclear whether court buildings would have been roofed, but scholars like Alan Boegehold have argued that some buildings were originally open before later being roofed. By Aristotle's time, court buildings were differentiated by a colored marking on the doorway, leading to courts being called things like the Red Court and Green Court.

There were five courts for certain specific crimes. These were the Areopagus, Palladion, Delphinion, Phreatto, and Prytaneion. These courts dealt with homicide, arson, and poisoning; involuntary injuries and killing of enslaved people and non-Athenians; lawful killings; homicide or injury after committing a pardonable offence; murder from either animals, inanimate objects, or unknown killers, respectively. The court could meet in any of these buildings depending on the type of crime that had been committed. Of these, only the location of the Areopagus is known, located on a rock outcropping in the city.

== Trials ==
=== Procedure ===
Trials began when a suitor brought a lawsuit against another citizen in either public or private court. A magistrate would add this to a list, either public or private depending on the type of lawsuit. Depending on the day, either public or private suits would be called. The location of that the court would meet in was determined by the crime alleged, with certain crimes, like homicide, meeting in specific buildings.

Jurors would then be randomly assigned to a court. The plaintiff would begin by submitting the law or laws under which they were suing the other party. Both sides of the case would present a speech, presenting their argument, as well as witnesses and physical evidence. Usually, the speeches would be delivered by the plaintiff and defendant, though the speeches could sometimes either be written or delivered by a specialized writer. Occasionally, there was also a rebuttal speech. The length of these speeches was determined by the type of case, kept equal by water clocks. Private lawsuits featured a preliminary step, where a randomly selected arbitrator would attempt to reconcile the parties. Only if this failed would the private suit go to trial.

Once speeches had been delivered, jurors would vote on the outcome. Each juror was given a ballot ball marked for either the plaintiff or defendant. These balls were placed into two urns: a bronze urn for the vote the juror wanted to make and a wooden urn to return the other ball. The outcome of the case was determined by a simple majority.

=== Juries ===
By the 4th century BCE, public Athenian courts generally consisted of a jury that would decide on the judgement for the case. For public cases, jurors typically numbered 500, occasionally with odd numbers to decide tiebreaks. Private cases usually numbered between 200 and 400. In some cases, the number of jurors could exceed this. These jurors were selected from a pool of 6,000 Athenian citizens, though only around 1,500 to 2,000 would actually be empaneled at any one time. The original jury pool was also randomly selected from the broader pool of Athenian citizens and would serve as the jury pool for one year. In order to qualify as a juror, Athenians had to be over thirty, male, without debt, and not disenfranchised. Juries were paid two obols per day, later increasing to three obols. This was approximately the same as what most workers made.

Once selected, jurors would be randomly assigned to a court, differentiated by the color of the doorway. Juries were likely allowed some amount of leeway in their interpretation of the laws. Scholars like Adriaan Lanni have argued that the laws provided guidelines for jury decisions, with social norms also having influence on the decision of the court. Jurors were also encouraged to be active participants in the case, with jurors occasionally refusing to listen to arguments they did not agree with. This could take the form of a jury shouting down a flawed argument.

=== Jury participation ===
Before the reforms of Solon, the court system was inaccessible to the average Athenian. However, Athenian courts around the late 4th century were legally accessible to free Athenian men, regardless of social class. In public cases, any adult male citizen could bring a lawsuit. However, scholars remain in some disagreement about whether or not courts were used by the average person in practice. Some scholars, like Victor Bers, have argued that the quantity of cases would not make sense without lawsuits by lower class citizens. Others have pointed to the surviving records that overwhelmingly feature higher class individuals speaking in trials to contest this.

The court system was almost completely inaccessible to women, non-Athenians, and enslaved people. Both women and enslaved people required the participation of an Athenian citizen to engage in the court. For enslaved people, all lawsuits were brought by or against their owner, rather than them. Women required their legal male guardian to participate, and non-Athenians were only able to participate in specific lawsuits, like commercial suits.

=== Outcomes ===
Punishments enacted by public law courts tended to fall into four categories: fines, loss of citizenship, exile, and execution. The level of punishment varied depending on the court. In a public case, a plaintiff was fined if they could not secure a one-fifth of the votes, though this was not true for private cases. There were two ways that a court determined what the punishment should be. The first was to use the punishment as prescribed in the law that the plaintiff submitted. If this was not accepted, both the plaintiff and the defendant could submit punishments, which the jury would vote on.
