= Buffalo Law Review =

- Discipline: Law
- Language: English

Publication details
- History: 1951–present
- Publisher: University at Buffalo School of Law
- Frequency: 5 issues/year

Standard abbreviations
- Bluebook: Buff. L. Rev.
- ISO 4: Buffalo Law Rev.

Indexing
- ISSN: 0023-9356
- LCCN: 67059048
- OCLC no.: 01537639

The Buffalo Law Review is the general law review of the State University of New York University at Buffalo School of Law. The journal currently publishes 5 issues per year. As a general law review, it focuses on current developments across the legal field, publishing on a variety of topics. As of 2015, the Buffalo Law Review was ranked 51st in the nation among general law reviews.

Since it was first published in 1951, the Buffalo Law Review has been a student run general law review, covering a variety of topics. Its first volume contained articles written by then Associate Judge Charles S. Desmond of the New York Court of Appeals and Associate Justice Robert H. Jackson of the United States Supreme Court. The journal publishes articles written by scholars, practicing attorneys, and judges from across the legal profession. First year students are selected according to a scoring system that factors in grades, a written casenote, and a test in which the student must correct a number of citations.

Every year, the journal awards the Justice Philip Halpern Award to one graduating member for excellence in writing and the Carlos C. Alden Award to one graduating member for making the greatest contribution to the journal.

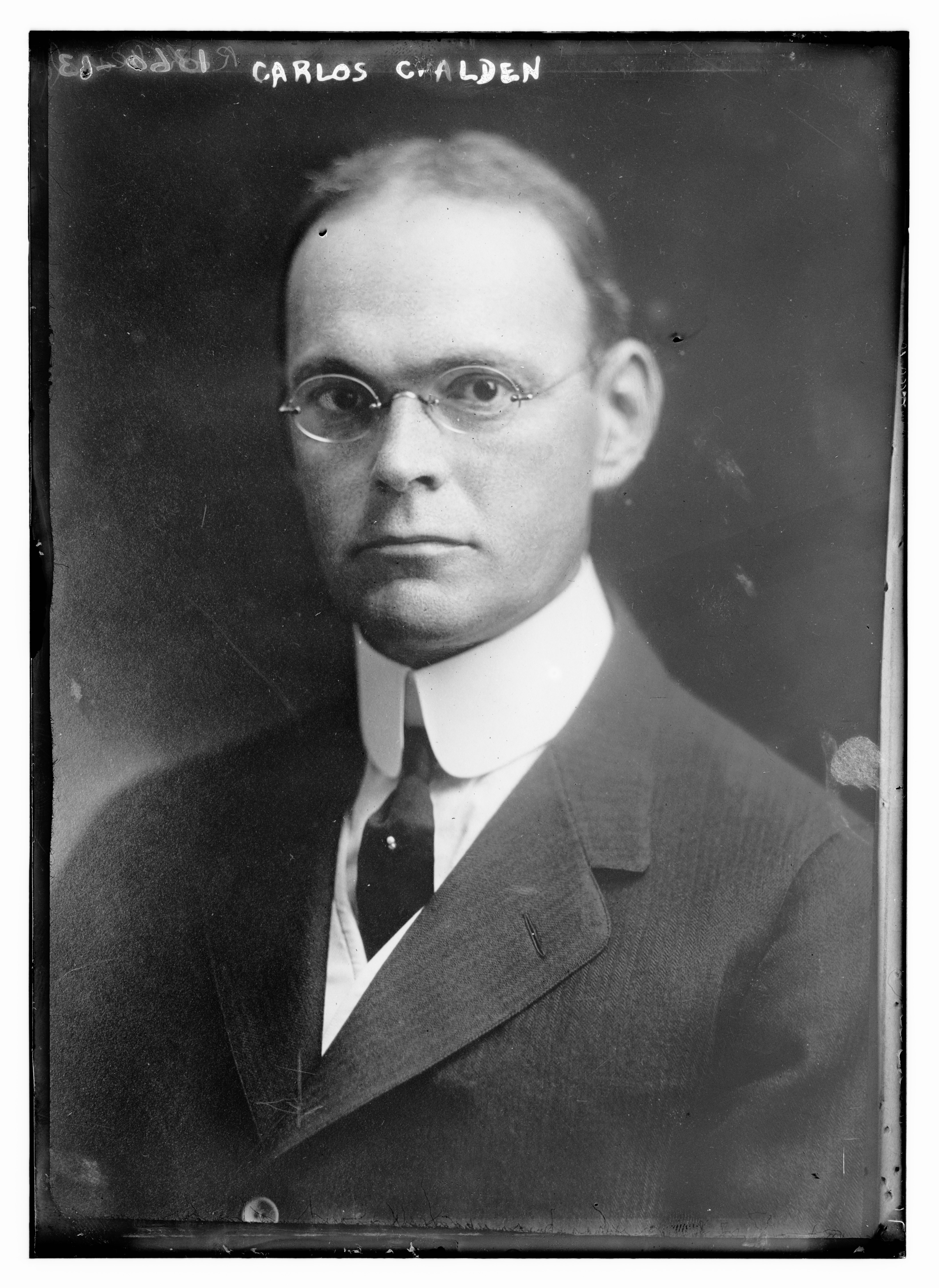
Carlos C. Alden
