= Dikastes =

Dikastes (Greek: δικαστής, pl. δικασταί dikastai) was a legal office in ancient Greece. In the broadest sense, a dikastes was a judge or juror. However, the term usually refers more specifically to a judicial officer in ancient Athens during its democratic period who formed part of a body constitutionally empowered to judge matters of law and custom.

== Selection process ==
The Athenian dikasterion (court) resembled the modern Western jury in some respects. For instance, both consisted of a number of members of the public, assembled in the name of the country to judge between its individual citizens, who took office after swearing an oath to well and truly discharge their duties. However, there were otherwise significant differences between the two types of institutions.

In Athens, 6,000 people were selected by lot as dikastai for each year. To be eligible to serve as a dikastes, an individual had to be:

- a free citizen;
- fully enfranchised;
- not less than thirty (30) years of age.

Selection was supervised by the Athenian archons and their official scribe, each of whom drew the names of six hundred members of their phyle. The 6,000 drawn were then sorted, again randomly, into eleven sections: 10 sections of 500 members each, and a supernumerary section of 1,000 to supply individuals in the event that members of the sections of 500 were unavailable. Each of the 10 sections was designated with one of the first 10 letters of the alphabet.

When the dikastai had been selected and assigned to sections, each dikastes was provided with a small tablet called a pinakion (πινάκιον; pl. pinakia), which served as a certificate of their appointment. Dikastic pinakia bore the letter of the section and the name of the individual. A number of bronze plates have been found in Piraeus which are believed to have been dikastic pinakia; they bore the information described above, as well as owls, Gorgon heads, and other heraldic devices associated with Athens. The supernumerary dikastai may have had a different token, but the evidence in this regard is inconclusive.

=== Oath ===
Before assuming his office, the dikastes had to swear the oath of office. This was initially done on the Ardittos Hill, located just outside ancient Athens and a short distance east of the Ilissos River. At later times, however, the place of oath-swearing moved to another venue which is unidentified. In Demosthenes' time, the oath included the following elements:

- an assertion that the dikastes was qualified;
- a commitment by him to carry out the functions of his office faithfully and incorruptibly in general;
- a commitment to do the same with specific regard to cases concerning the appointment of magistrates, over which the office of dikastes had significant control;
- a general promise to support the existing constitution, which was considered relevant given that a dikastes might be called upon to judge a defendant accused of attempting to subvert the constitution.

=== Allotment ===
Once the dikastai were selected and assigned, and had sworn their oaths, their appointment lasted for a year. During that year, each time it became necessary to empanel a number of dikastai to try a case, the thesmothetai (junior archons) would carry out the process for doing so.

One or more sections might be assigned to try a case. In most cases, court assignments were decided by lot: tickets would be drawn from two containers, one containing tickets signifying individual sections of dikastai, the other containing tickets denoting courts. For a case which required a single section of dikastai, the thesmothetai would draw one ticket from each container, determining that, for instance, section B would sit in court F. If the case required multiple sections of dikastai, the thesmothetai would carry out essentially the same process, but draw as many additional tickets as required from the "sections" container, determining that, for instance, sections A and B would sit in court F. When court assignments had been made, each dikastes received a staff (βακτήρια or ῥάβδος) bearing the letter and colour of the court to which he was assigned, which authorised him to enter the court and distinguished him from members of the public attempting to do the same.

While dikastes were often assigned a full section at a time, this is known not to have always been the case. Sometimes only part of a section was empanelled, either alone or in addition to one or more whole sections. There were also cases which could only be tried by particular categories of judges. For instance, violators of the mysteries (ancient religious schools of a confidential nature) could be tried only by initiates of the mysteries. Military offenders could be tried only by those who were or ought to have been their military colleagues at the time of the offences. While the details of the selection must have differed in these cases, the exact differences are unknown.

There was also one other known exception. At the expiration of their terms of office, magistrates and public officers would undergo an accountability process known as an euthyna ("straightening"). The euthyna consisted of two parts: the logos, concerning the handing of public money, and the euthynai proper, concerning general conduct in office. Judicial affairs relating to the logos in particular were dealt with not by the thesmothetai, but by a board of logistai ("accountants," or less literally public auditors); the euthynai proper was overseen by euthynoi ("straighteners") who were appointed by the boule.

== Payment ==
The dikastes received a fee for their attendance (τὸ δικαστικόν or μίσθος δικαστικός). Payments for dikastai are believed to have been instituted by Pericles. They are believed initially to have been set at 1 obol; this is based primarily on a passage in Aristophanes' The Knights, in which the character Strepsiades says that he spent the first obol he ever received for service as a dikastes on a toy for his son. By about 421 BCE, the rate had been increased to 3 oboli. The scholia (commentary) on Aristophanes asserts that the pay was at some point 2 oboli, but this is believed to be an erroneous inference by the scholiast; it is considered unlikely that the rate was ever 2 oboli.

In the Athenian dikasterion, payment was made after each session by the kolakretai (public magistrates with responsibility for certain financial matters). When a dikastes entered the court bearing his dikastes' staff, he received a tablet or ticket (σύμβολον symbolon). After the business of the court was over, the dikastes gave his ticket to the prytaneis (executives of the boule) and received his fee in return. Those who arrived late did not receive their fee. According to Aristophanes, the sum of these fees amounted to 150 talents per year, a sum which is very high and can perhaps only be applied to the most flourishing times of Athens.
