= Adriaan Lanni =

American legal scholar and classicist

- Occupations: Legal scholar; classicist
- Awards: Guggenheim Fellowship (2017)

Academic background
- Education: Yale University (BA); University of Cambridge (MPhil); University of Michigan (PhD)
- Thesis: Democratic Justice: Relevance and Discretion in the Lawcourts of Classical Athens (2003)
- Doctoral advisor: Bruce Frier; Thomas A. Green

Academic work
- Discipline: Classics; legal studies
- Sub-discipline: Ancient Athenian law; restorative justice
- Institutions: Harvard Law School

Adriaan Lanni is an American legal scholar and classicist. She is Touroff-Glueck Professor of Law at Harvard School of Law. As a classicist, she is author of Law and Justice in the Courts of Classical Athens (2006) and Law and Order in Ancient Athens (2016) and editor of A Global History of Crime and Punishment in Antiquity (2023), and she is a 2017 Guggenheim Fellow. She also specializes in restorative justice as a legal scholar.

== Biography ==
Lanni was born to union organizers, an upbringing she credited to influencing her interest in politics. She attended Staten Island Academy, where she graduated in 1990; she was inducted to their Athletic Hall of Fame in 2018.

Lanni obtained a BA summa cum laude in Classical Civilization from Yale University in 1994. She later received a Marshall Scholarship to attend the University of Cambridge, where she studied ancient Athenian law and obtained a MPhil in Classics in 1996. Returning to the United States, she got a PhD in History from the University of Michigan in 2003; her doctoral dissertation Democratic Justice: Relevance and Discretion in the Lawcourts of Classical Athens was supervised by Bruce Frier and Thomas A. Green. Additionally, she writes about the legal system in ancient Greece, where she is author of Law and Justice in the Courts of Classical Athens (2006) and Law and Order in Ancient Athens (2016). In 2017, she was awarded a Guggenheim Fellowship in Classics. She was editor of A Global History of Crime and Punishment in Antiquity, the first volume of the 2023 series A Global History of Crime and Punishment.

Lanni also obtained a JD from Yale Law School in 1999 and clerked for Alaska Supreme Court Justice Dana Fabe and federal circuit judge Stephen Reinhardt. She had been interested in labor law, but switched to criminal law after attending a class taught by anti-death penalty activist Stephen Bright. As a legal scholar, she specializes in restorative justice, having contributed to the Buffalo Law Review and Northwestern University Law Review on the subject. She is currently working on an upcoming book, Introduction to Restorative Justice, with Elgar Advanced Introductions. She has also volunteered at local nonprofit Communities for Restorative Justice.

After holding visiting professorships at the University of Freiburg and Stanford Law School, Lanni joined Harvard Law School in 2005 as an Assistant Professor of Law. In 2010, she was promoted to full professor. In 2016, she was appointed Touroff-Glueck Professor of Law.

== Works ==
- Law and Justice in the Courts of Classical Athens (2006) (Note: Reviews of this book:)
- Law and Order in Ancient Athens (2016)
- A Global History of Crime and Punishment in Antiquity (2023)
