= Euthyna =

The term euthyna (Ancient Greek: εὔθυνα) and (in late Greek only) euthyne (Ancient Greek: εὔθυνη), meaning straightening, was the examination of accountability which every public officer underwent on the expiration of his office in some states in Classical Greece. In Athens the examination had two parts; the logos ('statement of account'), concerned the handling of public money and dealt with by a board of ten logistai (λογισταί, accountants), and the euthynai proper, an opportunity to raise any other objection to one's conduct in office, dealt with by a board of ten euthynoi (εὔθυνοι, straighteners) appointed by the boule. These officials could dismiss accusations or pass them on to the courts.
