= Dokimasia =

Legal process in classical Athens

In Ancient Greece, dokimasia (Greek: δοκιμασία) was the name used at Athens to denote the process of ascertaining the capacity of the citizens for the exercise of public rights and duties.

If, for instance, a young citizen was to be admitted among the epheboi, he was examined in an assembly of his district to find out whether he was descended on both sides from Athenian citizens, and whether he possessed the physical capacity for military service. All officials, too—even the members of the Boule, the Council of 500—had to submit to an examination before entering upon their office. The purpose of this was to ascertain not their actual capacity for the post, which was presupposed in all candidates, but their descent from Athenian citizens, their life and character, and (in the case of some offices which involved the administration of large sums) even the amount of their property. The individual's examination was not nearly a test for someone's knowledge or capability to perform well in office, but rather a test to ensure that the individual had met his obligations as a tax paying citizen. One example of this would be shown as a check on the individual's ability to not deprive his family of any monetary support while serving in an unpaid office.

The examination was carried on in public by the archons in the presence of the Boule, and anyone present had the right to raise objections. If such objections were held to be valid, the candidate was rejected; but he had the right to appeal the decision to a court, which would take cognizance of the matter in judicial form. On the other hand, if he were accepted, anyone who thought his claims insufficient had the right of instituting judicial proceedings against him. If the decision was adverse, he would lose his office and be further liable to punishment depending on the offence—which could be, for instance, that of unlawfully assuming the rights of a citizen.

The archons within a dokimasia would not have to base the decisions they made to exclude an incoming official on strict laws, they were allowed to follow their own political and/or moral standings to see if a man should be viewed as dangerous to the people.

A speaker in a public assembly might thus be brought before a court by any citizen, for only one possessing the full right of citizenship could legally address the people. The question might thus be raised whether the orator were not actually atimos, or guilty of an offence which involved atimia.
