= Mogens Herman Hansen =

Danish classical philologist and demographer (1940–2024)

Mogens Herman Hansen FBA (20 August 1940 – 22 June 2024) was a Danish classical philologist and classical demographer who was one of the leading scholars in Athenian Democracy and the Polis.

== Early life ==
Hansen was born in Frederiksberg in Copenhagen, the son of Gudrun Heslet, a translator, and Herman Hansen, an engineer. He attended Øregård and Østre Borgerdyd schools. When a youth, after a car accident in which his fiancee died, he was hospitalised for many months. Afterwards, he married, Birgitte Holt, one of the doctors aiding his recovery. They had a son, Toke.

== Career ==
Hansen studied ancient Greek and history at University of Copenhagen, finishing his masters in 1967. The following year he was engaged to work at the same university. He has written many books about Athenian Democracy. From 1993 to 2005 he was the director of the Copenhagen Polis Centre. He "did not seek promotion to a professorship" and retired in 2010.

Hansen was a visiting fellow at the University of Melbourne, University of British Columbia, Wolfson College (University of Cambridge), Princeton University, and Churchill College (Cambridge). Hansen was a member of the Royal Danish Academy of Sciences, by German Archaeological Institute and the British Academy.

In June 2010, Hansen retired after 40 years at Copenhagen University. He died on 22 June 2024, at the age of 83.

He extended his work on ancient Greek democracy to the possibilities of modern direct democracy. It has been commented that his work has become "good to think with" by those seeking to reform contemporary democracy.

== Major works in English ==
- The Sovereignty of the People's Court in Athens in the 4th c. B.C. (1974)
- The Athenian Assembly (1987)
- The Athenian Democracy in the Age of Demosthenes (1991)
- Acts of the Copenhagen Polis Centre I-VII (1993-2005)
- Papers of the Copenhagen Polis Centre I-VII (1994-2004)
- A Comparative Study of Thirty City-State Cultures (2000)
- Inventory of Archaic and Classical Poleis (2004)

== Sources ==
- Kraks Blå Bog 2006/2007
