= Ecclesia (ancient Greece) =

Assembly of the democracy of ancient Greek city-states

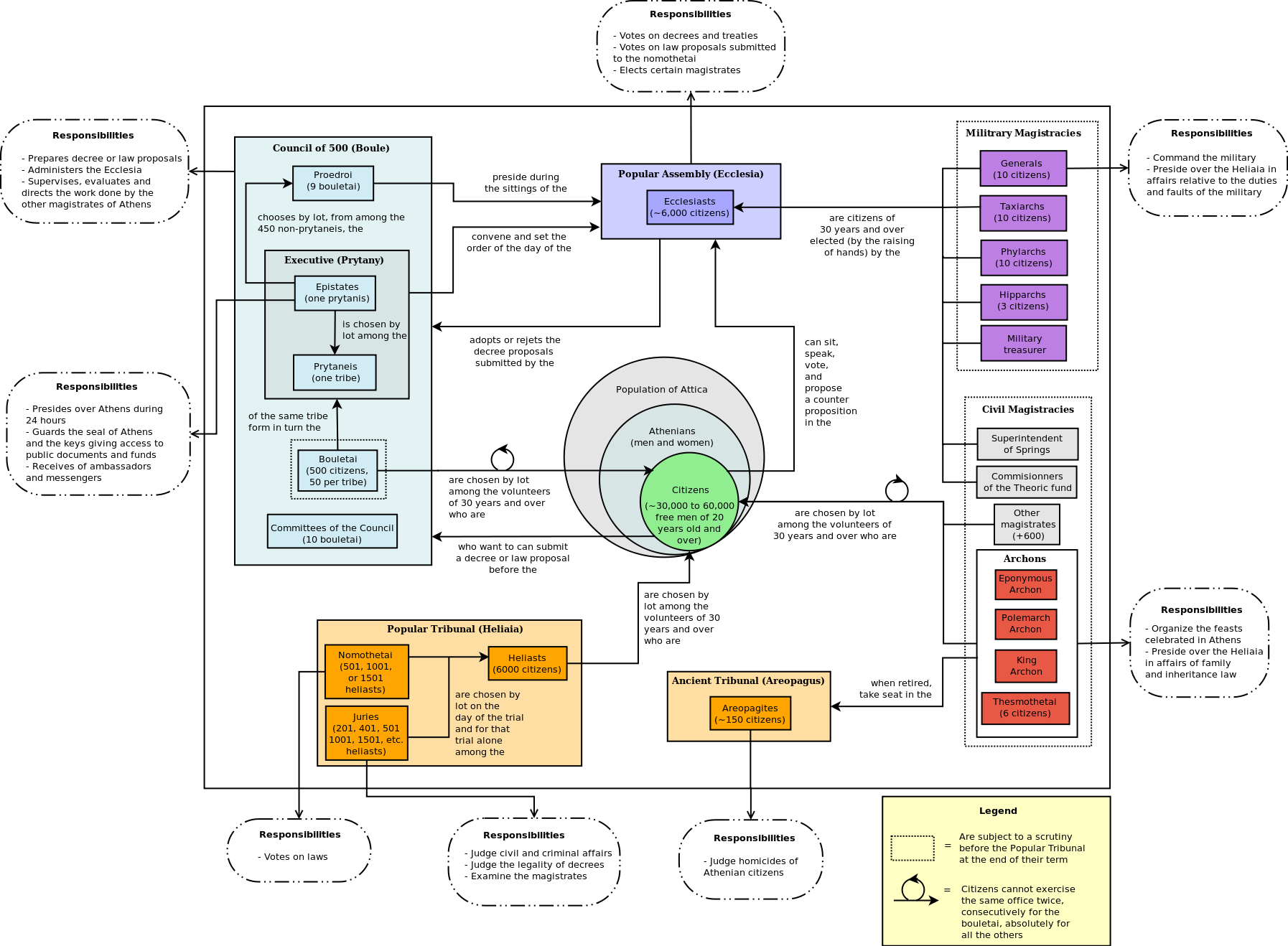
Constitution of the Athenians, 4th century BC. The ecclesia is represented by the small blue box in the top centre of the image. This diagram is based on Aristotle's Constitution of the Athenians.

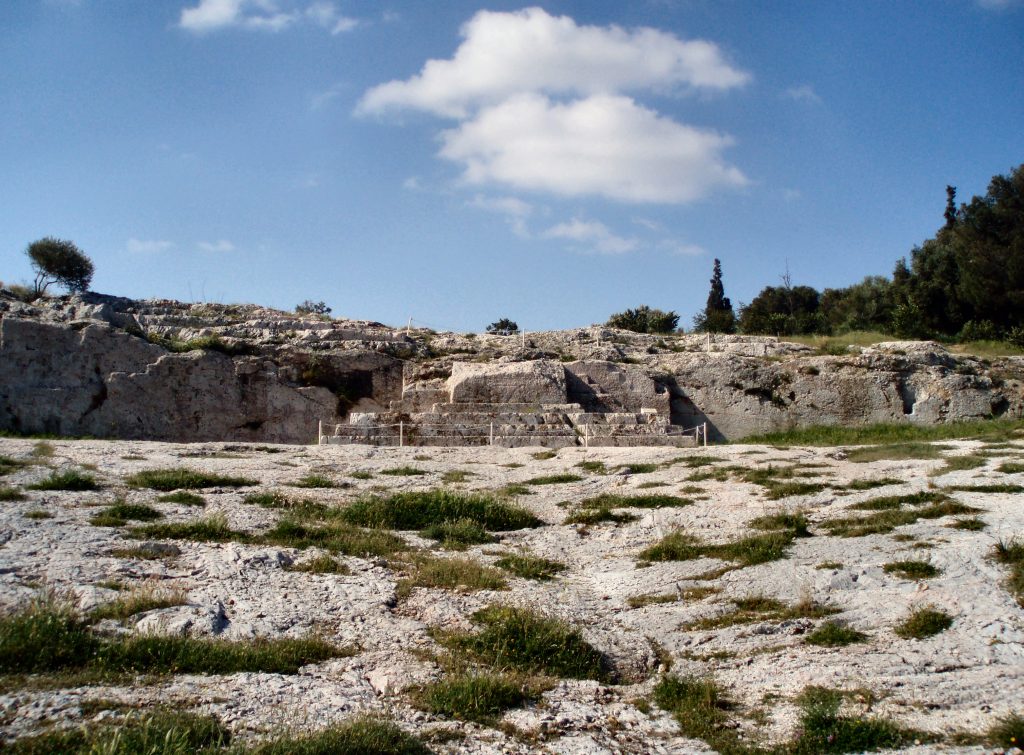
The ekklesia in Athens convened on a hill called the Pnyx

The ecclesia or ekklesia (Greek: ἐκκλησία) was the assembly of the citizens in city-states of ancient Greece.

== Ecclesia of Athens ==
The ecclesia of ancient Athens is particularly well-known. It was the popular assembly, open to all male citizens as soon as they qualified for citizenship. In 594 BC, Solon allowed all Athenian citizens to participate, regardless of class. The assembly was responsible for declaring war, military strategy and electing the strategoi and other officials. It was responsible for nominating and electing magistrates (árchontes), thus indirectly electing the members of the Areopagus. It had the final say on legislation and the right to call magistrates to account after their year of office. A typical meeting of the Assembly probably contained around 6,000 people, out of a total citizen population of 30,000–60,000. It would have been difficult, however, for non-wealthy people outside the urban centre of Athens to attend until reimbursements for attendance were introduced in the 390s. It originally met once every month, but later met three or four times per month. The agenda for the ecclesia was established by the Boule, the popular council. Votes were taken by a show of hands, counting of stones and voting using broken pottery.

A police force of 300 Scythian slaves carried red ochre-colored ropes to induce the citizens who loitered in the agora of Athens to attend the meetings of the assembly. Anyone with red-colored clothes who was not in the meeting was liable to a penalty.

A quorum of 6,000 members was required sometimes to do business. The ecclesia elected the Boule annually by lot. Some of their power under Solon was delegated to the Court by Pericles in his reforms.

== Ekklesiasterion ==
In ancient Greece, an ekklesiasterion or ecclesiasterion was a building specifically built for the purpose of holding the supreme meetings of the ecclesia. Like many other cities, Athens did not have an ekklesiasterion. Instead, the regular meetings of the assembly were held on the Pnyx and two annual meetings took place in the Theatre of Dionysus. Around 300 BC, the meetings of the ecclesia were moved to the theatre. The meetings of the assembly could attract large audiences: 6,000 citizens might have attended in Athens during the fifth century BC.

== See also ==
- Ecclesia (Sparta)
- Areopagus
- Athenian democracy
- Constitution of the Athenians (Aristotle)
- Heliaia
- Mytilenian Debate
- Boule (ancient Greece)
