= Areopagus =

Promontory in Athens, and the ancient council associated with it

Coordinates: 37°58′20″N 23°43′25″E

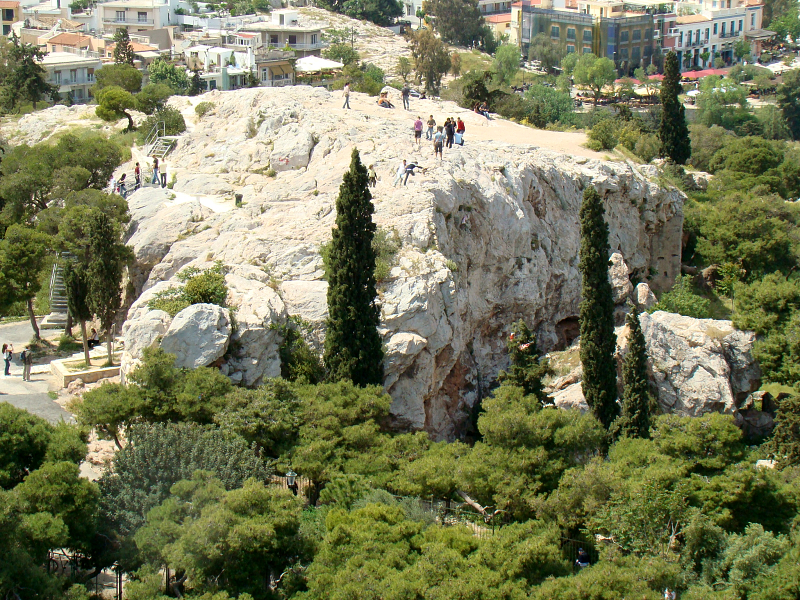
The Areopagus as viewed from the Acropolis.

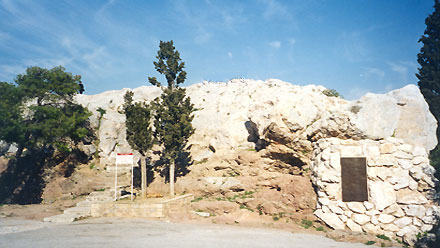
Engraved plaque containing Apostle Paul's Areopagus sermon.

The Areopagus (/æriˈɒpəɡəs/) was a principal council of ancient Athens, later serving mainly as a judicial body responsible for cases of homicide, wounding, and certain religious offenses. It met on a rocky outcrop called the Hill of Ares, northwest of the Acropolis in Athens, Greece, from which it took its name. Its English name comes from the Late Latin composite form of the Greek name Areios Pagos, translated 'Hill of Ares' (Ancient Greek: Ἄρειος Πάγος). The war god Ares was supposed to have been tried by the other gods on the Areopagus for the murder of Poseidon's son Halirrhothius, a typical example of an aetiological myth.

== History ==
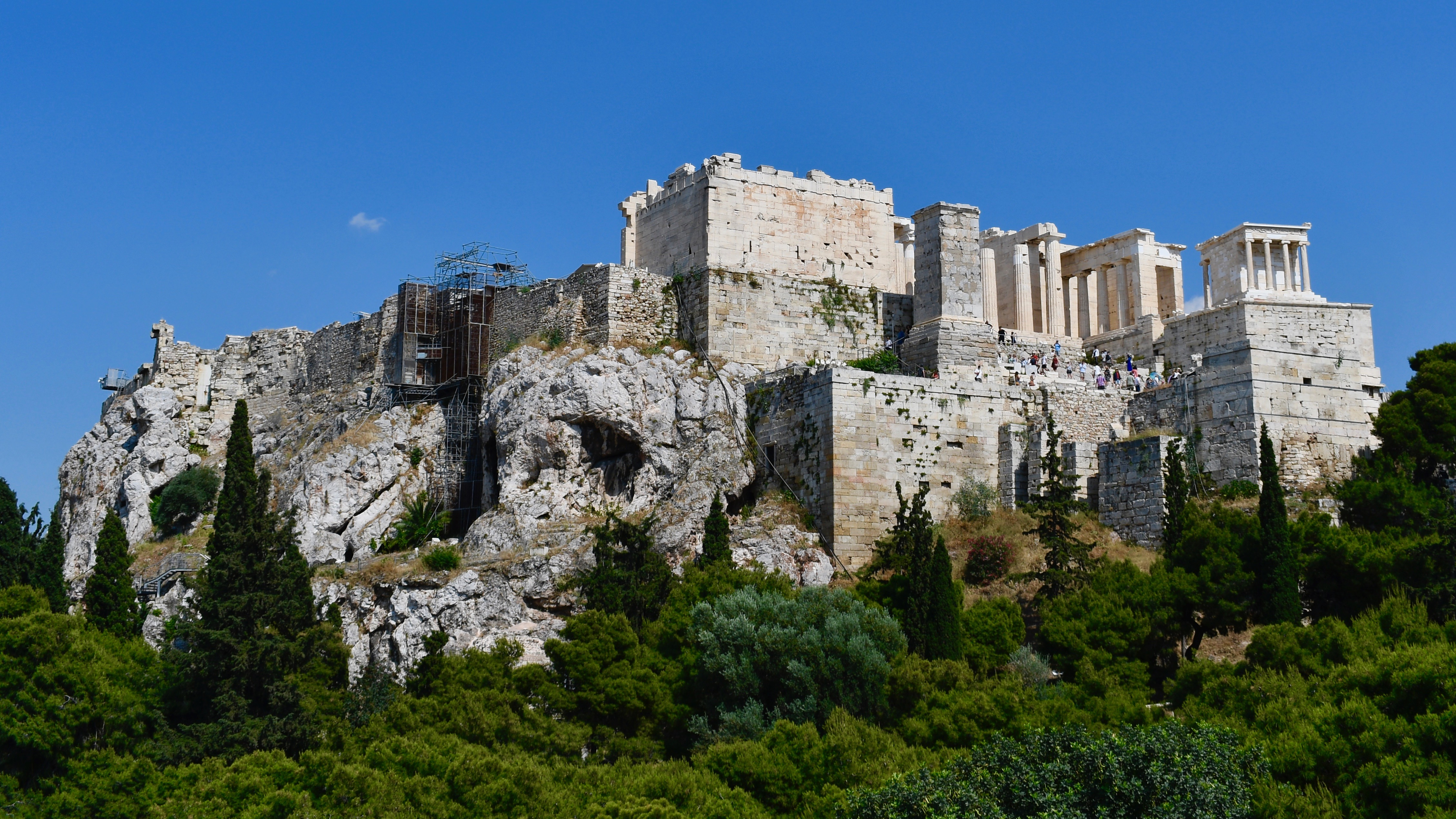
The Acropolis seen from the Areopagus

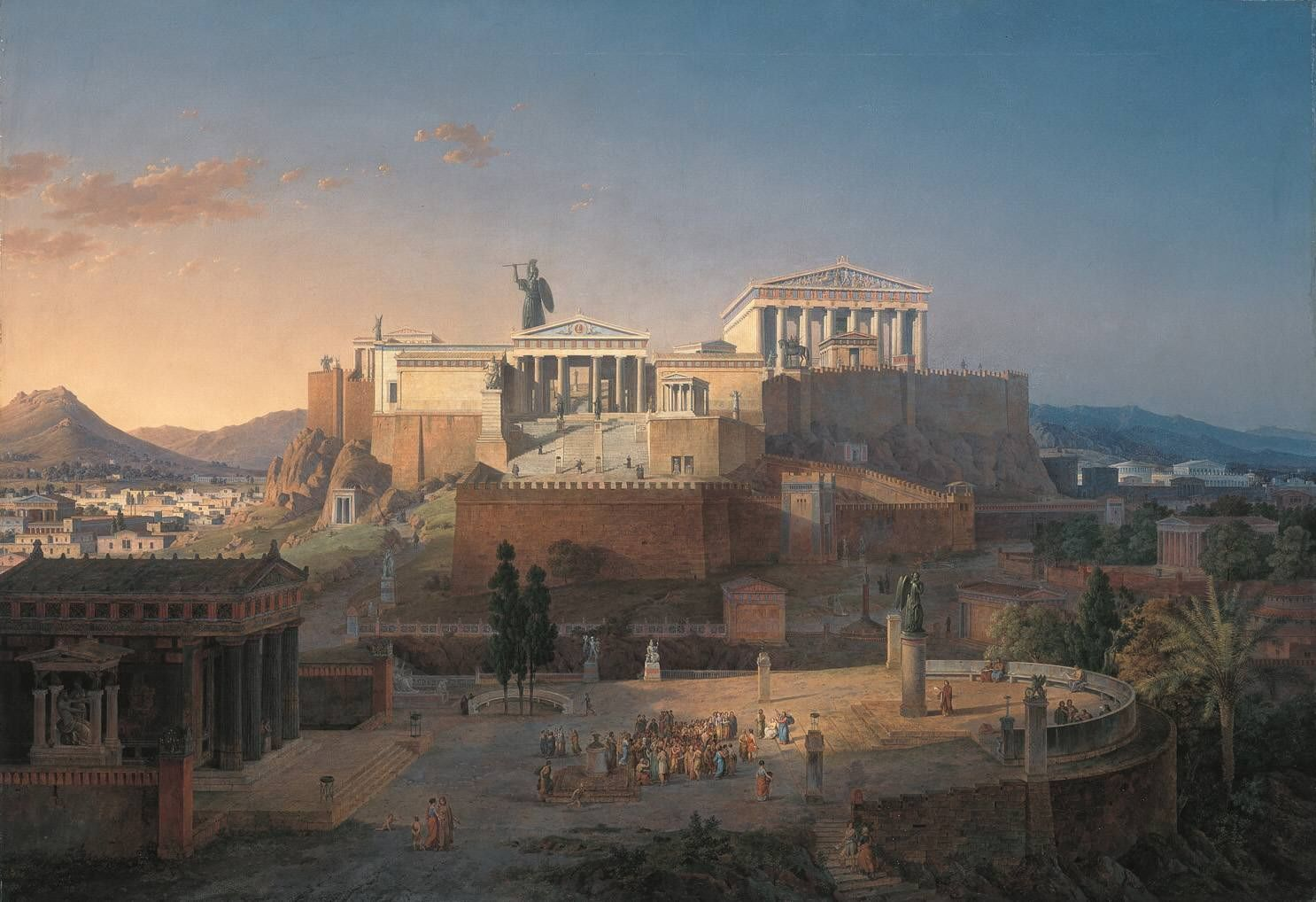
An idealized reconstruction of the Areopagus (front) and the Acropolis, Leo von Klenze, 1846.

The exact origin of the Areopagus as an institution remains unclear. In pre-classical times, before the 5th century BC, the Areopagus may have been a council of elders for the city of Athens, with membership restricted by constitutional conventions to those who had held high public office, in this case that of Archon. Conversely, it may have begun almost exclusively as a homicide court and judicial body. While there is no consensus, homicide trials seem to have been held by Athenians on the Areopagus hill as early as the 7th century BC and possibly as far back as the mid-8th century BC.

In 594 BC, the Areopagus Council was heavily restructured by Solon, as was the rest of the Athenian state apparatus. Aristotle suggests that Solon confirmed its competence over cases of treason (eisangelia, εἰσαγγελία) and its guardianship of the laws (nomophylakia, νομοφυλακία). Solon's entrusting of the nomophylakia to the Areopagus Council may imply that the council was invested with maintaining the stability of his reforms after he left Athens.

Under the reforms of Cleisthenes, enacted in 508/507 BC, the Boule (βουλή) or council was expanded from 400 to 500 men, and was formed of 50 men from each of the ten clans or phylai (φυλαί) of Attica. There is very little evidence to suggest that Cleisthenes may have altered the composition or the jurisdiction of the Areopagus Council, given that he himself was likely a council member.

Cleisthenes significantly influenced the Areopagus by establishing the Council of Five Hundred and implementing ostracism, which reduced aristocratic power and encouraged citizen involvement in governance. These reforms transformed the Areopagus into a judicial body, emphasizing justice within the democratic framework. By organizing citizens into demes, Cleisthenes further ensured broader representation, solidifying the Areopagus's role in Athenian democracy.

In 462/461 BC, Ephialtes may have put through reforms which deprived the Areopagus Council of almost all its functions — except that of a murder tribunal — in favour of the Heliaia. While this perception is corroborated by most ancient authors, it may have merely been a retrojection by those writing long after the 5th century BC. This is because there is little evidence to suggest that the Areopagus Council had done anything of note to warrant an attack on its powers by the time of Ephialtes. Nevertheless, over the course of the 5th century BC, the Areopagus Council did lose its competence over eisangelia and dokimasia (δοκιμασία), the initial examination of those elected into office, though it is unknown if this was because of Ephialtes.

In The Eumenides of Aeschylus (458 BC), the Areopagus is the site of the trial of Orestes for killing his mother Clytemnestra and her lover Aegisthus. While this is a dramatization of the trials that would have taken place at the Areopagus, it is the only surviving tragedy that closely resembles what Athenian citizens would recognize as a judicial proceeding. Most general happenings are the same but with a unique twist, such as the presiding officer being the goddess Athena and all prosecutors being female and divine as well. One notable inconsistency in this drama is that, in the fifth-century, Orestes would not have been tried at the Areopagus council since he was claiming to have killed his mother 'with justice', rather than asserting that he had not killed her. A case of this nature would instead come before the ephetai at the Delphinium.

In the second half of the 4th century BC, the Areopagus Court grew in influence and political power, and contributed to the anti-Macedonian faction in Athens. It conducted an investigation on charges of treason and bribery (apophasis, ἀπόφασις) against Demosthenes as a result of the Harpalus affair in 324 BC. At the same time, the Areopagus as an institution may have also regained power over the nomophylakia, which had been lost to reforms in the 5th century BC.

The Areopagus Council continued to function as a body of former archons in Roman times. After Sulla's capture of Athens in 86/87 BC and subsequent restructuring of the city's political structure, it was elevated to one of the most prestigious and politically powerful institutions in Athens. The Roman statesman Cicero once said of the council, "when one says 'the Athenian state is ruled by the council', the words 'of the Areopagus' are omitted."

Acts 17:16-34 prominently features the Areopagus as the setting for the Apostle Paul's Areopagus sermon during his visit to Athens, notably leading to the conversion of Dionysius the Areopagite. However, it is unclear whether Paul gave his speech before the Areopagus Council in the setting of a judicial investigation or trial, or on the physical location of the Areopagus hill as an informal speech. The Areopagus Council likely would not have met on the actual Areopagus hill by the time of Paul's visit, but rather in the agora or in the Stoa Basileios.

The Areopagus had ceased operation as a political council by at least the early 5th century AD, according to Theodoret of Cyrus.

After the closure of the council, the Areopagus hill was occupied by various houses and dwellings while under Byzantine rule. Buildings of note on the hill during this time included a church and monastery, both dedicated to Dionysius the Areopagite.

The term "Areopagus" also refers to the judicial body of aristocratic origin that subsequently formed the higher court of modern Greece.

Near the Areopagus was also constructed in the mid-19th century AD by the Roman Catholic Church the Cathedral Basilica of St. Dionysius the Areopagite.

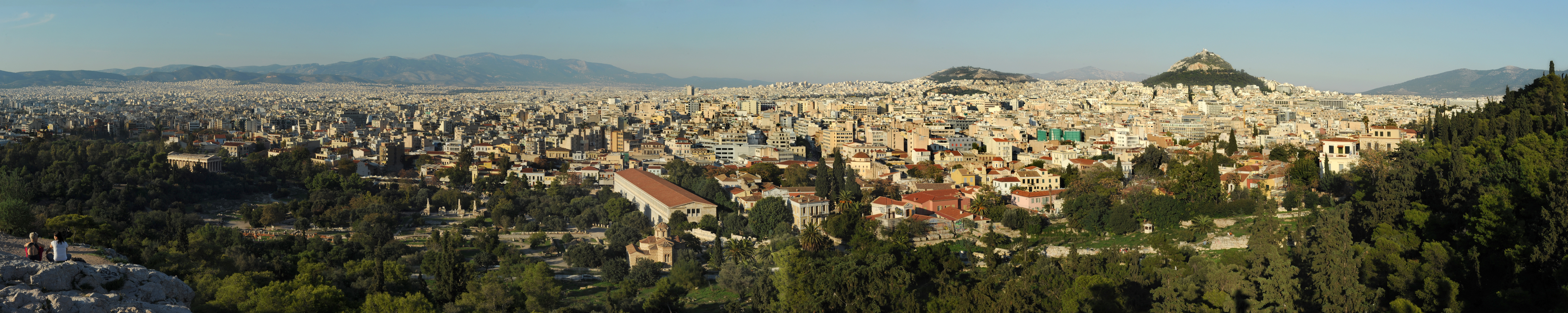
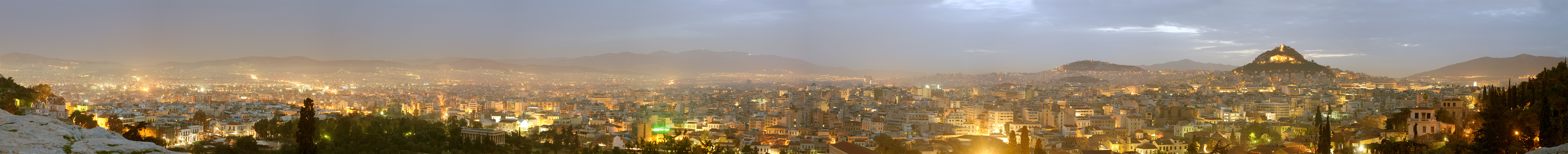

== Modern references ==
- The English poet John Milton titled his defence of freedom of the press "Areopagitica", arguing that the censors of ancient Athens, based at the Areopagus, had not practiced the kind of prior restraint of publication being called for in the English Parliament of Milton's time.
- The Areopagus Society, formed in 1893, is one of the oldest clubs at the preparatory Hotchkiss School, Connecticut, USA, and meets to debate on certain topics.
- "Areopagus" is the title of the second poem in Irish poet Louis MacNeice's 1952 collection, Ten Burnt Offerings.

== See also ==
- Areopagus of Eastern Continental Greece, a regional Greek administration during the Greek Revolution of 1821, which was named after the Ancient Athenian institution.
