= Boule (ancient Greece) =

Ancient Greek city council

In cities of ancient Greece, the boule (Ancient Greek: βουλή; pl.: boulai, βουλαί) was a council (βουλευταί, bouleutai) appointed to run daily affairs of the city. Originally a council of nobles advising a king, boulai evolved according to the constitution of the city: In oligarchies boule positions might have been hereditary, while in democracies members were typically chosen by lot and served for one year. Little is known about the workings of many boulai, except in the case of Athens, for which extensive material has survived.

== Athenian boule ==
The original council of Athens was the Areopagus. It consisted of ex-archons and was aristocratic in character.

=== Solonian boule ===
The Athenian boule under Solon heard appeals from the most important decisions of the courts. Its members were elected 100 per tribe (the Hopletes, the Aigikoreis, the Argadeis, and the Geleontes), mounting up to 400 members. Anyone who wasn't from the aforementioned tribes couldn't elect or be elected. The higher governmental posts, archons (magistrates), were reserved for citizens of the top two income groups.

=== Cleisthenes' boule (after 508 BC) ===
Following the Athenian Revolution in 508 BC Cleisthenes formed a new government of Athens through a series of reforms. In strengthening the common Athenian identity Cleisthenes devised an artificial political division of Athens into ten tribes. The tribes would each include local demes from three different types of areas; the city trittys, the coastal trittys and inland trittys. The institution of the boule was reformed accordingly and would now be a council of 500 male citizens. Each of the ten tribes supplied 50 men to the council with each of the 50 adhering from its constituting demes and distributed according to the size of their population. Under Cleisthenes, the boule attained renewed political power as responsible for the agenda-setting of the legislative body of the Assembly (ekklesia) as well as the formal execution of the political decisions taken in the Assembly. The council was responsible for about half of the decrees ratified by the Assembly. The boule met every day except for festival days and ill-omened days. According to Aristotle, Cleisthenes introduced the bouleutic oath.

==== Selection process ====
Members of the Council under Cleisthenes were selected by lot. Not all citizens, however, were in the selection pool when selecting members by lot from each deme. Only male citizens age 30 or above and with no criminal charges, who had put themselves forward would be available for selection. Additionally, membership was restricted at this time to the top three of the original four property classes (the pentacosiomedimni, hippeis and zeugitae, but not the thetes). This restriction, though never officially changed, fell out of practice by the middle of the 5th century BC.

==== Accountability and responsiveness ====
The boule had a number of safeguarding principles that secured the accountability and responsiveness of the council to the larger public. Three of the main mechanisms in place were; monitoring by other governing institutions including the assembly (ekklesia) and the courts, the required rendering of a full account of the work undertaken upon leaving the council and not least the ability of the general citizenry and fellow council members to charge individual members with a vote of no confidence.

Members served for one year and no man could serve more than twice in his life, nor more than once a decade. The leadership of the boule (the prytany) rotated between the tribe delegations and a new prytany was chosen every month by lot. The man in charge of prytany was replaced every day from among the 50 members again chosen by lot.

=== Ephialtes' boule (after 461 BC) ===
After the reforms of Ephialtes and Pericles in the mid-5th century BC, the boule took on many of the administrative and judicial functions of the Areopagus, which retained its traditional right to try homicide cases. It supervised the state's finances, navy, cavalry, sacred matters, building and shipping matters and care for invalids and orphans. Its own members staffed many boards that oversaw the finer points of these many administrative duties. It undertook the examination of public officials both before and after leaving office (most offices lasting one year) to ensure honest accounting and loyalty to the state. It heard some cases of impeachment of public officials for high crimes and mismanagement or serious dereliction of duties. At some point in the late 5th century, pay was instituted for those serving in the boule; this may have been a way to encourage poorer citizens to volunteer, who would otherwise be reluctant to serve. The boule was considered the cornerstone of the democratic constitution, providing a locus for day-to-day activities and holding together the many disparate administrative functions of the government. Because of the rotation of members, it was assumed that the boule was free from the domination of factions of any kind, although there is some evidence that richer citizens served out of proportion to poorer citizens. This may be due to the heavy investment of time required, time that poorer citizens would not have had to spare.

== Boulai in other Greek states ==
=== Kingdom of Macedonia ===
In the Macedonian Kingdom, and later the Macedonian Empire, the body that assisted the king with running the kingdom was called the synedrion, literally translated as "The Congress". This tradition continued to be in use in the years of Alexander the Great and its members were hereditary. Although not democratic, the members of the Synedrion, including the king, were considered equal to one another and had the right of the freedom of speech.

=== Corinth ===
The League of Corinth was a federation of Greek states created by king Philip II of Macedon during the winter of 338/337 BC to facilitate his use of unified Greek military forces in his war against Achaemenid Persia. The league guaranteed, among other things, that member states' constitutions in force at the time of joining were guaranteed and that a Synedrion, or congress of representatives, was to meet at Corinth.

=== Epirus ===
The Epirus, which became a federal republic in 231 BC, was ruled by the "Synedrion", or "The Congress". The Synedrion was dissolved when the Epirote federation fell apart due to internal upheaval during the Third Macedonian War.

== Modern Greece ==
The name "boule", pronounced as Vouli in Modern Greek, is preserved in the Parliament of modern Greece; either as the name of the lower house of a bicameral parliament in 1844–1864 and 1927–1935, or the name of the unicameral Parliament in 1864–1927, 1935–1941, 1944–1967, and 1974–today.

== Sources ==
- Aristotle. Constitution of Athens 4.3, 46.1, 62.3.
- Hignett, Charles. A History of the Athenian Constitution. Oxford: Clarendon Press, 1958.
- Jones, A.H.M. Athenian Democracy. Oxford: Basil Blackwell, 1957.
- Mitchell, John Malcolm (1911). "Boulē" . Encyclopædia Britannica. Vol. 4 (11th ed.). pp. 320–321.
- Rhodes, P.J. The Athenian Boule. Oxford: The Clarendon Press, 1972.
- Struble, Robert, Jr. Treatise on Twelve Lights, Chapter Six, "Ancient Greece".
