= Trial of Socrates =

399 B.C. legal proceedings by the city of Athens against Socrates

The Trial of Socrates
- Decided: 399 BC
- Verdict: Guilty
- Charge: Failing to acknowledge the gods that the city acknowledges; Corruption of the Youth
- Citations: Plato; Xenophon; Diogenes Laertius

Case history
- Subsequent action: Socrates sentenced to death

Court membership
- Judge sitting: 501 +/- jury members in Athens

Case opinions
- 280 jurors found the defendant guilty while 221 found him innocent

The Trial of Socrates (399 BC) was held to determine the philosopher's guilt of two charges against the city of Athens: asebeia (impiety) and corruption of the youth. The accusers cited two impious acts: "failing to acknowledge the gods of the city" and "introducing new deities".

The death sentence of Socrates was the legal consequence of asking politico-philosophic questions of his students, which resulted in the two accusations of moral corruption and impiety. At trial, the majority of the dikasts (male-citizen jurors chosen by lot) voted to convict him of the two charges; then, consistent with common legal practice, they voted to determine his punishment and agreed to a sentence of death to be executed by Socrates's drinking a poisonous beverage of hemlock.

His students offer accounts of the trial and execution in the Apology of Socrates by Plato, the Apology of Socrates to the Jury by Xenophon, and Xenophon's Memorabilia. Modern interpretations include The Trial of Socrates (1988) by the journalist I. F. Stone, Why Socrates Died: Dispelling the Myths (2009) by the Classics scholar Robin Waterfield, and The Shadows of Socrates: The Heresy, War, and Treachery behind the Trial of Socrates (2024) by the scholar Matt Gatton.

== Background ==
Before the philosopher Socrates was tried for moral corruption and impiety, the citizens of Athens knew him as an intellectual and moral gadfly of their society. In the comic play, The Clouds (423 BC), Aristophanes represents Socrates as a sophistic philosopher who teaches the young man Pheidippides how to formulate arguments that justify striking and beating his father. Despite Socrates denying he had any relation with the Sophists, the playwright indicates that Athenians associated the philosophic teachings of Socrates with Sophism. As philosophers, the Sophists were considered by some in the era to be men of ambiguous reputation; in the words of one contemporary commentator, "they were [seen as] a set of charlatans that appeared in Greece in the fifth century BC, and earned ample livelihood by imposing on public credulity: professing to teach virtue, they really taught the art of fallacious discourse, and meanwhile propagated immoral practical doctrines."

Besides The Clouds, the comic play The Wasps (422 BC) also depicts inter-generational conflict, between an older man and a young man. Such representations of inter-generational social conflict among the men of Athens, especially in the decade from 425 to 415 BC, can reflect contrasting positions regarding opposition to or support for the Athenian invasion of Sicily. Many Athenians blamed the teachings of the Sophists and of Socrates for instilling the younger generation with a morally nihilistic, disrespectful attitude towards their society.

Socrates left no written works; however, his student and friend, Plato, wrote Socratic dialogues, featuring Socrates as the protagonist. As a teacher, competing intellectuals resented Socrates's elenctic examination method for intellectual inquiry, because its questions threatened their credibility as men of wisdom and virtue.

It has sometimes been claimed that Socrates described himself as the "gadfly" of Athens which, like a sluggish horse, needed to be aroused by his "stinging". In the Greek text of his defense given by Plato, Socrates never actually uses that term (viz., "gadfly" [Grk., oîstros]) to describe himself. Rather, his reference is merely allusive, as he (literally) says only that he has attached himself to the City (proskeimenon tē polei) in order to sting it. Nevertheless, he does make the bold claim that he is a god's gift to the Athenians.

Socrates's elenctic method was often imitated by the young men of Athens.

=== Association with Alcibiades and the Thirty Tyrants ===
Alcibiades was an Athenian general who had been the main proponent of the disastrous Sicilian Expedition during the Peloponnesian Wars, where virtually the entire Athenian invading force of more than 50,000 soldiers and non-combatants (e.g., the rowers of the Triremes) was killed or captured and enslaved. He was a student and close friend of Socrates, and his messmate during the siege of Potidaea (433–429 BC). Socrates remained Alcibiades's close friend, admirer, and mentor for about five or six years.

His complex friendship with Socrates was put on display during Alcibiades's speech at the Symposium, where he both praised Socrates and also disclosed his emotional turmoil and humiliation because of his personal desires. Alcibiades accused Socrates of arrogance during what he framed as a "trial", using the audience as a jury to judge Socrates's pride. Yet, Socrates remained silent, demonstrating the self-control that challenged Alcibiades's values. Alcibiades admitted this created an inner conflict, as Socrates's teachings inspired a shift in thinking toward focusing on one's inner character over their outward success. In this way, the "first trial" of Socrates serves as a powerful metaphor for the philosophical and personal challenges he posed to the traditional Athenian values, foreshadowing the tensions that would later lead to his formal trial.

Another possible source of resentment were the political views that he and his associates were thought to have embraced. Critias, who appears in two of Plato's Socratic dialogues, was a leader of the Thirty Tyrants (the ruthless oligarchic regime that ruled Athens, as puppets of Sparta and backed by Spartan troops, for eight months in 404–403 BC until they were overthrown). Several of the Thirty had been students of Socrates, but there is also a record of their falling out.

As with many of the issues surrounding Socrates's conviction, the nature of his affiliation with the Thirty Tyrants is far from straightforward. During the reign of the Thirty, many prominent Athenians who were opposed to the new government left Athens. Robin Waterfield asserts that "Socrates would have been welcome in oligarchic Thebes, where he had close associates among the Pythagoreans who flourished there, and which had already taken in other exiles." Given the availability of a hospitable host outside of Athens, Socrates, at least in a limited way, chose to remain in Athens. Thus, Waterfield suggests, Socrates's contemporaries probably thought his remaining in Athens, even without participating in the Thirty's bloodthirsty schemes, demonstrated his sympathy for the Thirty's cause, not neutrality towards it. This is proved, Waterfield argues, by the fact that after the Thirty were no longer in power, anyone who had remained in Athens during their rule was encouraged to move to Eleusis, the new home of the expatriate Thirty. Socrates did oppose the will of the Thirty on one documented occasion. Plato's Apology has the character of Socrates describe that the Thirty ordered him, along with four other men, to fetch a man named Leon of Salamis so that the Thirty could execute him. While Socrates did not obey this order, he did nothing to warn Leon, who was subsequently apprehended by the other four men.

=== Support of oligarchic rule and contempt for Athenian democracy ===
According to the portraits left by some of Socrates's followers, Socrates himself seems to have openly espoused certain anti-democratic views, the most prominent perhaps being the view that it is not majority opinion that yields correct policy but rather genuine knowledge and professional competence, which is possessed by only a few. Plato also portrays him as being severely critical of some of the most prominent and well-respected leaders of the Athenian democracy; and even has his claim that the officials selected by the Athenian system of governance cannot credibly be regarded as benefactors since it is not any group of many that benefits, but only "someone or very few persons". Finally, Socrates was known as often praising the laws of the undemocratic regimes of Sparta and Crete. Plato himself reinforced anti-democratic ideas in The Republic, advocating rule by elite, enlightened "Philosopher-Kings".

The totalitarian Thirty Tyrants had anointed themselves as the elite, and in the minds of his Athenian accusers, Socrates was guilty because he was suspected of introducing oligarchic ideas to them. Larry Gonick, in his "Cartoon History of the Universe" wrote:

The trial of Socrates has always seemed mysterious ... the charges sound vague and unreal ... because behind the stated charges was Socrates's real crime: preaching a philosophy that produced Alcibiades and Critias ... but of course he couldn't be prosecuted for that under the amnesty [which had been declared after the overthrow of the Thirty Tyrants] ... so his accusers made it "not believing the Gods of the city, introducing new gods, and corrupting the youth".

Apart from his views on politics, Socrates held unusual views on religion. He made several references to his spirit, or daimonion, although he explicitly claimed that it never urged him on, but only warned him against various prospective actions.

== Historical descriptions of the trial ==
The extant, primary sources about the history of the trial and execution of Socrates are: the Apology of Socrates to the Jury, by Xenophon, a historian and philosopher; and the tetralogy of Socratic dialogues – Euthyphro, the Socratic Apology, Crito, and Phaedo, by Plato, a philosopher who had been a student of Socrates.

In The Indictment of Socrates (392 BC), the sophist rhetorician Polycrates (440–370) presents the prosecution speech by Anytus, which condemned Socrates for his political and religious activities in Athens before the year 403 BC. In presenting such a prosecution, which addressed matters external to the specific charges of moral corruption and impiety levelled by the Athenian polis against Socrates, Anytus violated the political amnesty specified in the agreement of reconciliation (403–402 BC), which granted pardon to a man for political and religious actions taken before or during the rule of the Thirty Tyrants, "under which all further charges and official recriminations concerning the [reign of] terror were forbidden".

Moreover, the legal and religious particulars against Socrates that Polycrates reported in The Indictment of Socrates are addressed in the replies by Xenophon and the sophist Libanius of Antioch (314–390).

== Trial ==
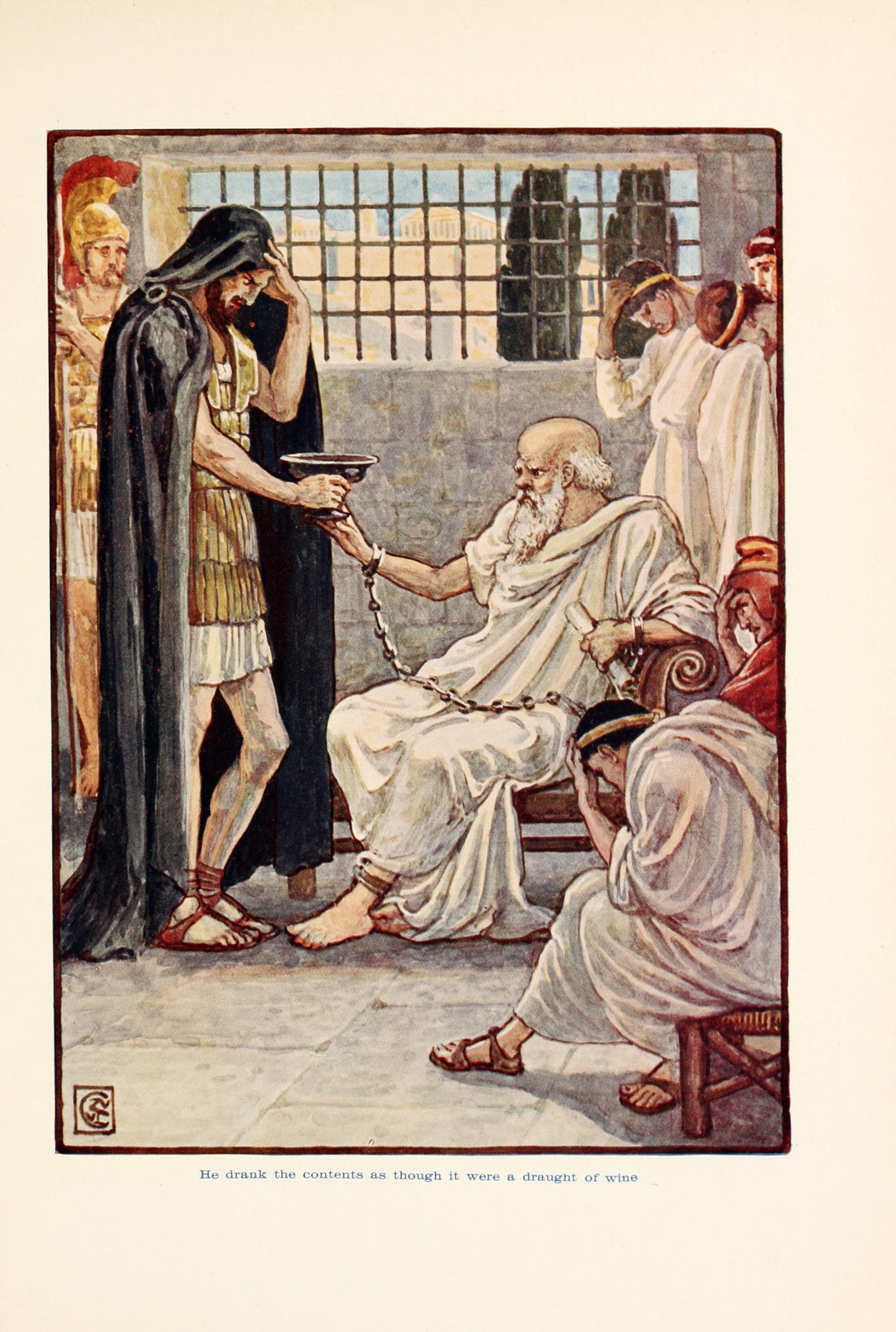
The Death of Socrates (399 BC): He drank the contents as though it were a draught of wine.

The formal accusation was the second element of the trial of Socrates, which the accuser, Meletus, swore to be true, before the archon (a state officer with mostly religious duties) who considered the evidence and determined that there was an actionable case of "moral corruption of Athenian youth" and "impiety", for which the philosopher must legally answer; the archon summoned Socrates for a trial by jury.

Athenian juries were drawn by lottery, from a group of hundreds of male-citizen volunteers; such a great jury usually ensuring a majority verdict in a trial. Although neither Plato nor Xenophon of Athens states the number of jurors, a jury of 501 men was probably the legal norm. In the Apology of Socrates (36a–b), about Socrates's defence at trial, Plato said that if just 30 of the votes had been cast differently, Socrates would have been acquitted (36a), and that (perhaps) less than three-fifths of the jury voted against him (36b). Assuming a jury of 501, this would imply that he was convicted by a majority of 280 against 221. The citizens were in a state of fear because of the past war and plagues, and feared to anger their gods again because of Socrates, which can help to understand the state of mind of some of the jurors when they gave their verdict.

After Socrates had been found guilty of corruption and impiety, he and the prosecutor suggested sentences for crimes against the city-state of Athens. Expressing surprise at the few votes required for an acquittal, Socrates joked that he be punished with free meals at the Prytaneum (the city's sacred hearth), an honour usually held for a benefactor of Athens, and the victorious athletes of an Olympiad. After that failed suggestion, Socrates then offered to pay a fine of 100 drachmae – one-fifth of his property – a largesse that testified to his integrity and poverty as a philosopher. Finally, a fine of 3,000 drachmae was agreed, proposed by Plato, Crito, Critobulus, and Apollodorus, who guaranteed payment. Nonetheless, the prosecutor at the trial proposed the death penalty for the impious philosopher. (Diogenes Laërtius, 2.42). In the end, the sentence of death was passed by a greater majority than the majority by which he had been convicted.

Friends, followers, and students encouraged Socrates to flee Athens, which the citizens expected that he would do. However, Socrates refused to flout the law and evade his legal responsibility to Athens on principle (see: Crito). Consequently, faithful to his teaching of civic obedience to the law, the 70-year-old Socrates executed his own death sentence and drank the hemlock, in accordance with his sentence. (See: Phaedo)

== Death ==
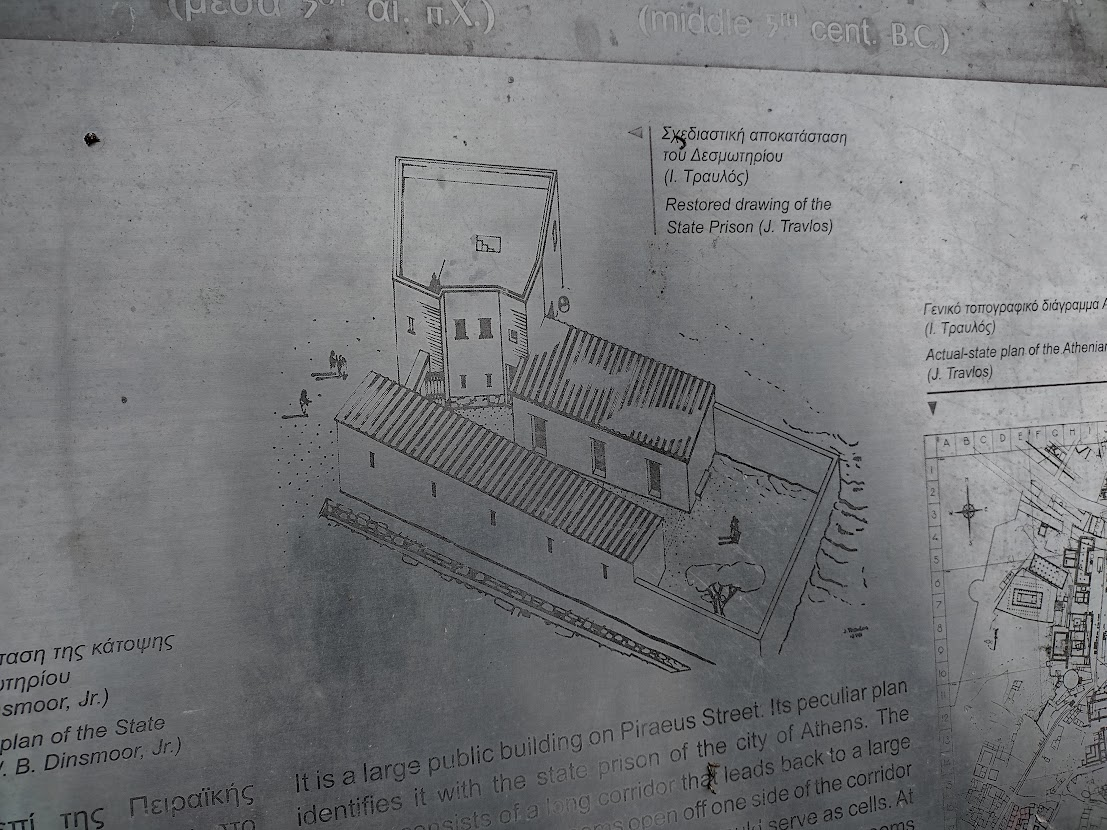
A presentation of the possible appearance of the state prison in ancient Athens.

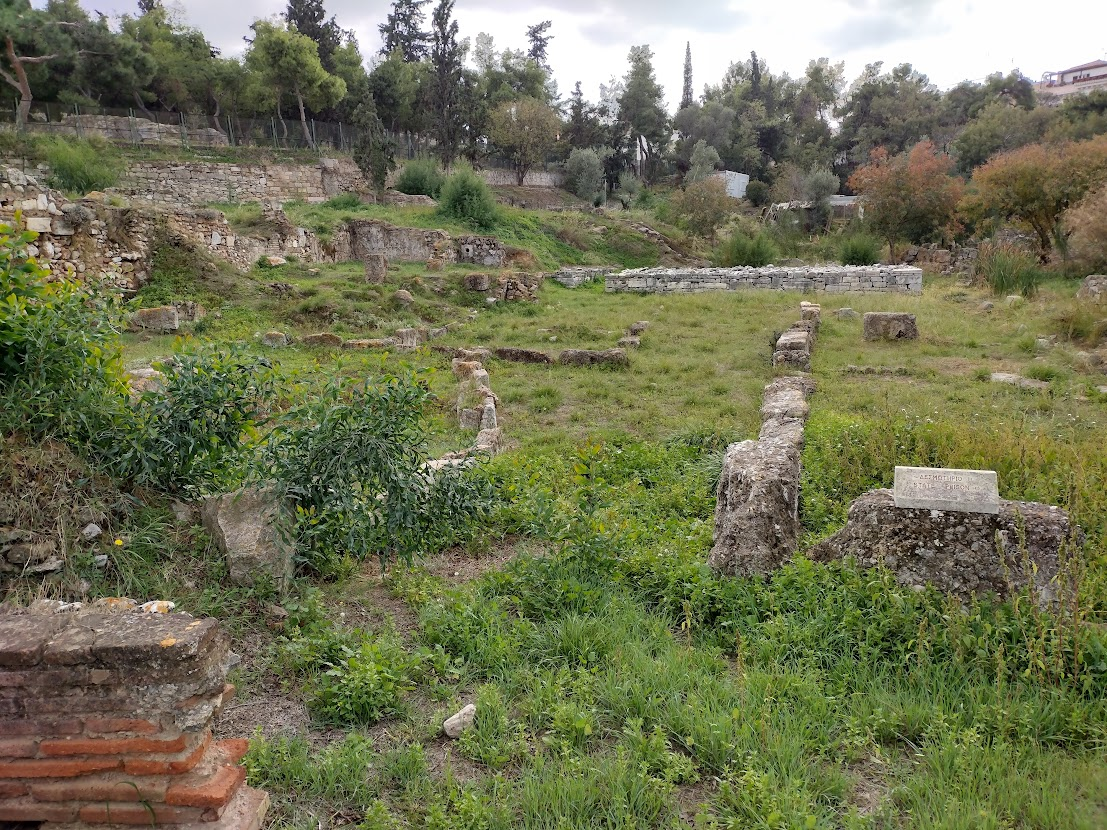
The site of the state prison in Ancient Athens.

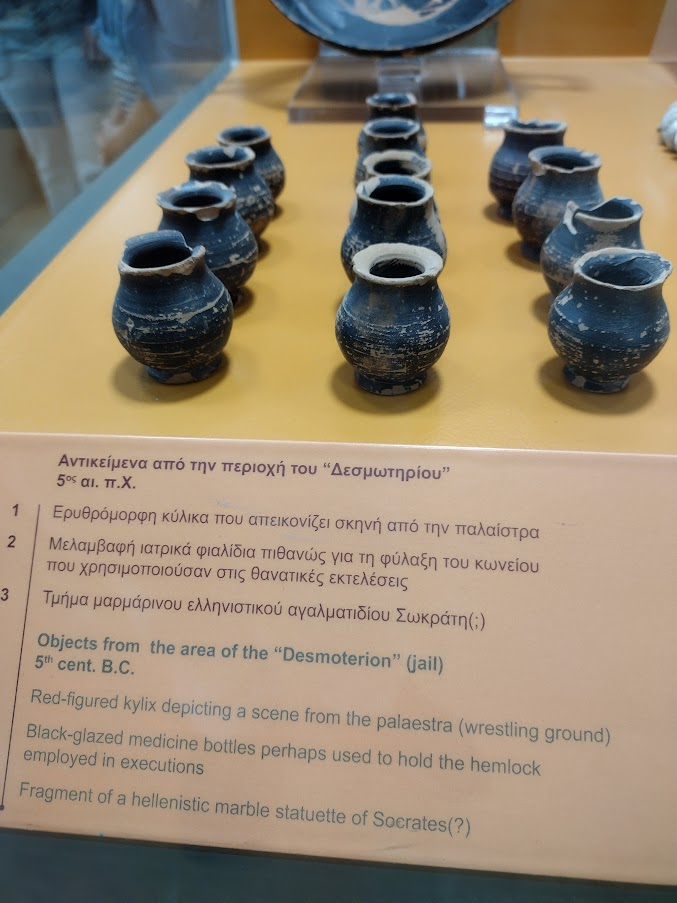
The small cups found in the drains of the prison, believed to be used for administering the poison for executions.

The death of Socrates is presented in the Platonic diaologue the Phaedo, in which Socrates and his friends discuss the immortality of the soul before Socrates drinks the hemlock poison given to him for his execution.

In the Phaedo the poison given to Socrates is not identified by name, but is called τὸ φάρμακον (to pharmakon), "the drug". Because of this and the differences in symptoms between various species called κώνειον (kōneion, hemlock in Greek) or cicūta (hemlock in Latin) the identification of poison hemlock as the plant used in the execution has been the subject of debate.

In 1679 the Swiss physician Johann Jakob Wepfer published Cicutae aquaticae historia et noxae. In it he describes the symptoms of eight children who had eaten the roots of water hemlock. He expressed doubts that hemlock could have been the "cold" poison used in the execution of Socrates as the symptoms were of a "hot" poison with seizures, arched backs, and foaming at the mouth. Wepfer was unaware that the Cicuta he was studying was not the same plant used in Athenian executions.

The English physician and botanist John Harley worked with a preparation of hemlock called succus conii, testing it on himself and recording the effects in his book The Old Vegetable Neurotics published in 1869. The symptoms he recorded were identical to the initial stages described in the Phaedo.

An hour and a quarter after taking the dose, I first felt decided weakness in my legs. The giddiness and diminution of motor power continued to increase for the next fifteen minutes. An hour and a half after taking the dose, these effects attained their maximum; and at this time I was cold, pale, and tottering. ... The mind remained perfectly clear and calm, and the brain active throughout; but the body seemed heavy, and well-nigh asleep.

In the Phaedo:

...and he walked about until, as he said, his legs began to fail, and then he lay on his back, according to the directions, and the man who gave him the poison now and then looked at his feet and legs; and after a while he pressed his foot hard and asked him if he could feel; and he said, no; and then his leg, and so upwards and upwards, and showed us that he was cold and stiff. And he felt them himself, and said: When the poison reaches the heart, that will be the end. He was beginning to grow cold about the groin, when he uncovered his face, for he had covered himself up, and said (they were his last words)—he said: Crito, I owe a cock to Asclepius; will you remember to pay the debt? The debt shall be paid, said Crito; is there anything else? There was no answer to this question; but in a minute or two a movement was heard, and the attendants uncovered him; his eyes were set, and Crito closed his eyes and mouth.

In the 1970s the accuracy of the description was questioned by the classicist Christopher Gill and the pathologist William Ober. Gill argued that the scene was adjusted by Plato to present, either for dramatic or philosophic purposes, a quiet and dignified end. He wrote, "The quietness, the calmness, the regularity of the effects of the penetration of the poison into Socrates's body (so different from the chaos, squalor, and collapse described by Nicander and modern toxicologies) is the quietness of a ritual, the katharmos or purification of the soul from the prison of the body." In the early 2000s, Enid Bloch's paper reviewing the available evidence concluded that these arguments resulted from confusion between different species commonly called hemlock.

== Interpretations of the trial of Socrates ==
=== Ancient ===
In the time of the trial of Socrates, the year 399 BC, the city-state of Athens recently had endured the trials and tribulations of Spartan hegemony and the 13-month régime of the Thirty Tyrants, which had been imposed consequently to the Athenian defeat in the Peloponnesian War (431–404 BC). At the request of Lysander, a Spartan admiral, the thirty men, led by Critias and Theramenes, were to administer Athens and revise the city's democratic laws, which were inscribed on a wall of the Stoa Basileios. Their actions were to facilitate the transition of the Athenian government from a democracy to an oligarchy in service to Sparta.

Moreover, the Thirty Tyrants also appointed a council of 500 men to perform the judicial functions that once had belonged to every Athenian citizen. In their brief régime, the pro-Spartan oligarchs killed about five percent of the Athenian population, confiscated much property, and exiled democrats from the city proper. The fact that Critias, leader of the Thirty Tyrants, had been a pupil of Socrates was held against him.

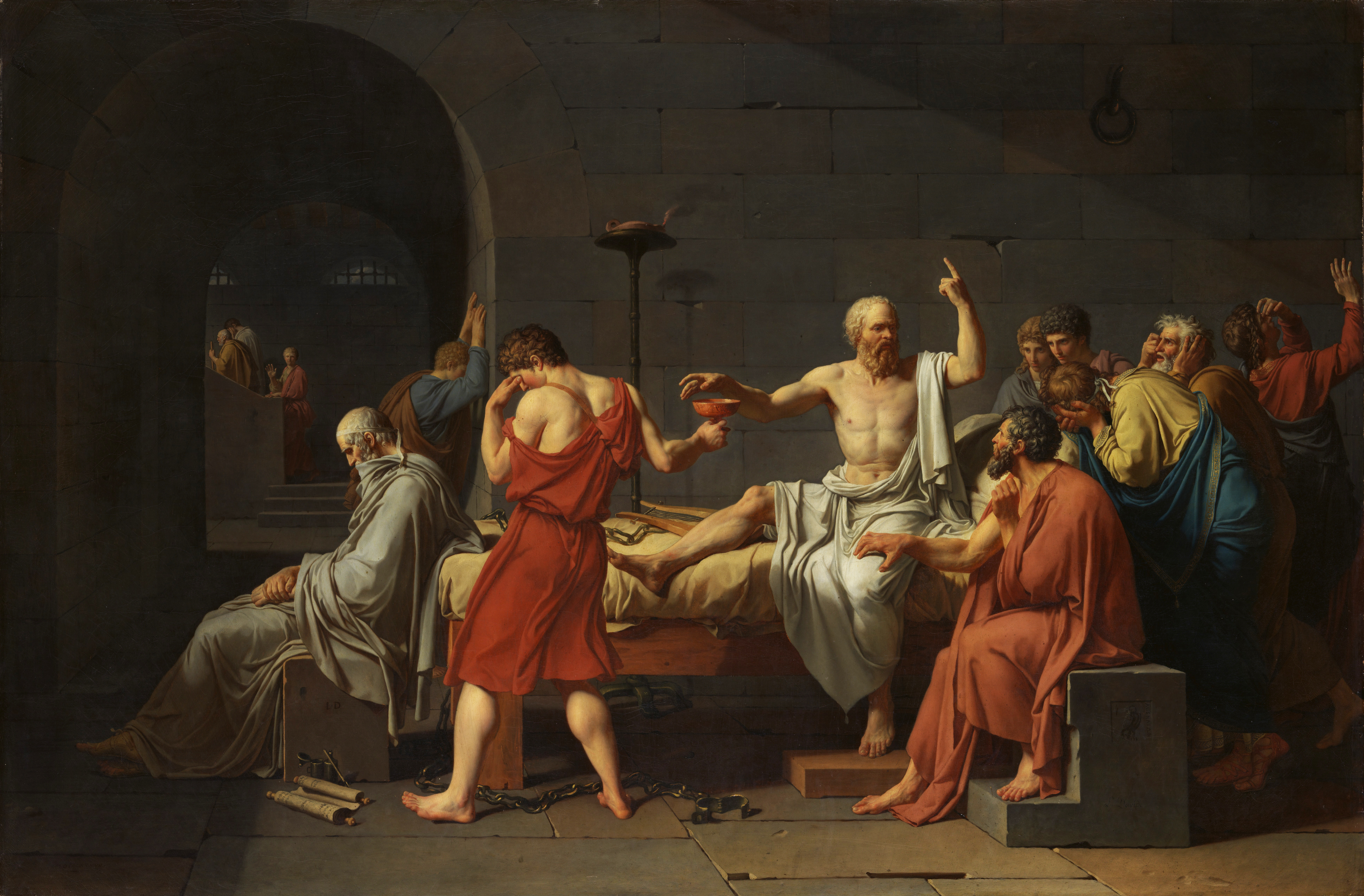
The Death of Socrates (1787), by Jacques-Louis David

Plato's presentation of the trial and death of Socrates inspired writers, artists, and philosophers to revisit the matter. For some, the execution of the man whom Plato called "the wisest and most just of all men" demonstrated the defects of democracy and of popular rule; for others, the Athenian actions were a justifiable defence of the recently re-established democracy.

Roman emperor and philosopher Marcus Aurelius wrote of Socrates' death in his work Meditations and criticized those who caused Socrates' death implying that those who caused his death were "lice". Philosopher and Roman statesman Cicero, asserted that he believed that he lost his trial due to him being a poor rhetorician.

In 73 AD, Syrian Stoic philosopher Mara bar Serapion wrote of the death of the "three wise men", which included Pythagoras, "the wise king" of the Jews, and Socrates. Serapion criticized the treatment of each of them as unjust and oppressive.

=== Modern ===
I. F. Stone argued in The Trial of Socrates (1988), that Socrates wanted to be sentenced to death, to justify his philosophic opposition to the Athenian democracy of that time, and because, as a man, he saw that old age would be an unpleasant time for him.

Andrew David Irvine claimed in the introduction to his play Socrates on Trial (2007) that Socrates willingly accepted the guilty verdict by the jurors because of his loyalty to Athenian democracy:

During a time of war, and great social and intellectual upheaval, Socrates felt compelled to express his views, openly, regardless of the consequences. As a result, he is remembered today, not only for his sharp wit and high ethical standards, but also for his loyalty to the view that, in a democracy, the best way for a man to serve himself, his friends, and his city – even during times of war – is by being loyal to, and by speaking publicly about the truth.

Robin Waterfield wrote in Why Socrates Died: Dispelling the Myths (2009) that the death of Socrates was an act of volition motivated by a greater purpose; Socrates "saw himself as healing the City's ills by his voluntary death". Waterfield wrote that Socrates, with his unconventional methods of intellectual enquiry, attempted to resolve the political confusion then occurring in the city-state of Athens, by willingly being the scapegoat, whose death would quiet old disputes, which then would allow the Athenian polis to progress towards political harmony and social peace.

In The New Trial of Socrates (2012), an international panel of ten judges held a mock re-trial of Socrates to resolve the matter of the charges levelled against him by Meletus, Anytus, and Lycon, that: "Socrates is a doer of evil and corrupter of the youth, and he does not believe in the gods of the state, and he believes in other new divinities of his own". Five judges voted guilty and five judges voted not guilty. Limiting themselves to the facts of the case against Socrates, the judges did not consider any sentence, but the judges who voted the philosopher guilty said that they would not have considered the death penalty for him.

In The Shadows of Socrates: The Heresy, War, and Treachery behind the Trial of Socrates (2024), Matt Gatton offered a new perspective on the trial, based on his reconstruction archeological work that was published in the Oxford Handbook of Light in Archeology (2022). Gatton asserts that the impiety charge against Socrates stemmed from his searing critique of Athens's most hallowed religious ritual—the Mysteries of Eleusis. He writes: "Trying to explain what happened to Socrates without talking about the Mysteries of Eleusis is like trying to explain what happened to Galileo without mentioning the Catholic Church." Gatton agrees with prior authors that the corrupting the youth charge was the result of the ruinous actions of several of Socrates's former students, most pointedly Alcibiades and Critias, but Gatton sees Alcibiades's alleged profanation of the Mysteries of Eleusis as a significant factor. In this respect, both of the charges against Socrates are tied back to the same source.

== See also ==
- Meno & Phaedo
- "The unexamined life is not worth living"
- Areopagus
