= Socrates (1970 film) =

1970 film

- Directed by: Roberto Rossellini
- Written by: Jean-Dominique de La Rochefoucauld; Marcella Mariani; Renzo Rossellini; Roberto Rossellini
- Screenplay by: Roberto Rossellini, Marcella Mariani
- Produced by: Renzo Rossellini
- Cinematography: Jorge H. Martín
- Edited by: Alfredo Muschietti
- Music by: Mario Nascimbene
- Production company: Orizzonte 2000, RAI
- Release date: 1970
- Running time: 120 minutes
- Countries: Spain, Italy, France
- Language: Italian

Socrates is a 1970 Spanish-Italian-French television film directed by Roberto Rossellini. The film is an adaptation of several Plato dialogues, including The Apology, Euthyphro, Crito, and Phaedo.

== Plot ==
The film tells the personal and historical events of the last period of the life of Socrates, the famous Athenian philosopher. The historical background is the period of the decay of the Greek Polis and of the democracy of Athens: the opening scene shows the demolition of the city walls by the Spartans, now victors of the Peloponnesian War, with the subsequent establishment of the Government of the Thirty Tyrants (404 BC).

The city is in turmoil for the defeat and humiliation suffered, as well as for the organization of military counter-moves for the liberation (which will lead to the fall of the Thirty the year following the establishment of the Regime). In this context it is introduced the character of Socrates, now seventy years old and engaged every day in his philosophical research with a large following of young people.

During the film many excerpts from some of Plato's famous Dialogues are presented, including Hippias major, Euthyphron, Republic, Crito, Socrates' Apology and Phaedo. There are also some explicit quotations, by a detractor of Socrates, of The Clouds, the comedy of Aristophanes in which the philosopher is described as a scoundrel, expert in sophisms and rhetoric, able to always make the unjust cause just.

These references contribute to outline the thought and philosophy of Socrates: the awareness of one's ignorance as a necessary prerequisite for the search for truth; the Socratic method that uses dialogue as a means for philosophical investigation; irony and maieutics as moments of the dialogue itself; the importance of virtue in achieving happiness; contempt for money, power and other material values; the opposition to the Sophists and their abuse of rhetoric as an instrument to flaunt a false wisdom; the criticism of the validity of the writings.

In the background is the reconstruction of his family and economic situation: the philosopher lives in poverty with his three children and his wife, Xanthippe, a shrewish woman with hysterical attitudes, continually critical of her husband. who does not provide for the maintenance of the family and the house, intent only on his philosophical investigation which she considered a useless waste of time.

The aforementioned historical and political events, however, determine the decay of democracy in Athens even after the expulsion of the Thirty Tyrants. The Athenians, upset by the events, are less and less democratic, mentally open and tolerant with those who show themselves critical in comparisons of official culture and traditional values. Socrates pays the highest price for this climate of tension and insecurity, as he is unjustly accused and condemned for having, according to the accuser Meletus, corrupted the youth with his "teachings" and despised the gods and the traditional religion of Athens.

The defense of Socrates, presented as in the "Apology" written by Plato, is clear, linear and calm, but it is not enough to avoid capital punishment in the form of suicide. He himself rejects any other type of sentence (such as prison, exile or the payment of a fine), provocatively proposing, as a just "punishment", to be hosted at the Prytaneion as a worthy citizen, and accepting the verdict of his judges. He also refuses the possibility offered to him by his friends to escape from prison before the execution of the sentence, faithful to his philosophical convictions whose pillars are justice and unconditional respect for the laws.

The film ends with the suicide of the philosopher, who is forced to drink a poison obtained from hemlock and who, until his last breath, does not stop reasoning and talking with his friends about life, death and the immortality of the soul.

== Production ==
Rossellini wanted to make a film on Socrates many years before starting production. He would joke that, like the Athenian philosopher, he failed to make money. Location shooting could not take place in Greece because of the Regime of the Colonels, so the movie was filmed in Patones Arriba, a town in Spain that was dressed up to look like Athens. Most of the script is lifted directly from de la Rochefoucauld's translations of Plato dialogues, particularly the Apology. Christian symbolism is also used heavily in this film. Socrates refers to his followers as his "disciples" and they all drink from a chalice in a scene heavy with symbolism.

== Cast ==
- Jean Sylvère as Socrates
- Anne Caprile as Xanthippe, Socrates' wife
- Giuseppe Mannajuolo as Apollodorus, Socrates' disciple
- Ricardo Palacios as Crito, Socrates' disciple
- Antonio Medina as Plato, Socrates' disciple
- Julio Morales as Antisthenes, Socrates' disciple
- Emilio Miguel Hernández as Meletus, Socrates' accuser
- Emilio Hernández Blanco as Ipperide
- Manuel Angel Egea as Cebes, Socrates' disciple
- Jesús Fernández as Cristobulus, Socrates' disciple
- Eduardo Puceiro as Simmias, Socrates' disciple
- José Renovales as Phaedo, Socrates' disciple
- Gonzalo Tejel as Anytus, supporter of Socrates' accuser
- Antonio Requena as Ermete
- Roberto Cruz as an old man
- Francisco Sanz as an actor
- Antonio Alfonso as Euthyphro, Socrates' disciple
- Juan Margallo as Critias, Socrates' disciple
- Román Ariznavarreta as Callicles, Socrates' disciple
- Francisco Calalá as Lysias, Socrates' disciple
- Adolfo Thous as Ippio
- Bernardo Ballester as Teofrasto
- Jean-Dominique de La Rochefoucauld as Phaedrus, Socrates' disciple
- César Bonet as Priest
- Jerzy Radlowsky as Giullare
- Pedro Estecha as Focione
- Rafael de la Rosa as Thrasybulus, Socrates' disciple
- Simón Arriaga as Servant bringing hemlock
- Iván Almagro as Hermogenes, Socrates' disciple
- Constant Rodriguez as Aristefo
- Stefano Charelli as Efigene
- Luis Alonso Gulias as Echino
- Jesus A. Gordon as Lamprocles, Socrates' son
- José Luis Ortega as younger son of Socrates
- Elio Seraffini as Priest
