= The unexamined life is not worth living =

Saying by Greek philosopher Socrates

"The unexamined life is not worth living" is a famous dictum supposedly uttered by Socrates at his trial for impiety and corrupting youth, for which he was subsequently sentenced to death. The dictum is recorded in Plato's Apology (38a5–6) as ὁ δὲ ἀνεξέταστος βίος οὐ βιωτὸς ἀνθρώπῳ (ho dè anexétastos bíos ou biōtòs anthrṓpōi, literally "but the unexamined life is not livable for a man").

== Rationale ==
This statement relates to Socrates' understanding and attitude towards death and his commitment to fulfilling his goal of investigating and understanding the statement of the Pythia (i.e., that there was no one wiser than Socrates). Socrates understood the Pythia's response to Chaerephon's question as a communication from the god Apollo and this became Socrates' prime directive and raison d'être. For Socrates, to be separated from elenchus by exile (preventing him from investigating the statement) was therefore a fate worse than death. Since Socrates was religious and trusted his religious experiences, such as his guiding daimonic voice, he accordingly preferred to continue to seek the truth to the answer to his question, in the after-life, than live a life not identifying the answer on earth.

== Meaning ==
Socrates believed that a life devoid of introspection, self-reflection, and critical thinking is essentially meaningless and lacks value. This quote emphasizes the importance of self-awareness and questioning one's beliefs, actions, and purpose in life.

The words were supposedly spoken by Socrates at his trial after he chose death, rather than exile. They represent (in modern terms) the noble choice, that is, the choice of death in the face of an alternative.

== Interpretation ==
Socrates believed that philosophy – the love of wisdom – was the most important pursuit above all else. For some, he exemplifies more than anyone else in history the pursuit of wisdom through questioning and logical argument, by examining and thinking. His "examination" of life in this way spilled out into the lives of others, such that they began their own "examination" of life, but he knew they would all die one day, saying that a life without philosophy – an "unexamined" life – was not worth living.

As part of Plato's continued relevance to philosophy throughout the history of philosophy as well as contemporary philosophy, Socrates' dictum also represents the continuing import of philosophy as a self-reflecting activity, including reflecting on the activity of philosophy itself. Yafeng Shan writes in "The unexamined philosophy is not worth doing: An introduction to New Directions in Metaphilosophy" that "[o]ne of the most distinctive features of philosophy is self-reflection. Philosophers are not only concerned with metaphysical, epistemological, conceptual, ethical, and aesthetic issues of things around us, they also pay serious attention to the nature, value, methods, and development of philosophy itself." These areas of philosophic inquiry are also seen in this context as a further "examination" of life without which, in line with Socrates' dictum, one's life is not worth living.

== See also ==
- Know thyself
