= Apology (Xenophon) =

Dialogue about Socrates' legal defence at his trial

The Apology of Socrates to the Jury (Ancient Greek: Ἀπολογία Σωκράτους πρὸς τοὺς Δικαστάς), by Xenophon of Athens, is a Socratic dialogue about the legal defence that the philosopher Socrates presented at his trial for the moral corruption of Athenian youth; and for asebeia (impiety) against the pantheon of Athens; judged guilty, Socrates was sentenced to death.

Xenophon’s literary rendition of the defence of Socrates evinces the philosopher’s ethical opinion about a sentence of death: that it is better to die before the onset of senility than to escape death by humbling oneself to an unjust persecution.

The other extant primary source about the persons and events of the Trial of Socrates (399 BC) is the Apology of Socrates, by Plato.

== History ==
The Apology of Socrates to the Jury is Xenophon’s literary contribution to the many apologia written to explain the trial of Socrates (399 BC) to the Athenian public. Each book was its author’s perceptions and interpretations of the guilty verdict against the public figure Socrates. The author Xenophon presents Socrates’s megalēgoria (boastful manner of speaking) at his trial as a tactic in his legal defense against the charges of corruption, impiety, and harming the Athenian state. The principal event in the Apology of Socrates to the Jury is Socrates’s rejection of an attack upon his character by Anytus.

In 399 BC, Xenophon was serving with the Greek mercenary army of the Ten Thousand (cf. Anabasis), so he was not actually in Athens for the trial of Socrates. Xenophon’s primary source for the Socratic dialogue was the philosopher Hermogenes, who had attended the trial. This source is a little troublesome because Hermogenes' role is described by Plato in a way that raises some inconsistency. Hermogenes appears in Plato's Phaedo as a witness to the death of Socrates but does not make an appearance in the Apology of Socrates. Consequently, Xenophon’s interpretation of Socrates’s megalēgoria (boastful speaking-manner) as a legal defense should always be considered in light of Plato's interpretation of Socrates' legal defense as presented in the Apology of Socrates.

In the literary production of Xenophon of Athens, the final chapter of Memorabilia contains some of the apology text, which are the opening paragraphs of the Apology of Socrates to the Jury. The textual repetitions in the books, indicate that the Apology was Xenophon’s original conclusion to the Memorabilia.

== Contrast with Plato's Apology of Socrates ==
The stylistic differences between the Socratic dialogues Apology of Socrates to the Jury, by Xenophon, and the Apology of Socrates, by Plato, is in the literary descriptions of the philosopher by the Oracle at Delphi; in Xenophon's dialogue, the Oracle said that there was no man "more free, more just, or more sound of mind" than Socrates; in Plato's dialogue, the Oracle said that there was no man "wiser" than Socrates. Moreover, the narrative differences in the dialogues indicate that Xenophon avoided direct attribution of "wisdom", the term suggesting that Socrates was accurately characterized as a natural philosopher and an atheist in, for example, Aristophanes's comedy The Clouds (423 BC). As portrayed by Xenophon, Socrates does not claim to be wise "from the time when I began to understand spoken words... [I] have never left off seeking after and learning every good thing that I could."

Moreover, in Xenophon's Apology of Socrates, the philosopher's daimon (divine sign) is described as giving positive indications about what to do (12), whereas the philosopher Socrates portrayed by Plato consistently and explicitly describes the daimonion as meant to "turn me away from something I am about to do", but "never encourage me to do anything".

A further difference between Plato and Xenophon is that whereas Plato has Socrates finally suggest a thirty-mina penalty for himself, the Xenophon/Hermogenes version says that he refused to suggest any and refused to allow his friends to do so, claiming that to do otherwise would imply guilt.

Finally, whereas Socrates' willingness to face the death penalty is in Plato's Apology explained by Socrates' unwavering commitment to his divinely appointed mission to keep philosophizing at all costs, it is explained in the Xenophon/Hermogenes version by the claim that it is better for him to die now than to face the pains and limitations of advanced old age.

The accuracy of Xenophon's portrayal of Socrates has been called into question. Bertrand Russell said that if Xenophon's portrayal of Socrates was accurate he would not have been put to death. However he clarifies "some of Xenophon's reminiscences are very convincing".

== See also ==
- Apology (Plato)
