= Problem of Socrates =

Problem of Socrates may refer to:

- The Socratic problem, how to reconstruct the life of Socrates based on limited historical evidence
- The Problem of Socrates, Friedrich Nietzsche's criticism of Socrates and other philosophers
