= Socratic problem =

Problems in reconstructing a historical and philosophical image of Socrates

In historical scholarship, the Socratic problem (also called Socratic question) concerns attempts at reconstructing a historical and philosophical image of Socrates based on the variable, and sometimes contradictory, nature of the existing sources on his life. Scholars rely upon extant sources, such as those of contemporaries like Aristophanes or disciples of Socrates like Plato and Xenophon, for knowing anything about Socrates. However, these sources contain contradictory details of his life, words, and beliefs when taken together. This complicates the attempts at reconstructing the beliefs and philosophical views held by the historical Socrates. It has become apparent to scholarship that this problem is seemingly impossible to clarify and thus perhaps now classified as unsolvable. Early proposed solutions to the matter still pose significant problems today.

Socrates was the main character in most of Plato's dialogues and was a genuine historical figure. It is widely understood that in later dialogues, Plato used the character Socrates to give voice to views which belonged to the former. Besides Plato, three other important sources exist for the study of Socrates: Aristophanes, Aristotle, and Xenophon. Since no writings by Socrates himself survive to the modern era, his actual views must be discerned from the sometimes contradictory reports of these four sources. The main sources for the historical Socrates are the Sokratikoi logoi, or Socratic dialogues, which are reports of conversations apparently involving Socrates. Most information is found in the works of Plato and Xenophon.

There are also four sources extant in fragmentary states: Aeschines of Sphettus, Antisthenes, Euclid of Megara, and Phaedo of Elis. In addition, there are two satirical commentaries on Socrates. One is Aristophanes's play The Clouds, which humorously attacks Socrates. The other is two fragments from the Silloi by the Pyrrhonist philosopher Timon of Phlius, satirizing dogmatic philosophers.

== Xenophon ==
There are four works of Xenophon that deal with Socrates. They are Apology of Socrates to the Jurors (which apparently reports the defence given by Socrates in court), Memorabilia (which is a defence of Socrates and so-called Socratic dialogues), Oeconomicus (which concerns Socrates' encounter with Ischomachus and Critobulus), and Symposium (which recounts an evening at a dinner party to which Socrates was an attendee).

== Plato ==
Socrates was Plato's mentor. Plato, like some of his contemporaries, wrote dialogues about his teacher. Much of what is known about Socrates comes from Plato's writings; however, it is widely believed that very few, if any, of Plato's dialogues can be verbatim accounts of conversations between them or unmediated representations of Socrates' thought. Many of the dialogues seem to use Socrates as a device for Plato's thought, and inconsistencies occasionally crop up between Plato and the other accounts of Socrates; for instance, Plato has Socrates denying that he would ever accept money for teaching, while Xenophon's Symposium clearly has Socrates stating that students pay him to teach wisdom and that this is what he does for a living.

Stylometric analysis of Plato's work has led some scholars to classify dialogues as falling approximately into three groups, Early, Middle and Late. On the assumption that there is an evolution of philosophical thought in Plato's dialogues from his early years to his middle and later years, the most common modern view is that Plato's dialogues contain a development of thought from closer to that of Socrates' to a doctrine more distinctly Plato's own. However, the question of exactly what aspects of Plato's dialogues are representative of Socrates and what are not, is debated. Although the view that Plato's dialogues are developmental in their doctrines (with regard to the historical Socrates or not) is standard, the view is not without objectors who propose a unitarian view or other alternative interpretations of the chronology of the corpus. One notable example is Charles Kahn who argued that Plato had created his works not in a gradual way, but as a unified philosophical vision, whereby he uses Socratic dialogues, a non-historical genre, to flesh out his views. The time that Plato began to write his works and the date of composition of his last work are unknown and, adding to the complexity, even ancient sources do not know the order of the works or dialogues.

== Aristotle ==
Aristotle did not know Socrates directly; most of what he knew about him came from Plato and other sources. Therefore, Aristotle's views on Socrates focus primarily on Socrates’ philosophical method and dialogues. (Britannica) According to Aristotle, Socrates’ main aim was to examine the definition and essence of every concept. Socrates, through discussion and the method of question and answer, helped people recognize their own ignorance. Aristotle refers to this method as an inductive inquiry approach.According to Aristotle ... Aristotle also highlights the difference between Socrates and Plato. In his view, Socrates sought to clarify concepts in practical and everyday dialogues, whereas Plato connected concepts more systematically to an ideal world of forms. Therefore, Aristotle notes that Socrates developed a more inquisitive and definitional philosophical method. Aristotle states that Socrates did not defend the idea of forms existing separately, which is a view attributed to Plato. For Socrates, the focus was on finding the correct definition of each concept and showing people their own ignorance. Aristotle's assessment presents Socrates as a bridging figure in the development of philosophical methodology. Socrates’ method aimed not at directly transmitting knowledge but at encouraging learning through questioning and discussion. In summary, Aristotle interprets Socrates through his definitions and dialogue method, distinguishing him from Plato and viewing him as an early representative of philosophical methodology. These views are not directly from Socrates himself but are based on information transmitted through Plato and other sources.

== Others ==
=== Aeschines ===
Two relevant works pertain to periods in Socrates' life, of which Aeschines could not have had any personal first-hand experiential knowledge. However, substantial amounts are extant of his works Alcibiades and Aspasia.

=== Antisthenes ===
Antisthenes was a pupil of Socrates, and was known to accompany him.

== Issues relating to dates of the sources ==
Aristophanes (c. 450–386 BCE) was alive during the early years of Socrates. One source shows Plato and Xenophon were about 45 years younger than Socrates and states that when Aristophanes wrote Clouds in 423 BC, both Plato and Xenophon were infants. other sources show Plato as something in the range of 42–43 years younger, while Xenophon is thought to be 40 years younger. During the conversations with Socrates in Xenophon's Symposium, scholarly calculations place Xenophon as an infant of only a few years old.

=== Issues resulting from translation ===
Apart from the existing identified issue of conflicting elements present in accounts and writings, there is the additional inherent concern of the veracity of transfer of meaning by translation from classic Greek to contemporary language, whether that be Greek, English or any other.

== History of the problem ==
Efforts have been made by writers for centuries to address the problem. According to one scholar (Patzer) the number of works with any significance in this issue, prior to the nineteenth century, are few indeed. G.E. Lessing caused a flurry of interest in the problem in 1768. A methodology for analysis was posited, by study of Platonic sources, in 1820 with Socher. A break of scholarly impasse in respect to understanding, resulted from Campbell making a stylometric analysis in 1867.

An essay written by Friedrich Schleiermacher in 1815 ("The Worth of Socrates as a Philosopher"), published 1818 (English translation 1833) is considered the most significant and influential toward developing an understanding of the problem.

Throughout the 20th century, two strains of interpretation arose: the literary contextualists, who tended to interpret Socratic dialogues based on literary criticism, and the analysts, who focus much more heavily on the actual arguments contained within the different texts.

Early in the 21st century, most of the scholars concerned have settled to agreement instead of argument about the nature of the significance of ancient textual sources in relation to this problem.

== Manuscript tradition ==
A fragment of Plato's Republic (588b-589b) was found in Codex VI, of the Nag Hammadi discoveries of 1945.

=== Plato primary edition ===
The Latin language corpus was by Ficinus during 1484, the first of a Greek language text was Aldus in 1513.

=== Xenophon primary edition ===
The Memorabilia appeared in the Florence Junta in 1516.

The first Apology was by Johann Reuchlin in 1520.

== Scholarly analysis ==
The German classical scholar Friedrich Schleiermacher addressed the "Socratic problem" in his essay "The Worth of Socrates as a Philosopher" (published in 1818). Schleiermacher maintained that the two dialogues Apology and Crito are purely Socratic. They were, therefore, accurate historical portrayals of the real man, and hence history and not Platonic philosophy at all. All of the other dialogues that Schleiermacher accepted as genuine he considered to be integrally bound together and consistent in their Platonism. Their consistency is related to the three phases of Plato's development:

1. Foundation works, culminating in Parmenides;
2. Transitional works, culminating in two so-called families of dialogues, the first consisting of Sophist, Statesman and Symposium, and the second of Phaedo and Philebus; and finally
3. Constructive works: Republic, Timaeus and Laws.

Schleiermacher's views on the chronology of Plato's work are rather controversial. In Schleiermacher's view, the character of Socrates evolves over time into the "Stranger" in Plato's work, and fulfills a critical function in Plato's development, as he appears in the first family above as the "Eleatic Stranger" in Sophist and Statesman, and as the "Mantitenean Stranger" in the Symposium. The "Athenian Stranger" is the main character of Plato's Laws. Further, the Sophist–Statesman–Philosopher family makes particularly good sense in this order, as Schleiermacher also maintains that the two dialogues, Symposium and Phaedo, show Socrates as the quintessential philosopher in life (guided by Diotima) and into death, the realm of otherness. Thus the triad announced both in the Sophist and in the Statesman is completed, although the Philosopher, being divided dialectically into a "Stranger" portion and a "Socrates" portion, is not called "The Philosopher"; this philosophical crux is left to the reader to determine. Schleiermacher thus takes the position that the real Socratic problem is understanding the dialectic between the figures of the "Stranger" and "Socrates".

Søren Kierkegaard addressed the Socratic problem in Theses II, III and VII of his On the Concept of Irony with Continual Reference to Socrates (1841).

Karl Popper, who considered himself to be a disciple of Socrates, wrote about the Socratic problem in his book The Open Society and Its Enemies (1945).

== Proposed solutions ==
Four solutions elucidated by Nails were proposed early in the history of the Socratic problem and are still relevant, even though each still poses problems today:

1. Socrates is the individual whose qualities exhibited in Plato's writings are corroborated by Aristophanes and Xenophon.
2. Socrates is he who claims “to possess no wisdom” but still participates in exercises with the aim of gaining understanding.
3. Socrates is the [individual named] Socrates who appears in Plato's earliest dialogues.
4. The real Socrates is the one who turns from a pre-Socratic interest in nature to ethics, instead.
