= Gadfly (philosophy and social science) =

Person who interferes with the status quo of a society or community

A gadfly is a person who interferes with the status quo of a society or community by posing novel, potentially upsetting questions, usually directed at authorities. The term has a modern use but it was originally associated with the ancient Greek philosopher Socrates, as portrayed in Plato's Apology when Socrates was on trial for his life.

== History ==
=== Socrates ===
The term "gadfly" (Ancient Greek: μύωψ, mýops) was used by Plato in the Apology to describe Socrates' acting as an uncomfortable goad to the Athenian political scene, like a spur or biting fly arousing a sluggish horse.

During his defense when on trial for his life, Socrates, according to Plato's account, pointed out that dissent, like the gadfly, was easy to swat, but the cost to society of silencing individuals who were irritating could be very high: "If you kill a man like me, you will injure yourselves more than you will injure me" because his role was comparable to that of a gadfly: "to sting people and whip them into a fury, all in the service of truth".

Dominic Scott notes that in the Apology, the allusion speaks well of Socrates, whereas in the Meno, the image which compares Socrates to a stingray who "numbs" his interlocutors into silence and confusion has the opposite effect.

=== Modern politics ===
The image used by Socrates is applied in modern politics: a gadfly is someone who persistently challenges people in positions of power, the status quo or a popular position. For example, Morris Kline wrote, "There is a function for the gadfly who poses questions that many specialists would like to overlook. Polemics is healthy." In his Letter from Birmingham Jail, Martin Luther King Jr. wrote of "the need for nonviolent gadflies to create the kind of tension in society that will help men rise from the dark depths of prejudice and racism to the majestic heights of understanding and brotherhood."

== See also ==
- Concern troll – a false flag pseudonym created by a user whose actual point of view is opposed to the one that the troll claims to hold
- Devil's advocate – taking a position one does not necessarily agree with
