= Apollodorus of Phaleron =

Apollodorus of Phaleron (Greek: Ἀπολλόδωρος Φαληρεύς, Apollódōros Phalēreύs, c. 445 – 4th century BCE) was an Ancient Athenian student and prominent follower of Socrates frequently depicted in the Socratic literature.

== Life ==
Most of what is known of Apollodorus' life comes from Plato, and particularly the Symposium. Here, Apollodorus describes himself as being of the same age as Plato's brother Glaucon, placing his birth date around 445 BCE. A resident of the Athenian port of Phaleron, he enjoyed financial success before coming to follow Socrates along with his brother Aiantodorus in the years before the philosopher's death. As depicted in Plato's Phaedo, he was present at Socrates' execution and thereafter remained aggressively loyal to his master's teachings. Plato and other ancient authors depict him as an emotionally volatile and simple-minded individual who nonetheless contributed significantly by popularizing Socrates' views.

Apollodorus also appears or is mentioned in Plato's Apology, Xenophon's Memorabilia and Apology, and numerous later sources, including Athenaeus, Cicero's On the Nature of the Gods and Plutarch's Cato the Younger. Scholars generally assume that the sculptor named Apollodorus mentioned in Pliny the Elder's Natural History is a different individual.

== See also ==
- List of speakers in Plato's dialogues
