= Socrates on Trial =

Play written by Andrew David Irvine

- First-edition cover (University of Toronto Press)
- Written by: Andrew David Irvine
- Characters: Strepsiades; Pheidippides; Socrates; Stronger Argument; Weaker Argument; Meletus; Anytus; Lykon; Crito; Xanthippe; Executioner; Chorus
- Original language: English
- Subject: The trial of Socrates
- Genre: Historical drama
- Setting: Ancient Athens

Premiere
- Date premiered: 2007
- Place premiered: Chan Centre for the Performing Arts, Vancouver, British Columbia, Canada

Socrates on Trial is a play depicting the life and death of the ancient Greek philosopher Socrates. It tells the story of how Socrates was put on trial for corrupting the youth of Athens and for failing to honour the city's gods. The play contains adaptations of several classic Greek works: the slapstick comedy, Clouds, written by Aristophanes and first performed in 423 BCE; the dramatic monologue, Apology, written by Plato to record the defence speech Socrates gave at his trial; and Plato's Crito and Phaedo, two dialogues describing the events leading to Socrates’ execution in 399 BCE. The play was written by Andrew David Irvine of the University of British Columbia and premiered by director Joan Bryans of Vital Spark Theatre Company in 2007 at the Chan Centre for the Performing Arts in Vancouver.

In the judgment of one reviewer, the play succeeds in presenting Socrates both as Plato's wise mentor and as the “pompous, arrogant and often petulant” teacher presented by Aristophanes, giving modern audiences a greater appreciation of why Socrates eventually ended up being sentenced to death.

In the judgment of another reviewer, the play is “a worthy analogue of an ancient masterpiece.”

== Plot ==
The play takes place in three acts spread over a quarter century. Act One, like Aristophanes’ Clouds on which the act is based, is satirical. The act opens with Strepsiades, an Athenian businessman, worried about his lazy son Pheidippides. To educate him, Strepsiades enrolls him in Socrates’ School of Thinkology. While at the school, the young man is encouraged to consider both sides of every argument. Unfortunately, rather than being impressed by the Stronger Argument, which advocates virtue, excellence and moderation, Pheidippides is influenced more by the Weaker Argument, which advocates immorality, debauchery and dissoluteness. The result is a “mind blowing, portrayal of debauchery and irreverence” in which, rather than being educated, Pheidippides ends up being further corrupted by Socrates and his school.

Act Two takes place twenty-four years later. Socrates has been charged with corrupting the young and failing to recognize the city's traditional gods. The three men making the charges are Meletus, Anytus and Lykon. All three have given their speeches and Socrates is now required to defend himself in front of the jury. The speech Socrates gives is at times humorous and at times moving. However, far from apologizing for the influence he has had over the city's youth, Socrates remains defiant. Repeatedly he tells the jury that he has never run a school or worked as a teacher. Even so, the Athenians have been lucky to have had him raising questions about what they think they know, and about the nature of justice. The act ends with Socrates reminding the jury that he is innocent of all charges and that they have a duty, not to reward the speaker who has delivered the most polished speech, but to see that justice is done.

Act Three takes place a month later on the eve of Socrates’ execution. In Socrates’ jail cell, Socrates’ best friend, Crito, and Socrates’ wife, Xanthippe, take turns trying to convince the condemned man that he should escape, something that might easily be arranged. Socrates refuses, saying that to do so would further corrupt the young, something he swore to the jury he would never do.

To fulfill the order of execution, Socrates is required to drink a cup of hemlock, a type of poison. His last words, after the hemlock has begun to do its work, is that he and his friends owe a debt to Asclepius, the god of medicine. Some commentators have understood these words to mean that Socrates’ last concern, as he was preparing to enter the afterlife, was with the health of his soul. A much more likely explanation is that the offering was simply part of an annual religious festival that recognized the debt all Athenians owed to Asclepius for having recently delivered them from the plague. Having just told all of Athens that he respected the gods of the city and that he was not a corruptor of the young, Socrates would have been especially concerned to observe the city's rituals. The play ends with Socrates’ friends mourning their loss.

== Characters ==
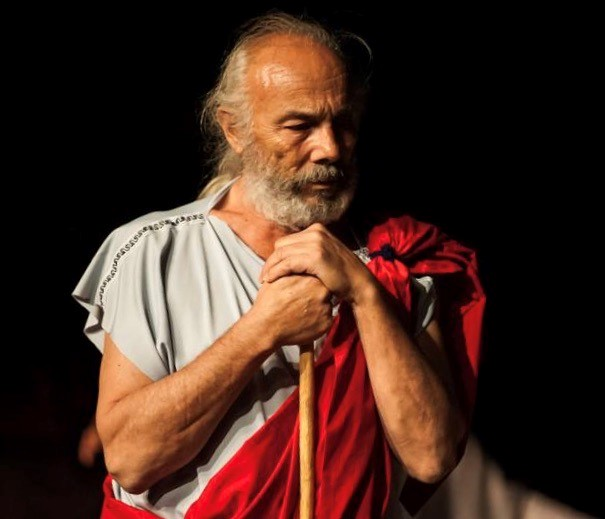
Socrates

- Strepsiades: An Athenian businessman, hoping to have his son educated.
- Pheidippides: The wayward son of Strepsiades.
- Socrates: Greece's most famous philosopher, thought by many to have been a corrupting influence on the youth of Athens.
- Stronger Argument: Personified in age.
- Weaker Argument: Personified in youth.
- Meletus: Socrates’ 1st accuser.
- Anytus: Socrates’ 2nd accuser.
- Lykon: Socrates’ 3rd accuser.
- Crito: Socrates’ best friend and the third richest man in Athens.
- Xanthippe: Socrates’ wife.
- Executioner: Strong enough to wrestle unwilling prisoners.
- Chorus: Various in number, originally of clouds, although any group of smart-Alec bystanders will do.

== Audience participation ==
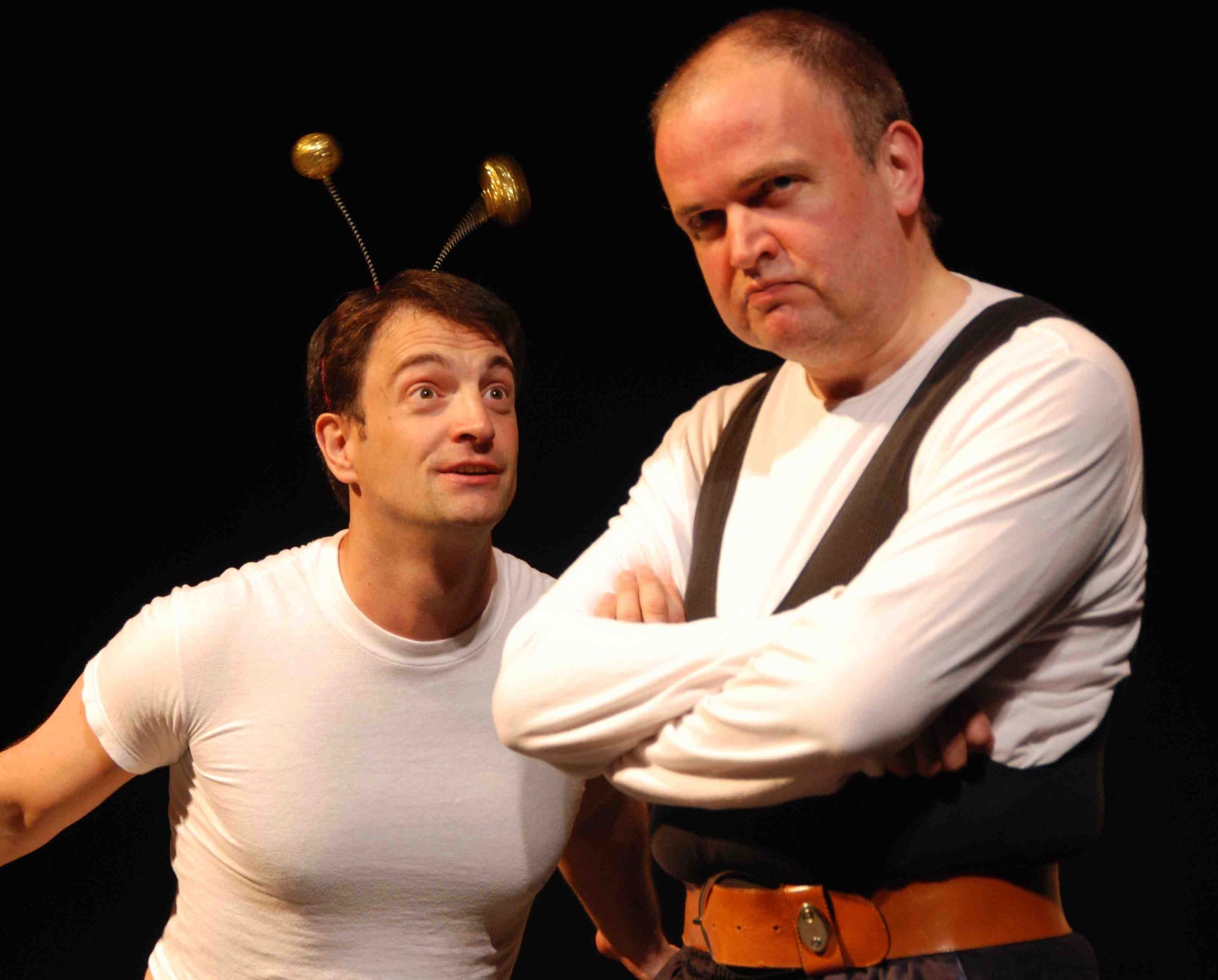
Scene from "Socrates on Trial"

Socrates on Trial strongly encourages audience participation. During Socrates’ day, juries were much larger than they are today. Juries of several hundred, or even several thousand, were not uncommon. Large juries were thought to make it more difficult for jurors to be bribed.

Athenian juries were also not quiet. If people thought a speaker was stretching or misrepresenting the truth, they’d often yell out, much to the delight of onlookers.

In the play, audience members are asked to serve as members of the jury. In Act Two they are encouraged join the actors in heckling Socrates. At the end of the act they are also given the job of voting to determine Socrates’ guilt or innocence.

One effective way of holding the vote is to have audience members walk to the front of the theatre to choose either a black or white stone and place it in a bronze container. Voting by a public show of hands – which was common in Athenian assemblies, but rare in Athenian trials – is not recommended, since a persuasive performance on the part of the actor playing the role of Socrates might encourage more audience members to vote in favour of Socrates’ acquittal than history allows.

In large theatres, directors may choose to restrict the size of the jury. However, given the large size of Athenian juries, it is more realistic to use larger rather than smaller portions of the audience for this purpose. Past directors have reported that participating as jurors is something audience members enjoy.

== Historical background ==
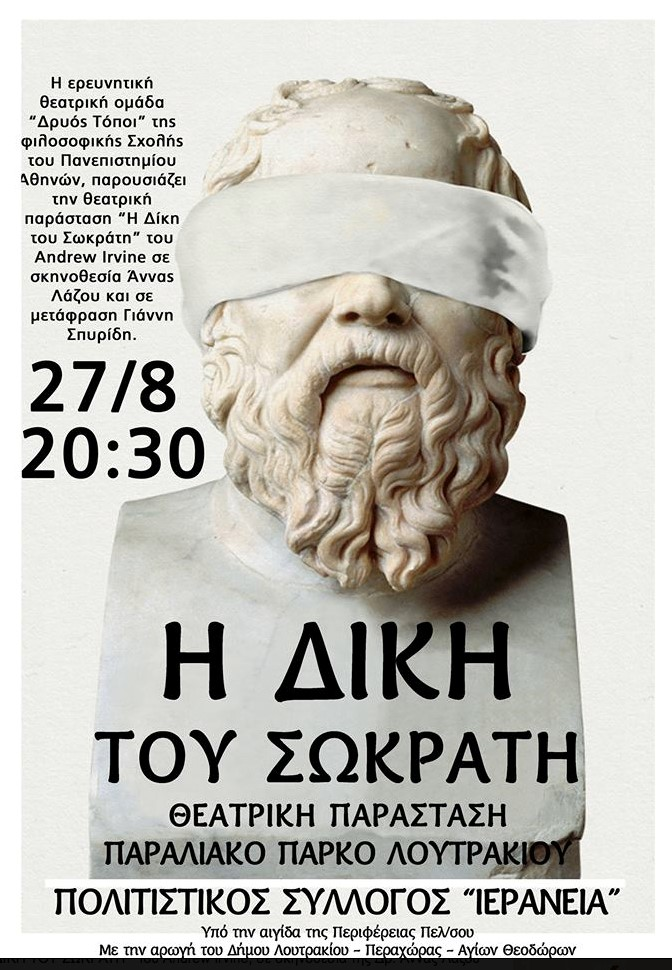
Playbill for the play "Socrates on Trial", 2016.

Because Socrates’ trial took place not long after the end of the Peloponnesian War, Athens’ humiliating loss to Sparta was still on many people's minds. During wartime, it was understood by the Greeks that victory came from two sources: the protection of the gods, and the unwavering loyalty of a city's young soldiers. So the charge of corrupting the young and failing to recognize the city's gods was serious, and much like the charge of treason.

Also on people's minds could have been the relationships Socrates had to several of Athens' most famous wartime traitors, including Critias and Alcibiades. Critias was reportedly related to Plato's mother, Perictione. Following the war, he became a leading member of the ruthless oligarchic regime the Spartans installed in Athens for eight months in 404-403, the Thirty Tyrants. Although some modern authors see this connection as a possible indication of Socrates' sympathy for the anti-democratic Spartans, this claim is hard to reconcile with the fact that it was the Thirty Tyrants who passed a law forbidding Socrates from speaking to any man under thirty, fearing his influence over the young. Socrates' connection to Alcibiades is similarly controversial, even though many of the details of Alcibiades's flamboyant life are well known. Alcibiades and Socrates fought together during the siege of Potidaea and again at the Battle of Delium, prior to Alcibiades' election to the post of Strategos (or General) and his eventual defection to Sparta. According to both Plato and Plutarch, as a young man Alcibiades admired and respected Socrates. Even so, the degree to which Socrates may have influenced his actions remains unclear.

One point of historical departure in the play is that the script gives the jury only a single opportunity to vote. Originally two votes were taken: the first to determine Socrates’ guilt or innocence, the second to choose between proposed penalties after he was found guilty. In contexts requiring greater historical authenticity, this second vote can easily be reintroduced although, depending on the size of the jury, doing so may add to the act's running time.

== Productions and adaptations ==
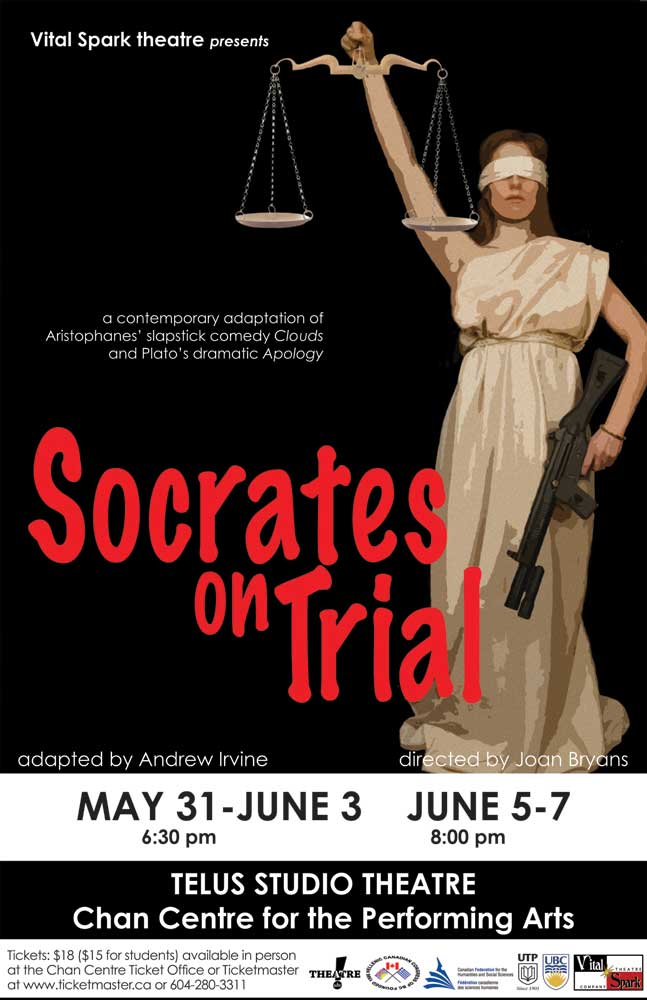
2008 playbill

The first workshop production of the play was mounted in Vancouver in 2006 by Vital Spark Theatre with Stephen Wexler playing the role of Socrates. The full play was premiered on March 14, 2007, at the Chan Centre for the Performing Arts in Vancouver. A 2008 production, also at the Chan Centre, included Paul Toolan in the title role. All three productions were directed by Joan Bryans.

The American premier of the play was held at College Theatre within the State University of New York at Potsdam. It took place on April 29, 2009, and was directed by Mandy Keister.

In 2012, the play was adapted into the opera The Trial of Socrates, with libretto and score by Andrew Hopper of the Birmingham Conservatoire. The opera was premiered in Birmingham on May 8, 2012.

On September 25, 2015, the play had its European premiere in Athens at the Alkmini Theatre under the direction of Anna Lazou. The translation into Greek was done by Giannis Spyridis. The title role was played by Demophilus-Vias Mpillinis and Thanassis Nakos. Music was provided by Christos Pantas. Costumes and masks were by Katerina Mpillinis.

The play was originally published in 2008 by the University of Toronto Press. Permission from the publisher has been granted royalty free for educational and other not-for-profit performances and readings, provided appropriate acknowledgement is given to both the playwright and the publisher.

In the words of reviewer Maya Alapin, “The play is refreshingly illuminating on the relationship between Socrates’ execution and the lasting influence of Aristophanes’ negative depiction of him on the evolution of the Athenian psyche. This connection, often underemphasized in modern analysis, is especially poignant given the unity of the three Acts ... The play succeeds in recreating an atmosphere of direct democracy and of depicting Socrates as deeply convinced of his own innocence. His commitment to obeying the laws is also emphasized, as is his persistent questioning of the general Athenian standard of moral education. Profound ethical questions surrounding the justness or unjustness of executing democratic dissenters are unambiguously raised. ... There is no doubt that the play is engaging, funny, insightful, and true to central Socratic positions and that it will appeal to a modern audience, particularly to students."
