= Andrew David Irvine =

Canadian academic (born 1958)

Andrew David Irvine, FSCC
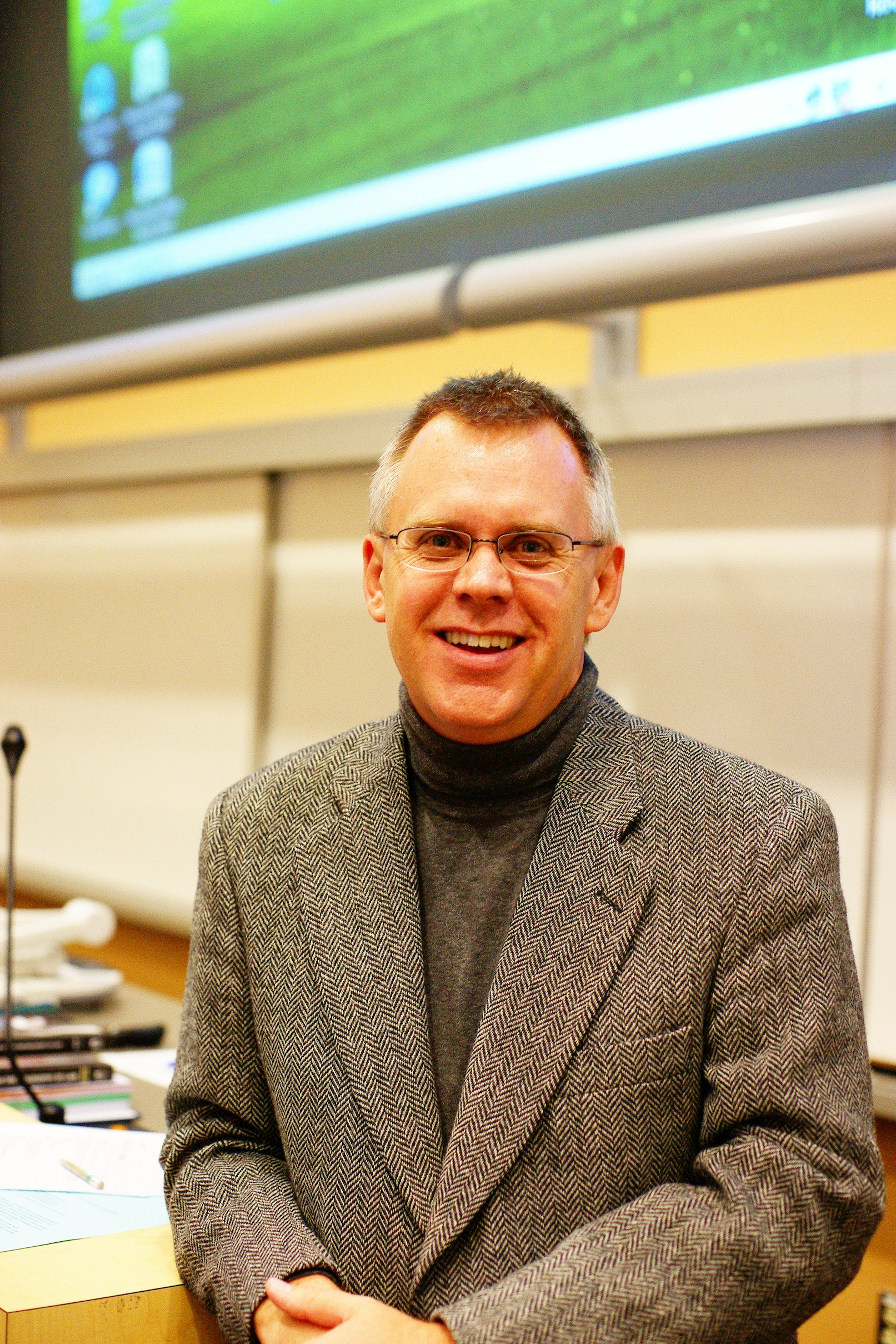
- Born: Andrew David Irvine; July 14, 1958 (age 68); Estevan, Saskatchewan, Canada
- Education: Sask (B.A.); UWO (M.A.); University of Sydney (Ph.D.)
- Occupations: Professor of philosophy and mathematics
- Employer: University of British Columbia
- Notable work: Socrates on Trial (2008)
- Website: UBC - Irvine

Andrew David Irvine, FSCC (born July 14, 1958) is a Canadian academic who teaches at the University of British Columbia. He holds a Ph.D. in philosophy from Sydney University and is a professor of philosophy and mathematics at UBC Okanagan. He has served as vice-chair of the UBC Board of Governors, as head of the UBCO Department of Economics, Philosophy and Political Science, as president of the British Columbia Civil Liberties Association, and as a member of the board of directors of the Society for Academic Freedom and Scholarship. An advocate of traditional democratic civil liberties, Irvine has written about the importance of the rule of law for both modern and ancient democracies. He has held visiting positions at Canadian, American and British universities and has been recognized as one of British Columbia's most influential public intellectuals.

== Early life ==
Born in Estevan, Saskatchewan, Irvine was raised in Oxbow, Saskatchewan.

== Academic work ==
Often cited for his work on the twentieth-century philosopher Bertrand Russell, Irvine has argued in favour of physicalism and against several commonly held views in the history of modern philosophy, including the claim that Gottlob Frege succeeded in developing a workable theory of mathematical platonism and the claim that Bertrand Russell was an advocate of epistemic logicism, a claim that one commentator has concluded is now "thoroughly debunked."

He has defended a two-box solution to Newcomb's problem in which he abandons "the (false) assumption that past observed frequency is an infallible guide to probability" and a non-cognitivist solution to the liar paradox, noting that "formal criteria alone will inevitably prove insufficient" for determining whether individual sentence tokens have meaning.

In modal logic (which studies theories of possibility and necessity), he has argued in favour of the non-normal system S7, rather than more traditional systems such as S4 or S5. Unlike other systems, S7 allows logicians to choose between competing logics, each of which, if true, would be necessarily true, but none of which are necessarily the correct system of necessary truths. As Irvine puts it, "just as being physically possible means nothing more than being consistent with the laws of physics, being logically possible means nothing more than being consistent with the laws of logic. However, this leaves open the question of which logic and which consistency relation are to be adopted. S7 gives us the language to discuss the possible denial of necessary truths. S7 gives us the language to assert not only that some propositions really are necessary; it gives us the language also to note that their denials, although impossible, remain possibly possible." In other words, there is a mechanism in which even sets of necessary truths can be compared to their alternatives.

Together with Carl Hodge, Irvine is author of The Ethics and Economics of Liberal Democracies (2024).

== Political work ==
An advocate of traditional democratic civil liberties, Irvine has argued in favour of free speech rights, both for political reasons and in the context of defending academic freedom.

Together with Stephen Wexler, he has argued that modern constitutional protections of the rule of law can trace their roots as far back as Socrates' demand that even lawmakers must be bound by the law. It was this demand that led to Aristotle's distinction between psephismata (votes of the assembly) and nomos (statute law), and to the resulting debate over how best to decide questions of legal supremacy within a democracy.

Together with Jason Gratl, he has argued that, in its modern form, the rule of law helps resolve tensions between national security and public accountability and, together with John Whyte, he has argued that care needs to be taken with regard to electoral reform, especially when it comes to implementing proposals focusing on proportional representation.

To help safeguard the legal system from abuse, Irvine has emphasized the importance of three key principles – the rule of law, the separation of powers and democratic accountability. He is often cited in the media on issues ranging from free speech and academic freedom to parliamentary procedure and judicial activism.

In 2025, Irvine and four other petitioners asked the Supreme Court of British Columbia to defend the academic freedom of students and professors at the University of British Columbia by upholding section 66(1) of the BC University, a section that states that “A university must be non-sectarian and non-political in principle”. In line with this requirement, the petitioners sought a court order prohibiting the University of British Columbia "from engaging in political activity" by making statements on Israel and Palestine, by making Indigenous land acknowledgements, and by requiring obligatory agreement from faculty about diversity, equity, and inclusion doctrines.

== Theatre work ==
In 2007 Irvine premiered Socrates on Trial, a play depicting the life and death of the ancient Greek philosopher Socrates. The play tells the story of how Socrates was put on trial for corrupting the youth of Athens and for failing to honour the city's gods. The play contains adaptations of several classic Greek works including the slapstick comedy Clouds, written by Aristophanes and first performed in 423 BCE, and the dramatic monologue Apology, written by Plato to record the defence speech Socrates gave at his trial in 399 BCE. The premiere was directed by Joan Bryans of Vital Spark Theatre Company at the Chan Centre for the Performing Arts in Vancouver.

In the words of one reviewer, "The play is refreshingly illuminating on the relationship between Socrates' execution and the lasting influence of Aristophanes' negative depiction of him on the evolution of the Athenian psyche." According to another, the play not only gives an entertaining portrayal of Plato's famous mentor, but also a fascinating introduction to the "pompous, arrogant and often petulant" individual presented by Aristophanes, giving modern audiences a greater understanding of why Socrates eventually ended up being sentenced to death.

In 2024, Irvine's adaptation of the ancient Greek comedy Lysistrata by Aristophanes appeared under the title Aristophanes' Lysistrata: For Modern Performance. The adaptation situates the original play as a play within a play. The accompanying background scenes give directors the freedom to include (or omit) a few dramatic elements that may be helpful to modern audiences. As Irvine notes, "While most of Aristophanes' language has been reworked (with some sections being reordered and others omitted) ... the fact that works written over two thousand years ago can still be successfully performed today tells us a great deal about our shared humanity across the ages and around the world."

== Bibliographical work ==
In 1999, Irvine produced scholarly bibliographies of both the primary and secondary literature surrounding the Nobel Laureate Bertrand Russell. Together with Dawn Ogden, he also produced the first bibliographical index for Russell's influential book, A History of Western Philosophy. The index is based on the second British edition (of 1979). A conversion table gives page references for both the first American edition (of 1945) and the first British edition (of 1946).

Together with Edmond Rivère, Irvine is the author of the first comprehensive, scholarly bibliography of Canada's premier literary prize, the Governor General's Literary Awards. The original version of the bibliography covers the history of the awards from their inception in 1936 through to the end of 2013 and appeared in Papers of the Bibliographical Society of Canada in 2014. The bibliography was later expanded and published in book form with the University of Ottawa Press.

== Literary references ==
In 1994, Irvine served as inspiration for the character Hardy Orbs in the dystopian novel, Fair New World. The novel was written by Lou Marinoff under the pseudonym Lou Tafler. A twenty-fifth anniversary re-issue in 2019 contained a foreword purportedly written by Orbs.

== Books ==
- Physicalism in Mathematics (ed.), Dordrecht: Kluwer Academic Publishers, 1990 ISBN 0-7923-0513-2 (hardback); ISBN 978-9400-91903-7 (paperback); ISBN 978-9400-91902-0 (ebk)
- (with Gary A. Wedeking) Russell and Analytic Philosophy (eds), Toronto, University of Toronto Press, 1993 ISBN 0-8020-2875-6 (hardback)
- Bertrand Russell – Life, Work and Influence (ed.), London: Routledge, 1999 ISBN 0-415-13055-7 (Volume 1 of Bertrand Russell: Critical Assessments. London: Routledge. 1999. ISBN 0-415-13054-9) (hardback)
- Bertrand Russell – Logic and Mathematics (ed.), London: Routledge, 1999 ISBN 0-415-13056-5 (Volume 2 of Bertrand Russell: Critical Assessments. London: Routledge. 1999. ISBN 0-415-13054-9) (hardback)
- Bertrand Russell – Language, Knowledge and the World (ed.), London: Routledge, 1999 ISBN 0-415-13057-3 (Volume 3 of Bertrand Russell: Critical Assessments. London: Routledge. 1999. ISBN 0-415-13054-9) (hardback)
- Bertrand Russell – History of Philosophy, Ethics, Education, Religion and Politics (ed.), London: Routledge, 1999 ISBN 0-415-13058-1 (Volume 4 of Bertrand Russell: Critical Assessments. London: Routledge. 1999. ISBN 0-415-13054-9) (hardback)
- Bertrand Russell: Critical Assessments (ed.), London: Routledge, 1999 ISBN 978-0-41513-054-7 (Combined volume) (hardback)
- (with John Woods and Douglas Walton) Argument, Toronto: Pearson, 2000, 2003 ISBN 0-13-085115-9 (1st edn) (paperback); ISBN 0-13-039938-8 (2nd edn) (paperback)
- David Stove's On Enlightenment (ed.), New Brunswick: Transaction, 2003 ISBN 0-7658-0136-1 (hardback), ISBN 978-1-4128-5186-2 (paperback)
- (with Kent Peacock) Mistakes of Reason (eds), Toronto: University of Toronto Press, 2005 ISBN 0-8020-3866-2 (hardback)
- (with John Russell) In the Agora (eds), Toronto: University of Toronto Press, 2006 ISBN 0-8020-3895-6 (hardback), ISBN 0-8020-3817-4 (paperback)
- Socrates on Trial, Toronto: University of Toronto Press, 2008 ISBN 978-0-8020-9783-5 (hardback), ISBN 978-0-8020-9538-1 (paperback), ISBN 978-0-8020-9538-1 (e-pub)
- Philosophy of Mathematics (ed.), Amsterdam: Elsevier / North-Holland, 2009 ISBN 978-0-444-51555-1 (hardback)
- David Stove's What's Wrong with Benevolence (ed.), New York: Encounter Books, 2011 ISBN 978-1-59403-523-4 (hardback)
- The Governor General's Literary Awards of Canada: A Bibliography, Ottawa: University of Ottawa Press, 2018 ISBN 978-0-7766-2739-7 (hardback), ISBN 978-0-7766-2740-3 (pdf), ISBN 978-0-7766-2741-0 (epub), ISBN 978-0-7766-2742-7 (Kindle)
- Les Prix littéraires du Gouverneur général du Canada: Une bibliographie, Ottawa; Les Presses de l’Université d’Ottawa, 2018 ISBN 978-2-7603-2727-6 (hardback), ISBN 978-2-7603-2728-3 (pdf), ISBN 978-2-7603-2729-0 (epub), ISBN 978-2-7603-2730-6 (Kindle)
- Canada's Storytellers: The GG Literary Award Laureates / Les grand écrivains du Canada: Les lauréats des Prix littéraires du GG, Ottawa: University of Ottawa Press, 2021 ISBN 978-0-7766-2803-5 (hardback), ISBN 978-0-7766-2804-2 (pdf), ISBN 978-0-7766-2805-9 (epub), ISBN 978-0-7766-2806-6 (Kindle)
- Lysistrata: Adapted from Aristophanes for modern performance, Athens: Kaktos Publications, 2024 ISBN 978-618-215-175-4 (paperback)
- (with Carl Hodge) The Ethics and Economics of Liberal Democracies, New York: Routledge, 2024 ISBN 978-1032-73009-7 (hardback), ISBN 978-1032-72949-7 (paperback), ISBN 978-1003-42410-9 (ebk)
- Analytic Philosophy: A User's Guide, London: College Publications, 2026 ISBN 978-1-84890-504-7 (paperback)

== Honours ==
On December 4, 2021, Irvine was elected a Fellow of the Institute for the Study of the Crown in Canada (FSCC).
