= Memorabilia (Xenophon) =

371 BCE collection of Socratic dialogues

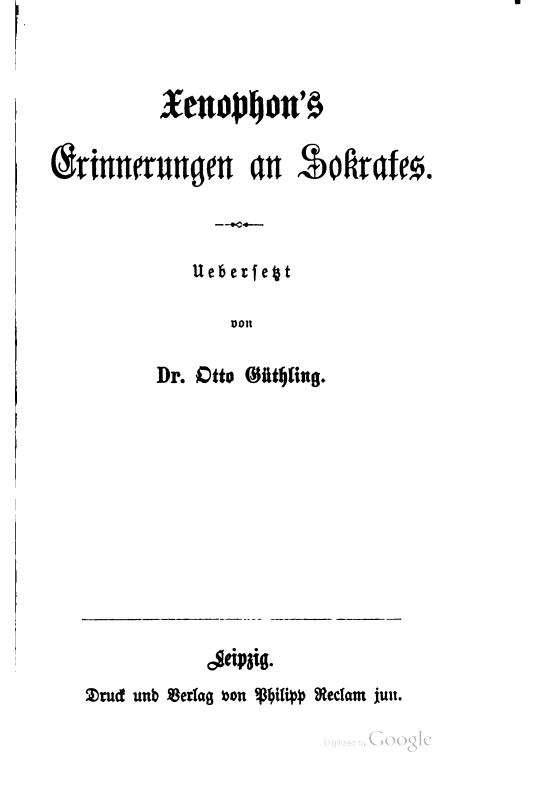
German edition from 1883

Memorabilia (original title in Ancient Greek: Ἀπομνημονεύματα, romanized: Apomnēmoneúmata) is a collection of Socratic dialogues by Xenophon (ca. 430 - 354 BC), a student of Socrates (ca. 470 – 399 BC). The lengthiest and most famous of Xenophon's Socratic writings, the Memorabilia is essentially an apologia (defense) of Socrates, differing from both Xenophon's Apology of Socrates to the Jury and Plato's Apology. Both Xenophon's and Plato's Apologies present Socrates as defending himself before the jury, whereas the Memorabilia presents Xenophon's own defense of Socrates, offering edifying examples of Socrates' conversations and activities along with occasional commentary from Xenophon. Memorabilia was particularly influential in Cynic and later Stoic philosophy.

== Title ==
Memorabilia is also known by its Latin title Commentarii and a variety of English translations (Recollections, Memoirs, Conversations of Socrates, etc.).

== Date of composition ==
The Memorabilia was probably completed after 371 BC, as one passage (III.5) appears to assume the military situation after the Spartan defeat at the Battle of Leuctra in that year. For some chronological perspective, during the conversations with Socrates in Xenophon's Symposium, scholarly calculations place Xenophon as an infant of only a few years old.

== Structure and contents ==
The Memorabilia contains 39 chapters broken into four books; Book I contains 7 chapters, Book II contains 10 chapters, Book III contains 14 chapters, and Book IV contains 8 chapters.

The overall organization of the Memorabilia is not always easy to make out:

- Book I. After the direct defense of Socrates (I.1-I.2), the rest of Book I consists of an account of Socrates' piety and self-control.
- Books II and III are devoted largely to showing how Socrates benefited his family, friends, and various Athenians who came to him for advice.
- Book IV turns to a more detailed account of how Socrates educated one particular student, Euthydemus. It includes an early example (possibly the earliest) of the Argument from Design (i.e. the Teleological Argument) (IV.3, anticipated already in I.4). Chapter 4 gives a related account of Natural Law.

In the lengthy first two chapters of the work, Xenophon argues that Socrates was innocent of the formal charges against him: failure to recognize the gods of Athens, introduction of new gods, and corruption of the youth. In addition to arguing that Socrates was most pious, and, as the most self-controlled of men, the least likely to corrupt the youth, Xenophon deals with informal political accusations not directly addressed in the Apology of Plato (or Xenophon's own Apology). Xenophon defends Socrates against the charge that he led the youth of Athens to despise democracy as a regime, and defends Socrates' association with Critias, the worst of the Thirty Tyrants who briefly ruled Athens in 404–403, and Alcibiades, the brilliant renegade democratic politician and general. It has often been argued that Xenophon is here responding not to charges in the air at time of the trial of Socrates in 399 BC, but to charges made some years later by the Athenian sophist Polycrates in his Accusation of Socrates. But Polycrates' work is lost, and our sources for reconstructing it are late and unreliable. The assumption that Xenophon was responding to Polycrates point by point may be driven as much by the traditionally low esteem for Xenophon's literary powers as to any historical influence from Polycrates. The role of Polycrates is one item in the debate over whether Xenophon's treatment of Socrates reflects the historical Socrates, or is a largely fictional contribution to the literary debate about Socrates. This debate is in turn an important element in our understanding the trial of Socrates, and in particular to the debate over whether the religious terms of the official accusation against Socrates (impiety) were a cover for political animosity against him.

Xenophon devotes the rest of the Memorabilia to demonstrating how Socrates benefited his friends and a wide range of other Athenians. It thus consists of episodes, mainly rather short and none more than a few pages in length, in which Socrates engages with a variety of persons: named and unnamed companions, rival teachers, famous and less famous Athenians. A few of the interlocutors appear several times. Typically Xenophon introduces the reason why he is writing about a particular conversation, and he will also occasionally interject a remark into the narrative, or at its conclusion.

== Comparison to Plato's dialogues ==
Xenophon's Socrates is more likely to give practical advice than to ask probing philosophical questions, and Xenophon is more interested in defending Socrates than in developing his philosophy. Where Plato's Socrates emphasizes self-knowledge, Xenophon's Socrates speaks more of self-control. Yet the Memorabilia also contains charming set-pieces (including Socrates' conversation with the glamorous courtesan (hetaera) Theodote in III.11, and his sharp exchanges with two of the Thirty Tyrants in I.2). And Xenophon likely aimed to reach a wider range of readers, many of whom may have welcomed the more down-to-earth advice his Socrates gives.

== Influence ==
Xenophon's portrayal of Socrates was influential in antiquity, and helps us understand how various schools of ancient thought made use of Socrates. The self-control of Xenophon's Socrates is in keeping with his role in inspiring ancient cynicism, which was traditionally said to be founded by Socrates' follower Antisthenes. It is clear that the Stoics made considerable use of Xenophon's version of the argument from design, and their account of natural law also owed something to Socrates, if not only to Xenophon's Socrates.

Aside from Plato and Aristophanes, Xenophon is the only contemporary of Socrates whose writings on the latter are extant.

Xenophon's account of how Heracles had to choose between Virtue and Vice, a story he attributes to Prodicus, became a popular motif in ancient Greek and Roman culture. It became popular again in the Renaissance.

== Translations ==
- Xenophon, Memorabilia, trans. Amy L. Bonnette, introd. by Christopher Bruell, Ithaca: Cornell University Press, The Agora Editions, 1994.
- Xenophon, "Memoirs of Socrates," in Conversations of Socrates, translated by Hugh Tredennick and Robin Waterfield, edited with new material by Robin Waterfield, pp. 53–216. Harmondsworth: Penguin, 1990. [The collection contains all of Xenophon's Socratic works.]
- Xenophon, Xenophon IV: Memorabilia, Oeconomicus, Symposium, Apology, trans. by E.C. Marchant, Cambridge: Harvard University Press, Loeb Classical Library, 1923. [Includes ancient Greek text and English translation on facing pages.]
- Xenophon The Memorable Thoughts of Socrates Edward Bysshe translation 1888
- Xenophon, Memorabilia, trans. Henry Graham Dakyns, London: Macmillan, 1897. (In Vol. 3 of The Works of Xenophon in Four Volumes.) link
- Xenophon, "The Anabasis, or Expedition of Cyrus and the Memorabilia of Socrates", translated by Rev. J.S. Watson, London: George Bell and Sons, Covent Garden, 1875.
- Xenophon, "Memoirs of Socrates", translated by Sarah Fielding, Bath: C. Pope, Stall Street, 1762.
