= Meno =

Dialogue by Plato

Meno (/ˈmiːnoʊ/; Ancient Greek: Μένων, romanized: Ménōn) is a Socratic dialogue written by Plato around 385 BC, but set at an earlier date around 402 BC. Meno begins the dialogue by asking Socrates whether virtue (in Ancient Greek: ἀρετή, aretē) can be taught, acquired by practice, or comes by nature. In order to determine whether virtue is teachable or not, Socrates tells Meno that they first need to determine what virtue is. When the characters speak of virtue, or aretē, they refer to virtue in general, rather than particular virtues, such as justice or temperance. The first part of the work showcases Socratic dialectical style; Meno, unable to adequately define virtue, is reduced to confusion or aporia. Socrates suggests that they seek an adequate definition for virtue together. In response, Meno suggests that it is impossible to seek what one does not know, because one will be unable to determine whether one has found it.

Socrates challenges Meno's argument, often called "Meno's Paradox", "Learner's Paradox", or the "Arabic Paradox", by introducing the theory of knowledge as recollection (anamnesis). As presented in the dialogue, the theory proposes that souls are immortal and know all things in a disembodied state; learning in the embodied is actually a process of recollecting that which the soul knew before it came into a body. Socrates demonstrates recollection in action by posing a mathematical puzzle to one of Meno's slaves. Subsequently, Socrates and Meno return to the question of whether virtue is teachable, employing the method of hypothesis. Near the end of the dialogue, Meno poses another famous puzzle, called "the Meno problem" or "the Value Problem for Knowledge", which questions why knowledge is valued more highly than true belief. In response, Socrates provides a famous and somewhat enigmatic distinction between knowledge and true belief.

== Characters ==
Plato's Meno is a Socratic dialogue in which the two main speakers, Socrates and Meno (also transliterated as "Menon"), discuss human virtue: what it is, and whether or not it can be taught. Meno is visiting Athens from Thessaly with a large entourage of slaves attending him. Young, good-looking and well-born, he is a student of Gorgias, a prominent sophist whose views on virtue clearly influence Meno's. Early in the dialogue, Meno claims that he has held forth many times on the subject of virtue, and in front of large audiences.

One of Meno's slaves also has a speaking role, as one of the features of the dialogue is Socrates's engagement with the slave to demonstrate his idea of anamnesis: certain knowledge is innate and "recollected" by the soul through proper inquiry.

Another participant later in the dialogue is Athenian politician Anytus, later one of the prosecutors of Socrates, with whom Meno is friendly.

== Dialogue ==
=== Introduction of virtue ===
The dialogue begins with Meno asking Socrates to tell him whether virtue can be taught. Socrates says that he does not know what virtue is, and neither does anyone else he knows. Meno responds that, according to Gorgias, his Sophist mentor, virtue means different for different people, that what is virtuous for a man is to conduct himself in the city so that he helps his friends, injures his enemies, and takes care all the while that he personally comes to no harm. Virtue is different for a woman, he says. Her domain is the management of the household, and she is supposed to obey her husband. He says that children (male and female) have their own proper virtue, and so do old men—free or slaves. Socrates objects: there must be some virtue common to all human beings.

Socrates rejects the idea that human virtue depends on a person's sex or age. He leads Meno towards the idea that virtues are common to all people, that sophrosunê ('temperance', i.e. exercise of self-control) and dikê (aka dikaiosunê; 'justice', i.e. refrain from harming others) are virtues even in children and old men. Meno proposes to Socrates that the "capacity to govern men" may be a virtue common to all people. Socrates points out to the slaveholder that "governing well" cannot be a virtue of a slave, because then he would not be a slave.

One of the errors that Socrates points out is that Meno lists many particular virtues without defining a common feature inherent to virtues which makes them thus. Socrates remarks that Meno makes many out of one, like somebody who breaks a plate.

Meno proposes that virtue is the desire for good things and the power to get them. Socrates points out that this raises a second problem—many people do not recognize evil. The discussion then turns to the question of accounting for the fact that so many people are mistaken about good and evil and take one for the other. Socrates asks Meno to consider whether good things must be acquired virtuously in order to be really good. Socrates leads onto the question of whether virtue is one thing or many.

No satisfactory definition of virtue emerges in the Meno. Socrates's comments, however, show that he considers a successful definition to be unitary, rather than a list of varieties of virtue, that it must contain all and only those terms which are genuine instances of virtue, and must not be circular.

=== Meno's paradox ===
Meno asks Socrates:

And how will you enquire, Socrates, into that which you do not know? What will you put forth as the subject of enquiry? And if you find what you want, how will you ever know that this is the thing which you did not know?

Socrates rephrases the question, which has come to be the canonical statement of Meno's paradox or the paradox of inquiry:

[A] man cannot enquire either about that which he knows, or about that which he does not know; for if he knows, he has no need to enquire; and if not, he cannot; for he does not know the very subject about which he is to enquire.

— translated by Benjamin Jowett, 1871

=== Dialogue with Meno's slave ===
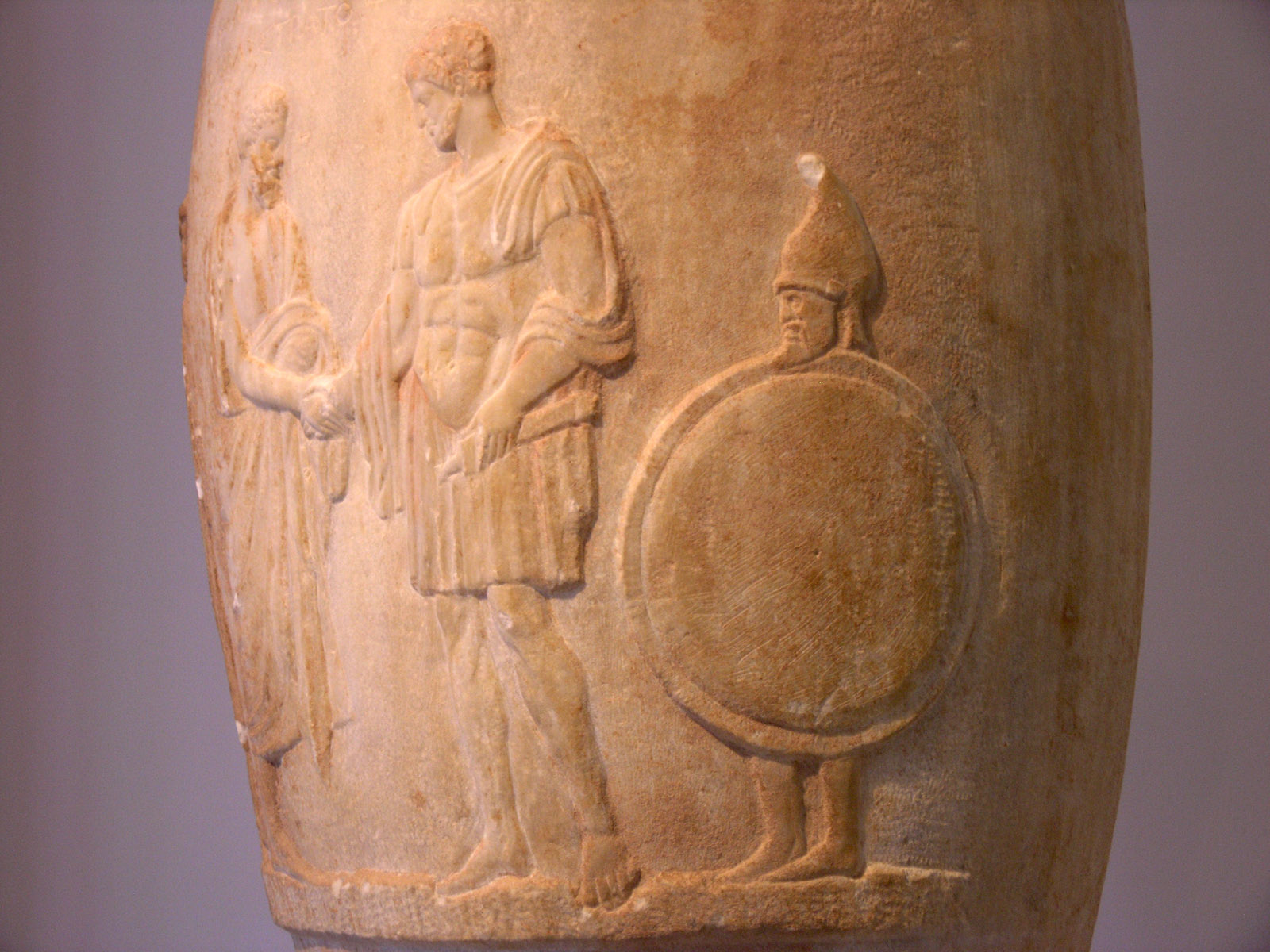
Depiction of an Athenian slave from 380 to 370 BC, National Archaeological Museum of Athens

Socrates responds to this sophistical paradox with a mythos ('narrative' or 'fiction') according to which souls are immortal and have learned everything prior to transmigrating into the human body. Since the soul has had contact with real things prior to birth, we have only to 'recollect' them when alive. Such recollection requires Socratic questioning, which according to Socrates is not teaching. Socrates demonstrates his method of questioning and recollection by interrogating a slave who is ignorant of geometry.

Socrates begins one of the most influential dialogues of Western philosophy regarding the argument for inborn knowledge. By drawing geometric figures in the ground Socrates demonstrates that the slave is initially unaware of the length that a side must be in order to double the area of a square with 2-foot sides. The slave guesses first that the original side must be doubled in length (4 feet), and when this proves too much, that it must be 3 feet. This is still too much, and the slave is at a loss.

Socrates claims that before he got hold of him the slave (who has been picked at random from Meno's entourage) might have thought he could speak "well and fluently" on the subject of a square double the size of a given square. Socrates comments that this "numbing" he caused in the slave has done him no harm and has even benefited him.

The blue square is twice the area of the yellow square.

Socrates then adds three more squares to the original square, to form a larger square four times the size. He draws four diagonal lines which bisect each of the smaller squares. Through questioning, Socrates leads the slave to the discovery that the square formed by these diagonals has an area of eight square feet, double that of the original. He says that the slave has "spontaneously recovered" knowledge which he knew from before he was born, without having been taught. Socrates is satisfied that new beliefs were "newly aroused" in the slave.

After witnessing the example with the slave boy, Meno tells Socrates that he thinks that Socrates is correct in his theory of recollection, to which Socrates agrees:

Some things I have said of which I am not altogether confident. But that we shall be better and braver and less helpless if we think that we ought to enquire, than we should have been if we indulged in the idle fancy that there was no knowing and no use in seeking to know what we do not know; that is a theme upon which I am ready to fight, in word and deed, to the utmost of my power.

— translated by Benjamin Jowett, 1871, Meno.

=== Anytus ===
Meno now beseeches Socrates to return to the original question, how virtue is acquired, and in particular, whether or not it is acquired by teaching or through life experience. Socrates proceeds on the hypothesis that virtue is knowledge, and it is quickly agreed that, if this is true, virtue is teachable. They turn to the question of whether virtue is indeed knowledge. Socrates is hesitant, because, if virtue were knowledge, there should be teachers and learners of it, but there are none.

Coincidentally Anytus appears, whom Socrates praises as the son of Anthemion, who earned his fortune with intelligence and hard work. He says that Anthemion had his son well-educated and so Anytus is well-suited to join the investigation. Socrates suggests that the sophists are teachers of virtue. Anytus is horrified, saying that he neither knows any, nor cares to know any. Socrates then questions why it is that men do not always produce sons of the same virtue as themselves. He alludes to other notable male figures, such as Themistocles, Aristides, Pericles and Thucydides, and casts doubt on whether these men produced sons as capable of virtue as themselves. Anytus becomes offended and accuses Socrates of slander, warning him to be careful expressing such opinions. (The historical Anytus was one of Socrates's accusers in his trial.) Socrates suggests that Anytus does not realize what slander is, and continues his dialogue with Meno as to the definition of virtue.

=== True belief and knowledge ===
After the discussion with Anytus, Socrates returns to quizzing Meno for his own thoughts on whether the sophists are teachers of virtue and whether virtue can be taught. Meno is again at a loss, and Socrates suggests that they have made a mistake in agreeing that knowledge is required for virtue. He points out the similarities and differences between "true belief" and "knowledge". True beliefs are as useful to us as knowledge, but they often fail to "stay in their place" and must be "tethered" by what he calls aitias logismos ('calculation of reason' or 'reasoned explanation'), immediately adding that this is anamnesis, or recollection.

Whether Plato intends that the tethering of true beliefs with reasoned explanations must always involve anamnesis is explored in later interpretations of the text. Socrates's distinction between "true belief" and "knowledge" forms the basis of the philosophical definition of knowledge as "justified true belief". Myles Burnyeat and others, however, have argued that the phrase aitias logismos refers to a practical working out of a solution, rather than a justification.

Socrates concludes that, in the virtuous people of the present and the past, at least, virtue has been the result of divine inspiration, akin to the inspiration of the poets, whereas a knowledge of it will require answering the basic question, what is virtue?. In most modern readings these closing remarks are "evidently ironic", but Socrates's invocation of the gods may be sincere, albeit "highly tentative".

This passage in the Meno is often seen as the first statement of the problem of the value of knowledge or "the Meno problem": how is knowledge more valuable than mere true belief? The nature of knowledge and belief is also discussed in the Theaetetus.

== Meno and Protagoras ==
Meno's theme is also dealt with in the dialogue Protagoras, where Plato ultimately has Socrates arrive at the opposite conclusion: virtue can be taught. Likewise, while in Protagoras knowledge is uncompromisingly this-worldly, in Meno the theory of recollection points to a link between knowledge and eternal truths.

== Texts and translations ==
- Meno, in a collection of Plato's Dialogues at Standard Ebooks
- Jowett, Benjamin. 1871. "Meno." – via Internet Classics Archive. Project Gutenberg: 1643.
- Lamb, W. R. M., trans. [1924] 1967. "Meno." Plato in Twelve Volumes 3. Cambridge, MA, Harvard University Press. ISBN 0-674-99183-4, 0-674-99184-2. – via Perseus Project.
- Woods, Cathal, trans. 2011. "Meno." SSRN 1910945.
