= Anytus =

Late 5th/early-4th century BC Athenian politician

Anytus (/ˈænɪtəs/; Ancient Greek: Ἄνυτος, romanized: Ánytos; probably before 451 – after 388 BCE), son of Anthemion of the deme Euonymon, was a politician in Classical Athens. Anytus served as a general in the Peloponnesian War of 431 to 404 BCE, and later became a leading supporter of the democratic forces opposed to the Thirty Tyrants who ruled Athens from 404 to 403 BCE. He is best remembered as one of the prosecutors of the philosopher Socrates in 399 BCE; probably because of that role, Plato depicted Anytus as an interlocutor in the dialogue Meno.

== Ancestry ==
Anytus appears to have been one of the nouveaux riche of Athens, that is, of the commercial class and not one of the landed aristocracy that had ruled the city since time immemorial. His father is believed to be the Anthemion, son of Diphilus, that dedicated a statue on the Acropolis in thanks for his rise to class of “knight”. The Aristotelian Athenaion Politeia had this attribution:

In the Acropolis there is a votive offering, a statue of Diphilus, bearing this inscription:

“Anthemion, the son of Diphilos, has dedicated this statue to the Gods, when from the status of a Thetis he had been raised to the status of a Knight.”

And a horse stands in evidence beside the man, implying that this was what was meant by belonging to the rank of Knight.

Though this connection for Anytus is not certain, most modern historians accept it based on Socrates’s comment in Plato’s Meno to the effect that Anytus was:

the son of Anthemion, a man of property and good sense, who didn’t get his money out of the blue or as a gift ... but earned it by his own brains and hard work.

The family wealth was generated by Anthemion’s tannery and shoemaking businesses. Anytus inherited and continued to manage these.

== Career ==
Little is known of Anytus’s activities during his adult years – just a few incidents in which he was involved.

He was appointed to the post of general (strategos) in late years of the Peloponnesian War. In 409/8 BC, he was assigned the task of taking a fleet of ships to defend the outpost of Pylos in the western Peloponnese. Athens had captured this rocky crag in 425 BC and staffed it with runaway helots who harassed the Spartans in the region in the following years. In the spring and summer of 409 BC, it was under attack by the Spartans, and the Athenians sought to bolster its defenses with the force led by Anytus. He failed to complete the mission because storms at sea prevented his sailing around the southern reaches of the Peloponnese. When he returned to Athens he was prosecuted for treason, something frequently done to generals who failed to complete the tasks assigned to them. In this case, he was acquitted on the charge, allegedly because he bribed the jury – the first person to have done so. (This was not easy to do, given that Athenian juries numbered between 200 and 2,000 men.)

=== Relationship with Alcibiades ===
Anytus was reportedly a lover of the young Alcibiades, former ward of Pericles, profligate playboy, and (later) general at Athens. Both Plutarch and Athenaeus described an incident where Anytus was hosting a dinner party during which Alcibiades rudely commandeered half the gold and silver cups at the table and presented them as a gift to Thrasyllus, another of the evening’s guests who was quite poor. When their companions expressed indignation at Alcibiades’s effrontery, Anytus responded that his beloved had not been inconsiderate, but just the opposite, since he had the power to take everything and yet left half behind.

=== Tyranny of the Thirty ===
After the battle of Aigospotami in 405 BC, in which the Athenian fleet was destroyed, the city was besieged by the Spartans and eventually capitulated. The Spartans demanded that the city take down its walls, recall its exiles (oligarchic sympathizers all), and restore the ancient government – i.e., dismantle its democracy. At their "suggestion", a ruling body of thirty governors was selected, mimicking Sparta’s own ruling board of thirty, the gerousia.

At this time many of those opposed to this coup abandoned the city and took refuge in such places as Thebes and Argos. The leader of these democratic partisans was Thrasybulus, and Anytus was among his lieutenants. Lysias, in one of his forensic orations, related an incident where one Agoratus, who had cooperated with the Thirty at first, later tried to join the exiles at Phyle, a fortress in northern Attica where they were organizing a counter coup.

As soon as they saw him they laid hold of him [Agoratus] and dragged him straight away to be killed in the place where they executed ordinary pirates or robbers that fell into their hands. Anytus, who was the general, said that they ought not to do that, on the ground that they were not yet in a position to punish certain of their enemies; at that moment they should rather keep quiet. If ever they returned home, they would then proceed to punish the guilty.

The counter coup was ultimately successful and democracy restored at Athens. One of the means implemented to reconcile the warring parties was a general amnesty, which was resented by many who had lost loved ones and property during the carnage perpetrated by the Thirty. They chafed under the proscription of suing those who had wronged them and occasionally tried to seek recompense in the courts in spite of the law forbidding it. Isocrates wrote the defense speech in one such case and pointed out that certain wealthy and influential men and foregone such suits, even though they had the political pull to succeed in such efforts when ordinary men might fail. He specifically named Thrasyboulus and Anytus as:

men of greatest influence in the city, although they have been robbed of large sums of money and know who gave in lists of their goods, nevertheless are not so brazen as to bring suit against them or to bring up old grudges against them; on the contrary, even if, in respect to all other claims, they have greater power than others to accomplish their ends, yet in matters covered by the covenant at least they see fit to put themselves on terms of equality with the other citizens.

== Trial of Socrates ==
In 399 BC, Anytus joined Meletus and Lycon in bringing an indictment against Socrates. We have two statements that purport to quote the specific charges, one from Plato and another from Diogenes Laertius. In his Apology, Plato had Socrates read out the complaint:

Socrates is guilty of criminal meddling in that he inquires into things below the earth and in the sky, and makes the weaker argument defeat the stronger, and teaches others to follow his example.

Diogenes, on the other hand, wrote:

The affidavit in the case, which is still preserved, says Favorinus, in the Metroon, ran as follows: “This indictment and affidavit is sworn by Meletus, the son of Meletus of Pitthos, against Socrates, the son of Sophroniscus of Alopece: Socrates is guilty of refusing to recognize the gods recognized by the state, and of introducing other new divinities. He is also guilty of corrupting the youth. The penalty demanded is death.”

The discrepancies between these accounts have generated much discussion among modern scholars. As such, the motivation of his accusers has been an issue for modern scholars. Foremost among the explanations proffered was Athens’s recent experience with overthrows and attempted overthrows of its democracy: the coup of the Four Hundred in 411, that of the Thirty in 404, and the attempted reimposition of that oligarchy in 401 by the remnants of the Thirty living at Eleusis. The prejudice against Socrates was not so much about his religious beliefs as about his impact on Athenian politics – namely that he was well known for favoring Spartan society over Athenian and that among the leaders of the coups were men who had spent considerable time with him in their youth. Among the most prominent of these were Theramenes, Critias, and Charmides. As a latter-day democrat, and one who had fought against the Thirty at Phyle and Peiraieus, Anytus would certainly have supported any effort to get rid of persons who directly or indirectly were responsible for these violent attacks on Athens’s government. But in Socrates’s case, he may have had more personal motives. Both Plato and Xenophon related events where enmity between the two men was on display. In Meno Plato constructed a conversation between them where Socrates was exploring the inability of the great men of Athens to pass on their excellence to their sons. Themistocles, Aristeides, Pericles, and Thucydides (son of Melesias, not the historian) were his examples – men whom one would think would have included ethical education among those subjects taught to them. Since they did not, Socrates reluctantly drew the inference that virtue could not be taught. Anytus, however, drew the inference that Socrates was criticizing them (and himself, presumably) for not making the effort.

Socrates, I consider you are too apt to speak ill of people. I, for one, if you will take my advice, would warn you to be careful: in most cities it is probably easier to do people harm than good, and particularly in this one; I think you know that yourself.

Antyus left the conversation at this point, and Socrates said to Meno:

Meno, I think Anytus is angry, and I am not at all surprised: for he conceives, in the first place, that I am speaking ill of these gentlemen; and in the second place, he considers he is one of them himself.

Xenophon provided the background for Anytus’s sensitivity on this issue.

It is said also that [Socrates] remarked as he saw Anytus passing by: “There goes a man who is filled with pride at the thought that he has accomplished some great and noble end in putting me to death, because, seeing him honored by the state with the highest offices, I said that he ought not to confine his son's education to hides [i.e., the tanning business] ...

"At one time I had a brief association with the son of Anytus, and I thought him not lacking in firmness of spirit; and so I predict that he will not continue in the servile occupation that his father has provided for him; but through want of a worthy adviser he will fall into some disgraceful propensity and will surely go far in the career of vice."

In saying this he was not mistaken; the young man, delighting in wine, never left off drinking night or day, and at last turned out worth nothing to his city, his friends, or himself.

Xenophon was not in Athens at this time; he was in Asia on a military campaign, so this is hearsay and probably not a verbatim quote. In this case, it is likely that Anytus lost the affection and respect of his son and blamed Socrates for it – in his eyes, probably sufficient reason to join in his prosecution. The scholiast to Plato’s Apology (18b), cited in note 3 above, provided some additional background:

[Anytus] was rich from his tanning business, for which he was mocked by Socrates. Because of this mockery Anytus persuaded Meletus by bribing him to bring a charge of impiety against Socrates.

Adding all this up, it seems Anytus had both political and personal reasons for wanting Socrates out of the way. As for Meletus’s and Lycon’s motives, we have only what Socrates said about the former in Plato’s Euthyphro:

I am not too clear about the man myself, Euthyphro. He appears to me to be a young man, and unknown. I think however, thet they call him Meletus, and his deme is Pitthos, if you happen to know anyone named Meletus of that deme – a hook-nosed man with long, straight hair, and not much beard ... He says, in fact, that he knows the method by which young people are corrupted, and knows who the persons are that do it ... And so Meletus no doubt begins by clearing us away, the ones who ruin, as he says, the tender shoots of the young... With such a notable beginning, his chances of success look good.

If the scholiast is correct, Meletus’s desire to keep the young from corruption was aided by a little corruptive bribery by Anytus. His “chances of success” were, in the end, in some doubt. In the aftermath of Socrates's conviction and execution, there are stories of the remorse felt by the citizens of Athens and the punishments they meted out on his accusers. Diogenes Laërtius said:

So [Socrates] was taken from among men; and not long afterwards the Athenians felt such remorse that they shut up the training grounds and gymnasia. They banished the other accusers, but put Meletus to death; they honoured Socrates with a bronze statue, the work of Lysippus, which they placed in the hall of processions. And no sooner did Anytus visit Heraclea than the people of that town expelled him on that very day.

In another place, Diogenes credited Antisthenes, the cynic philosopher and former protégé of Socrates, with initiating these reprisals. The 4th century CE orator Themistius went so far as to claim that the people of Heraclea, rather than expel Anytus, stoned him to death on arrival.

These vignettes may simply be the inventions of later apologists for Socrates, for there is evidence that Anytus remained in Athens for some years. The Hellenica Oxyrhinchia places him at a meeting of the Athenian Assembly (Ecclesia) in 397/6 BC and Lysias, in one of his forensic orations, has the speaker call Anytus, who was serving as grain inspector at the time, as a witness in a trial that took place in 388 BC. Both of these events were long after any retribution for his prosecution of Socrates would have been meted out. Furthermore, in 336/5 BC, two men, Anytus (II) and Anthemion (II), of the same deme as our subject, served on the Athenian Council of 500 (Boule). This Anytus also served as trierarch in 323/2 BC. If they were, indeed descendants, it would argue against Anytus I having been forcibly exiled, as his son (and any other issue) would have lost citizenship rights in the process.

== See also ==
- Anytus in Plato's Meno
- List of speakers in Plato's dialogues
