= Meletus =

Athenian and chief accuser of Socrates

Meletus (Ancient Greek: Μέλητος; fl. 5th–4th century BCE), a citizen of Athens in the Classical Era, came from the Pithus deme and has become known for his prosecuting role in the trial – and eventual execution – of the philosopher Socrates in 399 BCE.

== Life ==
Little is known of Meletus' life beyond what is portrayed in the Socratic literature, particularly Plato's dialogues, where he is named as the chief accuser of Socrates. In the Euthyphro, Plato describes Meletus as the youngest of the three prosecutors, having "a beak, and long straight hair, and a beard which is ill grown," and being unknown to Socrates prior to the prosecution. Meletus is also mentioned briefly in the Theaetetus. In Xenophon's Hellenica, he is reported as one of the envoys sent to negotiate a truce with the Lacedaemonians during the war between the democratic rebels and the Thirty Tyrants.

The later Greek historian Diogenes Laërtius reported that after the execution of Socrates "Athenians felt such remorse" that they executed Meletus and banished his associates from the city, at the incitement of a disciple of Socrates, Antisthenes. This claim is generally rejected as apocryphal by modern scholarship.

== Trial of Socrates ==
During the first three hours of the trial, Meletus and the other two accusers each stood in the law court in the centre of Athens to deliver previously crafted speeches to the jury against Socrates. No record of Meletus' speech survives.

== See also ==
- List of speakers in Plato's dialogues
