= Impiety =

Lack of respect for something sacred

Impiety is a perceived lack of proper respect for something considered sacred. Impiety is often closely associated with sacrilege, though it is not necessarily a physical action. Impiety cannot be associated with a cult, as it implies a larger belief system was disrespected. One of the Pagan objections to Christianity was that, unlike other mystery religions, early Christians refused to cast a pinch of incense before the images of the gods, an impious act in their eyes. Impiety in ancient civilizations was a civic concern, rather than solely religious (as religions were tied into the state). It was believed that impious actions such as disrespect towards sacred objects or priests could bring down the wrath of the gods.

== Ancient Greece ==
The issue of impiety in antiquity is controversial because of the anecdotal nature of extant sources. A number of Athenian men, including Alcibiades, were sentenced to death for impiety in 415 BC, most of whom fled Athens before execution (Andocides was later charged in 400 or 399 BC in reference to these events). Most famously, the philosopher Socrates was executed for impiety (as well as corrupting Athenian youth) in 399 BC. An Athenian philosopher Anaxagoras taught that the sun and the stars were fiery stones whose heat we did not feel because of their distance, and was allegedly accused of impiety in Athens. Diagoras of Melos was reportedly accused of atheism and had to flee Athens after being charged with impiety for revealing the content of the Eleusinian Mysteries to the uninitiated. Philosophers Aristotle and Theophrastus might have been accused of impiety as well. Phryne was put on trial for impiety and was defended by the orator Hypereides; she was acquitted.

== See also ==
- Blasphemy
- Pietism
- Sacrilege
