= John E. Hare =

British philosopher and ethicist

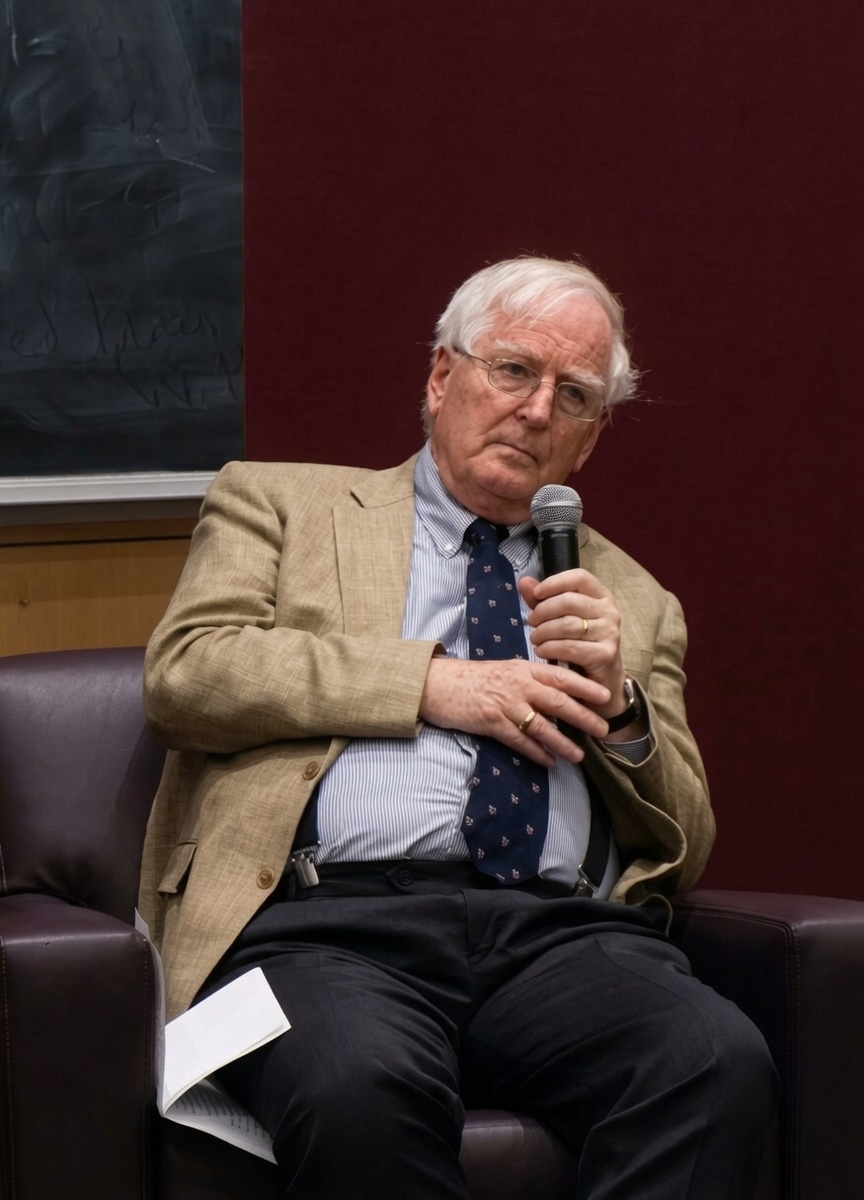
- Born: John Edmund Hare; 26 July 1949 (age 77)
- Father: R. M. Hare

Education
- Education: Balliol College, Oxford (BA, 1971); Princeton University (PhD, 1975)

Philosophical work
- Era: Contemporary philosophy
- Region: Western philosophy
- School: Analytic philosophy, Christian philosophy
- Institutions: Yale Divinity School; Calvin College; Lehigh University
- Main interests: Divine command theory, Kantian ethics, philosophical theology, ancient philosophy, medical ethics
- Notable ideas: The "moral gap" Trinitarian ethics

John Edmund Hare (born 26 July 1949) is a British classicist, philosopher, and ethicist, and the Noah Porter Professor Emeritus of Philosophical Theology at Yale University. He held the Noah Porter chair from 2003 until his retirement in 2023, with concurrent appointments in Yale's departments of Classics, Philosophy, and Religious Studies.

The son of the British utilitarian philosopher R. M. Hare, John Hare has worked on an ethical theory that integrates Kantian deontological ethics with divine command theory. Unlike his father's secular philosophy, Hare's work is specifically Christian and grounds moral obligation in God's authority. He is best known for his concept of the "moral gap"—the distance between the ethical demand placed on human beings and their natural capacity to meet it—and for his trilogy of works on ethics and Trinitarian theology: The Moral Gap (1996), God's Command (2015), and Unity and the Holy Spirit (2023).

The author of over sixty articles in scholarly journals, Hare has worked on ancient philosophy, medieval Franciscan philosophy, Immanuel Kant, Søren Kierkegaard, contemporary ethical theory, the theory of the atonement, medical ethics, international relations, and aesthetics. He is a published composer of liturgical compositions for choir and organ.

== Early life and family ==
Hare was born on 26 July 1949 in the United Kingdom. His father was R. M. Hare (1919–2002), a leading post-war moral philosopher at Oxford University and one of the foremost proponents of prescriptivism and utilitarianism in British analytic philosophy. His mother, Catherine Verney, came from an ancient English family; Hare's middle name Edmund is drawn from his ancestor Sir Edmund Verney, standard-bearer for King Charles I at the Battle of Edgehill in 1642.

Hare grew up in the village of Ewelme, Oxfordshire, where his mother directed the church choir and worked as a piano teacher, and where his father taught at Oxford. He held music scholarships at Rugby School and later at Balliol College, Oxford. He worked as a teacher at Tyndale Biscoe School in Kashmir, India, from 1966 to 1967.

== Education ==
Hare received a Bachelor of Arts with honours in Literae Humaniores from Balliol College, Oxford in 1971. He then moved to the United States to study at Princeton University, where he completed a PhD in classical philosophy under the supervision of Gregory Vlastos in 1975. He chose Princeton in part to establish a professional identity independent of his father's prominent position in British philosophy.

== Career ==
=== Lehigh University (1975–1989) ===
Hare was a visiting assistant professor at the University of Michigan in 1975 before joining the faculty of Lehigh University as a professor of philosophy, a position he held from 1975 to 1989. He was also a visiting fellow in the humanities at the Medical College of Pennsylvania from 1978 to 1981. He served on the staff of the United States House Committee on Foreign Affairs from 1982 to 1983, and was a Congressional Fellow of the American Philosophical Association from 1981 to 1982. He received the Junior Lindback Award for Distinguished Teaching in 1981 and was elected an honorary member of Phi Beta Kappa in 1979.

During this period Hare published his first book, a commentary on Plato's Euthyphro (1985), and his second book, The Moral Gap (1996), which broke new ground in Kant scholarship by recovering the theological dimensions of Kant's moral philosophy.

=== Calvin College (1989–2003) ===
In 1989, Hare moved to Calvin College in Grand Rapids, Michigan, where he served as Professor of Philosophy until 2003. At Calvin, a Christian Reformed institution, he began writing extensively on theologically grounded ethics, particularly divine command theory, and held the Pew Evangelical Fellowship from 1991 to 1992. He held the senior fellowship at the Center for Philosophy of Religion at the University of Notre Dame from 1998 to 1999, and was a Calvin Lecturer (1999–2000) and Stob Lecturer (1999). He was the recipient of the Institute for Advanced Christian Studies Book Prize in 1997.

=== Yale University (2003–2023) ===
In 2003, Hare was appointed Noah Porter Professor of Philosophical Theology at Yale Divinity School, a position he held for two decades until his formal retirement in 2023. He held concurrent appointments in Yale's departments of Classics, Philosophy, and Religious Studies, and was a fellow of Berkeley College. He served on the boards of the Yale Center for Bioethics, the Yale Center for Faith and Culture, and Berkeley Divinity School.

He was selected to deliver the Gifford Lectures at the University of Glasgow in 2005, and was a Plantinga Lecturer in 2008. He again held the senior fellowship at the Center for Philosophy of Religion at Notre Dame from 2008 to 2009.

Upon his retirement in April 2023, colleagues and former students gathered at Yale for a two-day conference entitled "Moral Theory and the Trinity," organized to coincide with the completion of his Trinitarian trilogy and the publication of Unity and the Holy Spirit.

== Philosophical work ==
=== The moral gap ===
The central concept of Hare's philosophy is the "moral gap" — the distance between the high ethical demand placed on human beings and their natural capacity to meet it. Drawing on his reading of Kant, Hare argues that Kant's moral philosophy has a "gap structure": the divine demand is extraordinarily high, human natural capacities are insufficient to meet it, and consequently God's assistance is required to bridge the gap. Hare contends that Kant's moral theology is not peripheral but central to his thought, and that without the theological dimension Kant's ethics loses its coherence.

In The Moral Gap: Kantian Ethics, Human Limits, and God's Assistance (Oxford University Press, 1996), Hare examines the responses of various philosophers to this gap and argues that it is ultimately unbridgeable apart from religion. The book was received as a landmark contribution to the philosophical interpretation of Kant.

=== Trinitarian trilogy ===
Hare's major scholarly achievement is a trilogy of works that develops an ethical theory structured around the Trinity:

- The Moral Gap (OUP, 1996) addresses the work of the Second Person of the Trinity — Jesus Christ — exploring the doctrines of atonement and justification and their implications for ethics.
- God's Command (OUP, 2015) addresses the work of the First Person of the Trinity, defending a version of divine command theory and arguing that what makes something morally obligatory is that God commands it. The book engages with Karl Barth and examines divine command within Judaism and Islam, as well as with evolutionary psychology.
- Unity and the Holy Spirit (OUP, 2023) addresses the work of the Third Person of the Trinity, arguing that the Holy Spirit works to bring about four kinds of unity: between humans and the material world, within individual human lives, between persons, and between humans and God.

=== Divine command theory ===
Hare is one of the foremost contemporary defenders of divine command theory, the position that moral obligations derive from God's commands. In God's Call (Eerdmans, 2001), he discusses divine command theory with attention to texts in Duns Scotus, Kant, and contemporary moral theory, and argues against J. B. Schneewind's secularized reading of Kant's philosophy. In God's Command (2015), he defends a prescriptive realist version of divine command theory, arguing that moral obligations are not merely subjective expressions but real prescriptions rooted in divine authority, and that this framework is compatible with human moral autonomy.

=== Philosophical history of ethics ===
In God and Morality: A Philosophical History (Blackwell, 2007), Hare evaluates the ethical theories of Aristotle, Duns Scotus, Immanuel Kant, and R. M. Hare, arguing that these four figures — representing virtue theory, divine command theory, deontology, and consequentialism respectively — share deeper theological premises than is typically acknowledged. Hare contends that their ethical theories are less opposed to one another than they appear when their original theological contexts are recovered.

== Personal life ==
Hare describes his lifelong project as an attempt to reconcile the deep personal piety of his mother and his father's commitment to the life of philosophical reason. He is a published composer of liturgical music for choir and organ, and has taught courses in theological aesthetics, using music — including works of Beethoven — to illustrate philosophical concepts. Following his retirement, he expressed an intention to write a non-academic book for "fellow pilgrims," inspired by walking a portion of the Camino de Santiago with his sister.

== Selected bibliography ==
=== Books ===
- Ethics and International Affairs, with Carey B. Joynt (The Macmillan Press, 1982). ISBN 978-0-333-27853-6
- Plato's Euthyphro (Thomas Library, Bryn Mawr College, 1985). ISBN 978-0-929524-25-2
- The Moral Gap: Kantian Ethics, Human Limits, and God's Assistance (New York: Oxford University Press, 1996). ISBN 0-19-826957-9
- God's Call: Moral Realism, God's Commands, and Human Autonomy (Grand Rapids, Michigan: Eerdmans, 2001). ISBN 0-8028-4997-0
- Why Bother Being Good? The Place of God in the Moral Life (Downers Grove, Ill.: InterVarsity Press, 2002). ISBN 0-8308-2683-1
- God and Morality: A Philosophical History (Malden, Mass.: Blackwell Publishing, 2007). ISBN 0-631-23607-4
- God's Command (Oxford: Oxford University Press, 2015). ISBN 978-0-19-960201-8
- Unity and the Holy Spirit (Oxford: Oxford University Press, 2023). ISBN 978-0-19-289084-9

== Awards and fellowships ==
- Junior Lindback Award for Distinguished Teaching, Lehigh University, 1981
- Honorary member, Phi Beta Kappa, 1979
- Congressional Fellow, American Philosophical Association, 1981–82
- Pew Evangelical Fellowship, 1991–92
- Institute for Advanced Christian Studies Book Prize, 1997
- Senior Fellow, Center for Philosophy of Religion, University of Notre Dame, 1998–99 and 2008–09
- Calvin Lecturer, 1999–2000
- Stob Lecturer, 1999
- Gifford Lecturer, University of Glasgow, 2005
- Plantinga Lecturer, 2008
