= Stoa Basileios =

Ancient stoa in Athens

Coordinates: 37.9761°N 23.7223°E

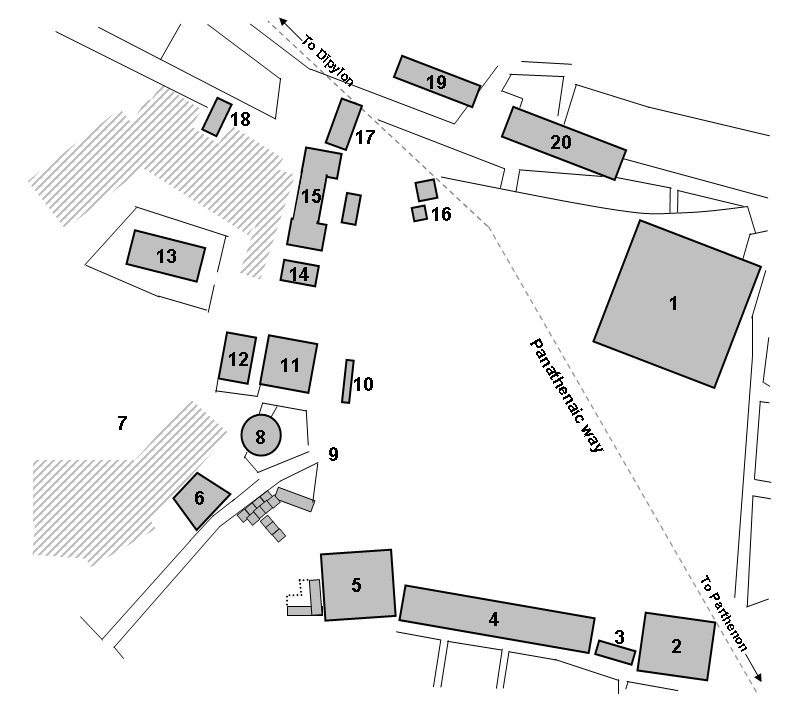
Plan of the Athenian Agora in the fifth century BC; the Royal Stoa is no. 17

Stoa Basileios (Ancient Greek: στοὰ βασίλειος), meaning Royal Stoa, was a Doric stoa in the northwestern corner of the Athenian Agora, which was built in the 6th century BC, substantially altered in the 5th century BC, and then carefully preserved until the mid-second century AD. It is among the smallest known Greek stoas, but had great symbolic significance as the seat of the Athenian King Archon, repository of Athens' laws, and site of "the stone" on which incoming magistrates swore their oath of office.

== Description ==
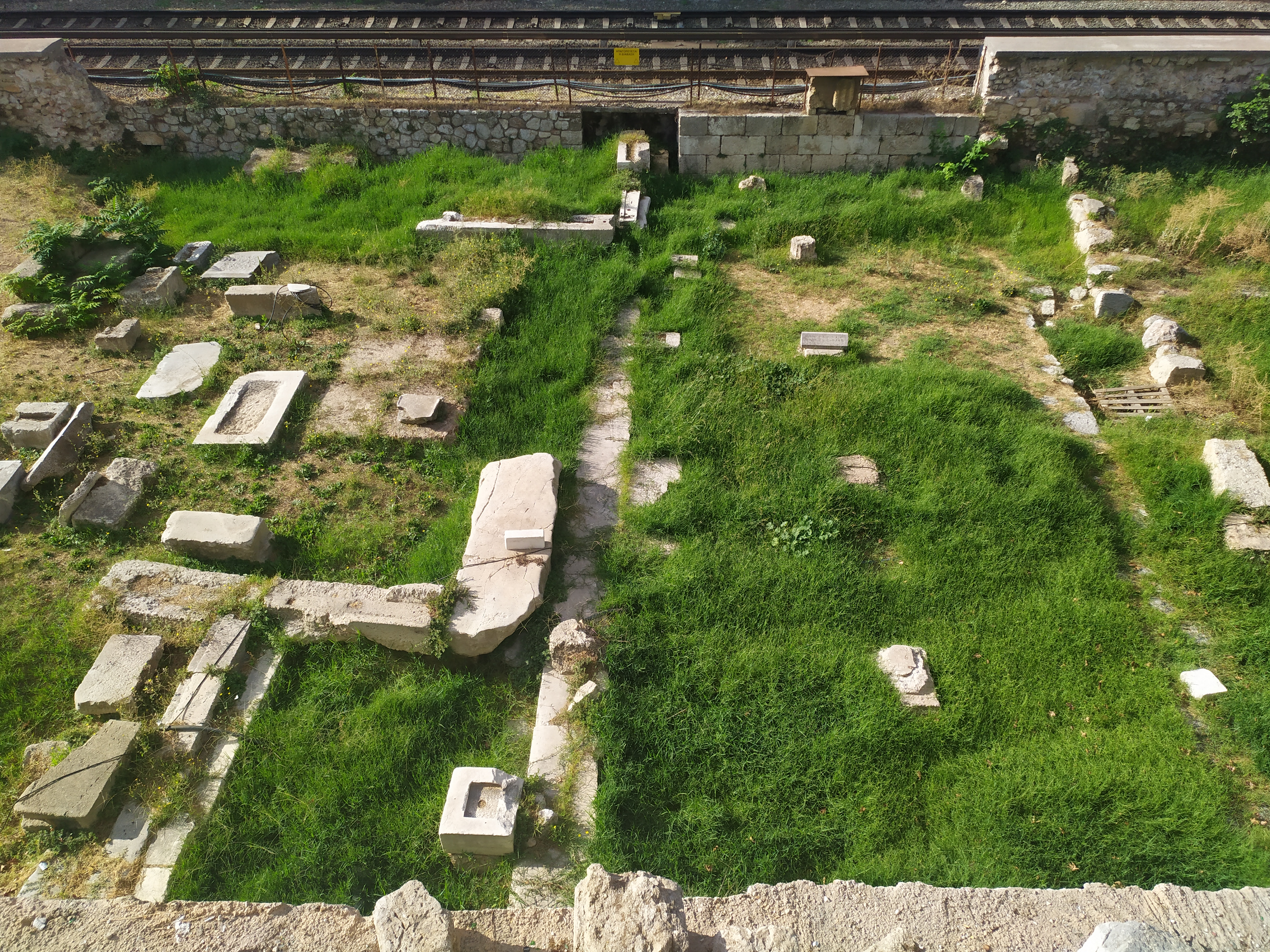
Remains of the Stoa Basileios in the Athenian Agora (looking south); the lithos is located left of centre

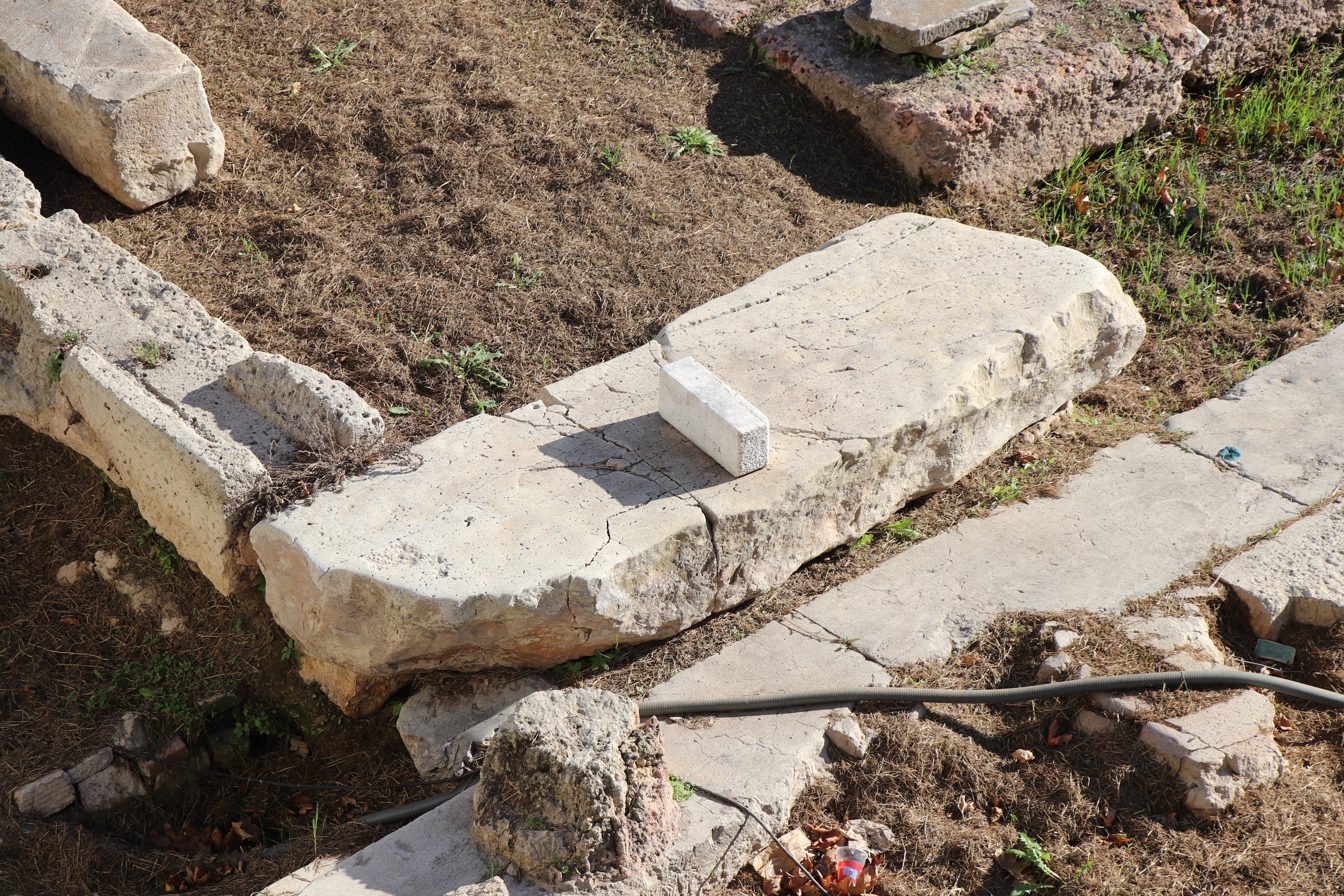
The lithos.

The stoa was in the northwest corner of the Athenian Agora, an area known in ancient times as "the Herms" because of the great number of herms set up there (fragments of 19 of these herms have been found). It sat just south of the point where the Panathenaic Way and another street enter the Agora and exactly one metre north of the Stoa of Zeus. The identification of the archaeological remains with the Stoa Basileios known from literary sources is clear from descriptions of it in literary sources, especially the 2nd-century AD travel-writer Pausanias.

The Stoa was built in the Doric order, with solid walls on the north, west, and east sides and a colonnade of eight columns along the eastern side, facing towards the open space of the Agora. It measures 17.72 metres long from north to south and 7.18 metres wide from east to west, making it one of the smallest known Greek stoas. The roof was tiled with terracotta. The façade carried a plain Doric frieze with poros triglyphs and metopes which were probably made of marble. The columns were made of soft yellow poros covered in stucco. The drums had a diameter of 0.58 metres and the distance from the centre of one column to the next was 1.9205 metres. On top of the steps, between the second and fourth columns from the northern end of the Stoa is a large block of tan limestone, which is probably "the Stone" (ho lithos) used for oaths. It seems to be a repurposed lintel block from a Mycenaean tholos tomb.

Inside, there were initially two columns on the building's internal axis, which supported the ridge pole of the roof. A low stone platform ran along the interior north, west, and south walls. There may have been further benches inside the colonnade. The north wall was made of ashlar blocks and is preserved to a height of 1.20 metres. The west (back) wall was made of polygonal masonry and survives only as foundations. The south wall was inadvertently destroyed during the construction of the Athens-Piraeus railroad in the 19th century. The walls and colonnade stood on a two-step crepidoma, but the internal floor was just packed clay.

=== History ===
Several features of the stoa indicate that it was originally built in the Archaic period: its small scale, the use of poros instead of marble, the presence of a Z-shaped metal clamp in the walls, and the polygonal masonry. The style of the column capitals is similar to those of the Hekatompedon temple on the Acropolis and the Temple of Apollo at Corinth, suggesting a date in the mid-6th century BC. Ceramic finds in the foundation indicate a date after 575-550 BC.

In the 440s BC, the stoa was renovated. The roof was retiled and the two internal columns were replaced with a row of four Doric columns, located 3.2 metres apart, each with a diameter of 0.42 metres. A set of terracotta acroteria were added at this time, fragments of which have been found (inv. T 1261 and T 3987). Pausanias says that they depicted Theseus throwing Sciron into the sea and Hemera (Day) abducting Cephalus. At the end of the fifth century, two small porches were added to the front side at either end, each supported by five unfluted columns (three in front and one on each side). The two porches were not symmetrical, the roof of the southern porch was higher than the northern and it may have had Ionic columns rather than the Doric ones used in the rest of the structure. Broad stelae were set up between the columns of the south porch and in parallel inside the north porch. Fragments of these stelae survive; they bear a copy of the Athenian law on homicide (OR 183A) and two versions of a calendar of Athens' public sacrifices (AIO 1185 and 1189).

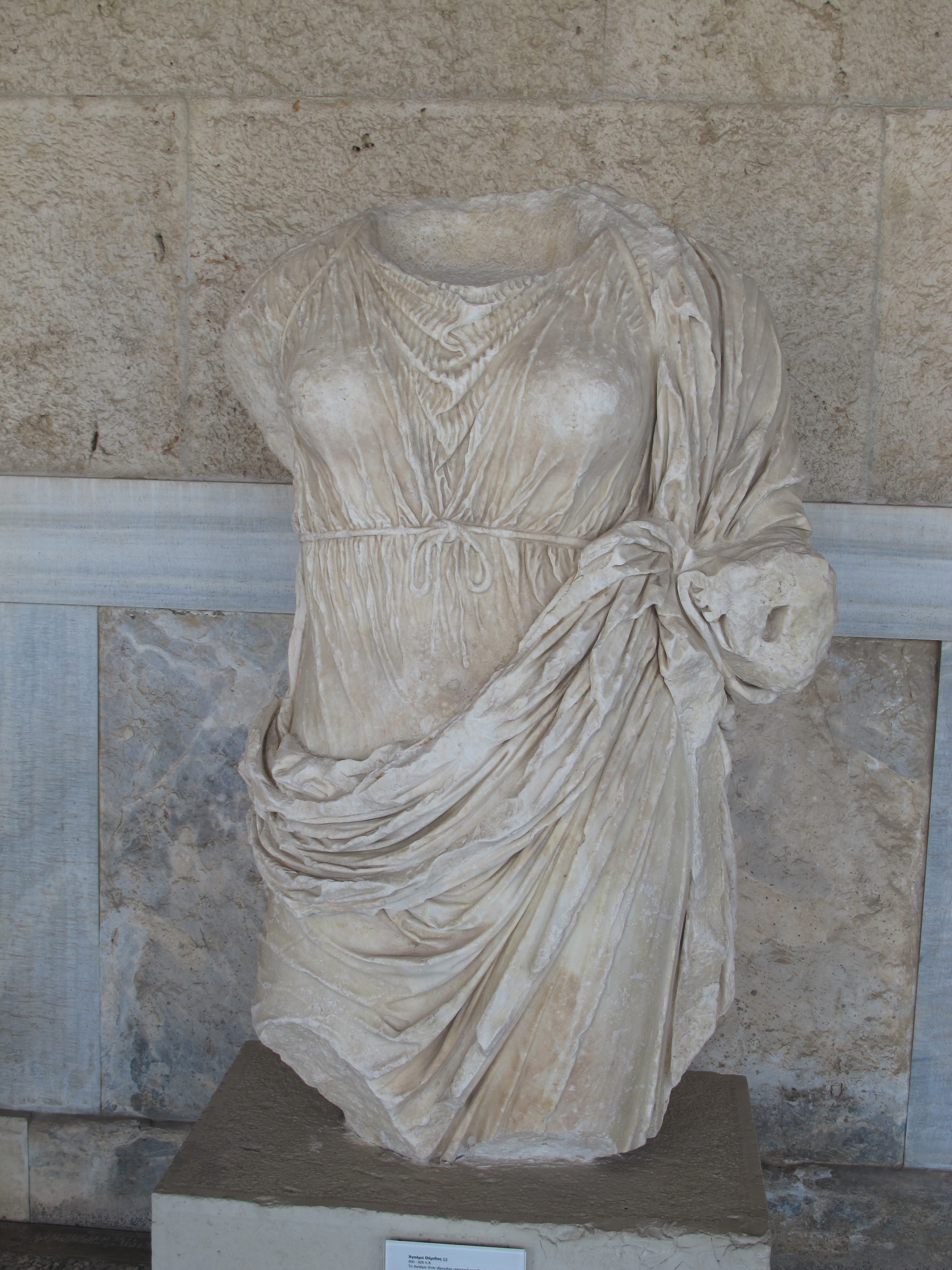
Torso of S 2370, colossal female statue, probably of Themis ("Justice"), which stood in front of the Stoa Basileios from the 330s BC.

Statue bases and decrees continued to be erected around the stoa in the fourth century BC, beginning with statues of Conon, Timotheus, and King Euagoras of Cyprus. A letter attributed to Aeschines reports that there was a statue of Pindar as well. A conglomerate base for a very large statue is located directly in front of the Stoa and aligned with it. It measures 2.75 x 2.03 metres and ceramic evidence indicates a fourth century BC date. This may have been for a colossal female statue (S 2370) of Pentelic marble that was found nearby, built into a Byzantine house. This statue is missing its head, legs, and arms, but is still 1.54 metres high; originally it would have been nearly three metres tall. It wears a chiton, girdle, and himation and originally held a long metal object in its left arm, probably a sceptre, spear, key, or measuring stick. Stylistic analysis suggests a date around 335-330 BC, It may depict Themis (the personification of justice and good order) or Agathe Tyche ("Good Luck"); an alternative identification as Democratia (Democracy) has been ruled out. Copies of this statue are known from elsewhere in Athens, Pamphylia, Roman Egypt, and Leptis Magna. The statue of Themis at Rhamnous was probably based in part on this statue.

In the Hellenistic period, the ground level in the Agora slowly rose, so the area in front of the stoa was enclosed by a low wall, creating a small precinct around the building where the original ground level was preserved. The Stoa was severely burnt by Roman soldiers during the Sullan Sack of Athens in 86 BC. After this, the building was carefully repaired and the walls were covered with stucco to hide the fire damage. It probably remained in use until the Herulian Sack in 267 AD. Much of the stone was subsequently spoliated for use in other construction.

== Function ==
The Stoa Basileios was the headquarters of the King Archon (basileus), who was responsible for organising various festivals, conducting some sacrifices on behalf of the city, and hearing the initial indictments for some types of lawsuit. In the 5th century BC, the Areopagos council (in charge of religious affairs and murder trials) sometimes met in the Stoa as well and a rope would be set up to keep people from interrupting its proceedings.

The building was closely associated with law and justice. The laws of Draco and Solon written on wooden pillars called axones and kyrbeis were probably moved to the Stoa by Ephialtes in the 460s BC, perhaps on the low platforms on the inside walls. When the laws were revised at the end of the fifth century BC, inscribed copies of them were erected in the porches at the ends of the Stoa. The limestone block located on the steps of the Stoa is probably to be identified with "the stone" (ho lithos) mentioned by Aristotle, Plutarch, and Julius Pollux, who explain that Athens' nine annual archons (the eponymous archon, King Archon, Polemarch, and Thesmothetai) swore their oaths of office on it, as did official arbitrators, and witnesses in trials.

After the suppression of a revolt in Chalcis in 446 BC, the Athenians confiscated the Chalcideans' land and leased it out. The contracts were inscribed on stelae in the Stoa.

In the Classical and Hellenistic periods, the King Archons often dedicated herms in and around the Stoa. Several bases have survived, three of which are inscribed with the names of their dedicators (IG II^{3} 4 41, 95, and 113).

Since the King Archon was responsible for trials on religious matters, it was at the Stoa Basileios that Socrates was formally charged with impiety by Meletus. Plato's Euthyphro, a dialogue between Socrates and Euthyphro about the nature of piety, is set in front of the Stoa.

According to Philostratus, an overturned statue near the Stoa was knocked over by an evil spirit in the late first century AD, when it was exorcised by the holy man Apollonius of Tyana.

== Excavation ==
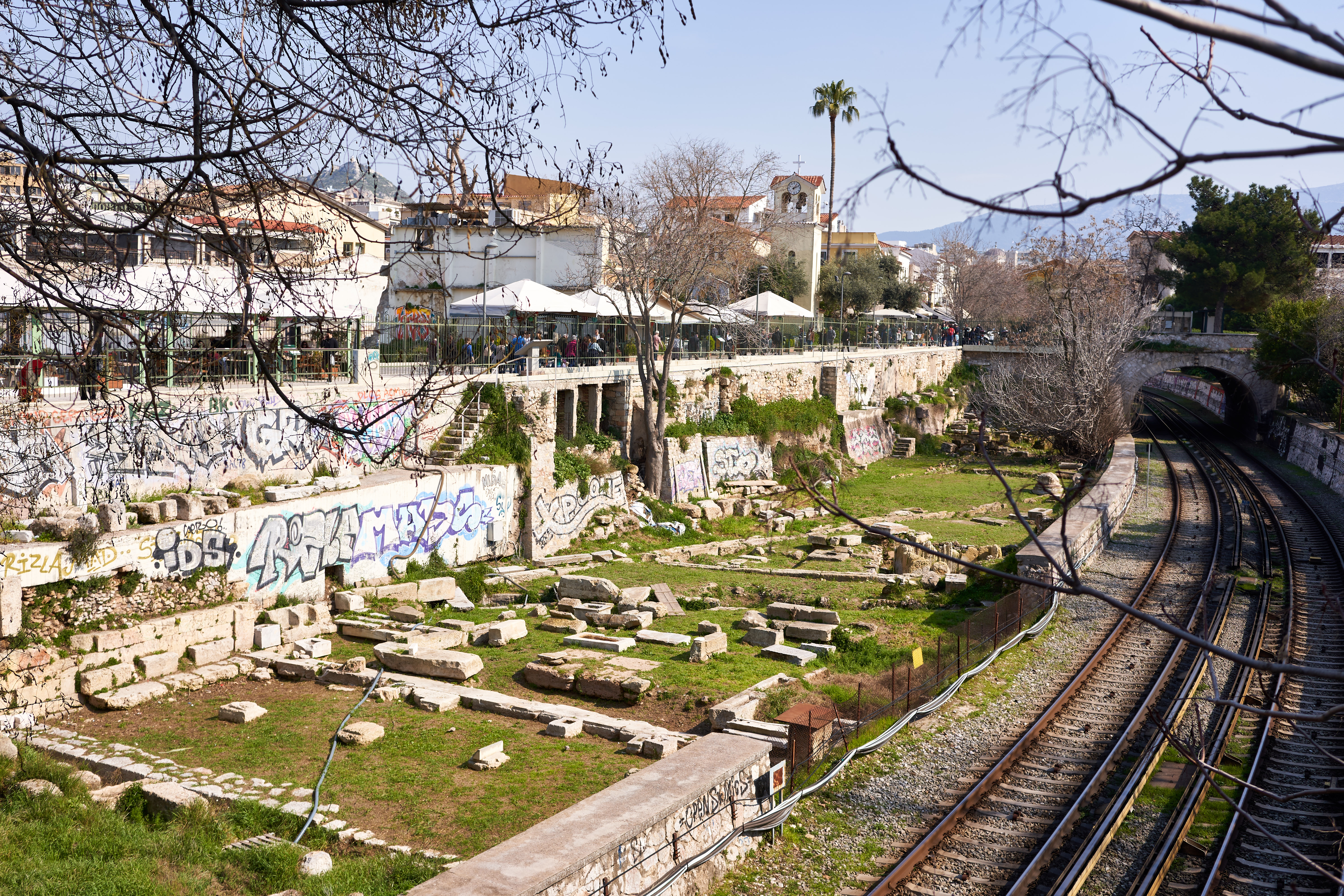
View of the Stoa Basileios from the southwest, looking across the Athens-Piraeus Electric Railway.

The stoa was outside the area of the original excavations of the Athenian Agora by the American School of Classical Studies at Athens, being north of the Athens-Piraeus Electric Railway. In 1969, the Greek government expropriated the houses in the area and added them to the American concession. The Americans uncovered the stoa in 1970, under the supervision of Stella Grobel Miller, with funding from the Ford Foundation. The results were published by the overall head of excavations, T. Leslie Shear, Jr.

During a 1974 excavation, a lead tablet was discovered. The tablet was a letter written by Lesis, a slave, who complains of being mistreated by the master of the foundry. It is one of the few recorded instances of slave literacy.

== Bibliography ==
- Martin, Roland M. (1942). "La Stoa Basileios. Portiques à ailes et lieux d'assemblée". Bulletin de correspondance hellénique (in French). 66–67: 276. doi:10.3406/bch.1942.2649.
- Wycherley, R. E. (1957). The Athenian Agora III: Literary and Epigraphical Testimonia. Princeton, New Jersey: American School of Classical Studies at Athens. JSTOR 3601955.
- Shear, T. Leslie (1971). "The Athenian Agora: Excavations of 1970". Hesperia: The Journal of the American School of Classical Studies at Athens. 40 (3): 241–279. doi:10.2307/147527. ISSN 0018-098X. JSTOR 147527.
- Dinsmoor, William Bell; Anderson, William James (1973). The Architecture of Ancient Greece: An Account of Its Historic Development. Biblo & Tannen Publishers. ISBN 978-0-8196-0283-1.
- Lang, Mabel L. (1978). Socrates in the Agora. American School of Classical Studies at Athens. ISBN 978-0-87661-617-8.
- Palagia, Olga (1982). "A Colossal Statue of a Personification from the Agora of Athens". Hesperia: The Journal of the American School of Classical Studies at Athens. 51 (1): 99–113. doi:10.2307/147855. ISSN 0018-098X. JSTOR 147855.
- Camp, John McK (1986). The Athenian Agora: excavations in the heart of classical Athens. New York, N.Y. (500 Fifth Ave., New York 10110): Thames and Hudson. ISBN 9780500276839.
- Robertson, Noel (1999). "The Stoa of the Herms". Zeitschrift für Papyrologie und Epigraphik. 127: 167–172. ISSN 0084-5388. JSTOR 20190485.
- Palagia, Olga (1994). "No Demokratia". In Coulson, William D. E. (ed.). The Archaeology of Athens and Attica Under the Democracy: Proceedings of an International Conference Celebrating 2500 Years Since the Birth of Democracy in Greece, Held at the American School of Classical Studies at Athens, December 4-6, 1992. Oxbow Books. pp. 113–122. ISBN 978-0-946897-67-4.
- Anderson, Greg (2003). The Athenian Experiment: Building an Imagined Political Community in Ancient Attica, 508-490 B.C. University of Michigan Press. p. 98. ISBN 978-0-472-11320-0.
- Camp, John McK.; Mauzy, Craig A. (2010). The Athenian Agora: Site Guide (5th ed.). American School of Classical Studies at Athens. ISBN 978-1-62139-016-9.
- Sickinger, James P. (1 February 2018). Public Records and Archives in Classical Athens. University of North Carolina Press. ISBN 978-0-8078-6116-5.
