= Agnaptus =

Ancient Greek architect

- Occupation: Architect
- Known for: Build the stoa at Altis

Agnaptus (Ancient Greek: Ἀγνάπτος) was an ancient Greek architect mentioned by Pausanias as the builder of a stoa, or porch, in the Altis at Olympia, which was called by the Eleans the "porch of Agnaptus" (Ἀγνάπτου στοᾷ). When he lived is uncertain.
