= Divine command theory =

Meta-ethical theory of morality

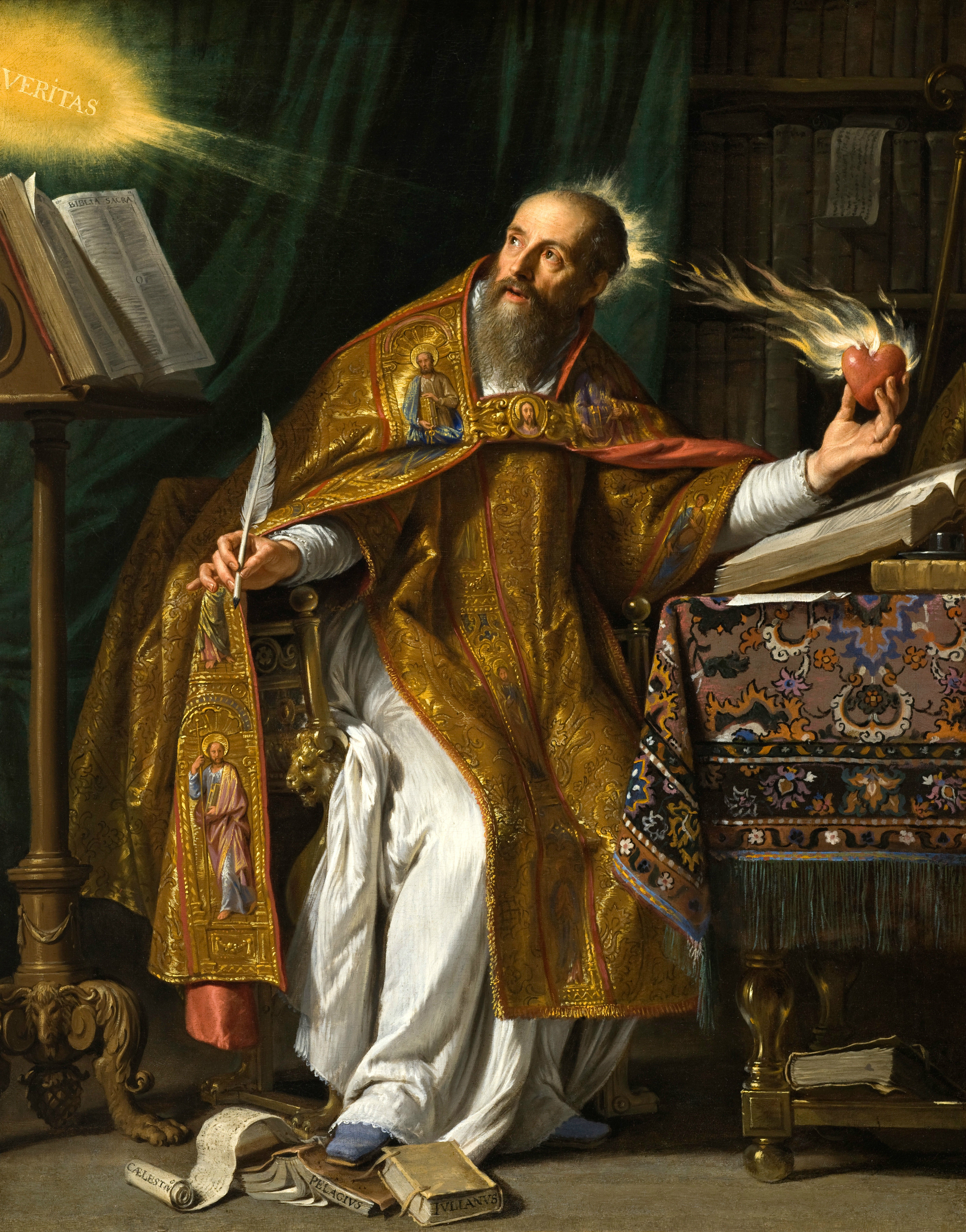
Portrait of Saint Augustine, the oldest proponent of the Divine command theory

Divine command theory (also known as theological voluntarism) is a meta-ethical theory which proposes that an action's status as morally good is equivalent to whether it is commanded by God. The theory asserts that what is moral is determined by God's commands and that for a person to be moral he is to follow God's commands. Followers of both monotheistic and polytheistic religions in ancient and modern times have often accepted the importance of God's commands in establishing morality.

Numerous variants of the theory have been presented: historically, figures including Saint Augustine, Duns Scotus, William of Ockham and Søren Kierkegaard have presented various versions of divine command theory; more recently, Robert Merrihew Adams has proposed a "modified divine command theory" based on the omnibenevolence of God in which morality is linked to human conceptions of right and wrong. Paul Copan has argued in favour of the theory from a Christian viewpoint, and Linda Trinkaus Zagzebski's divine motivation theory proposes that God's motivations, rather than commands, are the source of morality.

Semantic challenges to divine command theory have been proposed; the philosopher William Wainwright argued that to be commanded by God and to be morally obligatory do not have an identical meaning, which he believed would make defining obligation difficult. He also contended that, as knowledge of God is required for morality by divine command theory, atheists and agnostics could not be moral; he saw this as a weakness of the theory. Others have challenged the theory on modal grounds by arguing that, even if God's command and morality correlate in this world, they may not do so in other possible worlds. In addition, the Euthyphro dilemma, first proposed by Plato (in the context of polytheistic Greek religion), presented a dilemma which threatened either to result in the moral arbitrariness of morality itself, or to result in the irrelevance of God to morality. Divine command theory has also been criticised for its apparent incompatibility with the omnibenevolence of God, moral autonomy and religious pluralism, although some scholars have defended the theory from these challenges.

== General form ==
Although "divine command" is the standard term in the literature, God addresses people in all sorts of ways. The scholastics distinguished between five different forms of God's revealed will, and they can be summarized in a Latin dactylic hexameter, "Praecipit et prohibet, permittit, consultit, implet". Praecipit means "gives precepts to". Precepts tell people to do something. They can include warning, admonishment or exhortation. Prohibet means "prohibits". A prohibition is a command not to do something. Permittit means "permits". A permission is not a command because a person is permitted both to do the thing and not to do it. Consultit means "counsels". They can include advice, instruction or invitation. They are different from commands as the latter generally generate obligation, and there is normally some expectation of condemnation if the command is not carried out. Finally, implet means "fulfils", which are directly effective commands. They do not need language-using human recipients. An example is "Let there be light", and there is light. Sometimes "command" is taken to mean the whole family of speech acts, but sometimes it only includes those prescriptions which generate obligation.

Philosophers including St Augustine (354–430), Duns Scotus (c. 1265–1308), William of Ockham (c. 1287–1347), and John Calvin (1509–1564) have presented various forms of divine command theory. The theory generally teaches that moral truth does not exist independently of God and that divine commands determine morality. Stronger versions of the theory assert that God's command is the only reason that a good action is moral, while weaker variations cast divine command as a vital component within a greater reason. The theory asserts that good actions are morally good as a result of divine command, and many religious believers subscribe to some form of divine command theory. Because of these premises, adherents believe that moral obligation is obedience to God's commands; what is morally right is what God desires.

Divine command theory features in the ethics of many contemporary religions – including Judaism, Islam, the Bahá'í Faith, and Christianity – as well as featuring in numerous polytheistic religions. In ancient Athens, citizens commonly held that moral truth was tied directly to divine commands, and religious piety was almost equivalent to morality. Although Christianity does not entail divine command theory, people commonly associate the two. DCT can be a plausible theory to Christians because the traditional conception of God as the creator of the universe parallels the idea that he created moral truths. The theory is supported by the Christian view that God is all-powerful because this implies that God creates moral truths, rather than moral truths existing independently of him, which seems inconsistent with his omnipotence.

=== Augustine ===
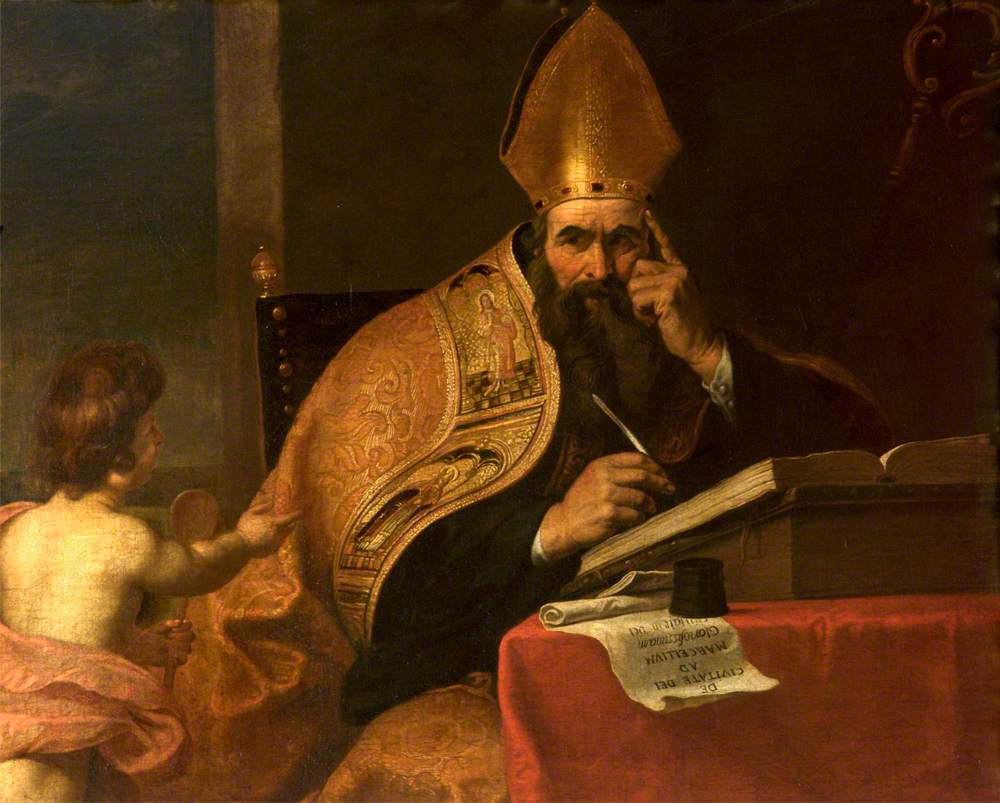
The Four Doctors of the Western Church, Saint Augustine of Hippo (354–430), Gerard Seghers

Saint Augustine offered a version of divine command theory that began by casting ethics as the pursuit of the supreme good, which delivers human happiness. He argued that to achieve this happiness, humans must love objects that are worthy of human love in the correct manner; this requires humans to love God, which then allows them to correctly love that which is worthy of being loved. Augustine's ethics proposed that the act of loving God enables humans to properly orient their loves, leading to human happiness and fulfilment. Augustine supported Plato's view that a well-ordered soul is a desirable consequence of morality. However, unlike Plato, he believed that achieving a well-ordered soul had a higher purpose: living in accordance with God's commands. His view of morality was thus heteronomous, as he believed in deference to a higher authority (God), rather than acting autonomously.

=== John Duns Scotus ===
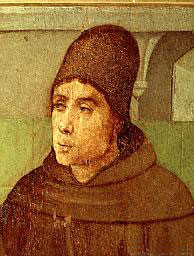
John Duns Scotus, who proposed a variant of divine command theory

Scholastic philosopher John Duns Scotus argued that the only moral obligations that God could not take away from humans involve loving God, as God is, definitionally, the most loveable thing. Scotus argued that the natural law, in the strictest sense, contains only what is self-evidently analytically true and that God could not make these statements false. This means that the commands of natural law do not depend on God's will, and thus form the first three commandments of the Ten Commandments. The last seven of the Ten Commandments do not belong to the natural law in the strictest sense. Whilst humanity's duties to God are self-evident, true by definition, and unchangeable even by God, mankind's duties to others (found on the second tablet) fundamentally derived from the will by God and are within his power to revoke and replace (although, the third commandment, to honour the Sabbath and keep it holy, has a little of both, as humanity is absolutely obliged to render worship to God, but there is no obligation in natural law to do it on this day or that). Scotus does note, however that the last seven commandments:

...are highly consonant with [the natural law], though they do not follow necessarily from first practical principles that are known in virtue of their terms and are necessarily known by any intellect that understands their terms. And it is certain that all the precepts of the second table belong to the natural law in this second way, since their rectitude is highly consonant with first practical principles that are known necessarily.

Scotus justifies this position with the example of a peaceful society, noting that the possession of private property is not necessary to have a peaceful society, but that "those of weak character" would be more easily made peaceful with private property than without. Hence, the last seven commandments do belong to the natural law, but not in the strictest sense, as they belong to the natural law by rectitude rather than by definition.

=== Thomas Aquinas ===
Whilst Thomas Aquinas, as a natural law theorist, is generally seen as holding that morality is not willed by God, Kelly James Clark and Anne Poortenga have presented a defence of divine command theory based on Aquinas' moral theory. Aquinas proposed a theory of natural law which asserted that something is moral if it works towards the purpose of human existence, and so human nature can determine what is moral. Clark and Poortenga argued that God created human nature and thus commanded a certain morality; hence he cannot arbitrarily change what is right or wrong for humans.

=== Immanuel Kant ===
The deontological ethics of Immanuel Kant has been cast as rejecting divine command theory by several figures, among whom is ethicist R. M. Hare. Kant's view that morality should be determined by the categorical imperative – duty to the moral law, rather than acting for a specific end – has been viewed as incompatible with divine command theory. Philosopher and theologian John E. Hare has noted that some philosophers see divine command theory as an example of Kant's heteronomous will – motives besides the moral law, which Kant regarded as non-moral. American philosopher Lewis White Beck takes Kant's argument to be a refutation of the theory that morality depends on divine authority. John E. Hare challenges this view, arguing that Kantian ethics should be seen as compatible with divine command theory.

=== Robert Adams ===
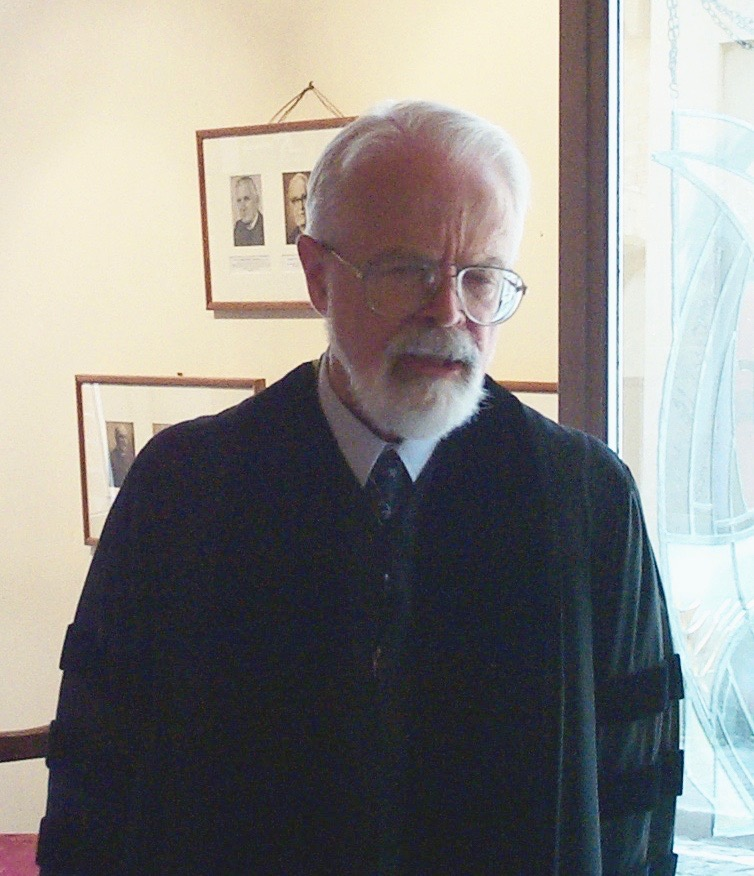
Robert Merrihew Adams proposes what he calls a "modified divine command theory".

American philosopher Robert Merrihew Adams proposes what he calls a "modified divine command theory". Adams presents the basic form of his theory by asserting that two statements are equivalent:

1. It is wrong to do X.
2. It is contrary to God's commands to do X.

He proposes that God's commands precede moral truths and must be explained in terms of moral truths, not the other way around. Adams writes that his theory is an attempt to define what being ethically 'wrong' consists of and accepts that it is only useful to those within a Judeo-Christian context. In dealing with the criticism that a seemingly immoral act would be obligatory if God commanded it, he proposes that God does not command cruelty for its own sake. Adams does not propose that it would be logically impossible for God to command cruelty, rather that it would be unthinkable for him to do so because of his nature. Adams emphasises the importance of faith in God, specifically faith in God's goodness, as well as his existence.

Adams proposes that an action is morally wrong if and only if it defies the commands of a loving God. If cruelty was commanded, he would not be loving; Adams argued that, in this instance, God's commands would not have to be obeyed and also that his theory of ethical wrongness would break down. He proposed that divine command morality assumes that human concepts of right and wrong are met by God's commands and that the theory can only be applied if this is the case. Adams' theory attempts to counter the challenge that morality might be arbitrary, as moral commands are not based solely on the commands of God, but are founded on his omnibenevolence. It attempts to challenge the claim that an external standard of morality prevents God from being sovereign by making him the source of morality and his character the moral law.

Adams proposes that in many Judeo-Christian contexts, the term 'wrong' is used to mean being contrary to God's commands. In ethical contexts, he believes that 'wrong' entails an emotional attitude against an action and that these two uses of wrongness usually correlate. Adams suggests that a believer's concept of morality is founded in their religious belief and that right and wrong are tied to their belief in God; this works because God always commands what believers accept to be right. If God commanded what a believer perceived as wrong, the believer would not say it is right or wrong to disobey him; rather their concept of morality would break down.

Michael Austin writes that an implication of this modified divine command theory is that God cannot command cruelty for its own sake; this could be argued to be inconsistent with God's omnipotence. Aquinas argued that God's omnipotence should be understood as the ability to do all things that are possible: he attempted to refute the idea that God's inability to perform illogical actions challenges his omnipotence. Austin contends that commanding cruelty for its own sake is not illogical, so is not covered by Aquinas' defence, although Aquinas had argued that sin is the falling short of a perfect action and thus not compatible with omnipotence.

=== Alternative theories ===
Paul Copan argues from a Christian viewpoint that man, made in God's image, conforms to God's sense of morality. The description of actions as right or wrong is therefore relevant to God; a person's sense of what is right or wrong corresponds to God's.

We would not know goodness without God's endowing us with a moral constitution. We have rights, dignity, freedom, and responsibility because God has designed us this way. In this, we reflect God's moral goodness as His image-bearers.

— Paul Copan, Passionate Conviction: Contemporary Discourses on Christian Apologetics

As an alternative to divine command theory, Linda Zagzebski has proposed divine motivation theory, which still fits into a monotheistic framework. According to this theory, goodness is determined by God's motives, rather than by what he commands. Divine motivation theory is similar to virtue ethics because it considers the character of an agent, and whether they are in accordance with God's, as the standard for moral value. Zagzebski argues that things in the world have objective moral properties, such as being lovable, which are given to them through God's perception of them. God's attitude towards something is cast as a morally good attitude. The theory casts God as a good example for morality, and humans should imitate his virtues as much as is possible for finite, imperfect beings.

== Objections ==
=== Semantic objections ===
Philosopher William Wainwright considered a challenge to the theory on semantic grounds, arguing that "being commanded by God" and "being obligatory" do not mean the same thing, contrary to what the theory suggests. He used the example of water not having an identical meaning to H_{2}O to propose that "being commanded by God" does not have an identical meaning to "being obligatory". This was not an objection to the truth of divine command theory, but Wainwright believed it demonstrated that the theory should not be used to formulate assertions about the meaning of obligation. Wainwright also noted that divine command theory might imply that one can only have moral knowledge if one has knowledge of God; Edward Wierenga argued that, if this is the case, the theory seems to deny atheists and agnostics moral knowledge. Hugh Storer Chandler has challenged the theory based on modal ideas of what might exist in different worlds. He suggested that, even if one accepts that being commanded by God and being morally right are the same, they may not be synonyms because they might be different in other possible worlds.

=== Moral motivation ===
Michael Austin has noted that divine command theory could be criticised for prompting people to be moral with impure motivations. He writes of the objection that a moral life should be sought because morality is valued, rather than to avoid punishment or receive a reward. This punishment and reward system of motivation could be seen as inadequate.

=== Euthyphro dilemma ===
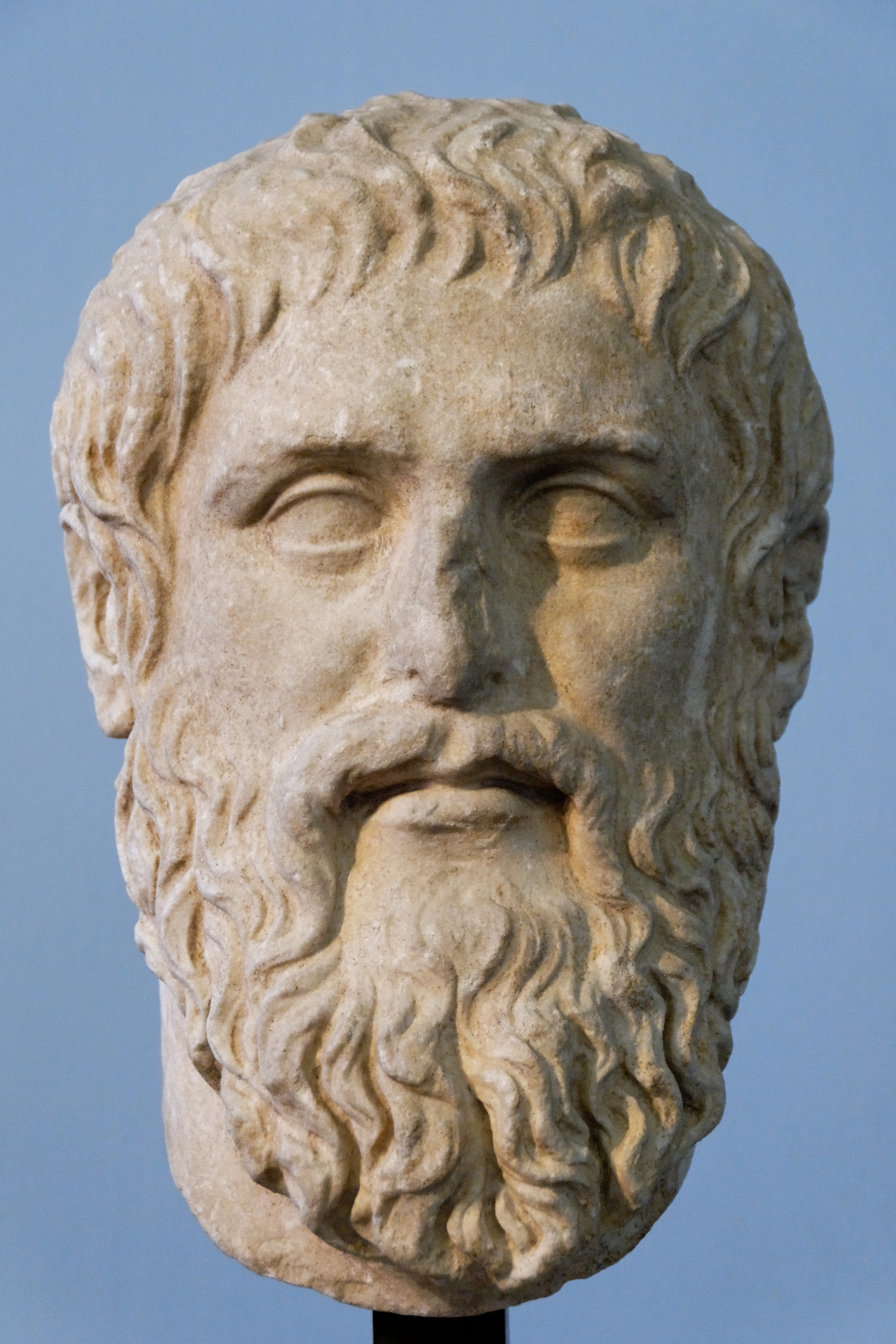
Plato presents the Euthyphro dilemma in one of his dialogues.

The Euthyphro dilemma was proposed in Plato's dialogue between Socrates and Euthyphro. In the scene, Socrates and Euthyphro are discussing the nature of piety when Socrates presents the dilemma, which can be presented as the question "Is X good because God commands it, or does God command X because it is good?".

Is the pious loved by the gods because it is pious, or is it pious because it is loved by the gods?

— Plato, Euthyphro

The Euthyphro dilemma can elicit the response that an action is good because God commands the action, or that God commands an action because it is good. If the first is chosen, it would imply that whatever God commands must be good: even if he commanded someone to inflict suffering, then inflicting suffering must be moral. If the latter is chosen, then morality is no longer dependent on God, defeating the divine command theory. Additionally, if God is subject to an external law, he is not sovereign or omnipotent, which would challenge the orthodox conception of God. Proponents of the Euthyphro dilemma might claim that divine command theory is obviously wrong because either answer challenges the ability of God to give moral laws.

William of Ockham responded to the Euthyphro Dilemma by 'biting the bullet'. He argued that, if God did command people to be cruel, then that would be morally obligatory, proposing that the only limitation to what God can make obligatory is the principle of non-contradiction. Robert Adams defended Ockham's view, noting that it is only a logical possibility that God would command what mankind considers to be immoral, not an actuality. Even if God could logically command these actions, he would not because that is not his character. Eleonore Stump and Norman Kretzmann have responded to the Euthyphro dilemma by appealing to the doctrine of divine simplicity, a concept associated with Aquinas and Aristotle which suggests that the substance and attributes of God are identical. They propose that God and goodness are identical and that this is what makes his commands good.

American philosopher William Alston responded to the Euthyphro dilemma by considering what it means for God to be morally good. If divine command theory is accepted, it implies that God is good because he obeys his own commands; Alston argued that this is not the case and that God's goodness is distinct from abiding by moral obligations. He suggested that a moral obligation implies that there is some possibility that the agent may not honour their obligation; Alston argued that this possibility does not exist for God, so his morality must be distinct from simply obeying his own commands. Alston contended that God is the supreme standard of morality and acts according to his character, which is necessarily good. There is no more arbitrariness in this view than accepting another moral standard.

=== Omnibenevolence ===
Gottfried Wilhelm Leibniz, and some more recent philosophers, challenged the theory of divine command because it seems to entail that God's goodness consists of his following his own commands. It is argued that, if divine command theory is accepted, God's obligations would be what he commanded himself to do; the concept of God commanding himself is seen as incoherent. Neither could God hold any virtues, as a virtue would be the disposition to follow his own commands – if he cannot logically command himself, then he cannot logically have any virtues. Edward Wierenga counters this by claiming that whatever God chooses to do is good, but that his nature means that his actions would always be praiseworthy. William Wainwright argues that, although God does not act because of his commands, it is still logical to say that God has reasons for his actions. He proposes that God is motivated by what is morally good and, when he commands what is morally good, it becomes morally obligatory.

=== Autonomy ===
Michael Austin draws attention to an objection from autonomy, which argues that morality requires an agent to freely choose which principles they live by. This challenges the view of divine command theory that God's will determines what is good because humans are no longer autonomous, but followers of an imposed moral law, making autonomy incompatible with divine command theory. Robert Adams challenges this criticism, arguing that humans must still choose to accept or reject God's commands and rely on their independent judgement about whether or not to follow them.

=== Pluralism ===
Austin considers the view that, in a world of religious pluralism, it is impossible to know which god's or religion's commands should be followed, especially because some religions contradict others, leaving it impossible to accept all of them. Within religions there are also various interpretations of what is commanded. Austin notes that some of the responses to the autonomy objection may be relevant, as an agent must choose whichever religion and morality they judge to be correct. He argues that divine command theory is also consistent with the view that moral truths can be found in all religions and that moral revelation can be found apart from religion. Heimir Geirsson and Margaret Holmgren argue against the view that different religions can lead to the same God because some religions are incompatible with each other (monotheistic and polytheistic religions have contrasting views of divinity, for example, and some Greek or Norse gods magnified human weaknesses). They argue that determining which god should be listened to remains a problem and that, even within a religion, contrasting views of God exist – the commands of God in the Old and New Testaments could seem to contradict each other.

== See also ==
- Deontological ethics
- Divine judgment
- Divine right
- Ethical subjectivism
- Theocracy
- Fideism
- Might makes right
- Euthyphro dilemma
- Argument from authority

== Bibliography ==
- Adams, Robert Merrihew (2002). Finite and Infinite Goods: A Framework for Ethics. Oxford University Press. ISBN 0-19-515371-5.
- Baggett, David; Walls, Jerry (2011). Good God:The Theistic Foundations of Morality. Oxford University Press. ISBN 9780199751808.
- Chandler, Hugh (2007). Platonistic And Disenchanting Theories of Ethics. Peter Lang. ISBN 978-0-8204-8858-5.
- Connolly, Peggy; Keller, David; Leever, Martin; White, Becky Cox (2009). Ethics in Action: A Case-Based Approach. John Wiley & Sons. ISBN 978-1-40517-098-7.
- Cross, Richard (1999). Duns Scotus. ISBN 978-0195125535.
- Evans, C. Stephen (2004). Kierkegaard's Ethic of Love: Divine Commands and Moral Obligations. Oxford University Press. ISBN 0-19-927217-4.
- Geirsson, Heimir; Holmgren, Margaret (2010). Ethical Theory: A Concise Anthology. Broadview Press. ISBN 978-1-55481-015-4.
- Harris, Michael (2003). Divine Command Ethics: Jewish and Christian Perspectives. Psychology Press. ISBN 978-0-415-29769-1.
- Helm, Paul (1981). Divine Commands and Morality. Oxford University Press. ISBN 0-19-875049-8.
- Kowalski, Dean (2011). Moral Theory at the Movies: An Introduction to Ethics. Rowman & Littlefield. ISBN 978-1-44221-455-2.
- Langermann, Tzvi (2011). Monotheism & Ethics: Historical and Contemporary Intersections among Judaism, Christianity and Islam. BRILL. ISBN 9789004194298.
- Martin, Michael (1993). The Case Against Christianity. Temple University Press. ISBN 978-1-56639-081-1.
- Phillips, D. Z.; Tessin, Timothy (2000). Kant and Kierkegaard on Religion. Palgrave Macmillan. ISBN 978-0-31223-234-4.
- Rae, Scott (2009). Moral Choices: An Introduction to Ethics. Zondervan. ISBN 978-0-31032-323-5.
- Shermer, Michael (2005). Why People Believe Weird Things. Henry Hold & Company. ISBN 0-8050-7769-3.
- Morris, Thomas (1988). Divine & Human Action. Cornell University Press. Being and goodness. ISBN 0-8014-9517-2.
- Pojman, Louis; Rea, Michael (2008). Philosophy of Religion: An Anthology. Cengage Learning. ISBN 978-0-495-09504-0.
- Quinn, Philip (2000). The Blackwell Guide to Ethical Theory. Blackwell Publishers. Divine command theory.
- Swinburne, Richard (1977). The Coherence of Theism. Clarendon Press. ISBN 0-19-824410-X.
- Wainwright, William J. (2005). Religion and morality. Ashgate Publishing. ISBN 978-0-7546-1632-0.
- Williams, Thomas (2013). "John Duns Scotus". In Edward N. Zalta (ed.). John Duns Scotus. The Stanford Encyclopedia of Philosophy (Summer 2013 ed.).
- Williams, Thomas, ed. (2002). The Cambridge Companion to Duns Scotus. ISBN 978-0521635639.
