= Stoa Amphiaraion =

Building at the Amphiaraeion of Oropos

Coordinates: 38°17′29.88″N 23°50′45″E

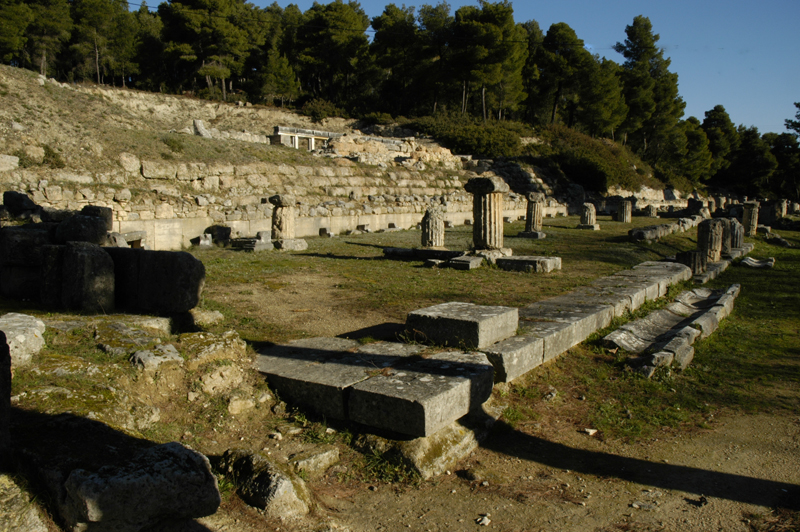
View of the Stoa looking NE.

Stoa Amphiaraion (also known as the Enkoimeterion) is located on the east side of the Sanctuary of Amphiaraios, southeast of the Theatre. It was built c. 360 BC. The two-aisled stoa opens towards the southeast with an outer Doric colonnade of forty-one columns and an inner Ionic colonnade of seventeen columns.

Before its destruction, two small rooms were separated from the rest of the stoa by two columns with a screen between them and a bench running the length of the back wall. Pilgrims would migrate to the stoa and sleep there, awaiting an oracle's advice. The rooms may have served as shelter specifically for female pilgrims. A level area in front of the stoa may have been used as a track. This stoa likely replaced an existing one, located further southwest on the terrace where the later row of dedications stood.
