= Prescriptivism =

Prescriptivism may refer to:

- Linguistic prescriptivism, preference for prescribing rules of language
- Universal prescriptivism, a meta-ethical theory of the meaning of moral statements
