= Euthyphro dilemma =

Ethical problem on the origin of morality posed by Socrates

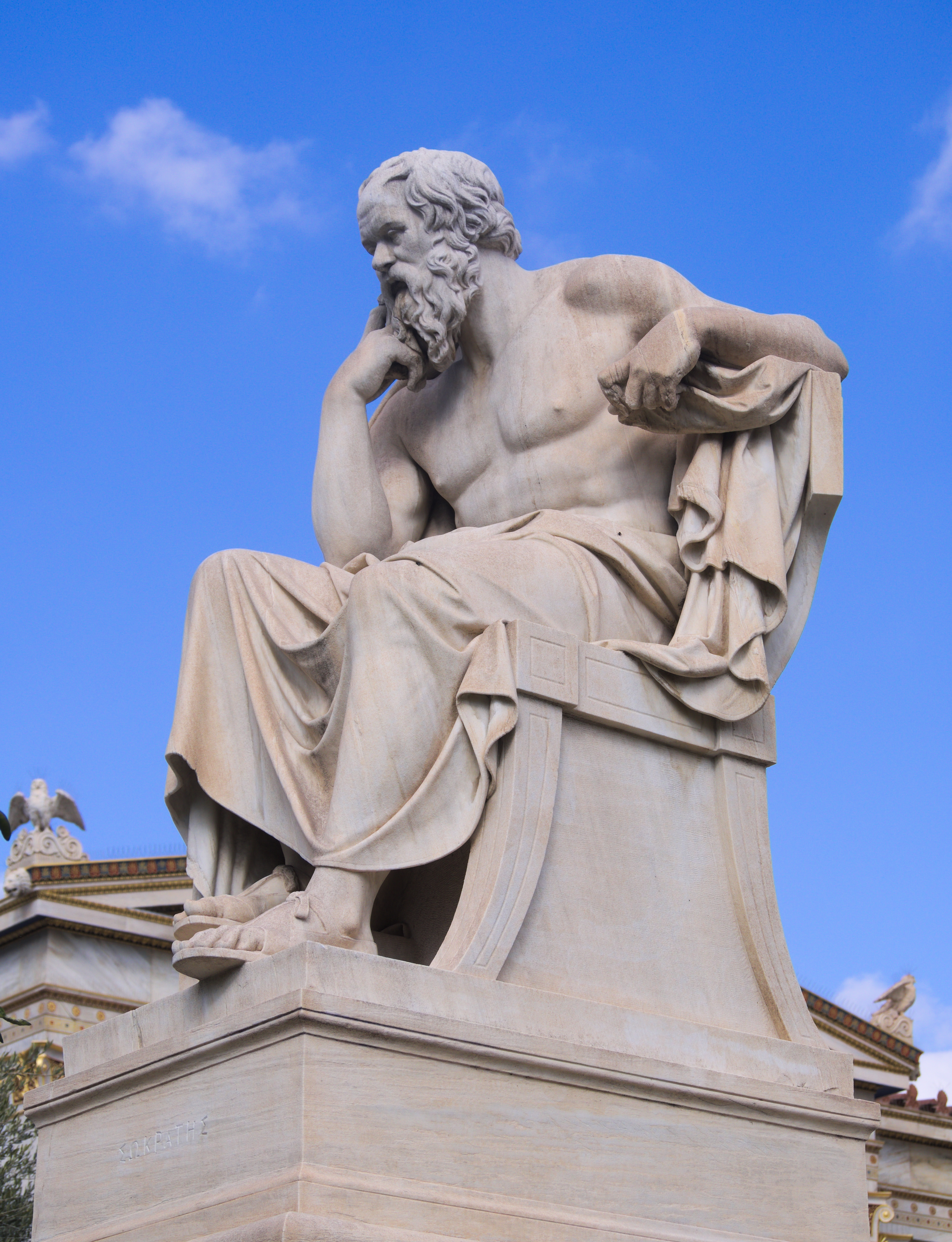
Socrates

The Euthyphro dilemma is found in Plato's dialogue Euthyphro, in which Socrates asks Euthyphro, "Is the pious (τὸ ὅσιον) loved by the gods because it is pious, or is it pious because it is loved by the gods?" (10a)

Although it was originally applied to the ancient Greek pantheon, the dilemma has implications for modern monotheistic religions. Gottfried Leibniz asked whether the good and just "is good and just because God wills it or whether God wills it because it is good and just". Ever since Plato's original discussion, this question has presented a problem for some theists, though others have thought it a false dilemma, and it continues to be an object of theological and philosophical discussion today.

== The dilemma ==
Socrates and Euthyphro discuss the nature of piety in Plato's Euthyphro. Euthyphro proposes (6e) that the pious (τὸ ὅσιον) is the same thing as that which is loved by the gods (τὸ θεοφιλές), but Socrates finds a problem with this proposal: the gods may disagree among themselves (7e). Euthyphro then revises his definition, so that piety is only that which is loved by all of the gods unanimously (9e).

At this point the dilemma surfaces. Socrates asks whether the gods love the pious because it is the pious, or whether the pious is pious only because it is loved by the gods (10a). Socrates and Euthyphro both contemplate the first option: surely the gods love the pious because it is the pious. But this means, Socrates argues, that we are forced to reject the second option: the fact that the gods love something cannot explain why the pious is the pious (10d). Socrates points out that if both options were true, they would yield a vicious circle, with the gods loving the pious because it is the pious, and the pious being the pious because the gods love it. And this, in turn, Socrates argues, means that the pious is not the same as the god-beloved, for what makes the pious the pious is not what makes the god-beloved the god-beloved. After all, what makes the god-beloved the god-beloved is that the gods love it, whereas what makes the pious the pious is something else (9d-11a). Thus Euthyphro's theory does not give us the very nature of the pious, but at most a quality of the pious (11ab).

The dilemma can be modified to apply to philosophical theism, where it is still the object of theological and philosophical discussion, largely within the Christian, Jewish, and Islamic traditions. German philosopher and mathematician Gottfried Leibniz presented this version of the dilemma: "It is generally agreed that whatever God wills is good and just. But there remains the question whether it is good and just because God wills it or whether God wills it because it is good and just; in other words, whether justice and goodness are arbitrary or whether they belong to the necessary and eternal truths about the nature of things." Many philosophers and theologians have addressed the Euthyphro dilemma since the time of Plato, though not always with reference to the Platonic dialogue. According to scholar Terence Irwin, the issue and its connection with Plato was revived by Ralph Cudworth and Samuel Clarke in the 17th and 18th centuries. More recently, it has received a great deal of attention from contemporary philosophers working in metaethics and the philosophy of religion. Philosophers and theologians aiming to defend theism against the threat of the dilemma have developed a variety of responses.

== Response: God commands it because it is right ==
=== Supporters ===
The first horn of the dilemma (i.e. that which is right is commanded by God because it is right) goes by a variety of names, including intellectualism, rationalism, realism, naturalism, and objectivism. Roughly, it is the view that there are independent moral standards: some actions are right or wrong in themselves, independent of God's commands. This is the view accepted by Socrates and Euthyphro in Plato's dialogue. The Mu'tazilah school of Islamic theology also defended the view (with, for example, Nazzam maintaining that God is powerless to engage in injustice or lying), as did the Islamic philosopher Averroes. Thomas Aquinas never explicitly addresses the Euthyphro dilemma, but Aquinas scholars often put him on this side of the issue. Aquinas draws a distinction between what is good or evil in itself and what is good or evil because of God's commands, with unchangeable moral standards forming the bulk of natural law. Thus he contends that not even God can change the Ten Commandments (adding, however, that God can change what individuals deserve in particular cases, in what might look like special dispensations to murder or stealing). Among later Scholastics, Gabriel Vásquez is particularly clear-cut about obligations existing prior to anyone's will, even God's. Modern natural law theory saw Grotius and Leibniz also putting morality prior to God's will, comparing moral truths to unchangeable mathematical truths, and engaging voluntarists like Pufendorf in philosophical controversy. Cambridge Platonists like Benjamin Whichcote and Ralph Cudworth mounted seminal attacks on voluntarist theories, paving the way for the later rationalist metaethics of Samuel Clarke and Richard Price; what emerged was a view on which eternal moral standards, though dependent on God in some way, exist independently of God's will and prior to God's commands. Contemporary philosophers of religion who embrace this horn of the Euthyphro dilemma include Richard Swinburne and T. J. Mawson (though see below for complications).

=== Criticisms ===
- Sovereignty: If there are moral standards independent of God's will, then "[t]here is something over which God is not sovereign. God is bound by the laws of morality instead of being their establisher. Moreover, God depends for his goodness on the extent to which he conforms to an independent moral standard. Thus, God is not absolutely independent." 18th-century philosopher Richard Price, who takes the first horn and thus sees morality as "necessary and immutable", sets out the objection as follows: "It may seem that this is setting up something distinct from God, which is independent of him, and equally eternal and necessary."
- Omnipotence: These moral standards would limit God's power: not even God could oppose them by commanding what is evil and thereby making it good. This point was influential in Islamic theology: "In relation to God, objective values appeared as a limiting factor to His power to do as He wills... Ash'ari got rid of the whole problem by denying the existence of objective values which might act as a standard for God's action." Similar concerns drove the medieval voluntarists Duns Scotus and William of Ockham. As modern philosopher Richard Swinburne puts the point, this horn "seems to place a restriction on God's power if he cannot make any action which he chooses obligatory... [and also] it seems to limit what God can command us to do. God, if he is to be God, cannot command us to do what, independently of his will, is wrong."
- Freedom of the will: Moreover, these moral standards would limit God's freedom of will: God could not command anything opposed to them, and perhaps would have no choice but to command in accordance with them. As Mark Murphy puts the point, "if moral requirements existed prior to God's willing them, requirements that an impeccable God could not violate, God's liberty would be compromised."
- Morality without God: If there are moral standards independent of God, then morality would retain its authority even if God did not exist. This conclusion was explicitly (and notoriously) drawn by early modern political theorist Hugo Grotius: "What we have been saying [about the natural law] would have a degree of validity even if we should concede that which cannot be conceded without the utmost wickedness, that there is no God, or that the affairs of men are of no concern to him" On such a view, God is no longer a "law-giver" but at most a "law-transmitter" who plays no vital role in the foundations of morality. Nontheists have capitalized on this point, largely as a way of disarming moral arguments for God's existence: if morality does not depend on God in the first place, such arguments stumble at the starting gate.

=== Responses to criticisms ===
Contemporary philosophers Joshua Hoffman and Gary S. Rosenkrantz take the first horn of the dilemma, branding divine command theory a "subjective theory of value" that makes morality arbitrary. They accept a theory of morality on which, "right and wrong, good and bad, are in a sense independent of what anyone believes, wants, or prefers." They do not address the problems mentioned above with the first horn, but do consider a related problem concerning God's omnipotence: namely, that it might be handicapped by his inability to bring about what is independently evil. To this they reply that God is omnipotent, even though there are states of affairs he cannot bring about: omnipotence is a matter of "maximal power", not an ability to bring about all possible states of affairs. And supposing that it is impossible for God not to exist, then since there cannot be more than one omnipotent being, it is therefore impossible for any being to have more power than God (e.g., a being who is omnipotent but not omnibenevolent). Thus God's omnipotence remains intact.

Richard Swinburne and T. J. Mawson have a slightly more complicated view. They both take the first horn of the dilemma when it comes to necessary moral truths. But divine commands are not totally irrelevant, for God and his will can still effect contingent moral truths. On the one hand, the most fundamental moral truths hold true regardless of whether God exists or what God has commanded: "Genocide and torturing children are wrong and would remain so whatever commands any person issued." This is because, according to Swinburne, such truths are true as a matter of logical necessity: like the laws of logic, one cannot deny them without contradiction. This parallel offers a response to the aforementioned problems of God's sovereignty, omnipotence, and freedom: namely, that these necessary truths of morality pose no more of a threat than the laws of logic. On the other hand, there is still an important role for God's will. First, there are some divine commands that can directly create moral obligations: e.g., the command to worship on Sundays instead of on Tuesdays. Notably, not even these commands, for which Swinburne and Mawson take the second horn of the dilemma, have ultimate, underived authority. Rather, they create obligations only because of God's role as creator and sustainer and indeed owner of the universe, together with the necessary moral truth that we owe some limited consideration to benefactors and owners. Second, God can make an indirect moral difference by deciding what sort of universe to create. For example, whether a public policy is morally good might indirectly depend on God's creative acts: the policy's goodness or badness might depend on its effects, and those effects would in turn depend on the sort of universe God has decided to create.

== Response: It is right because God commands it ==
=== Supporters ===
The second horn of the dilemma (i.e. that which is right is right because it is commanded by God) is sometimes known as divine command theory or voluntarism. Roughly, it is the view that there are no moral standards other than God's will: without God's commands, nothing would be right or wrong. This view was partially defended by Duns Scotus, who argued that not all Ten Commandments belong to the Natural Law in the strictest sense. Scotus held that while our duties to God (the first three commandments, traditionally thought of as the First Tablet) are self-evident, true by definition, and unchangeable even by God, our duties to others (found on the second tablet) were arbitrarily willed by God and are within his power to revoke and replace (although, the third commandment, to honour the Sabbath and keep it holy, has a little of both, as we are absolutely obliged to render worship to God, but there is no obligation in natural law to do it on this day or that). Scotus does note, however that the last seven commandments "are highly consonant with [the natural law], though they do not follow necessarily from first practical principles that are known in virtue of their terms and are necessarily known by any intellect [that understands their terms]. And it is certain that all the precepts of the second table belong to the natural law in this second way, since their rectitude is highly consonant with first practical principles that are known necessarily". Scotus justifies this position with the example of a peaceful society, noting that the possession of private property is not necessary to have a peaceful society, but that "those of weak character" would be more easily made peaceful with private property than without.

William of Ockham went further, contending that (since there is no contradiction in it) God could command us not to love God and even to hate God. Later Scholastics like Pierre D'Ailly and his student Jean de Gerson explicitly confronted the Euthyphro dilemma, taking the voluntarist position that God does not "command good actions because they are good or prohibit evil ones because they are evil; but... these are therefore good because they are commanded and evil because prohibited." Protestant reformers Martin Luther and John Calvin both stressed the absolute sovereignty of God's will, with Luther writing that "for [God's] will there is no cause or reason that can be laid down as a rule or measure for it", and Calvin writing that "everything which [God] wills must be held to be righteous by the mere fact of his willing it." The voluntarist emphasis on God's absolute power was carried further by Descartes, who notoriously held that God had freely created the eternal truths of logic and mathematics, and that God was therefore capable of giving circles unequal radii, giving triangles other than 180 internal degrees, and even making contradictions true. Descartes explicitly seconded Ockham: "why should [God] not have been able to give this command [i.e., the command to hate God] to one of his creatures?" Thomas Hobbes notoriously reduced the justice of God to "irresistible power" (drawing the complaint of Bishop Bramhall that this "overturns... all law"). And William Paley held that all moral obligations bottom out in the self-interested "urge" to avoid Hell and enter Heaven by acting in accord with God's commands. Islam's Ash'arite theologians, al-Ghazali foremost among them, embraced voluntarism: scholar George Hourani writes that the view "was probably more prominent and widespread in Islam than in any other civilization." Wittgenstein said that of "the two interpretations of the Essence of the Good", that which holds that "the Good is good, in virtue of the fact that God wills it" is "the deeper", while that which holds that "God wills the good, because it is good" is "the shallow, rationalistic one, in that it behaves 'as though' that which is good could be given some further foundation". Today, divine command theory is defended by many philosophers of religion, though typically in a restricted form (see below).

=== Criticisms ===
This horn of the dilemma also faces several problems:

- No reasons for morality: If there is no moral standard other than God's will, then God's commands are arbitrary (i.e., based on pure whimsy or caprice). This would mean that morality is ultimately not based on reasons: "if theological voluntarism is true, then God's commands/intentions must be arbitrary; [but] it cannot be that morality could wholly depend on something arbitrary... [for] when we say that some moral state of affairs obtains, we take it that there is a reason for that moral state of affairs obtaining rather than another." And as Michael J. Murray and Michael Rea put it, this would also "cas[t] doubt on the notion that morality is genuinely objective." An additional problem is that it is difficult to explain how true moral actions can exist if one acts only out of fear of God or in an attempt to be rewarded by him.
- No reasons for God: This arbitrariness would also jeopardize God's status as a wise and rational being, one who always acts on good reasons. As Leibniz writes: "Where will be his justice and his wisdom if he has only a certain despotic power, if arbitrary will takes the place of reasonableness, and if in accord with the definition of tyrants, justice consists in that which is pleasing to the most powerful? Besides it seems that every act of willing supposes some reason for the willing and this reason, of course, must precede the act."
- Anything goes: This arbitrariness would also mean that anything could become good, and anything could become bad, merely upon God's command. Thus if God commanded us "to gratuitously inflict pain on each other" or to engage in "cruelty for its own sake" or to hold an "annual sacrifice of randomly selected ten-year-olds in a particularly gruesome ritual that involves excruciating and prolonged suffering for its victims", then we would be morally obligated to do so. As 17th-century philosopher Ralph Cudworth put it: "nothing can be imagined so grossly wicked, or so foully unjust or dishonest, but if it were supposed to be commanded by this omnipotent Deity, must needs upon that hypothesis forthwith become holy, just, and righteous."
- Moral contingency: If morality depends on the perfectly free will of God, morality would lose its necessity: "If nothing prevents God from loving things that are different from what God actually loves, then goodness can change from world to world or time to time. This is obviously objectionable to those who believe that claims about morality are, if true, necessarily true." In other words, no action is necessarily moral: any right action could have easily been wrong, if God had so decided, and an action which is right today could easily become wrong tomorrow, if God so decides. Indeed, some have argued that divine command theory is incompatible with ordinary conceptions of moral supervenience.
- Why do God's commands obligate?: Mere commands do not create obligations unless the commander has some commanding authority. But this commanding authority cannot itself be based on those very commands (i.e., a command to obey commands), otherwise a vicious circle results. So, in order for God's commands to obligate us, he must derive commanding authority from some source other than his own will. As Cudworth put it: "For it was never heard of, that any one founded all his authority of commanding others, and others [sic] obligation or duty to obey his commands, in a law of his own making, that men should be required, obliged, or bound to obey him. Wherefore since the thing willed in all laws is not that men should be bound or obliged to obey; this thing cannot be the product of the meer [sic] will of the commander, but it must proceed from something else; namely, the right or authority of the commander." To avoid the circle, one might say our obligation comes from gratitude to God for creating us. But this presupposes some sort of independent moral standard obligating us to be grateful to our benefactors. As 18th-century philosopher Francis Hutcheson writes: "Is the Reason exciting to concur with the Deity this, 'The Deity is our Benefactor?' Then what Reason excites to concur with Benefactors?" Or finally, one might resort to Hobbes's view: "The right of nature whereby God reigneth over men, and punisheth those that break his laws, is to be derived, not from his creating them (as if he required obedience, as of gratitude for his benefits), but from his irresistible power." In other words, might makes right.
- God's goodness: If all goodness is a matter of God's will, then what shall become of God's goodness? Thus William P. Alston writes, "since the standards of moral goodness are set by divine commands, to say that God is morally good is just to say that he obeys his own commands... that God practises what he preaches, whatever that might be;" Hutcheson deems such a view "an insignificant tautology, amounting to no more than this, 'That God wills what he wills.'" Alternatively, as Leibniz puts it, divine command theorists "deprive God of the designation good: for what cause could one have to praise him for what he does, if in doing something quite different he would have done equally well?" A related point is raised by C. S. Lewis: "if good is to be defined as what God commands, then the goodness of God Himself is emptied of meaning and the commands of an omnipotent fiend would have the same claim on us as those of the 'righteous Lord.'" Or again Leibniz: "this opinion would hardly distinguish God from the devil." That is, since divine command theory trivializes God's goodness, it is incapable of explaining the difference between God and an all-powerful demon.
- The is-ought problem and the naturalistic fallacy: According to David Hume, it is hard to see how moral propositions featuring the relation ought could ever be deduced from ordinary is propositions, such as "the being of a God." Divine command theory is thus guilty of deducing moral oughts from ordinary ises about God's commands. In a similar vein, G. E. Moore argued (with his open question argument) that the notion good is indefinable, and any attempts to analyze it in naturalistic or metaphysical terms are guilty of the so-called "naturalistic fallacy." This would block any theory which analyzes morality in terms of God's will: and indeed, in a later discussion of divine command theory, Moore concluded that "when we assert any action to be right or wrong, we are not merely making an assertion about the attitude of mind towards it of any being or set of beings whatever."
- No morality without God: If all morality is a matter of God's will, then if God does not exist, there is no morality. This is the thought captured in the slogan (often attributed to Dostoevsky) "If God does not exist, everything is permitted." Divine command theorists disagree over whether this is a problem for their view or a virtue of their view. Many argue that morality does indeed require God's existence, and that this is in fact a problem for atheism. But divine command theorist Robert Merrihew Adams contends that this idea ("that no actions would be ethically wrong if there were not a loving God") is one that "will seem (at least initially) implausible to many", and that his theory must "dispel [an] air of paradox."

== Response: Restricted divine command theory ==
One common response to the Euthyphro dilemma centers on a distinction between value and obligation. Obligation, which concerns rightness and wrongness (or what is required, forbidden, or permissible), is given a voluntarist treatment. But value, which concerns goodness and badness, is treated as independent of divine commands. The result is a restricted divine command theory that applies only to a specific region of morality: the deontic region of obligation. This response is found in Francisco Suárez's discussion of natural law and voluntarism in De legibus and has been prominent in contemporary philosophy of religion, appearing in the work of Robert M. Adams, Philip L. Quinn, and William P. Alston.

A significant attraction of such a view is that, since it allows for a non-voluntarist treatment of goodness and badness, and therefore of God's own moral attributes, some of the aforementioned problems with voluntarism can perhaps be answered. God's commands are not arbitrary: there are reasons which guide his commands based ultimately on this goodness and badness. God could not issue horrible commands: God's own essential goodness or loving character would keep him from issuing any unsuitable commands. Our obligation to obey God's commands does not result in circular reasoning; it might instead be based on a gratitude whose appropriateness is itself independent of divine commands. These proposed responses are controversial, and some steer the view back into problems associated with the first horn.

One problem remains for such views: if God's own essential goodness does not depend on divine commands, then the question regards what it does depend on. Perhaps something other than God. Here the restricted divine command theory is commonly combined with a view reminiscent of Plato: God is identical to the ultimate standard for goodness. Alston offers the analogy of the standard meter bar in France. Something is a meter long inasmuch as it is the same length as the standard meter bar, and likewise, something is good inasmuch as it approximates God. If one asks why God is identified as the ultimate standard for goodness, Alston replies that this is "the end of the line," with no further explanation available, but adds that this is no more arbitrary than a view that invokes a fundamental moral standard. On this view, then, even though goodness is independent of God's will, it still depends on God, and thus God's sovereignty remains intact.

This response has been criticized by Wes Morriston. If we identify the ultimate standard for goodness with God's nature, then it seems we are identifying it with certain properties of God (e.g., being loving, being just). If so, then the dilemma resurfaces: God is either good because he has those properties, or those properties are good because God has them. Nevertheless, Morriston concludes that the appeal to God's essential goodness is the divine-command theorist's best bet. To produce a satisfying result, however, it would have to give an account of God's goodness that does not trivialize it and does not make God subject to an independent standard of goodness.

Moral philosopher Peter Singer, disputing the perspective that "God is good" and could never advocate something like torture, states that those who propose this are "caught in a trap of their own making, for what can they possibly mean by the assertion that God is good? That God is approved of by God?"

== Response: False dilemma ==
Augustine, Anselm, and Aquinas all wrote about the problems raised by the Euthyphro dilemma, although, like William James and Wittgenstein later, they did not mention it by name. As philosopher and Anselm scholar Katherin A. Rogers observes, many contemporary philosophers of religion suppose that there are true propositions which exist as platonic abstracta independently of God. Among these are propositions constituting a moral order, to which God must conform in order to be good. Classical Judaeo-Christian theism, however, rejects such a view as inconsistent with God's omnipotence, which requires that God and what he has made is all that there is. "The classical tradition," Rogers notes, "also steers clear of the other horn of the Euthyphro dilemma, divine command theory." From a classical theistic perspective, therefore, the Euthyphro dilemma is false. As Rogers puts it, "Anselm, like Augustine before him and Aquinas later, rejects both horns of the Euthyphro dilemma. God neither conforms to nor invents the moral order. Rather His very nature is the standard for value." Another criticism raised by Peter Geach is that the dilemma implies you must search for a definition that fits piety rather than work backwards by deciding pious acts (i.e. you must know what piety is before you can list acts which are pious). It also implies something can not be pious if it is only intended to serve the Gods without actually fulfilling any useful purpose. Pronomian theologian Gregory Scott McKenzie postulates that the Euthyphro dilemma can only be considered a false dilemma if the Christian speaker believes in the eternal continuity of the Torah.

=== Jewish thought ===
The basis of the false dilemma response—God's nature is the standard for value—predates the dilemma itself, appearing first in the thought of the eighth-century BC Hebrew prophets, Amos, Hosea, Micah and Isaiah. (Amos lived some three centuries before Socrates and two before Thales, traditionally regarded as the first Greek philosopher.) "Their message," writes British scholar Norman H. Snaith, "is recognized by all as marking a considerable advance on all previous ideas," not least in its "special consideration for the poor and down-trodden." As Snaith observes, tsedeq, the Hebrew word for righteousness, "actually stands for the establishment of God's will in the land." This includes justice, but goes beyond it, "because God's will is wider than justice. He has a particular regard for the helpless ones on earth." Tsedeq "is the norm by which all must be judged" and it "depends entirely upon the Nature of God."

Hebrew has few abstract nouns. What the Greeks thought of as ideas or abstractions, the Hebrews thought of as activities. In contrast to the Greek dikaiosune (justice) of the philosophers, tsedeq is not an idea abstracted from this world of affairs. As Snaith writes:

Tsedeq is something that happens here, and can be seen, and recognized, and known. It follows, therefore, that when the Hebrew thought of tsedeq (righteousness), he did not think of Righteousness in general, or of Righteousness as an Idea. On the contrary, he thought of a particular righteous act, an action, concrete, capable of exact description, fixed in time and space.... If the word had anything like a general meaning for him, then it was as it was represented by a whole series of events, the sum-total of a number of particular happenings.

The Hebrew stance on what came to be called the problem of universals, as on much else, was very different from that of Plato and precluded anything like the Euthyphro dilemma. This has not changed. In 2005, Jonathan Sacks wrote, "In Judaism, the Euthyphro dilemma does not exist." Jewish philosophers Avi Sagi and Daniel Statman criticized the Euthyphro dilemma as "misleading" because "it is not exhaustive": it leaves out a third option, namely that God "acts only out of His nature."

=== Thomas Aquinas ===
In Aquinas' view, to speak of abstractions not only as existent, but as more perfect exemplars than fully designated particulars, is to put a premium on generality and vagueness. On this analysis, the abstract "good" in the first horn of the Euthyphro dilemma is an unnecessary obfuscation. Aquinas frequently quoted with approval Aristotle's definition, "Good is what all desire." As he clarified, "When we say that good is what all desire, it is not to be understood that every kind of good thing is desired by all, but that whatever is desired has the nature of good." In other words, even those who desire evil desire it "only under the aspect of good," i.e., of what is desirable. The difference between desiring good and desiring evil is that in the former, will and reason are in harmony, whereas in the latter, they are in discord.

Aquinas's discussion of sin provides a good point of entry to his philosophical explanation of why the nature of God is the standard for value. "Every sin," he writes, "consists in the longing for a passing [i.e., ultimately unreal or false] good." Thus, "in a certain sense it is true what Socrates says, namely that no one sins with full knowledge." "No sin in the will happens without an ignorance of the understanding." God, however, has full knowledge (omniscience) and therefore by definition (that of Socrates, Plato, and Aristotle as well as Aquinas) can never will anything other than what is good. It has been claimed – for instance, by Nicolai Hartmann, who wrote: "There is no freedom for the good that would not be at the same time freedom for evil" – that this would limit God's freedom, and therefore his omnipotence. Josef Pieper, however, replies that such arguments rest upon an impermissibly anthropomorphic conception of God. In the case of humans, as Aquinas says, to be able to sin is indeed a consequence, or even a sign, of freedom (quodam libertatis signum). Humans, in other words, are not puppets manipulated by God so that they always do what is right. However, "it does not belong to the essence of the free will to be able to decide for evil." "To will evil is neither freedom nor a part of freedom." It is precisely humans' creatureliness – that is, their not being God and therefore omniscient – that makes them capable of sinning. Consequently, writes Pieper, "the inability to sin should be looked on as the very signature of a higher freedom – contrary to the usual way of conceiving the issue." Pieper concludes: "Only the will [i.e., God's] can be the right standard of its own willing and must will what is right necessarily, from within itself, and always. A deviation from the norm would not even be thinkable. And obviously only the absolute divine will is the right standard of its own act" – and consequently of all human acts. Thus the second horn of the Euthyphro dilemma, divine command theory, is also disposed of.

Thomist philosopher Edward Feser writes, "Divine simplicity [entails] that God's will just is God's goodness which just is His immutable and necessary existence. That means that what is objectively good and what God wills for us as morally obligatory are really the same thing considered under different descriptions, and that neither could have been other than they are. There can be no question then, either of God's having arbitrarily commanded something different for us (torturing babies for fun, or whatever) or of there being a standard of goodness apart from Him. Again, the Euthyphro dilemma is a false one; the third option that it fails to consider is that what is morally obligatory is what God commands in accordance with a non-arbitrary and unchanging standard of goodness that is not independent of Him... He is not under the moral law precisely because He is the moral law."

=== William James ===
William James, in his essay "The Moral Philosopher and the Moral Life", dismisses the first horn of the Euthyphro dilemma and stays clear of the second. He writes: "Our ordinary attitude of regarding ourselves as subject to an overarching system of moral relations, true 'in themselves,' is ... either an out-and-out superstition, or else it must be treated as a merely provisional abstraction from that real Thinker ... to whom the existence of the universe is due." Moral obligations are created by "personal demands," whether these demands come from the weakest creatures, from the most insignificant persons, or from God. It follows that "ethics have as genuine a foothold in a universe where the highest consciousness is human, as in a universe where there is a God as well." However, whether "the purely human system" works "as well as the other is a different question."

For James, the deepest practical difference in the moral life is between what he calls "the easy-going and the strenuous mood." In a purely human moral system, it is hard to rise above the easy-going mood, since the thinker's "various ideals, known to him to be mere preferences of his own, are too nearly of the same denominational value; he can play fast and loose with them at will. This too is why, in a merely human world without a God, the appeal to our moral energy falls short of its maximum stimulating power." Our attitude is "entirely different" in a world where there are none but "finite demanders" from that in a world where there is also "an infinite demander." This is because "the stable and systematic moral universe for which the ethical philosopher asks is fully possible only in a world where there is a divine thinker with all-enveloping demands", for in that case, "actualized in his thought already must be that ethical philosophy which we seek as the pattern which our own must evermore approach." Even though "exactly what the thought of this infinite thinker may be is hidden from us", our postulation of him serves "to let loose in us the strenuous mood" and confront us with an existential "challenge" in which "our total character and personal genius ... are on trial; and if we invoke any so-called philosophy, our choice and use of that also are but revelations of our personal aptitude or incapacity for moral life. From this unsparing practical ordeal no professor's lectures and no array of books can save us." In the words of Richard M. Gale, "God inspires us to lead the morally strenuous life in virtue of our conceiving of him as unsurpassably good. This supplies James with an adequate answer to the underlying question of the Euthyphro."

== Other formulations ==
=== In philosophical atheism ===
Alexander Rosenberg uses a version of the Euthyphro dilemma to argue that objective morality cannot exist and hence an acceptance of moral nihilism is warranted. He asks, is objective morality correct because evolution discovered it or did evolution discover objective morality because it is correct? If the first horn of the dilemma is true then our current morality cannot be objectively correct by accident because if evolution had given us another type of morality then that would have been objectively correct. If the second horn of dilemma is true then one must account for how the random process of evolution managed to only select for objectively correct moral traits while ignoring the wrong moral traits. Given the knowledge that evolution has given us tendencies to be xenophobic and sexist it is mistaken to claim that evolution has only selected for objective morality as evidently it did not. Because both horns of the dilemma do not give an adequate account for how the evolutionary process instantiated objective morality in humans, a position of Moral nihilism is warranted.

=== In American legal thinking ===
Yale Law School Professor Myres S. McDougal, formerly a classicist, later a scholar of property law, posed the question, "Do we protect it because it's a property right, or is it a property right because we protect it?" The dilemma has also been restated in legal terms by Geoffrey Hodgson, who asked: "Does a state make a law because it is a customary rule, or does law become a customary rule because it is approved by the state?"

== See also ==
- Appeal to authority – Logical fallacy
- Deontology – Class of ethical theories
- Divine simplicity – View of God without parts or features
- Ethical dilemma – Type of dilemma in philosophy
- Ethics in the Bible
