= Prescriptivity =

Prescriptivity is a term used in meta-ethics to state that when an evaluative judgment or decision is made it must either prescribe or condemn. The word implies that these judgments (and the prescription and condemnation) logically commit us to certain ways of living. Contrary to popular opinion, prescriptivity does not just describe or categorize decisions - for example, "you ought to do this" (used evaluatively) logically entails the imperative "do this."

== Universal Prescriptivism ==
Prescriptivity is one of the five (prescriptivity, universalizability, overridingness, publicity, and practicability) axioms of Formal Ethics. When combined with Universalizability, prescriptivity becomes Universal prescriptivism. Universal prescriptivism combines these two methods of thinking, combining evaluative judgments (which commit us to making similar judgments about similar cases) and prescription and condemnation when the judgment is at last made. This enables us to think in a very powerful and rational way about ethical and moral issues.

== See also ==
- R. M. Hare
