= R. M. Hare =

British moral philosopher (1919–2002)

R. M. Hare FBA
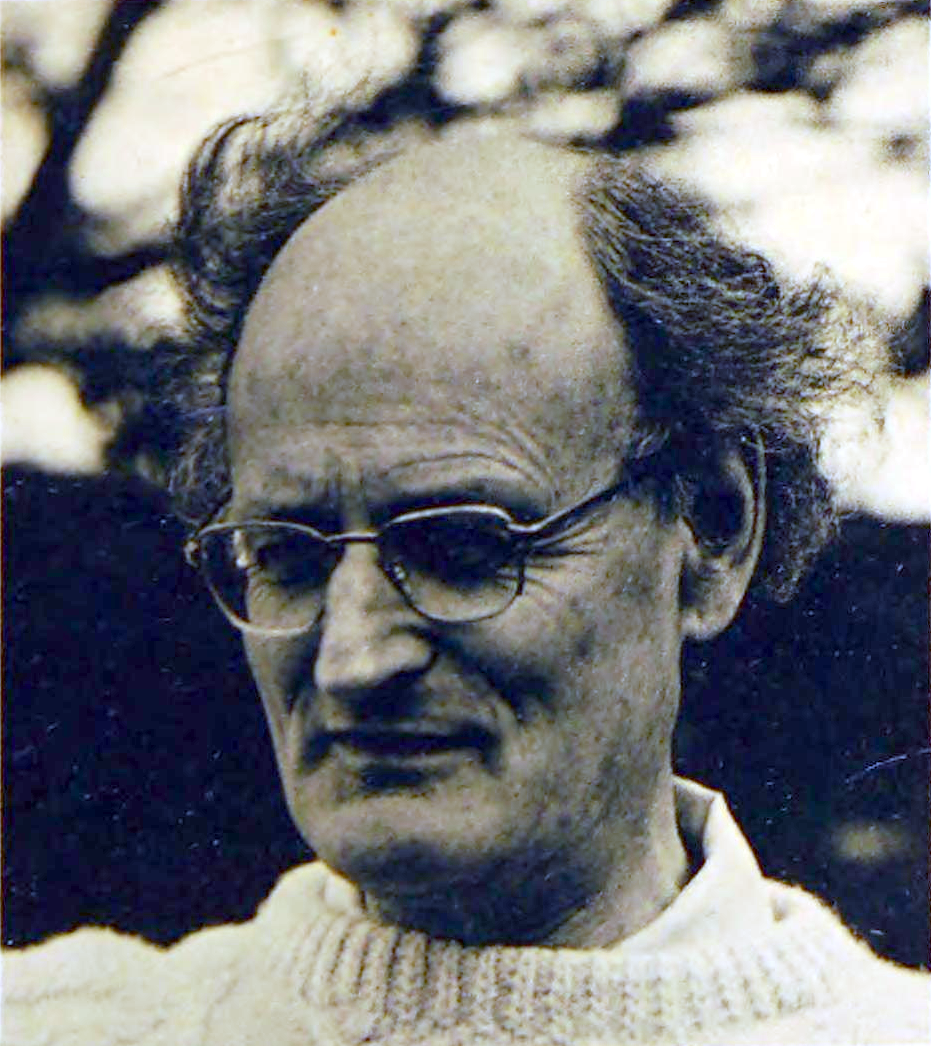
- Hare, c. 1988
- Born: Richard Mervyn Hare; 21 March 1919; Backwell, England
- Died: 29 January 2002 (aged 82); Ewelme, England
- Spouse: Catherine Verney (m. 1947)
- Children: 4, including John E. Hare

Education
- Education: Balliol College, Oxford
- Academic advisor: H. J. Paton

Philosophical work
- Era: Contemporary philosophy
- Region: Western philosophy
- School: Analytic philosophy
- Institutions: Balliol College, Oxford; Corpus Christi College, Oxford; University of Florida
- Notable students: John Lucas; Brian McGuinness; Peter Singer; Bernard Williams
- Main interests: Moral philosophy; political philosophy
- Notable ideas: Moral particularism; preference utilitarianism; two-level utilitarianism; universal prescriptivism

Richard Mervyn Hare (Note: Pronounced /hɛər/.) (21 March 1919 – 29 January 2002) was a British moral philosopher who held the post of White's Professor of Moral Philosophy at the University of Oxford from 1966 until 1983. He subsequently taught for a number of years at the University of Florida. His meta-ethical theories were influential during the second half of the twentieth century.

Hare is best known for his development of prescriptivism as a meta-ethical theory, which he argues is supported by analysis of formal features of moral discourse, and for his defence of preference utilitarianism based on his prescriptivism.

Some of Hare's tutorial students, such as Brian McGuinness, John Lucas, and Bernard Williams, went on to become well-known philosophers. Hare's son, John E. Hare, also became a philosopher. Peter Singer, known for his involvement with the animal liberation movement (who studied Hare's work as an honours student at the University of Melbourne and came to know Hare personally while he was an Oxford BPhil graduate student), has explicitly adopted some elements of Hare's thought, though not his doctrine of universal prescriptivism.

== Life and career ==
Richard Hare was born on 21 March 1919 in Backwell, Somerset. He attended Rugby School in Warwickshire, followed in 1937 by Balliol College, Oxford, where he read greats (classics). Having joined the officer training corps whist still at Rugby, on the outbreak of World War II, he volunteered to serve with the Royal Artillery.

Hare was taken as a prisoner of war by the Japanese from the fall of Singapore in 1942 to the end of the Second World War, an experience he equated with slavery. Hare's wartime experience had a lasting impact on his philosophical views, particularly his view that moral philosophy has an obligation to help people live their lives as moral beings. His earliest work in philosophy, which has never been published, dates from this period, and in it, he tried to develop a system that might "serve as a guide to life in the harshest conditions", according to C. C. W. Taylor.

He returned to Oxford after the war, and in 1947, married Catherine Verney, a marriage that produced a son and three daughters. (Hare's son, John E. Hare, is also a philosopher.) He was elected fellow and tutor in philosophy at Balliol from 1947 to 1966; honorary fellow at Balliol from 1974 to 2002; and was appointed Wilde Lecturer in Natural Religion, 1963–66; and White's Professor of Moral Philosophy, 1966–1983, which accompanied a move to Corpus Christi. He was president of the Aristotelian Society from 1972 to 1973. He left Oxford in 1983 to become Graduate Research Professor of Philosophy at the University of Florida at Gainesville, a post he held until 1994. In 1978 he was interviewed for Bryan Magee's Men of Ideas television show, where he spoke about moral philosophy.

After suffering a series of strokes, Hare died in Ewelme, Oxfordshire, on 29 January 2002.

At his memorial service held at St Mary's Church, Oxford, in May of that year, Peter Singer delivered (as he felt Hare would have wished) a lecture on Hare's "Achievements in Moral Philosophy" which concluded by giving three "major, lasting" ones, namely, "restoring reason to moral argument, distinguishing intuitive and critical levels of moral thinking, and pioneering the development of ... applied ethics".

== Influences ==
Hare was greatly influenced by the emotivism of A. J. Ayer and Charles L. Stevenson, the ordinary language philosophy of J. L. Austin, a certain reading of the later philosophy of Ludwig Wittgenstein, utilitarianism, and Immanuel Kant.

Hare took a view on religion in line with R. B. Braithwaite's An Empiricist's View of the Nature of Religious Belief, which he cited as "the best thing on this subject [he] had ever heard or read".

Hare held that ethical rules should not be based on a principle of utility, though he took into account utilitarian considerations. His hybrid approach to meta-ethics distinguishes him from classical utilitarians like Jeremy Bentham. His book Sorting Out Ethics might be interpreted as saying that Hare is as much a Kantian as he is a utilitarian, but other sources disagree with this assessment. Although Hare used many concepts from Kant, especially the idea of universalisability, he was still a consequentialist, rather than a deontologist, in his normative ethical views. Hare himself addressed the possibility that Kant was a utilitarian like himself, in his "Could Kant Have Been a Utilitarian?"

== Universal prescriptivism ==
In a series of books, especially The Language of Morals (1952), Freedom and Reason (1963), and Moral Thinking (1981), Hare gave shape to a theory that he called universal prescriptivism. According to this, moral terms such as 'good', 'ought' and 'right' have two logical or semantic properties: universalisability and prescriptivity. By the former, he meant that moral judgments must identify the situation they describe according to a finite set of universal terms, excluding proper names, but not definite descriptions. By the latter, he meant that moral agents must perform those acts they consider themselves to have an obligation to perform whenever they are physically and psychologically able to do so. In other words, he argued that it made no sense for someone to say, sincerely: "I ought to do X", and then fail to do X. This was identified by Frankena, Nobis and others as a major flaw in Hare's system, as it appeared to take no account of akrasia, or weakness of the will.

Hare argued that the combination of universalizability and prescriptivity leads to a certain form of consequentialism, namely, preference utilitarianism. In brief, this means that we should act in such a way as to maximise the satisfaction of people's preferences.

== Importance of specificity ==
Hare departs from Kant's view that only the most general maxims of conduct be used (for example, "do not steal"), but the consequences ignored, when applying the categorical imperative. To ignore consequences leads to absurdity: for example, that it would be wrong to steal a terrorist's plans to blow up a nuclear facility. All the specific facts of a circumstance must be considered, and these include probable consequences. They also include the relevant, universal properties of the facts: for example, the psychological states of those involved.

== Applied ethics and political philosophy ==
While Hare was primarily interested in meta-ethics, he also made some important contributions to the fields of political philosophy and applied ethics. Among his essays within these fields those on the morality of slavery, abortion and the Golden Rule, and on demi-vegetarianism have received the most attention. Hare's most important work in political philosophy and applied ethics is collected in the two volumes Essays on Political Morality (1989) and Essays on Bioethics (1993), both published by Oxford University Press.

== Works ==
- Hare, R. M. (1952). The Language of Morals. Oxford: Clarendon Press. OCLC 1034413.
- Hare, R. M. (1964) [1963]. Freedom and Reason. Oxford: Clarendon Press. ISBN 9780198810926.
- Hare, R. M. (1971). Practical Inferences. London: Macmillan Education UK. doi:10.1007/978-1-349-01209-1. ISBN 978-1-349-01211-4.
- Hare, R. M. (1971). Essays on Philosophical Method. Berkeley and Los Angeles: University of California Press. ISBN 9780520323346.
- Hare, R. M. (1972). Applications of Moral Philosophy. London: Macmillan Education UK. doi:10.1007/978-1-349-00955-8. ISBN 978-1-349-00957-2.
- Hare, R. M. (1972). Essays on the Moral Concepts. London: Macmillan Education UK. doi:10.1007/978-1-349-01278-7. ISBN 978-1-349-01280-0.
- Hare, R. M. (1981). Moral Thinking: its levels, method, and point. Oxford New York: Clarendon Press Oxford University Press. ISBN 9780198246602.
- Hare, R. M. (1983). Plato. Oxford New York: Clarendon Press Oxford University Press. ISBN 9780192875853.
- Hare, R. M. (1989). Essays in Ethical Theory. Oxford England New York: Clarendon Press Oxford University Press. ISBN 9780198244394.
- Hare, R. M. (1989). Essays on Political Morality. Oxford New York: Clarendon Press Oxford University Press. ISBN 9780198249955.
- Hare, R. M. (1992). Essays on Religion and Education. Oxford, New York: Clarendon Press Oxford University Press. ISBN 9780198249962.
- Hare, R. M. (1997). Sorting Out Ethics. Oxford, New York: Clarendon Press, Oxford University Press. ISBN 978-0-19-823727-3.
- Hare, R. M. (1993). Essays on Bioethics. Clarendon Press. ISBN 9780198236788.
- Hare, R. M. (1999). Objective prescriptions, and other essays. Oxford : Oxford; New York: Clarendon Press; Oxford University Press. doi:10.1093/oso/9780198238539.001.0001. ISBN 978-0-19-823853-9.

For a more complete list of publications see the annotated bibliography by Keith Burgess-Jackson.

== See also ==
- Faculty of Philosophy, University of Oxford
- Tanner Lectures on Human Values

== Notes ==
Academic offices
Preceded by William Kneale	White's Professor of Moral Philosophy; 1966–1983	Vacant Title next held by Bernard Williams
Preceded by Hilary Putnam	Hägerström Lecturer; 1991	Succeeded by D. H. Mellor
Professional and academic associations
Preceded by Martha Kneale	President of the Aristotelian Society; 1972–1973	Succeeded by Charles H. Whiteley
