= Lesis =

Ancient Greek slave

Lesis was an Ancient Greek slave from Classical Athens.

In 1972, during an excavation in the Ancient Agora of Athens, near Stoa Basileios, a lead tablet from the 4th century BC was discovered. The tablet was a letter by Lesis, who wrote:

Lesis is sending (a letter) to Xenokles and to his mother by no means to overlook that he is perishing in the foundry but to come to his masters and find something better than him. For I have been handed over to a man thoroughly wicked; I am perishing from being whipped; I am tied up; I am treated like dirt—more and more!

The letter was written for Xenokles, his master, and his mother. He is one of few recorded literate slaves in Ancient Greece, and the only evidence of Ancient Greek slaves being beaten. Scholar David R. Jordan placed doubts that Lesis was actually a slave, arguing that he was an apprentice, and his mother put him under supervision of the foundry owner to teach metalworking.
