= Euthyphro (prophet) =

Classical Athenian prophet depicted by Plato

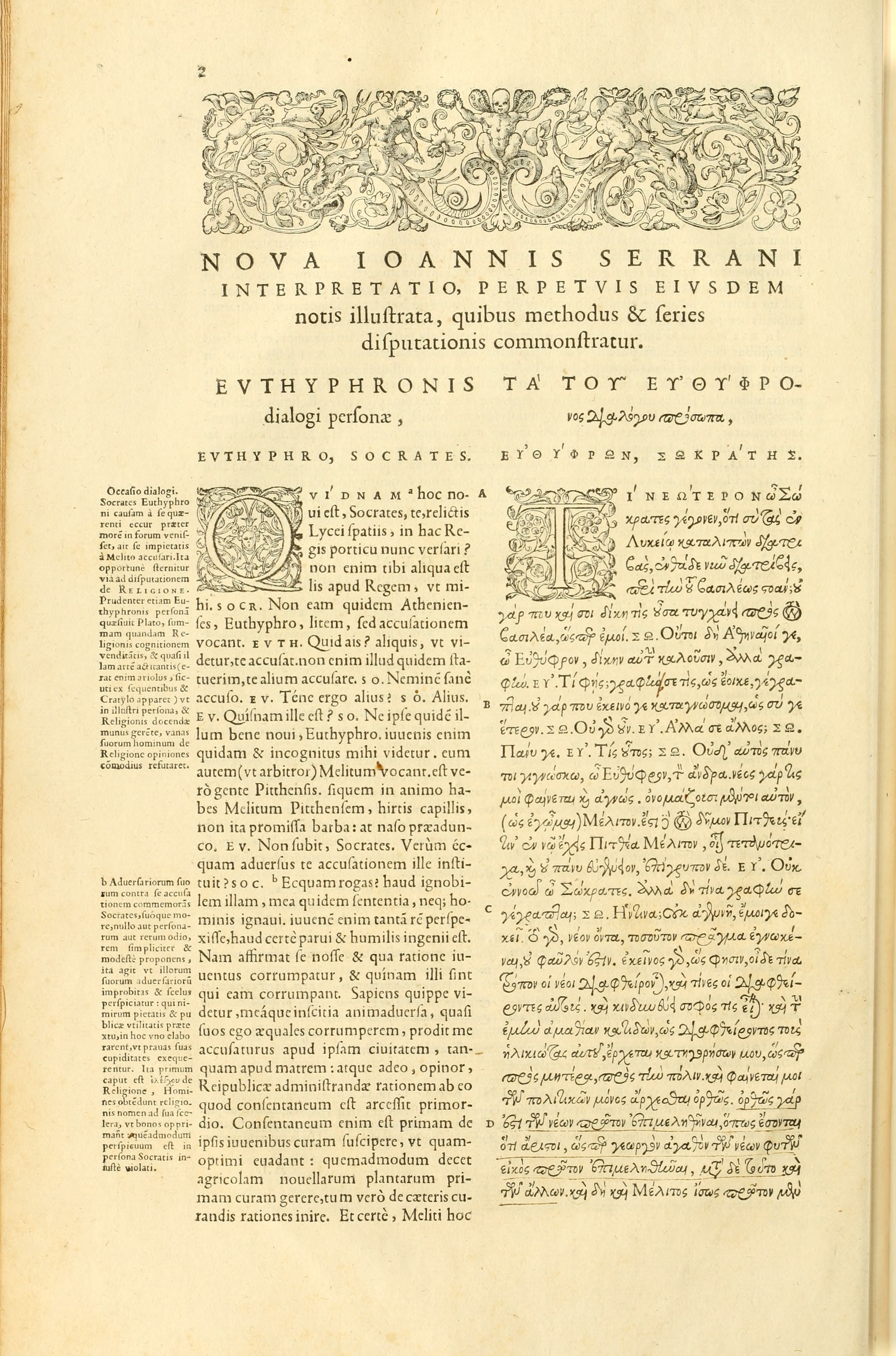
The Stephanus edition of Plato's Euthyphro, the dialogue for which the ancient prophet is best remembered.

Euthyphro of Prospalta (/ˈjuːθɪfroʊ/; Ancient Greek: Εὐθύφρων Προσπάλτιος; fl. 400 BCE) was an ancient Athenian religious prophet (mantis) best known for his role in his eponymous dialogue written by the philosopher Plato. Euthyphro's biography can be reconstructed only through the details revealed by Plato in the Euthyphro and Cratylus, as no further contemporaneous sources exist.

Euthyphro's status as a "mantic" seer, and his particular interest in father-gods such as Uranus, Cronus and Zeus, is supported by both texts, and Socrates accredits Euthyphro with igniting deep inspiration during the etymological exercise he embarks upon in the Cratylus. Although Socrates seems to treat this faculty with ironic disdain, he never criticizes it openly, however it is implied that the other Athenian citizens at the Ecclesia often responded to Euthyphro's claims of divination with disdain and scorn. It is entirely possible as well that Euthyphro was created by Plato as a literary device. His name in ancient Greek is a combination of εὐθύς, euthys, which means straight or direct, and φρονέω, phroneô, which means to think or to reason; hence his name means "straight thinker" or "Mr. Right-mind".

The Euthyphro depicts him as an Athenian citizen of the deme Prospalta, who was old enough to have appeared multiple times before the Athenian assembly. Euthyphro seems to have brought charges against his own father for leaving a paid laborer to die in a ditch after the laborer had killed another worker during a fight, though it is likely that Euthyphro did not expect serious punishment to be implemented for this crime. Euthyphro had evidently farmed on Naxos, probably as part of the cleruchy established by Pericles in 447 to which his father may have belonged. If he was, in fact, historical, the trial he instigated against his father depicted in the Euthyphro may have begun as early as 404, and the dramatic date of the Euthyphro may be definitively set at 399 BCE, placing his birth somewhere in the mid-5th century BCE.

The dramatic date of the Cratylus is uncertain, argued to be before 421 BCE, circa 410 BCE, or 399 BCE; this makes gauging the exact Euthyphro's period of activity difficult. If the Cratylus is indeed set two decades prior, he would have been in his mid-forties in the Euthyphro, meaning his father was in his seventies and hence a contemporary of Socrates. This earlier dating paradigm furthermore suggests that he may have been a long-lived figure in Athens.

While little remains of Euthyphro's life, his depiction in Plato sparked interest in many generations of scholars and commentators. Diogenes Laërtius depicts him as being swayed away from the prosecution of his father following the aporia demonstrated in his eponymous dialogue. Inspired by this aporia, the debate between Euthyphro and Socrates therein influenced generations of theologians and gave rise to the question of the relationship between God and morality known as the Euthyphro dilemma. This arose in antiquity and was revived by Ralph Cudworth and Samuel Clarke in the 17th and 18th centuries, remaining relevant in theological and philosophical discussions for centuries thereafter.

== See also ==
- List of speakers in Plato's dialogues
