= Universalizability =

Concept in Kantian ethics

The concept of universalizability was set out by the 18th-century German philosopher Immanuel Kant as part of his work Groundwork of the Metaphysics of Morals. It is part of the first formulation of his categorical imperative, which states that the only morally acceptable maxims of our actions are those that could rationally be willed to be universal law.

The precise meaning of universalizability is contentious, but the most common interpretation is that the categorical imperative asks whether the maxim of your action could become one that everyone could act upon in similar circumstances. An action is socially acceptable if it can be universalized (i.e., everyone could do it).

For instance, one can determine whether a maxim of lying to secure a loan is moral by attempting to universalize it and applying reason to the results. If everyone lied to secure loans, the very practices of promising and lending would fall apart, and the maxim would then become impossible.

Kant calls such acts examples of a contradiction in conception, which is much like a performative contradiction, because they undermine the very basis for their existence.

Kant's notion of universalizability has a clear antecedent in Rousseau's idea of a general will. Both notions provide for a radical separation of will and nature, leading to the idea that true freedom lies substantially in self-legislation.

== See also ==
- Categorical imperative
- Deontology
