= Stoa =

Covered walkway in ancient Greece

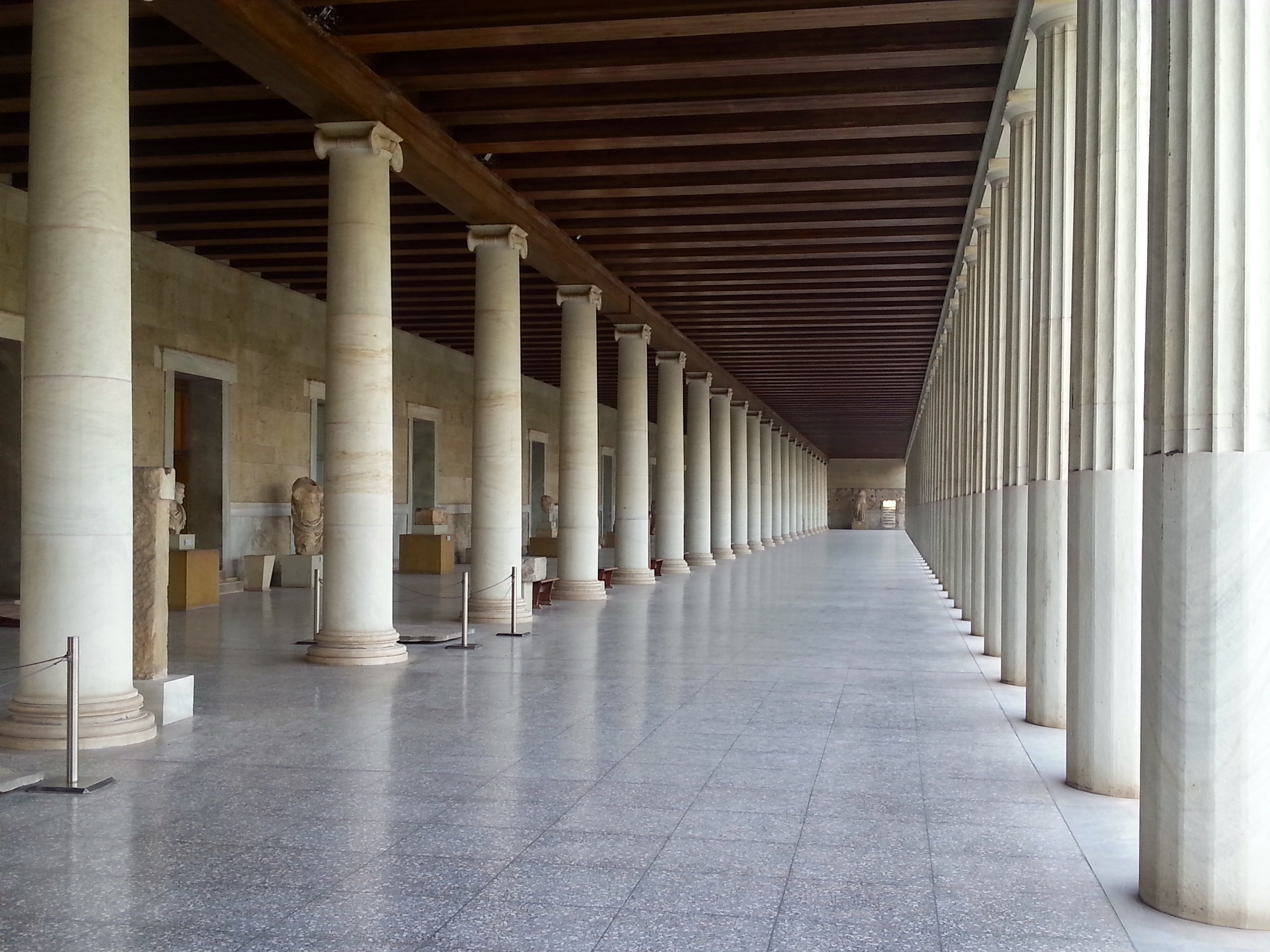
The restored Stoa of Attalos in Athens, with busts of historical philosophers.

A stoa (/ˈstoʊə/; plural, stoas, stoai, or stoae /ˈstoʊ.iː/), in ancient Greek architecture, is a covered walkway or portico, commonly for public use. Early stoas were open at the entrance with columns, usually of the Doric order, lining the side of a building; they created a safe, enveloping, protective atmosphere.

This, an "open-fronted shelter with a lean-to roof", is the meaning in modern usage, but in fact the ancient Greeks "made no clear distinction in their speech" between these and large enclosed rooms with similar functions.

Later examples were built as two storeys, and incorporated inner colonnades usually in the Ionic style, where shops or sometimes offices were located. These buildings were open to the public; merchants could sell their goods, artists could display their artwork, and religious gatherings could take place. Stoas usually surrounded the marketplaces or agora of large cities and were used as a framing device.

Other examples were designed to create safe, protective atmospheres which combined useful inside and outside space. The name of the Stoic school of philosophy derives from "stoa".

== Famous stoas ==
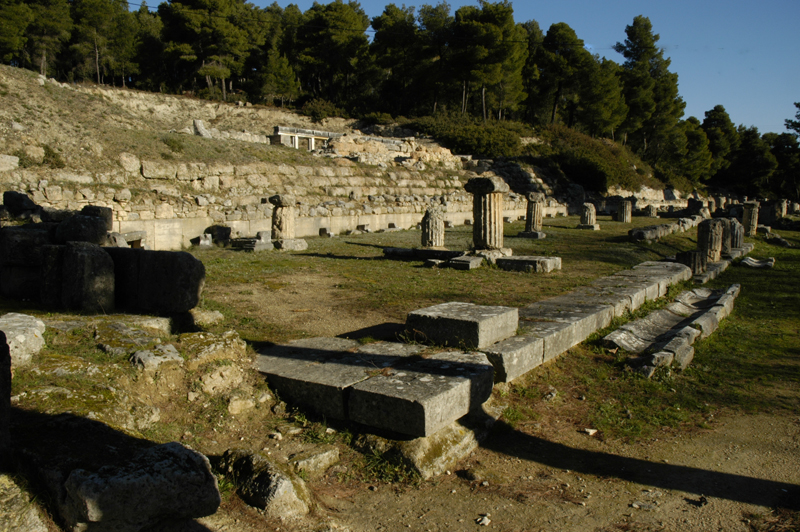
View of the Stoa Amphiaraion

- Stoa Poikile, "Painted Porch", from which the philosophy Stoicism takes its name
- Stoa of Attalos
- Stoa Basileios (Royal Stoa)
- Stoa of Zeus at Athens
- Stoa Amphiaraion
- Stoa of the Athenians
- Royal Stoa of Herod's Temple

== See also ==
- Arcade (architecture)
